= Georgia's 80th House of Representatives district =

American legislative district

Georgia's 80th State House of Representatives district
Representative
Long Tran; D–Dunwoody

Georgia's 80th District House elects one member of the Georgia House of Representatives. Its current representative is Democrat Long Tran.

== Elected representatives ==
Representative	Party	Term start	Term end	Hometown	Notes
William Crowe	Democrat	1966	1969		
Henry Roswell Smith	Democrat	1971	1973		Post 1
John H. Sherman	Democrat	1969	1973		Post 2
Jack Connell	Democrat	1973	1975		
Phillip Ham	Democrat	1975	1983	Forsyth	
Kenneth Waldrep	Democrat	1983	1989		
Curtis Jenkins	Democrat	1989	1993		
Brooks Coleman	Republican	1993	2003		
Ben Harbin	Republican	2003	2005		
Mike Jacobs	Democrat	2005	2007		
Mike Jacobs	Republican	2007	2015		
Taylor Bennett	Democrat	2015	2017	Brookhaven	
Meagan Hanson	Republican	2017	2019	Brookhaven	
Matthew Wilson	Democrat	2019	2022	Brookhaven	
Long Tran	Democrat	2022	Present	Dunwoody	
