= 2022 Georgia lieutenant gubernatorial election =

- November 8, 2022
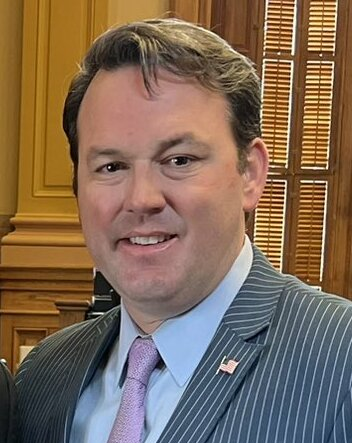

Nominee	Burt Jones	Charlie Bailey
Party	Republican	Democratic
Popular vote	2,009,617	1,815,524
Percentage	51.39%	46.43%
- Jones: 40–50% 50–60% 60–70% 70–80% 80–90% >90% Bailey: 40–50% 50–60% 60–70% 70–80% 80–90% >90% No data
Lieutenant Governor before election
Geoff Duncan
Republican
Elected Lieutenant Governor
Burt Jones
Republican

The 2022 Georgia lieutenant gubernatorial election was held on November 8, 2022, to elect the lieutenant governor of the U.S. state of Georgia. It coincided with various other statewide elections, including for U.S. Senate, U.S. House, and Governor of Georgia. Georgia is one of 21 states that elects its lieutenant governor separately from its governor.

Incumbent Republican Lieutenant Governor Geoff Duncan, who was first elected in 2018 with 51.6% of the vote, declined to run for a second term after he openly contradicted claims of election fraud in the 2020 presidential election. A vocal critic of Donald Trump, he had been speculated as a potential presidential candidate in the 2024 election.

Primary elections were held on May 24, with runoffs being held on June 21 for instances in which no candidate received a majority of the initial vote. State legislator Burt Jones won the Republican nomination and was one of two Trump-endorsed statewide candidates in Georgia to do so, along with Herschel Walker in his run for U.S. Senate. Attorney Charlie Bailey won the Democratic primary in a runoff, and former party chair Ryan Graham was chosen as the Libertarian nominee.

Jones was declared the winner on November 9 after all the votes were counted. He was inaugurated on January 9, 2023.

== Republican primary ==
=== Candidates ===
==== Nominee ====
- Burt Jones, state senator

==== Eliminated in primary ====
- Mack McGregor, manufacturing supervisor
- Butch Miller, president pro tempore of the Georgia State Senate
- Jeanne Seaver, activist and candidate for Georgia's 12th congressional district in 2010

==== Declined ====
- Chris Clark, president and CEO of the Georgia Chamber of Commerce
- Geoff Duncan, incumbent lieutenant governor
- P. K. Martin IV, former state senator

=== Endorsements ===
Burt Jones

Executive Branch officials

- Donald Trump, 45th President of the United States (2017–2021)

=== Polling ===
Graphical summary

Poll source	Date(s) administered	Sample size (Note: Key: A – all adults RV – registered voters LV – likely voters V – unclear)	Margin of error	Burt Jones	Mack McGregor	Butch Miller	Jeanne Seaver	Other	Undecided
Landmark Communications	May 22, 2022	500 (LV)	± 4.4%	44%	5%	23%	6%	–	22%
ARW Strategies (R)	April 30 – May 1, 2022	600 (LV)	± 4.0%	31%	3%	15%	4%	–	47%
SurveyUSA	April 22–27, 2022	559 (LV)	± 4.8%	14%	8%	15%	4%	–	59%
University of Georgia	April 10–22, 2022	886 (LV)	± 3.3%	27%	6%	14%	2%	–	52%
Guidant Polling & Strategy (R) (Note: Poll sponsored by the Georgia Leadership Coalition)	April 18–21, 2022	600 (LV)	± 4.0%	20%	3%	13%	2%	–	62%
Landmark Communications	April 9–10, 2022	660 (LV)	± 3.8%	29%	4%	12%	2%	–	54%
University of Georgia	March 20 – April 8, 2022	~329 (LV)	± 5.4%	30%	4%	11%	1%	–	54%
InsiderAdvantage (R)	February 28 – March 1, 2022	750 (LV)	± 3.6%	32%	–	14%	–	4%	51%

=== Results ===
Primary results by county: Jones: 30–40%; 40–50%; 50–60%; 60–70%; 70–80%; 80–90%; Miller: 30–40%; 40–50%; 60–70%

Primary results by precinct: Jones: 30–40%; 40–50%; 50–60%; 60–70%; 70–80%; 80–90%; >90%; Miller: <30%; 30–40%; 40–50%; 50–60%; 60–70%; 70–80%; 80–90%; >90%; McGregor: 30–40%; 40–50%; 50–60%; 60–70%; 70–80%; >90%; Seaver: 30–40%; 40–50%; 50–60%; 60–70%; >90%; Tie: 20–30%; 30–40%; 40–50%; 50%; No votes

Republican primary results
Party	Candidate	Votes	%
Republican	Burt Jones	558,979	50.06%
Republican	Butch Miller	347,547	31.12%
Republican	Mack McGregor	125,916	11.28%
Republican	Jeanne Seaver	84,225	7.54%
Total votes		1,116,667	100.0%

== Democratic primary ==
=== Candidates ===
==== Nominee ====
- Charlie Bailey, former Fulton County senior assistant district attorney and nominee for Georgia Attorney General in 2018

==== Eliminated in runoff ====
- Kwanza Hall, former U.S. Representative for Georgia's 5th congressional district and former Atlanta city councilor

==== Eliminated in initial primary ====
- Erick Allen, state representative
- Tyrone Brooks Jr., manager
- Tony Brown, U.S. Air Force veteran
- Jason Hayes, doctor
- Derrick Jackson, state representative
- Rashid Malik, entrepreneur
- Renitta Shannon, state representative

==== Did not file ====
- Ben Turner, entrepreneur, educator, and activist

==== Withdrawn ====
- Bryan Miller, grandson of former U.S. Senator Zell Miller

==== Declined ====
- Keisha Lance Bottoms, former Mayor of Atlanta
- Carolyn Bourdeaux, U.S. Representative from Georgia's 7th congressional district (ran for re-election)
- Sarah Riggs Amico, businesswoman, nominee for lieutenant governor in 2018, and candidate for U.S. Senate in 2020 (endorsed Allen)

=== Endorsements ===
Erick Allen

Individuals

- Sarah Riggs Amico, businesswoman, nominee for lieutenant governor in 2018, and candidate for U.S. Senate in 2020
Charlie Bailey

U.S. Representatives

- Hank Johnson, U.S. Representative from Georgia's 4th congressional district
- Lucy McBath, U.S. Representative from Georgia's 6th congressional district

Statewide officials

- Roy Barnes, former Governor of Georgia
- DuBose Porter, former chair of the Democratic Party of Georgia
- Mark Taylor, former Lieutenant Governor of Georgia

State legislators

- Stacey Abrams, former Minority Leader of the Georgia House of Representatives, founder of Fair Fight Action, and nominee for Governor of Georgia in 2018 and 2022
- Al Williams, state representative

=== First round ===
==== Polling ====
Poll source	Date(s) administered	Sample size	Margin of error	Erick Allen	Charlie Bailey	Tyrone Brooks Jr.	Tony Brown	Kwanza Hall	Jason Hayes	Derrick Jackson	Rashid Malik	Renitta Shannon	Undecided
SurveyUSA	April 22–27, 2022	549 (LV)	± 5.0%	2%	3%	4%	3%	11%	3%	5%	2%	4%	62%

==== Results ====
Primary results by county: Hall: <30%; 30–40%; 40–50%; Bailey: <30%; 30–40%; 40–50%; Shannon: <30%; Brooks: <30%; 30–40%; 50–60%; Allen: <30%; Jackson: <30%; 30–40%; Brown: <30%; Hayes: <30%; Tie: 20–30%

Primary results by precinct: Hall: <30%; 30–40%; 40–50%; 50–60%; 60–70%; 70–80%; >90%; Bailey: <30%; 30–40%; 40–50%; 50–60%; 60–70%; >90%; Shannon: <30%; 30–40%; 40–50%; 50–60%; >90%; Brooks: <30%; 30–40%; 40–50%; 50–60%; 70–80%; Allen: <30%; 30–40%; 40–50%; 50–60%; 60–70%; Jackson: <30%; 30–40%; 40–50%; 50–60%; 60–70%; >90%; Brown: <30%; 40–50%; >90%; Hayes: <30%; 30–40%; 50–60%; >90%; Tie: 20–30%; 30–40%; 40–50%; 50%; No votes

Democratic primary results
Party	Candidate	Votes	%
Democratic	Kwanza Hall	208,249	30.16%
Democratic	Charlie Bailey	121,750	17.63%
Democratic	Renitta Shannon	99,877	14.46%
Democratic	Tyrone Brooks Jr.	74,855	10.84%
Democratic	Erick Allen	63,222	9.15%
Democratic	Derrick Jackson	60,706	8.79%
Democratic	Tony Brown	27,905	4.04%
Democratic	Jason Hayes	21,415	3.10%
Democratic	Rashid Malik	12,610	1.83%
Total votes		690,589	100.0%

=== Runoff ===
==== Results ====
Runoff results by county: Bailey: 50–60%; 60–70%; 70–80%; 80–90%; Hall: 50–60%; 60–70%; 70–80%; Tie: 50%

Runoff results by precinct: Bailey: 50–60%; 60–70%; 70–80%; 80–90%; >90%; Hall: 50–60%; 60–70%; 70–80%; 80–90%; >90%; Tie: 50%; No votes

Democratic primary runoff results
Party	Candidate	Votes	%
Democratic	Charlie Bailey	162,771	63.05%
Democratic	Kwanza Hall	95,375	36.95%
Total votes		258,146	100.0%

== Libertarian primary ==
=== Candidates ===
==== Nominee ====
- Ryan Graham, chair of the Libertarian Party of Georgia and candidate for Georgia Public Service Commission in 2018

== General election ==
=== Post-primary endorsements ===
Burt Jones (R)

U.S. Representatives

- Kwanza Hall, former U.S. Representative from Georgia's 5th congressional district (Democratic)

Organizations

- Georgia Chamber of Commerce
Charlie Bailey (D)

Organizations

- Georgia Equality
- NARAL Pro-Choice America
Declined to endorse

Statewide officials

- Geoff Duncan, Lieutenant Governor of Georgia (Republican)

=== Polling ===
Graphical summary

Poll source	Date(s) administered	Sample size	Margin of error	Burt Jones (R)	Charlie Bailey (D)	Ryan Graham (L)	Other	Undecided
Landmark Communications	November 4–7, 2022	1,214 (LV)	± 2.8%	50%	41%	4%	–	6%
InsiderAdvantage (R)	November 6, 2022	550 (LV)	± 4.2%	50%	43%	2%	3%	2%
The Trafalgar Group (R)	November 4–6, 2022	1,103 (LV)	± 2.9%	51%	41%	4%	–	4%
InsiderAdvantage (R)	October 16, 2022	550 (LV)	± 4.2%	46%	41%	4%	–	10%
Research Affiliates (D) (Note: Poll sponsored by Bailey's campaign)	July 26 – August 1, 2022	420 (LV)	± 4.8%	43%	43%	–	–	14%
InsiderAdvantage (R)	July 26–27, 2022	750 (LV)	± 3.6%	43%	37%	4%	–	16%
University of Georgia	July 14–22, 2022	902 (LV)	± 3.3%	41%	36%	7%	–	16%

=== Results ===
2022 Georgia lieutenant gubernatorial election
Party	Candidate	Votes	%	±%
Republican	Burt Jones	2,009,617	51.39%	–0.21%
Democratic	Charlie Bailey	1,815,524	46.43%	–1.97%
Libertarian	Ryan Graham	85,207	2.18%	N/A
Total votes		3,910,348	100.0%	
Republican hold				

==== By congressional district ====
Jones won nine of 14 congressional districts.

District	Jones	Bailey	Representative
1st	58%	39%	Buddy Carter
2nd	47%	51%	Sanford Bishop
3rd	66%	32%	Drew Ferguson
4th	21%	77%	Hank Johnson
5th	17%	81%	Nikema Williams
6th	60%	37%	Lucy McBath (117th Congress)
6th	60%	37%	Rich McCormick (118th Congress)
7th	38%	59%	Carolyn Bourdeaux (117th Congress)
7th	38%	59%	Lucy McBath (118th Congress)
8th	67%	32%	Austin Scott
9th	71%	27%	Andrew Clyde
10th	63%	35%	Jody Hice (117th Congress)
10th	63%	35%	Mike Collins (118th Congress)
11th	59%	38%	Barry Loudermilk
12th	58%	40%	Rick Allen
13th	18%	80%	David Scott
14th	69%	29%	Marjorie Taylor Greene

== See also ==
- 2022 Georgia state elections

== Notes ==
Partisan sponsors
