= 2022 Georgia state elections =

2022 Georgia elections
- November 8, 2022; December 6, 2022

Several elections took place in the U.S. state of Georgia in 2022. The general election was held on November 8, 2022. A runoff election for one of Georgia's seats in the United States Senate was held on December 6, 2022. The runoff was scheduled because none of the candidates for Senate received 50% of the statewide vote in the general election. In addition to the Senate seat, all of Georgia's seats in the United States House of Representatives were up for election. Also up for election were all of Georgia's executive officers and legislative seats, as well as one seat on the Georgia Public Service Commission. The Republican Party decisively won every single statewide office in Georgia except for the Federal Senate race which narrowly went Democratic in 2022.The primary election were held on May 24 and primary runoff on June 21

This was the first election following the 2020 United States redistricting cycle.

== Federal offices ==
=== United States House of Representatives ===
Following the 2020 election, Democrats held their largest share of Georgia congressional seats since 2008 (and largest in the post-2010 redistricting cycle), with the gain of the 7th district by Carolyn Bourdeaux. In addition, the number of women representing Georgia grew from one to four with the re-election of Democrat Lucy McBath and the elections of Democrats Bordeaux, Nikema Williams and Republican Marjorie Taylor Greene, resulting in the first Georgia delegation with more than one woman in membership.

=== United States Senate ===
Incumbent Democrat Raphael Warnock won the 2020–2021 special election against incumbent Republican Kelly Loeffler to fill the remainder of former Sen. Johnny Isakson's term. (Isakson had resigned at the end of 2019, and Loeffler was appointed by Governor Brian Kemp following Isakson's resignation.) No candidate in the open election on November 3 received the 50% required by Georgia law to avoid a runoff, a type of election colloquially known as a "jungle primary"—Warnock received just 32.9% of the vote—and so a runoff election between Warnock and Loeffler was held on January 5, 2021, which Warnock won with 51% of the vote.

Former Republican senator David Perdue, who lost his race to Democratic challenger Jon Ossoff in 2021, filed paperwork to run for this seat. A week after filing the paperwork, however, Perdue announced that he would not pursue another race for the Senate. Loeffler considered running again, while former U.S. Representative Doug Collins declined to run after heavy speculation that he would enter the race. Herschel Walker, a professional football player, announced in August 2021 that he would join the Republican primary.

== Governor ==
Governor Brian Kemp was elected in 2018 with 50.2% of the vote. He ran for re-election, facing primary challenges from former U.S. Senator David Perdue and several other candidates.

Stacey Abrams, former minority leader of the Georgia House of Representatives and Democratic nominee for governor in 2018, ran unchallenged for the Democratic nomination.

Kemp easily won reelection, receiving 53.4% to Abrams’ 45.9% (7.5%).

== Lieutenant governor ==
Incumbent Republican Lieutenant Governor Geoff Duncan, who was first elected in 2018, declined to run for a second term after he openly contradicted claims of election fraud in the 2020 presidential election.

State legislator Burt Jones won the Republican nomination and was one of two Trump-endorsed statewide candidates in Georgia to do so, along with Herschel Walker in his run for U.S. Senate. Attorney Charlie Bailey won the Democratic primary in a runoff.

Jones was declared the winner on November 9 after all the votes were counted.

== Secretary of state ==
Incumbent secretary of state Brad Raffensperger ran for re-election, facing primary challenges from Republican Congressman Jody Hice and former Alpharetta mayor David Belle Isle.

State Representative Bee Nguyen, former Cobb County Democratic Party Chairman, Dr. Michael Owens, former Darton State College professor Manswell Peterson (withdrawn), former Fulton County Commission Chair John Eaves, and former Georgia State Senator and Mayor of Milledgeville Floyd L. Griffin Jr. all declared their candidacies for the Democratic nomination.

== Attorney general ==
Republican incumbent attorney general Chris Carr ran for re-election.

State Senator Jen Jordan ran for the Democratic nomination. Charlie Bailey, former Fulton County senior assistant district attorney and 2018 Democratic nominee for attorney general, withdrew as a candidate in this race to run for lieutenant governor.

== Labor commissioner ==
2022 Georgia Labor Commissioner election
- November 8, 2022

Nominee	Bruce Thompson	William Boddie
Party	Republican	Democratic
Popular vote	2,030,170	1,766,894
Percentage	52.1%	45.3%
- Thompson: 40–50% 50–60% 60–70% 70–80% 80–90% >90% Bodie: 40–50% 50–60% 60–70% 70–80% 80–90% >90%
Commissioner before election
Mark Butler
Republican
Elected Commissioner
Bruce Thompson
Republican

Incumbent Republican Mark Butler was eligible to seek a fourth term in office, but chose to retire.

=== Republican primary ===
==== Nominee ====
- Bruce Thompson, state senator

==== Eliminated in primary ====
- Kartik Bhatt, consumer-member of the Georgia Board of Examiners for the Certification of Water and Wastewater Treatment Plant Operators and Laboratory Analysts
- Mike Coan, former state representative

==== Declined ====
- Mark Butler, incumbent labor commissioner

==== Polling ====
Poll source	Date(s) administered	Sample size (Note: Key: A – all adults RV – registered voters LV – likely voters V – unclear)	Margin of error	Kartik Bhatt	Mike Coan	Bruce Thompson	Undecided
Landmark Communications (R)	May 22, 2022	500 (LV)	± 4.4%	4%	18%	38%	41%
ARW Strategies (R)	April 30 – May 1, 2022	600 (LV)	± 4.0%	4%	6%	11%	79%
Landmark Communications (R)	April 9–10, 2022	660 (LV)	± 3.8%	4%	6%	13%	77%

==== Primary results ====
Republican primary results
Party	Candidate	Votes	%
Republican	Bruce Thompson	637,857	62.65%
Republican	Mike Coan	312,842	30.73%
Republican	Kartik Bhatt	67,407	6.62%
Total votes		1,018,106	100.0%

=== Democratic primary ===
==== Nominee ====
- William Boddie, state representative

==== Eliminated in runoff ====
- Nicole Horn, entrepreneur

==== Eliminated in initial primary ====
- Thomas Dean, courier
- Lester Jackson, state senator
- Nadia Surrency, entrepreneur and philanthropist

Democratic primary results
Party	Candidate	Votes	%
Democratic	William Boddie	184,446	27.67%
Democratic	Nicole Horn	167,442	25.12%
Democratic	Lester Jackson	129,109	19.37%
Democratic	Nadia Surrency	119,582	17.94%
Democratic	Thomas Dean	66,107	9.92%
Total votes		666,686	100.0%

Democratic runoff results
Party	Candidate	Votes	%
Democratic	William Boddie	157,153	62.26%
Democratic	Nicole Horn	95,262	37.74%
Total votes		252,415	100.0%

=== Libertarian primary ===
==== Nominee ====
- Emily Anderson, printer

=== General election ===
==== Results ====
2022 Georgia Labor Commissioner election
Party	Candidate	Votes	%	±%
Republican	Bruce Thompson	2,030,170	52.08%	−0.38%
Democratic	William Boddie	1,766,894	45.33%	−2.21%
Libertarian	Emily Anderson	100,960	2.59%	N/A
Total votes		3,898,024	100.0%	
Republican hold				

== State Superintendent of Schools ==
2022 Georgia State Superintendent of Schools election
- November 8, 2022
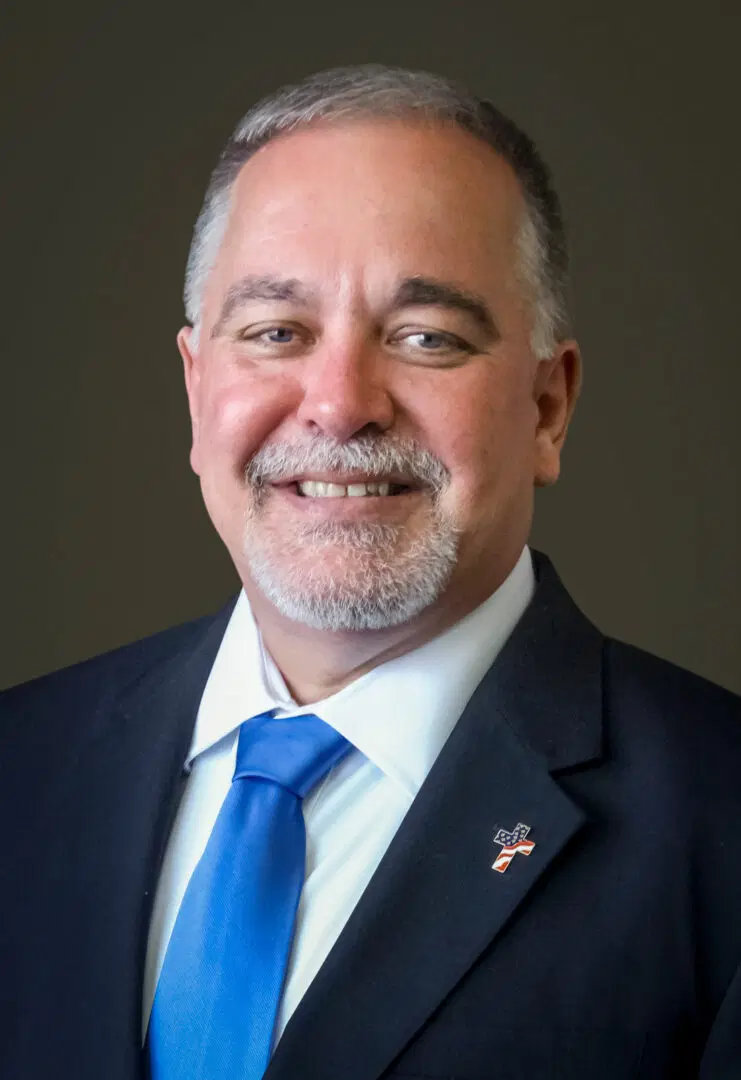

Nominee	Richard Woods	Alisha Thomas Searcy
Party	Republican	Democratic
Popular vote	2,115,728	1,788,671
Percentage	54.2%	45.8%
- Woods: 50–60% 60–70% 70–80% 80–90% >90% Thomas Searcy: 50–60% 60–70% 70–80% 80–90% >90%
Superintendent before election
Richard Woods
Republican
Elected Superintendent
Richard Woods
Republican

Incumbent Republican superintendent Richard Woods sought a third term in office.

=== Republican primary ===
==== Candidates ====
===== Nominee =====
- Richard Woods, incumbent superintendent

===== Eliminated in primary =====
- John Barge, former superintendent, candidate for Governor of Georgia in 2014, candidate for superintendent in 2018, and candidate for U.S. House in 2020

==== Polling ====
Poll source	Date(s) administered	Sample size	Margin of error	John Barge	Richard Woods	Undecided
Landmark Communications (R)	April 9–10, 2022	660 (LV)	± 3.8%	17%	30%	53%

==== Primary results ====
Republican primary results
Party	Candidate	Votes	%
Republican	Richard Woods (incumbent)	802,260	72.61%
Republican	John Barge	302,681	27.39%
Total votes		1,104,941	100.0%

=== Democratic primary ===
==== Candidates ====
===== Nominee =====
- Alisha Thomas Searcy, former state representative (2003–2015) and candidate for State School Superintendent in 2014

===== Eliminated in primary =====
- Currey Hitchens, lawyer
- Jaha Howard, Cobb County school board member
- James Morrow Jr., teacher

===== Withdrew =====
- Everton Blair, member and former chair of the Gwinnett County school board

==== Endorsements ====
Everton Blair (withdrawn)

Federal politicians

- Lucy McBath, U.S. representative for Georgia's 6th congressional district

State legislators

- Billy Mitchell, state representative

==== Primary results ====
Democratic primary results
Party	Candidate	Votes	%
Democratic	Alisha Thomas Searcy	382,792	56.98%
Democratic	Jaha Howard	100,675	14.99%
Democratic	James Morrow, Jr.	97,821	14.56%
Democratic	Currey Hitchens	90,514	13.47%
Total votes		671,802	100.0%

=== Libertarian primary ===
==== Candidates ====
===== Did not file =====
- Ken Pullin, former Republican state representative

=== General election ===
==== Debate ====
2022 Georgia State School Superintendent debate
No.	Date	Host	Moderator	Link	Republican	Democratic
Key: P Participant A Absent N Not invited I Invited W Withdrawn						
Key: P Participant A Absent N Not invited I Invited W Withdrawn					Richard Woods	Alisha Thomas Searcy
1	Oct. 17, 2022	Atlanta Press Club	Jeff Hullinger	YouTube	P	P

==== Results ====
2022 Georgia State School Superintendent election
Party	Candidate	Votes	%	±%
Republican	Richard Woods (incumbent)	2,115,728	54.19%	+1.17%
Democratic	Alisha Thomas Searcy	1,788,671	45.81%	−1.17%
Total votes		3,904,399	100.0%	
Republican hold				

== Insurance and Safety Fire Commissioner ==
2022 Georgia Insurance and Safety Fire Commissioner election
- November 8, 2022
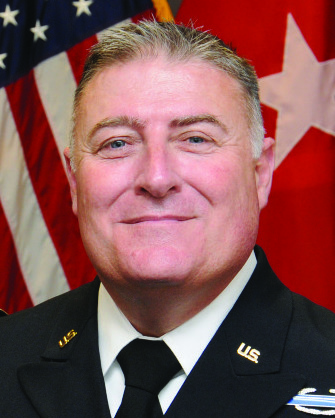

Nominee	John King	Janice Laws Robinson
Party	Republican	Democratic
Popular vote	2,107,388	1,788,136
Percentage	54.1%	45.9%
- King: 50–60% 60–70% 70–80% 80–90% >90% Laws Robinson: 50–60% 60–70% 70–80% 80–90% >90%
Commissioner before election
John King
Republican
Elected Commissioner
John King
Republican

Incumbent Republican commissioner John King, who was appointed to the position in 2019 after the resignation of Jim Beck, ran for a full term.

=== Republican primary ===
==== Nominee ====
- John King, incumbent commissioner

==== Eliminated in primary ====
- Ben Cowart, property developer
- Patrick Witt, former Trump administration official (previously ran for U.S. House)

==== Endorsements ====
Patrick Witt

Executive branch officials

- Donald Trump, 45th president of the United States (2017–2021)

==== Polling ====
Poll source	Date(s) administered	Sample size	Margin of error	Ben Cowart	John King	Patrick Witt	Undecided
Landmark Communications (R)	April 9–10, 2022	660 (LV)	± 3.8%	5%	25%	6%	64%
University of Georgia	March 20 – April 8, 2022	~329 (LV)	± 5.4%	10%	11%	8%	71%
Clout Research (R) (Note: Poll conducted for King's campaign)	March 5–7, 2022	599 (LV)	± 4.0%	–	31%	5%	64%

==== Primary results ====
Republican primary results
Party	Candidate	Votes	%
Republican	John King (incumbent)	780,649	70.58%
Republican	Patrick Witt	185,257	16.75%
Republican	Ben Cowart	140,150	12.67%
Total votes		1,106,056	100.0%

=== Democratic primary ===
==== Nominee ====
- Janice Laws Robinson, insurance broker

==== Eliminated in runoff ====
- Raphael Baker, insurance broker

==== Eliminated in initial primary ====
- Matthew Wilson, state representative

==== Endorsements ====
Matthew Wilson

State officials

- Roy Barnes, former governor of Georgia
- Sherry Boston, DeKalb County District Attorney

State legislators

- Shelly Hutchinson, state representative
- Dewey McClain, state representative
- Bee Nguyen, state representative
- Sam Park, state representative

==== Primary results ====
Democratic primary results
Party	Candidate	Votes	%
Democratic	Janice Laws Robinson	326,524	48.70%
Democratic	Raphael Baker	221,783	33.08%
Democratic	Matthew Wilson	122,192	18.22%
Total votes		670,499	100.0%

==== Runoff results ====
Democratic runoff results
Party	Candidate	Votes	%
Democratic	Janice Laws Robinson	158,734	63.74%
Democratic	Raphael Baker	90,317	36.26%
Total votes		249,051	100.0%

=== General election ===
==== Debate ====
2022 Georgia Insurance and Safety Fire Commissioner debate
No.	Date	Host	Moderator	Link	Republican	Democratic
Key: P Participant A Absent N Not invited I Invited W Withdrawn						
Key: P Participant A Absent N Not invited I Invited W Withdrawn					John King	Janice Laws Robinson
1	Oct. 17, 2022	Atlanta Press Club	Jeff Hullinger	YouTube	P	P

==== Results ====
2022 Georgia Insurance and Safety Fire Commissioner election
Party	Candidate	Votes	%	±%
Republican	John King (incumbent)	2,107,388	54.10%	+3.73%
Democratic	Janice Laws Robinson	1,788,136	45.90%	−1.09%
Total votes		3,895,524	100.0%	
Republican hold				

== Agriculture Commissioner ==
2022 Georgia Agriculture Commissioner election
- November 8, 2022

Nominee	Tyler Harper	Nakita Hemingway
Party	Republican	Democratic
Popular vote	2,068,892	1,751,214
Percentage	53.0%	44.8%
- Harper: 40–50% 50–60% 60–70% 70–80% 80–90% >90% Hemingway: 40–50% 50–60% 60–70% 70–80% 80–90% >90%
Commissioner before election
Gary Black
Republican
Elected Commissioner
Tyler Harper
Republican

Incumbent Republican commissioner Gary Black was eligible to seek a fourth term in office, but instead chose to run for U.S. Senate.

=== Republican primary ===
==== Candidates ====
===== Nominee =====
- Tyler Harper, state senator

===== Declined =====
- Gary Black, incumbent commissioner (ran for U.S. Senate)

==== Endorsements ====
Tyler Harper

Governors

- Roy Barnes, former governor of Georgia (1999–2003) (Democrat)

State legislators

- John Albers, state senator
- Jason Anavitarte, state senator
- Brandon Beach, state senator
- Matt Brass, state senator
- Dean Burke, state senator
- Max Burns, state senator
- Bill Cowsert, state senator
- Clint Dixon, state senator
- Greg Dolezal, state senator
- Mike Dugan, majority leader of the Georgia Senate
- Frank Ginn, state senator
- Steve Gooch, state senator
- Russ Goodman, state senator
- Marty Harbin, state senator
- Bo Hatchett, state senator
- Billy Hickman, state senator
- Chuck Hufstetler, state senator
- Burt Jones, state senator and candidate for lieutenant governor in 2022
- John Kennedy, state senator
- Kay Kirkpatrick, state senator
- Sheila McNeill, state senator
- Jeff Mullis, state senator
- Chuck Payne, state senator
- Randy Robertson, state senator
- Brian Strickland, state senator
- Carden Summers, state senator
- Lindsey Tippins, state senator
- Ben Watson, state senator

==== Primary results ====
Republican primary results
Party	Candidate	Votes	%
Republican	Tyler Harper	1,029,564	100.0%
Total votes		1,029,564	100.0%

=== Democratic primary ===
==== Candidates ====
===== Nominee =====
- Nakita Hemingway, cut-flower farmer

===== Eliminated in primary =====
- Winfred Dukes, state representative
- Fred Swann, mushroom farmer and nominee for agriculture commissioner in 2018

===== Did not file =====
- Deborah Jackson, attorney, former mayor of Lithonia, and candidate for U.S. Senate in 2020

==== Endorsements ====
Winfred Dukes

Statewide politicians

- Mark Taylor, former lieutenant governor of Georgia
Nakita Hemingway

State legislators

- Donna McLeod, state representative
- Curt Thompson, former state senator

Political parties

- Working Families Party

Organizations

- Indivisible movement

==== Primary results ====
Democratic primary results
Party	Candidate	Votes	%
Democratic	Nakita Hemingway	375,435	56.25%
Democratic	Winfred Dukes	190,936	28.61%
Democratic	Fred Swann	101,093	15.15%
Total votes		667,464	100.0%

=== Libertarian primary ===
==== Candidates ====
===== Nominee =====
- David Raudabaugh, salesman

=== General election ===
==== Debate ====
2022 Georgia Agriculture Commissioner debate
No.	Date	Host	Moderator	Link	Republican	Democratic	Libertarian
Key: P Participant A Absent N Not invited I Invited W Withdrawn							
Key: P Participant A Absent N Not invited I Invited W Withdrawn					Tyler Harper	Nakita Hemingway	David Raudabaugh
1	Oct. 17, 2022	Atlanta Press Club	Condace Pressley	YouTube	P	P	P

==== Results ====
2022 Georgia Agriculture Commissioner election
Party	Candidate	Votes	%	±%
Republican	Tyler Harper	2,068,892	52.97%	−0.11%
Democratic	Nakita Hemingway	1,751,214	44.84%	−2.08%
Libertarian	David Raudabaugh	85,656	2.19%	N/A
Total votes		3,905,762	100.0%	
Republican hold				

== Public Service Commission ==
On August 19, 2022, the U.S. Supreme Court upheld a ruling by Judge Steven D. Grimberg in the case Rose v. Raffensperger postponing both Georgia Public Service Commission elections which were due to be held on November 8, 2022. As a result, the following nominees for Districts 2 and 3 were removed from the general election ballot. The elections were held in 2025.

=== District 2 ===
Incumbent Republican Commissioner Tim Echols ran for re-election.

==== Republican primary ====
===== Nominee =====
- Tim Echols, incumbent commissioner

==== Democratic primary ====
===== Nominee =====
- Patty Durand, former president of the Smart Energy Consumer Collaborative

===== Withdrew =====
- Russell Edwards, Athens-Clarke County commissioner (endorsed Durand, remained on ballot)

===== Primary results =====
2022 Georgia Public Service Commission District 2 Democratic primary
Party	Candidate	Votes	%
Democratic	Patty Durand	392,357	60.44%
Democratic	Russell Matthews	256,769	39.56%
Total votes		649,126	100.0%

==== Libertarian primary ====
===== Nominee =====
- Colin McKinney, physician

=== District 3 (special) ===
On July 21, 2021, Republican Fitz Johnson was appointed by Governor Kemp to fill the vacancy created when incumbent commissioner Chuck Eaton resigned after being appointed to the Fulton County Superior Court. Johnson would run in the special election to serve the remainder of Eaton's term.

==== Republican primary ====
===== Nominee =====
- Fitz Johnson, incumbent commissioner

==== Democratic primary ====
===== Nominee =====
- Sheila Edwards, public relations professional and community activist

===== Eliminated in primary =====
- Chandra Farley, energy consultant and chair of the Georgia NAACP Environmental and Climate Justice Committee
- Missy Moore, commercial insurance agency owner

===== Primary results =====
2022 Georgia Public Service Commission District 3 Democratic primary
Party	Candidate	Votes	%
Democratic	Sheila Edwards	358,738	54.68%
Democratic	Chandra Farley	200,780	30.60%
Democratic	Missy Moore	96,588	14.72%
Total votes		656,106	100.0%

== General Assembly ==
All 56 seats in the Georgia Senate and 180 seats in the Georgia House of Representatives were up for election.

=== Georgia State Senate ===
Party	Before	After	Change
Republican	34	33	▼1
Democratic	22	23	▲1
Total	56	56	

=== Georgia House of Representatives ===
Party	Before	After	Change
Republican	103	101	▼2
Democratic	77	79	▲2
Total	180	180	

== District attorneys ==
9 out of 49 judicial circuits held elections for district attorney.

== Judicial elections ==
Three seats on the Supreme Court of Georgia were up for nonpartisan statewide election to succeed justices Verda Colvin, Carla Wong McMillian and Shawn Ellen LaGrua. Of these three, only Colvin's seat was contested by attorney Veronica Brinson, the Democratic nominee for Georgia's 25th State Senate district in 2020. Colvin won the election on May 24 with 68% of the votes.

=== Colvin's seat ===
Results by county Colvin: 50–60%; 60–70%; 70–80%; 80–90%; No votes

2022 Georgia Supreme Court election
Party	Candidate	Votes	%
Nonpartisan	Verda Colvin (incumbent)	1,168,175	68.32%
Nonpartisan	Veronica Brinson	541,628	31.68%
Total votes		1,709,803	100.0%

Elections were also held for three seats on the Georgia Court of Appeals to succeed judges Anne Elizabeth Barnes, Chris McFadden and Trea Pipkin. All three won their races uncontested.

== Local elections ==
During the regular primary, most counties and several consolidated city-county governments held nonpartisan elections for mayor, select city council or county commission seats, and select board of education seats, including Columbus, Athens, and Augusta.

== Ballot measures ==
=== Amendment 1 ===
Results by county Yes: >90%; 80–90%; 70–80%; Other: No votes

"Suspend Compensation for Assembly Members and Public Officials Indicted for a Felony Measure"

To suspend compensation for public officials while the individual is suspended from office for a felony indictment.

Amendment 1
Choice	Votes	%
For	3,375,437	88.48
Against	439,514	11.52
Total	3,814,951	100.00

=== Amendment 2 ===
Results by county Yes: >90%; 80–90%; Other: No votes

"Temporary Property Tax Change for Disaster Areas Measure"

To authorize local governments to grant tax relief to properties that are damaged due to a disaster and located within a declared disaster area.

Amendment 2
Choice	Votes	%
For	3,532,212	91.85
Against	313,308	8.15
Total	3,845,520	100.00

=== Referendum A ===
Results by county Yes: 70–80%; 60–70%; 50–60%

"Timber Equipment Exempt from Property Taxes Measure"

To exempt timber equipment owned by a timber producer from property taxes.

Referendum A
Choice	Votes	%
For	2,222,571	59.00
Against	1,544,431	41.00
Total	3,767,002	100.00

=== Referendum B ===
Results by county Yes: 80–90%; 70–80%; 60–70%; Other: No votes

"Merged Family-Owned Farms and Dairy and Eggs Tax Exemption Measure"

To expand agricultural equipment tax exemption and produce to include those owned by merged family farms.

Referendum B
Choice	Votes	%
For	2,885,541	76.46
Against	888,336	23.54
Total	3,773,877	100.00

== Notes ==
Partisan clients
