= 2022 United States House of Representatives elections in Georgia =

- November 8, 2022

All 14 Georgia seats to the United States House of Representatives
	Majority party	Minority party
Party	Republican	Democratic
Last election	8	6
Seats won	9	5
Seat change	▲1	▼1
Popular vote	2,043,842	1,863,870
Percentage	52.31%	47.69%
Swing	▲1.31%	▼1.31%

Republican hold Republican gain
Democratic hold
Republican
50–60%
60–70%
70–80%
80–90%
>90%
Democratic
50–60%
60–70%
70–80%
80–90%

The 2022 United States House of Representatives elections in Georgia were held on November 8, 2022, to elect the 14 U.S. representatives from the state of Georgia, one from each of the state's congressional districts. The elections coincided with the Georgia gubernatorial election, other elections to the U.S. House of Representatives, elections to the U.S. Senate, and various state and local elections.

== Results summary ==
=== Statewide ===
Party	Candi- dates	Votes		Seats		
Party	Candi- dates	No.	%	No.	+/–	%
Republican Party	14	2,044,102	52.31%	9	▲1	64.29%
Democratic Party	14	1,863,870	47.69%	5	▼1	35.71%
Total	28	3,907,972	100%	14	Steady	100%

Popular vote
Republican	52.31%
Democratic	47.69%

House seats
Republican	64.29%
Democratic	35.71%

=== District ===
Results of the 2022 United States House of Representatives elections in Georgia by district:

District	Republican		Democratic		Total		Result
District	Votes	%	Votes	%	Votes	%	Result
District 1	156,128	59.15%	107,837	40.85%	263,965	100.00%	Republican hold
District 2	108,665	45.03%	132,675	54.97%	241,340	100.00%	Democratic hold
District 3	213,524	68.75%	97,057	31.25%	310,581	100.00%	Republican hold
District 4	59,302	21.51%	216,332	78.49%	275,634	100.00%	Democratic hold
District 5	51,769	17.52%	243,687	82.48%	295,456	100.00%	Democratic hold
District 6	206,886	62.22%	125,612	37.78%	332,498	100.00%	Republican gain
District 7	91,262	38.95%	143,063	61.05%	234,325	100.00%	Democratic hold
District 8	178,700	68.58%	81,886	31.42%	260,586	100.00%	Republican hold
District 9	212,820	72.35%	81,318	27.65%	294,138	100.00%	Republican hold
District 10	198,523	64.53%	109,107	35.47%	307,630	100.00%	Republican hold
District 11	190,086	62.6%	113,571	37.4%	303,657	100.00%	Republican hold
District 12	158,047	59.6%	107,148	40.4%	265,195	100.00%	Republican hold
District 13	48,228	18.22%	216,388	81.78%	264,616	100.00%	Democratic hold
District 14	170,162	65.86%	88,189	34.14%	258,351	100.00%	Republican hold
Total	2,044,102	52.31%	1,863,870	47.69%	3,907,972	100%	

== District 1 ==
2022 Georgia's 1st congressional district election
- November 8, 2022
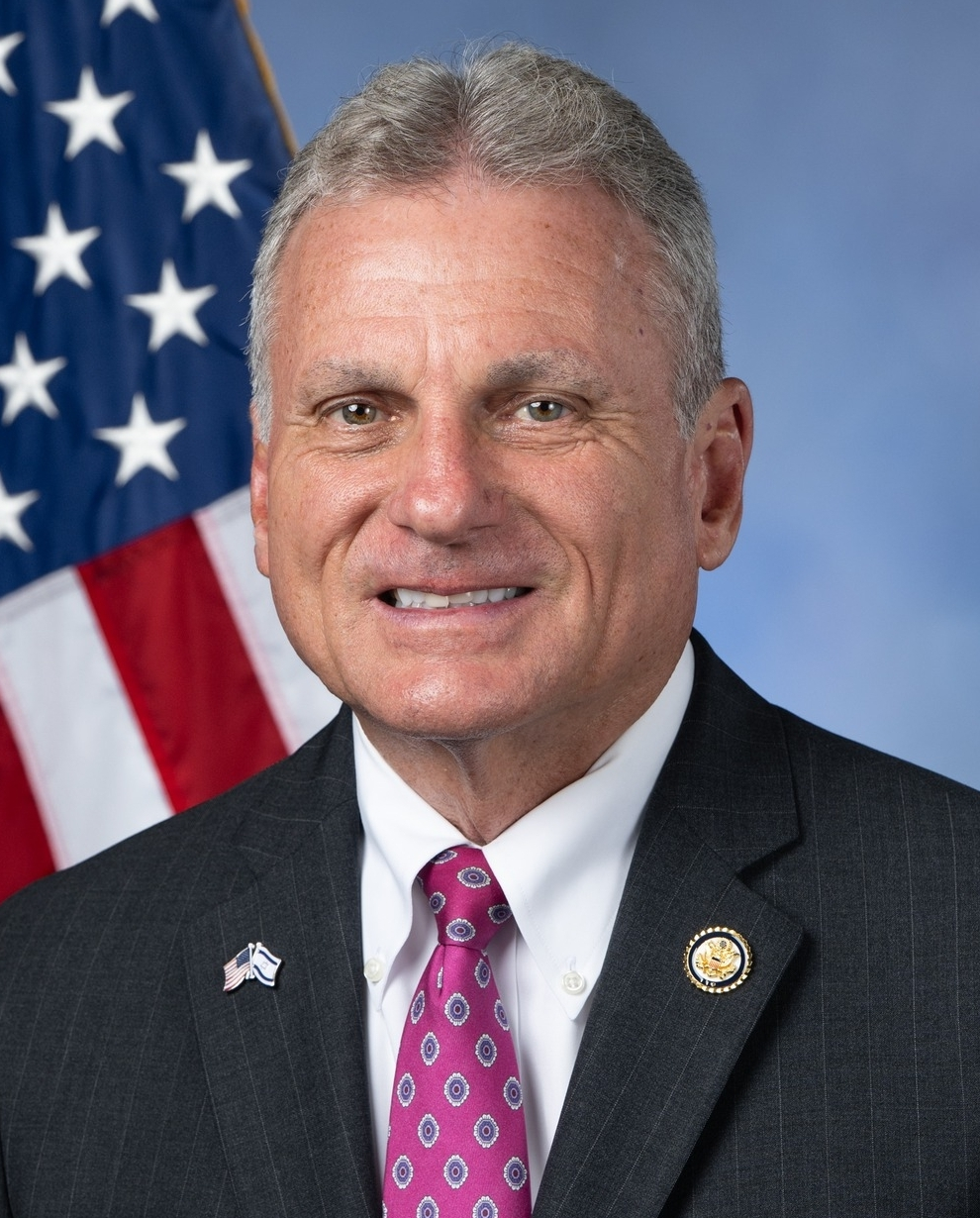

Nominee	Buddy Carter	Wade Herring
Party	Republican	Democratic
Popular vote	156,128	107,837
Percentage	59.15%	40.85%
- Carter: 50–60% 60–70% 70–80% 80–90% >90% Herring: 50–60% 60–70% 70–80% 80–90% >90% No votes
U.S. Representative before election
Buddy Carter
Republican
Elected U.S. Representative
Buddy Carter
Republican

The 1st district is based in the southeast corner of the state, encompassing Savannah and lower areas. Republican Buddy Carter, who had represented the district since 2015, was re-elected with 58.3% of the vote in 2020. Carter ran for re-election.

=== Republican primary ===
==== Candidates ====
===== Nominee =====
- Buddy Carter, incumbent U.S. representative

==== Results ====
Republican primary results
Party	Candidate	Votes	%
Republican	Buddy Carter (incumbent)	80,757	100.0
Total votes		80,757	100.0

=== Democratic primary ===
==== Candidates ====
===== Nominee =====
- Wade Herring, attorney

===== Eliminated in runoff =====
- Joyce Griggs, retired lieutenant colonel, businesswoman, and nominee for this seat in 2020

===== Eliminated in primary =====
- Michelle Munroe, nurse/midwife and veteran

==== Endorsements ====
Joyce Griggs

Organizations

- Democrats for Life of America
Wade Herring

State legislators

- Derek Mallow, state representative from the 163rd district (2021–present)
- Al Williams, state representative from the 168th district (2003–present)

Local officials

- Otis Johnson, former mayor of Savannah (2004–2012)

Individuals

- Bertice Berry, sociologist, author, lecturer, and educator

==== Results ====
Democratic primary results
Party	Candidate	Votes	%
Democratic	Joyce Marie Griggs	21,891	48.6
Democratic	Wade Herring	17,118	38.0
Democratic	Michelle Munroe	6,043	13.4
Total votes		45,052	100.0

==== Primary runoff results ====
Democratic primary runoff results
Party	Candidate	Votes	%
Democratic	Wade Herring	12,880	61.9
Democratic	Joyce Marie Griggs	7,918	38.1
Total votes		20,798	100.0

=== General election ===
==== Predictions ====
Source	Ranking	As of
The Cook Political Report	Solid R	December 30, 2021
Inside Elections	Solid R	February 4, 2022
Sabato's Crystal Ball	Safe R	January 4, 2022
Politico	Solid R	April 5, 2022
RCP	Safe R	June 9, 2022
Fox News	Solid R	July 11, 2022
DDHQ	Solid R	July 20, 2022
538	Solid R	June 30, 2022
The Economist	Safe R	September 28, 2022

==== Results ====
Georgia's 1st congressional district, 2022
Party	Candidate	Votes	%
Republican	Buddy Carter (incumbent)	156,128	59.1
Democratic	Wade Herring	107,837	40.9
Total votes		263,965	100.0
Republican hold			

== District 2 ==
2022 Georgia's 2nd congressional district election
- November 8, 2022
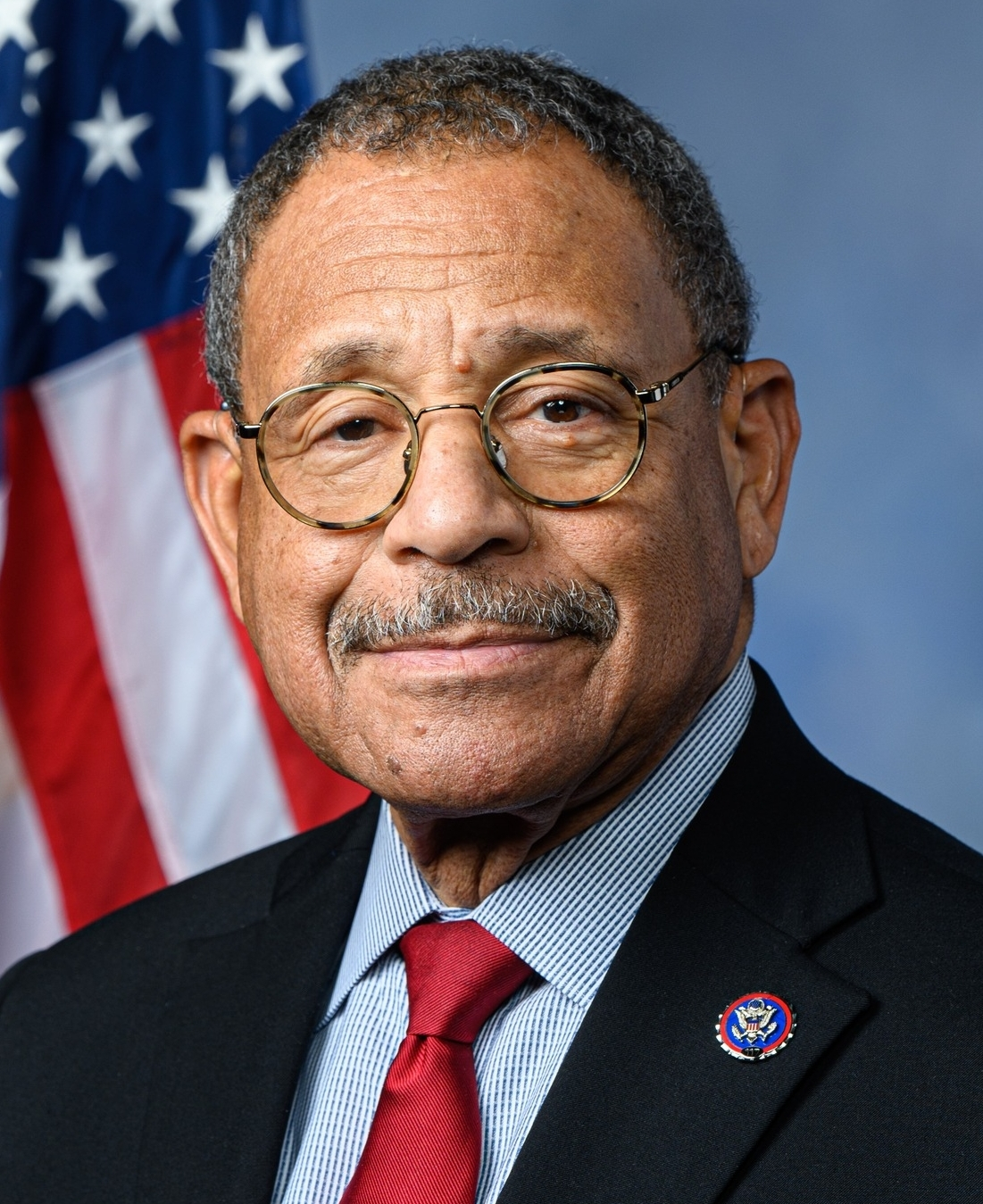

Nominee	Sanford Bishop	Chris West
Party	Democratic	Republican
Popular vote	132,675	108,665
Percentage	54.97%	45.03%
- Bishop: 50–60% 60–70% 70–80% 80–90% >90% West: 50–60% 60–70% 70–80% 80–90% No votes
U.S. Representative before election
Sanford Bishop
Democratic
Elected U.S. Representative
Sanford Bishop
Democratic

The 2nd district encompasses the Southwest corner of the state, including most of Columbus. Democrat Sanford Bishop, who had represented the district since 1993, was re-elected with 59.1% of the vote in 2020. Bishop ran for re-election.

=== Democratic primary ===
==== Candidates ====
===== Nominee =====
- Sanford Bishop, incumbent U.S. representative

===== Eliminated in primary =====
- Joseph O'Hara

==== Endorsements ====
Sanford Bishop

Organizations

- American Israel Public Affairs Committee
- Planned Parenthood Action Fund

==== Results ====
Democratic primary results
Party	Candidate	Votes	%
Democratic	Sanford Bishop (incumbent)	54,991	93.5
Democratic	Joseph O'Hara	3,814	6.5
Total votes		58,805	100.0

=== Republican primary ===
==== Candidates ====
===== Nominee =====
- Chris West, attorney

===== Eliminated in runoff =====
- Jeremy Hunt, former U.S. Army captain

===== Eliminated in primary =====
- Vivian Childs, businesswoman and former educator
- Wayne Johnson, former chief operating officer of the Office of Federal Student Aid and candidate for U.S. Senate in 2020
- Rich Robertson, attorney
- Paul Whitehead, teacher

===== Withdrawn =====
- Tracy Taylor, firefighter (endorsed Hunt)

==== Endorsements ====
Vivian Childs

Organizations

- Maggie's List
Jeremy Hunt

Executive branch officials

- Nikki Haley, former U.S. ambassador to the United Nations (2017–2018)
- Mike Pompeo, former U.S. secretary of state (2018–2021)

U.S. senators

- Marsha Blackburn, U.S. senator from Tennessee (2019–present)
- Tom Cotton, U.S. senator from Arkansas (2015–present)
- Josh Hawley, U.S. senator from Missouri (2019–present)
- Tim Scott, U.S. senator from South Carolina (2013–present)

U.S. representatives

- Elise Stefanik, U.S. representative from New York's 21st congressional district (2015–present)

Organizations

- Black Conservative Federation
- SEAL PAC

Individuals

- Tracy Taylor, firefighter
Chris West

U.S. senators

- Kelly Loeffler, former U.S. senator from Georgia (2020–2021)

==== Results ====
Results by county: West: 40–50%; 50–60%; Hunt: 40–50%; 50–60%; 60–70%; 70–80%; Johnson: 40–50%

Republican primary results
Party	Candidate	Votes	%
Republican	Jeremy Hunt	22,923	37.0
Republican	Chris West	18,658	30.1
Republican	Wayne Johnson	11,574	18.7
Republican	Vivian Childs	3,986	6.4
Republican	Rich Robertson	2,832	4.6
Republican	Paul Whitehead	2,037	3.3
Total votes		62,010	100.0

==== Runoff debate ====
2022 Georgia's 10th congressional district Republican primary runoff debate
No.	Date	Host	Moderator	Link	Republican	Republican
Key: P Participant A Absent N Not invited I Invited W Withdrawn						
Key: P Participant A Absent N Not invited I Invited W Withdrawn					Jeremy Hunt	Chris West
1	Jun. 6, 2022	Atlanta Press Club	Jennifer Bellamy		P	P

==== Primary runoff results ====
Results by county: West: 50–60%; 60–70%; 70–80%; Hunt: 50–60%; 60–70%; 70–80%; 80–90%; >90%

Republican primary runoff results
Party	Candidate	Votes	%
Republican	Chris West	14,622	51.3
Republican	Jeremy Hunt	13,875	48.7
Total votes		28,497	100.0

=== General election ===
==== Predictions ====
Source	Ranking	As of
The Cook Political Report	Likely D	December 30, 2021
Inside Elections	Solid D	October 21, 2022
Sabato's Crystal Ball	Likely D	July 28, 2022
Politico	Lean D	November 7, 2022
RCP	Tossup	October 17, 2022
Fox News	Lean D	August 22, 2022
DDHQ	Likely D	July 20, 2022
538	Likely D	October 18, 2022
The Economist	Lean D	November 1, 2022

==== Polling ====
Poll source	Date(s) administered	Sample size (Note: Key: A – all adults RV – registered voters LV – likely voters V – unclear)	Margin of error	Sanford Bishop (D)	Chris West (R)	Undecided
InsiderAdvantage (R)	October 17, 2022	550 (LV)	± 4.2%	47%	44%	9%
The Trafalgar Group (R)	October 14–16, 2022	515 (LV)	± 4.2%	50%	46%	3%

==== Debate ====
2022 Georgia's 2nd congressional district debate
No.	Date	Host	Moderator	Link	Democratic	Republican
Key: P Participant A Absent N Not invited I Invited W Withdrawn						
Key: P Participant A Absent N Not invited I Invited W Withdrawn					Sanford Bishop	Chris West
1		Atlanta Press Club; Georgia Public Broadcasting	Frank Malloy		P	P

==== Results ====
Georgia's 2nd congressional district, 2022
Party	Candidate	Votes	%
Democratic	Sanford Bishop (incumbent)	132,675	55.0
Republican	Chris West	108,665	45.0
Total votes		241,340	100.0
Democratic hold			

== District 3 ==
2022 Georgia's 3rd congressional district election
- November 8, 2022
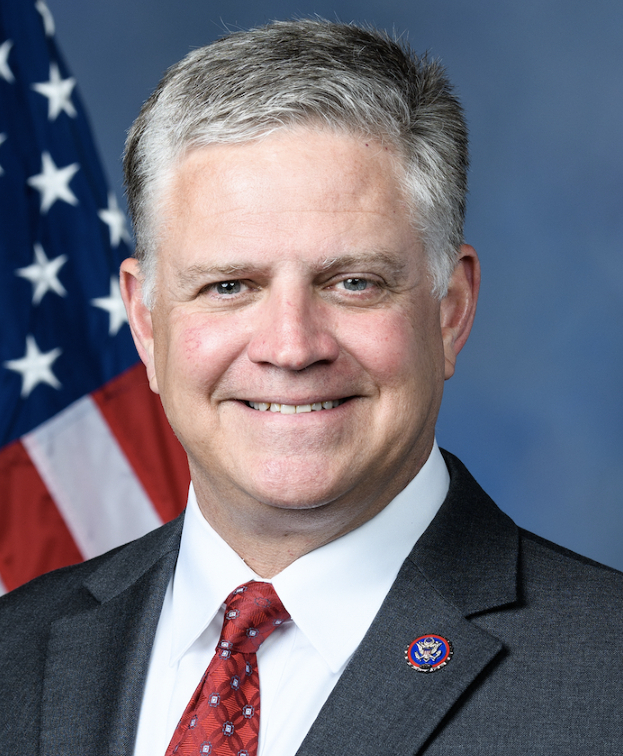

Nominee	Drew Ferguson	Val Almonord
Party	Republican	Democratic
Popular vote	213,524	97,057
Percentage	68.75%	31.25%
- Ferguson: 50–60% 60–70% 70–80% 80–90% >90% Almonord: 50–60% 60–70% 70–80% 80–90%
U.S. Representative before election
Drew Ferguson
Republican
Elected U.S. Representative
Drew Ferguson
Republican

The 3rd district comprises central-west Georgia, containing the Northern suburbs of Columbus. Republican Drew Ferguson, who had represented the district since 2017, was re-elected with 65.0% of the vote in 2020. He ran for re-election.

=== Republican primary ===
==== Candidates ====
===== Nominee =====
- Drew Ferguson, incumbent U.S. representative

===== Eliminated in primary =====
- Jared Benjamin Craig, attorney

==== Results ====
Republican primary results
Party	Candidate	Votes	%
Republican	Drew Ferguson (incumbent)	96,314	82.7
Republican	Jared Benjamin Craig	20,175	17.3
Total votes		116,489	100.0

=== Democratic primary ===
==== Candidates ====
===== Nominee =====
- Val Almonord, retired physician and nominee for this district in 2020

==== Results ====
Democratic primary results
Party	Candidate	Votes	%
Democratic	Val Almonord	32,207	100.0
Total votes		32,207	100.0

=== General election ===
==== Predictions ====
Source	Ranking	As of
The Cook Political Report	Solid R	December 30, 2021
Inside Elections	Solid R	February 4, 2022
Sabato's Crystal Ball	Safe R	January 4, 2022
Politico	Solid R	April 5, 2022
RCP	Safe R	June 9, 2022
Fox News	Solid R	July 11, 2022
DDHQ	Solid R	July 20, 2022
538	Solid R	June 30, 2022
The Economist	Safe R	September 28, 2022

==== Results ====
Georgia's 3rd congressional district, 2022
Party	Candidate	Votes	%
Republican	Drew Ferguson (incumbent)	213,524	68.8
Democratic	Val Almonord	97,057	31.2
Total votes		310,581	100.0
Republican hold			

== District 4 ==
2022 Georgia's 4th congressional district election
- November 8, 2022
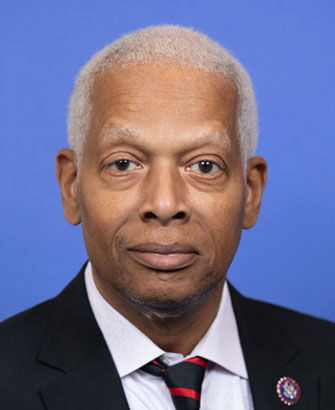

Nominee	Hank Johnson	Jonathan Chavez
Party	Democratic	Republican
Popular vote	216,332	59,302
Percentage	78.49%	21.51%
- Johnson: 50–60% 60–70% 70–80% 80–90% >90% Chavez: 50–60%
U.S. Representative before election
Hank Johnson
Democratic
Elected U.S. Representative
Hank Johnson
Democratic

The 4th district is based in the southeast suburbs and regions of Atlanta. Incumbent Democrat Hank Johnson, who had represented the district since 2007, was re-elected with 80.1% of the vote in 2020, and declared his candidacy for re-election.

=== Democratic primary ===
==== Candidates ====
===== Nominee =====
- Hank Johnson, incumbent U.S. representative

==== Endorsements ====
Hank Johnson

Organizations

- Planned Parenthood Action Fund
- Sierra Club

==== Results ====
Democratic primary results
Party	Candidate	Votes	%
Democratic	Hank Johnson (incumbent)	84,773	100.0
Total votes		84,773	100.0

=== Republican primary ===
==== Candidates ====
===== Nominee =====
- Jonathan Chavez, clinical director of operations

===== Eliminated in primary =====
- Surrea Ivy, manager and activist

==== Results ====
Republican primary results
Party	Candidate	Votes	%
Republican	Jonathan Chavez	21,924	78.3
Republican	Surrea Ivy	6,078	21.7
Total votes		28,002	100.0

=== General election ===
==== Predictions ====
Source	Ranking	As of
The Cook Political Report	Solid D	December 30, 2021
Inside Elections	Solid D	February 4, 2022
Sabato's Crystal Ball	Safe D	January 4, 2022
Politico	Solid D	April 5, 2022
RCP	Safe D	June 9, 2022
Fox News	Solid D	July 11, 2022
DDHQ	Solid D	July 20, 2022
538	Solid D	June 30, 2022
The Economist	Safe D	September 28, 2022

==== Results ====
Georgia's 4th congressional district, 2022
Party	Candidate	Votes	%
Democratic	Hank Johnson (incumbent)	216,332	78.5
Republican	Jonathan Chavez	59,302	21.5
Total votes		275,634	100.0
Democratic hold			

== District 5 ==
2022 Georgia's 5th congressional district election
- November 8, 2022
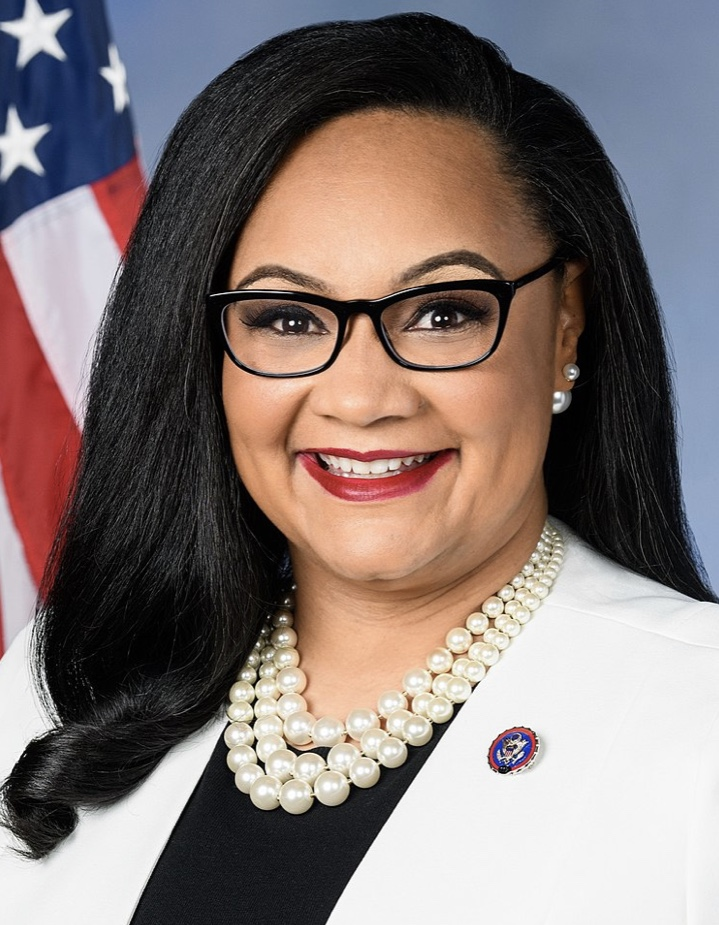

Nominee	Nikema Williams	Christian Zimm
Party	Democratic	Republican
Popular vote	243,687	51,769
Percentage	82.5%	17.5%
- Williams: 50–60% 60–70% 70–80% 80–90% >90% Zimm: 50–60% 60–70%
U.S. Representative before election
Nikema Williams
Democratic
Elected U.S. Representative
Nikema Williams
Democratic

The 5th district comprises most of central Atlanta. Incumbent Democrat Nikema Williams, who had represented the district since 2021, was elected with 85.1% of the vote in 2020, and declared her candidacy for re-election.

=== Democratic primary ===
==== Candidates ====
===== Nominee =====
- Nikema Williams, incumbent U.S. representative

===== Eliminated in primary =====
- Charlotte Macbagito, commercial real estate underwriter
- Valencia Stovall, former state representative and independent candidate for U.S. Senate in 2020 (special)

==== Endorsements ====
Nikema Williams

Organizations

- Democracy for America
- End Citizens United
- Feminist Majority PAC
- League of Conservation Voters
- NARAL Pro-Choice America
- Planned Parenthood Action Fund
- Sierra Club

==== Results ====
Democratic primary results
Party	Candidate	Votes	%
Democratic	Nikema Williams (incumbent)	78,440	86.3
Democratic	Valencia Stovall	8,701	9.6
Democratic	Charlotte Macbagito	3,791	4.2
Total votes		90,932	100.0

=== Republican primary ===
==== Candidates ====
===== Nominee =====
- Christian Zimm, attorney

==== Results ====
Republican primary results
Party	Candidate	Votes	%
Republican	Christian Zimm	21,540	100.0
Total votes		21,540	100.0

=== General election ===
==== Predictions ====
Source	Ranking	As of
The Cook Political Report	Solid D	December 30, 2021
Inside Elections	Solid D	February 4, 2022
Sabato's Crystal Ball	Safe D	January 4, 2022
Politico	Solid D	April 5, 2022
RCP	Safe D	June 9, 2022
Fox News	Solid D	July 11, 2022
DDHQ	Solid D	July 20, 2022
538	Solid D	June 30, 2022
The Economist	Safe D	September 28, 2022

==== Results ====
Georgia's 5th congressional district, 2022
Party	Candidate	Votes	%
Democratic	Nikema Williams (incumbent)	243,687	82.5
Republican	Christian Zimm	51,769	17.5
Total votes		295,456	100.0
Democratic hold			

== District 6 ==
2022 Georgia's 6th congressional district election
- November 8, 2022
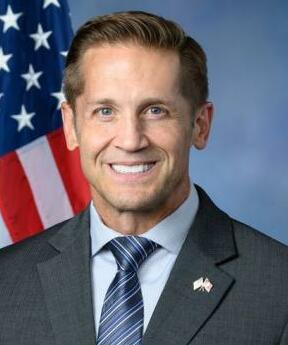

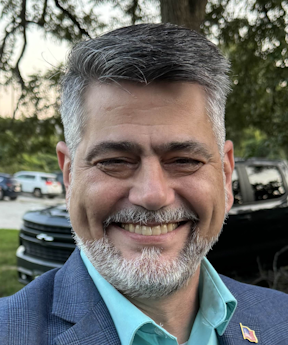
Nominee	Rich McCormick	Bob Christian
Party	Republican	Democratic
Popular vote	206,886	125,612
Percentage	62.22%	37.78%
- County results McCormick: 50–60% 70–80% 80–90%
U.S. Representative before election
None (new seat)
Elected U.S. Representative
Rich McCormick
Republican

The new 6th district comprises suburban and rural regions north of Atlanta. The incumbent was Democrat Lucy McBath, who had represented the district since 2019, and she was re-elected with 54.6% of the vote in 2020. She ran for re-election in Georgia's 7th congressional district as the new 6th district heavily favored the Republican Party.

=== Republican primary ===
==== Candidates ====
===== Nominee =====
- Rich McCormick, physician and nominee for Georgia's 7th congressional district in 2020

===== Eliminated in runoff =====
- Jake Evans, former chairman of the Georgia Ethics Commission and son of former U.S. ambassador to Luxembourg Randy Evans

===== Eliminated in primary =====
- Byron Gatewood, businessman and veteran
- Meagan Hanson, former state representative
- Blake Harbin, businessman and candidate for this seat in 2020
- Mary Mallory Staples, teacher
- Paulette Smith, candidate for this seat in 2020
- Suzi Voyles, chairwoman of conservative group Maggie's List
- Eugene Yu, businessman and perennial candidate

===== Withdrawn =====
- Elfreda Desvignes
- Harold Earls, author and veteran
- Eric Welsh, retired U.S. Army colonel and former Coca-Cola executive

===== Declined =====
- Will Wade, state representative

==== Endorsements ====
Jake Evans

Executive branch officials

- Pete Hoekstra, United States ambassador to the Netherlands (2018–2021), Republican candidate for U.S. Senate in 2012, former U.S. representative for Michigan's 2nd congressional district (1993–2011)
- Ed McMullen, U.S. ambassador to Switzerland and Liechtenstein (2017–2021)
- Kash Patel, former chief of staff to the acting United States secretary of defense
- Donald Trump, 45th president of the United States (2017–2021)
- Matthew Whitaker, former US attorney general

U.S. representatives

- Bob Barr, former U.S. representative from Georgia's 7th congressional district (1995–2003)
- Dan Bishop, U.S. representative from North Carolina's 9th congressional district (2019–present)
- Newt Gingrich, former speaker of the United States House of Representatives (1995–1999), former House minority whip (1989–1995), former chair of the House Republican Conference (1995–1999), former U.S. representative from Georgia's 6th congressional district (1979–1999)

Individuals

- Brigitte Gabriel, Lebanese-American conservative author
- Sean Hannity, conservative political commentator (Conservative Party)
- Bo Hines, Republican nominee for the United States House of Representatives in North Carolina's 13th congressional district

Organizations

- American Conservative Union
Meagan Hanson

U.S. representatives

- Elise Stefanik, chair of the House Republican Conference (2021–present), U.S. representative from New York's 21st congressional district (2015–present)

State legislators

- Terry England, state representative from the 116th district (2013–present); 108th district (2005–2013)
- Brett Harrell, former state representative from the 106th district (2011–2021)
- Don Parsons, state representative from the 44th district (2013–present); 42nd district (1995–2013)
- Alan Powell, state representative from the 32nd district (2013–present); 29th district (2005–2013); 23rd district (1991–2005)
- Richard H. Smith, state representative from the 134th district (2005–present)
- Wendell Willard, former state representative from the 51st district (2001–2019)
- Bruce Williamson, state representative from the 115th district (2013–present); 111th district (2011–2013)
Rich McCormick

U.S. senators

- Ted Cruz, U.S. senator from Texas (2013–present), former solicitor general of Texas (2003–2008)

U.S. representatives

- Jack Bergman, U.S. representative from Michigan's 1st congressional district (2017–present)
- Pat Fallon, U.S. representative from Texas's 4th congressional district (2021–present), former Texas state senator from the 30th district (2019–2021), former Texas state representative from the 106th district (2013–2019)
- Ronny Jackson, U.S. representative from Texas's 13th congressional district (2021–present), former chief medical advisor to the president (2019), former physician to the president (2013–2018)
- Troy Nehls, U.S. representative from Texas's 22nd congressional district (2021–present), former sheriff of Fort Bend County (2013–2021)
- Burgess Owens, U.S. representative from Utah's 4th congressional district (2021–present)
- Steve Scalise, U.S. representative from Louisiana's 1st congressional district (2008–) (post-primary, pre-runoff)
- Michael Waltz, U.S. representative from Florida's 6th congressional district (2019–present)

State legislators

- Clint Dixon, Georgia state senator from the 45th district (2021–present)
- Greg Dolezal, Georgia state senator from the 27th district (2019–present)

Organizations

- Club for Growth
- SEAL PAC
- Stand for Health Freedom
Suzi Voyles

Organizations

- Maggie's List

==== Polling ====
Poll source	Date(s) administered	Sample size	Margin of error	Jake Evans	Byron Gatewood	Meagan Hanson	Blake Harbin	Rich McCormick	Paulette Smith	Mallory Staples	Suzi Voyles	Eugene Yu	Undecided
Public Opinion Strategies (R) (Note: Poll sponsored by McCormick's campaign)	April 30 – May 2, 2022	300 (LV)	± 5.7%	13%	1%	2%	2%	38%	1%	7%	1%	2%	33%
Public Opinion Strategies (R)	January 26–27, 2022	300 (LV)	± 5.7%	3%	–	3%	3%	25%	–	2%	–	–	64%

==== Results ====
Results by county: McCormick: 30–40%; 40–50%; 50–60%; 60–70%

Republican primary results
Party	Candidate	Votes	%
Republican	Rich McCormick	48,967	43.1
Republican	Jake Evans	26,160	23.0
Republican	Mary Mallory Staples	10,178	9.0
Republican	Meagan Hanson	9,539	8.4
Republican	Eugene Yu	7,411	6.5
Republican	Blake Harbin	4,171	3.7
Republican	Byron Gatewood	3,358	3.0
Republican	Suzi Voyles	2,646	2.3
Republican	Paulette Smith	1,123	1.0
Total votes		113,553	100.0

==== Primary runoff results ====
Results by county: McCormick: 50–60%; 60–70%; 70–80%

Republican primary runoff results
Party	Candidate	Votes	%
Republican	Rich McCormick	27,455	66.5
Republican	Jake Evans	13,808	33.5
Total votes		41,263	100.0

=== Democratic primary ===
==== Candidates ====
===== Nominee =====
- Bob Christian, veteran

===== Eliminated in primary =====
- Wayne White, consultant

===== Declined =====
- Lucy McBath, incumbent U.S. representative (running in the 7th District)

==== Endorsements ====
Bob Christian

Organizations

- AFL–CIO
- Vote Common Good

==== Results ====
Democratic primary results
Party	Candidate	Votes	%
Democratic	Bob Christian	18,776	55.6
Democratic	Wayne White	15,025	44.4
Total votes		33,801	100.0

=== General election ===
==== Predictions ====
Source	Ranking	As of
The Cook Political Report	Solid R (flip)	December 30, 2021
Inside Elections	Likely R (flip)	February 4, 2022
Sabato's Crystal Ball	Safe R (flip)	January 4, 2022
Politico	Solid R (flip)	April 5, 2022
RCP	Safe R (flip)	June 9, 2022
Fox News	Solid R (flip)	July 11, 2022
DDHQ	Solid R (flip)	July 20, 2022
538	Solid R (flip)	June 30, 2022
The Economist	Safe R (flip)	September 28, 2022

==== Debate ====
2022 Georgia's 6th congressional district debate
No.	Date	Host	Moderator	Link	Democratic	Republican
Key: P Participant A Absent N Not invited I Invited W Withdrawn						
Key: P Participant A Absent N Not invited I Invited W Withdrawn					Bob Christian	Rich McCormick
1		Atlanta Press Club; Georgia Public Broadcasting	Jim Burress		P	P

==== Results ====
Georgia's 6th congressional district, 2022
Party	Candidate	Votes	%
Republican	Rich McCormick	206,886	62.2
Democratic	Bob Christian	125,612	37.8
Total votes		332,498	100.0
Republican win (new seat)			

== District 7 ==
2022 Georgia's 7th congressional district election
- November 8, 2022
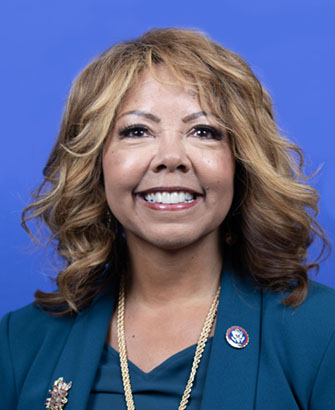

Nominee	Lucy McBath	Mark Gonsalves
Party	Democratic	Republican
Popular vote	143,063	91,262
Percentage	61.1%	38.9%
- McBath: 50–60% 60–70% 70–80% 80–90% Gonsalves: 50–60% 60–70% 70–80% Tie: 50% No votes
U.S. Representative before election
Lucy McBath (Democratic)
Carolyn Bourdeaux (Democratic)
Elected U.S. Representative
Lucy McBath
Democratic

The 7th district comprises suburbs and exurbs of Atlanta. The incumbent was Democrat Carolyn Bourdeaux, who had represented the district since 2021. She flipped the district and was elected with 51.4% of the vote in 2020. Bourdeaux ran for reelection, losing a primary challenge from the 6th district's Representative Lucy McBath, who opted to change districts after hers was redrawn during redistricting to heavily favor Republicans. McBath won the general election.

=== Democratic primary ===
==== Candidates ====
===== Nominee =====
- Lucy McBath, incumbent U.S. representative for the 6th district

===== Eliminated in primary =====
- Carolyn Bourdeaux, incumbent U.S representative
- Donna McLeod, state representative

==== Endorsements ====
Carolyn Bourdeaux

State legislators

- Gregg Kennard, state representative
- Dewey McClain, state representative and former professional football player
- Beth Moore, state representative

County officials

- Nicole Love Hendrickson, chair of Gwinnett County Board of Commissioners

Municipal officials

- Andrew Young, 55th mayor of Atlanta (1982–1990); 14th United States ambassador to the United Nations (1977–1979); former U.S. representative from GA-5 (1973–1977)

Organizations

- End Citizens United (dual endorsement of Bourdeaux and McBath)
- Let America Vote (dual endorsement of Bourdeaux and McBath)
- NARAL Pro-Choice America (dual endorsement of Bourdeaux and McBath)
- Planned Parenthood Action Fund (dual endorsement of Bourdeaux and McBath)
Lucy McBath

U.S. senators

- Elizabeth Warren, U.S. senator from Massachusetts (2013–present)

U.S. representatives

- Jim Clyburn, U.S. representative for SC-06 (1993–present); House majority whip (2019–present)
- Ayanna Pressley, U.S. representative for MA-07 (2019–present)

State legislators

- Karen Bennett, state representative

Organizations

- End Citizens United (dual endorsement of Bourdeaux and McBath)
- Everytown for Gun Safety
- Feminist Majority PAC
- Let America Vote (dual endorsement of Bourdeaux and McBath)
- NARAL Pro-Choice America (dual endorsement of Bourdeaux and McBath)
- Natural Resources Defense Council
- Patriotic Millionaires
- Planned Parenthood Action Fund (dual endorsement of Bourdeaux and McBath)
- Sierra Club

==== Polling ====
Poll source	Date(s) administered	Sample size	Margin of error	Carolyn Bourdeaux	Lucy McBath	Donna McLeod	Undecided
Data for Progress (D) (Note: Poll sponsored by Protect Our Future)	January 13–16, 2022	419 (LV)	± 5.0%	31%	40%	6%	22%
20/20 Insight (D) (Note: Poll sponsored by McBath's campaign)	December 10–15, 2021	333 (LV)	± 5.4%	19%	41%	4%	–

Runoff polling

Poll source	Date(s) administered	Sample size	Margin of error	Carolyn Bourdeaux	Lucy McBath	Undecided
20/20 Insight (D)	December 10–15, 2021	333 (LV)	± 5.4%	22%	45%	–

==== Results ====
Democratic primary results
Party	Candidate	Votes	%
Democratic	Lucy McBath (incumbent)	33,607	63.1
Democratic	Carolyn Bourdeaux (incumbent)	16,310	30.6
Democratic	Donna McLeod	3,352	6.3
Total votes		53,269	100.0

=== Republican primary ===
==== Candidates ====
===== Nominee =====
- Mark Gonsalves, businessman

===== Eliminated in runoff =====
- Michael Corbin, telecommunications network integration director

===== Eliminated in primary =====
- Lisa McCoy, college professor
- YG Nyghtstorm, security executive
- Mary West, business executive

===== Withdrawn =====
- Rich McCormick, physician and nominee for Georgia's 7th congressional district in 2020 (running in Georgia's 6th congressional district)
- Eugene Chin Yu (running in Georgia's 6th congressional district)

==== Endorsements ====
YG Nyghtstorm

Individuals

- Billy Davis, Arizona state senator

==== Results ====
Republican primary results
Party	Candidate	Votes	%
Republican	Michael Corbin	18,637	41.1
Republican	Mark Gonsalves	12,477	27.5
Republican	Lisa McCoy	6,380	14.1
Republican	Mary West	4,370	9.6
Republican	YG Nyghtstorm	3,510	7.7
Total votes		45,374	100.0

==== Primary runoff results ====
Republican primary runoff results
Party	Candidate	Votes	%
Republican	Mark Gonsalves	8,591	70.1
Republican	Michael Corbin	3,666	29.9
Total votes		12,257	100.0

=== General election ===
==== Predictions ====
Source	Ranking	As of
The Cook Political Report	Solid D	December 30, 2021
Inside Elections	Solid D	February 4, 2022
Sabato's Crystal Ball	Safe D	January 4, 2022
Politico	Solid D	April 5, 2022
RCP	Safe D	June 9, 2022
Fox News	Solid D	July 11, 2022
DDHQ	Solid D	July 20, 2022
538	Solid D	June 30, 2022
The Economist	Safe D	September 28, 2022

==== Results ====
Georgia's 7th congressional district, 2022
Party	Candidate	Votes	%
Democratic	Lucy McBath (incumbent)	143,063	61.1
Republican	Mark Gonsalves	91,262	38.9
Total votes		234,325	100.0
Democratic hold			

== District 8 ==
2022 Georgia's 8th congressional district election
- November 8, 2022
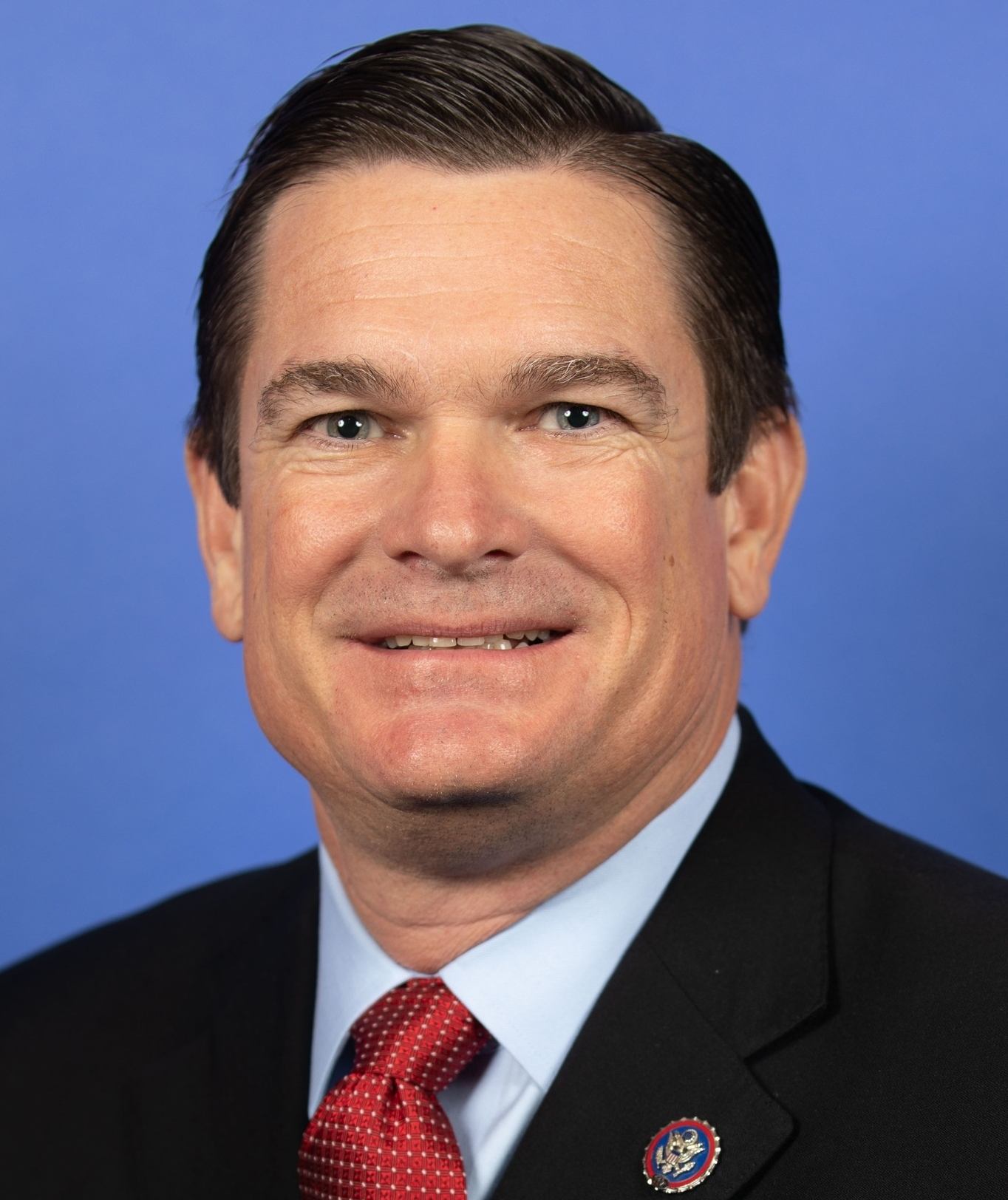

Nominee	Austin Scott	Darrius Butler
Party	Republican	Democratic
Popular vote	178,700	81,886
Percentage	68.58%	31.42%
- Scott: 50–60% 60–70% 70–80% 80–90% >90% Butler: 50–60% 60–70% 70–80% 80–90% >90%
U.S. Representative before election
Austin Scott
Republican
Elected U.S. Representative
Austin Scott
Republican

The 8th district comprises a large sliver of the southern part of the state. Incumbent Republican Austin Scott, who had represented the district since 2011, was re-elected with 64.5% of the vote in 2020. He declared his candidacy for re-election.

=== Republican primary ===
==== Candidates ====
===== Nominee =====
- Austin Scott, incumbent U.S. representative

===== Withdrawn =====
- Michael Reece

==== Results ====
Republican primary results
Party	Candidate	Votes	%
Republican	Austin Scott (incumbent)	90,426	100.0
Total votes		90,426	100.0

=== Democratic primary ===
==== Candidates ====
===== Nominee =====
- Darrius Butler, pastor

==== Results ====
Democratic primary results
Party	Candidate	Votes	%
Democratic	Darrius Butler	30,655	100.0
Total votes		30,655	100.0

=== Independent and third-party candidates ===
==== Libertarian party ====
===== Filed paperwork =====
- Mark Mosley

==== Green Party ====
===== Withdrawn =====
- Jimmy Cooper (running for state representative in district 145)

=== General election ===
==== Predictions ====
Source	Ranking	As of
The Cook Political Report	Solid R	December 30, 2021
Inside Elections	Solid R	February 4, 2022
Sabato's Crystal Ball	Safe R	January 4, 2022
Politico	Solid R	April 5, 2022
RCP	Safe R	June 9, 2022
Fox News	Solid R	July 11, 2022
DDHQ	Solid R	July 20, 2022
538	Solid R	June 30, 2022
The Economist	Safe R	September 28, 2022

==== Results ====
Georgia's 8th congressional district, 2022
Party	Candidate	Votes	%
Republican	Austin Scott (incumbent)	178,700	68.6
Democratic	Darrius Butler	81,886	31.4
Total votes		260,586	100.0
Republican hold			

== District 9 ==
2022 Georgia's 9th congressional district election
- November 8, 2022
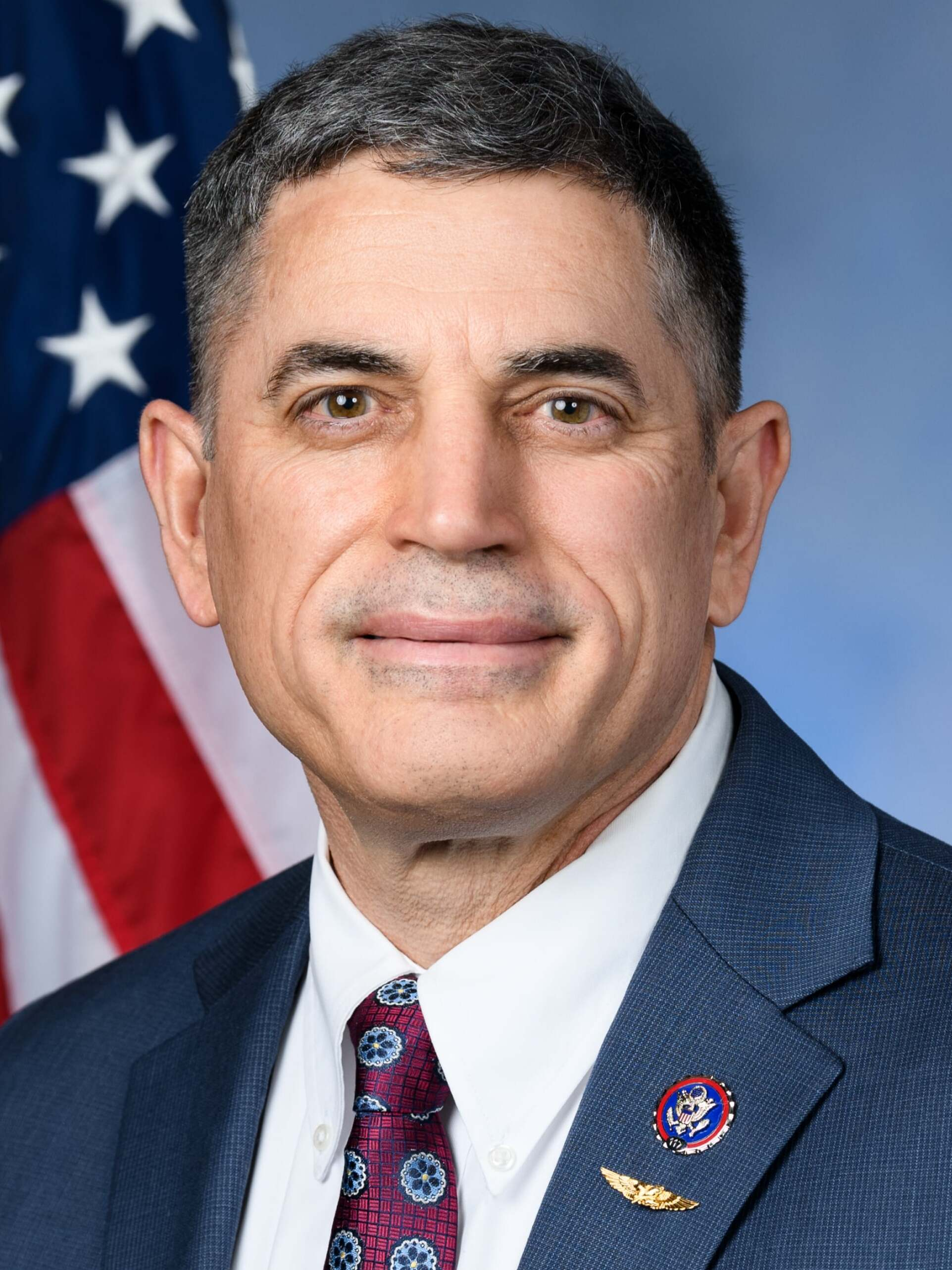

Nominee	Andrew Clyde	Michael Ford
Party	Republican	Democratic
Popular vote	212,820	81,318
Percentage	72.35%	27.65%
- Clyde: 50–60% 60–70% 70–80% 80–90% >90% Ford: 50–60% 60–70% 80–90%
U.S. Representative before election
Andrew Clyde
Republican
Elected U.S. Representative
Andrew Clyde
Republican

The 9th district encompasses the northeast part of the state. Incumbent Republican Andrew Clyde, who had represented the district since 2021 and was elected with 78.6% of the vote in 2020, ran for re-election.

=== Republican primary ===
==== Candidates ====
===== Nominee =====
- Andrew Clyde, incumbent U.S. representative

===== Eliminated in primary =====
- Michael Boggus, crane operator
- Gregory Howard, businessman
- John London, pastor
- Ben Souther, businessman and former FBI agent

==== Results ====
Republican primary results
Party	Candidate	Votes	%
Republican	Andrew Clyde (incumbent)	90,535	76.4
Republican	Ben Souther	17,922	15.1
Republican	Michael Boggus	4,230	3.6
Republican	Gregory Howard	3,463	2.9
Republican	John London	2,359	2.0
Total votes		118,509	100.0

=== Democratic primary ===
==== Candidates ====
===== Nominee =====
- Michael Ford, attorney and chair of the Hall County Democratic Party

==== Results ====
Democratic primary results
Party	Candidate	Votes	%
Democratic	Michael Ford	21,434	100.0
Total votes		21,434	100.0

=== General election ===
==== Predictions ====
Source	Ranking	As of
The Cook Political Report	Solid R	December 30, 2021
Inside Elections	Solid R	February 4, 2022
Sabato's Crystal Ball	Safe R	January 4, 2022
Politico	Solid R	April 5, 2022
RCP	Safe R	June 9, 2022
Fox News	Solid R	July 11, 2022
DDHQ	Solid R	July 20, 2022
538	Solid R	June 30, 2022
The Economist	Safe R	September 28, 2022

==== Results ====
Georgia's 9th congressional district, 2022
Party	Candidate	Votes	%
Republican	Andrew Clyde (incumbent)	212,820	72.4
Democratic	Michael Ford	81,318	27.6
Total votes		294,138	100.0
Republican hold			

== District 10 ==
2022 Georgia's 10th congressional district election
- November 8, 2022
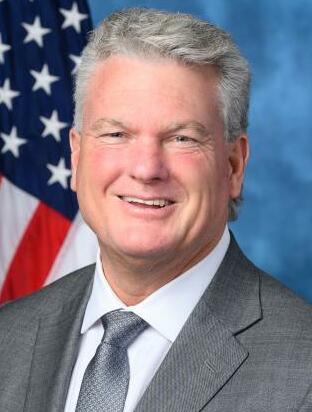

Nominee	Mike Collins	Tabitha Johnson-Green
Party	Republican	Democratic
Popular vote	198,523	109,107
Percentage	64.53%	35.47%
- Collins: 50–60% 60–70% 70–80% 80–90% >90% Johnson-Green: 50–60% 60–70% 70–80% 80–90%
U.S. Representative before election
Jody Hice
Republican
Elected U.S. Representative
Mike Collins
Republican

The 10th district encompasses a large portion of the central-east part of the state. Incumbent Republican Jody Hice, who had represented the district since 2015, was re-elected with 62.3% of the vote in 2020. Hice did not run for re-election, instead running in the 2022 Georgia secretary of state election.

=== Republican primary ===
==== Candidates ====
===== Nominee =====
- Mike Collins, trucking executive, son of former U.S. Representative Mac Collins, and candidate for this district in 2014

===== Eliminated in runoff =====
- Vernon Jones, former Democratic state representative (1993–2001, 2017–2021) and CEO of DeKalb County (2001–2009) (previously filed to run for governor)

===== Eliminated in primary =====
- Timothy Barr, state representative
- Paul Broun, physician and former U.S. representative
- David Curry, former state revenue commissioner
- Marc McMain, publisher
- Alan Sims, retired Air Force colonel
- Mitchell Swan, Marine Corps veteran

===== Withdrawn =====
- Andrew Alvey (endorsed Mitchell Swan)
- Todd Heussner, retired Army colonel
- Matt Richards, businessman (endorsed Mike Collins)
- Charles V. Rupert
- Patrick Witt, former Trump administration official (endorsed Vernon Jones, running for insurance commissioner)

===== Declined =====
- Jody Hice, incumbent U.S. representative (ran for secretary of state)

==== Endorsements ====
Timothy Barr

Federal officials

- Andrew Clyde, U.S. representative for GA-9 (2021–present)
- Jeff Duncan, U.S. representative for SC-3 (2011–present)
- Louie Gohmert, U.S. representative for TX-1 (2005–present)
- Bob Good, U.S. representative for VA-5 (2021–present)
- Jody Hice, U.S. representative for GA-10 (2015–2023)
- Ralph Norman, U.S. representative for SC-5 (2017–present)
- Scott Perry, U.S. representative for PA-4 (2019–present)

Organizations

- Stand for Health Freedom
Paul Broun

Governors

- Nathan Deal, former governor of Georgia (2011–2019)
Mike Collins

Federal officials

- ~~Michael Flynn, retired United States Army lieutenant general, 25th U.S. national security advisor~~ (withdrew endorsement, switched to Jones)

Governors

- Brian Kemp, governor of Georgia (2019–present)

Individuals

- Paul Broun, former US House representative from Georgia
- Wendy Rogers, Arizona state senator

Organizations

- Turning Point Action
Vernon Jones

Executive branch officials

- Donald Trump, 45th president of the United States (2017–2021)

Federal officials

- Michael Flynn, retired United States Army lieutenant general, 25th U.S. national security advisor
- Newt Gingrich, U.S. representative for Georgia's 6th congressional district (1973–1999) and 50th speaker of the House (1995–1999)
- Rudy Giuliani, former New York City mayor
- Bernard Kerik, consultant and former police officer
- Leo Terrell, civil rights attorney and talk radio host
- Patrick Witt, former Trump administration official, candidate for insurance commissioner

State officials

- Ralph Hudgens, former insurance commissioner of Georgia

Individuals

- Brigitte Gabriel, Lebanese-American conservative author
- Kimberly Klacik, businesswoman and politician
- CJ Pearson, conservative political activist and commentator

Organizations

- NRA Political Victory Fund
Patrick Witt (withdrew)

Federal officials

- Madison Cawthorn, U.S. representative for NC-11 (2021–present)

==== Polling ====
Poll source	Date(s) administered	Sample size	Margin of error	Timothy Barr	Paul Broun	Mike Collins	David Curry	Vernon Jones	Marc McMain	Mitchell Swan	Other	Undecided
The Trafalgar Group (R)	February 1–3, 2022	754 (LV)	± 3.6%	8%	11%	36%	9%	2%	7%	–	13%	16%
The Trafalgar Group (R)	February 1–3, 2022	754 (LV)	± 3.6%	8%	11%	36%	9%	–	7%	–	14%	16%
Fabrizio Lee (R)	January 2022	– (LV)	–	3%	8%	14%	5%	14%	3%	3%	3%	47%

==== Results ====
Results by county: Collins: 20–30%; 30–40%; 40–50%; 60–70%; Jones: 20–30%; 30–40%; Broun: 20–30%; 30–40%; Curry: 30–40%

Republican primary results
Party	Candidate	Votes	%
Republican	Mike Collins	28,741	25.6
Republican	Vernon Jones	24,165	21.5
Republican	Timothy Barr	16,007	14.3
Republican	Paul Broun	14,901	13.3
Republican	David Curry	10,557	9.4
Republican	Alan Sims	7,388	6.6
Republican	Marc McMain	5,222	4.7
Republican	Mitchell Swan	5,184	4.6
Total votes		112,165	100.0

==== Runoff debate ====
2022 Georgia's 10th congressional district Republican primary runoff debate
No.	Date	Host	Moderator	Link	Republican	Republican
Key: P Participant A Absent N Not invited I Invited W Withdrawn						
Key: P Participant A Absent N Not invited I Invited W Withdrawn					Mike Collins	Vernon Jones
1	Jun. 6, 2022	Atlanta Press Club	Donna Lowry		P	P

==== Primary runoff results ====
Results by county: Collins: 50–60%; 60–70%; 70–80%; 80–90%

Republican primary runoff results
Party	Candidate	Votes	%
Republican	Mike Collins	30,536	74.5
Republican	Vernon Jones	10,469	25.5
Total votes		41,005	100.0

=== Democratic primary ===
==== Candidates ====
===== Nominee =====
- Tabitha Johnson-Green, registered nurse and nominee for Georgia's 10th congressional district in 2018 and 2020

===== Eliminated in runoff =====
- Jessica Fore, activist for victims of domestic violence

===== Eliminated in primary =====
- Phyllis Hatcher, pastor and businesswoman
- Femi Oduwole, software engineer
- Paul Walton, mayor of Hull

==== Results ====
Democratic primary results
Party	Candidate	Votes	%
Democratic	Tabitha Johnson-Green	15,821	42.0
Democratic	Jessica Fore	7,257	19.2
Democratic	Phyllis Hatcher	7,120	18.9
Democratic	Femi Oduwole	4,427	11.7
Democratic	Paul Walton	3,077	8.2
Total votes		37,702	100.0

==== Primary runoff results ====
Democratic primary runoff results
Party	Candidate	Votes	%
Democratic	Tabitha Johnson-Green	9,070	64.4
Democratic	Jessica Fore	5,024	35.6
Total votes		14,094	100.0

=== General election ===
==== Predictions ====
Source	Ranking	As of
The Cook Political Report	Solid R	December 30, 2021
Inside Elections	Solid R	February 4, 2022
Sabato's Crystal Ball	Safe R	January 4, 2022
Politico	Solid R	April 5, 2022
RCP	Safe R	June 9, 2022
Fox News	Solid R	July 11, 2022
DDHQ	Solid R	July 20, 2022
538	Solid R	June 30, 2022
The Economist	Safe R	September 28, 2022

==== Results ====
Georgia's 10th congressional district, 2022
Party	Candidate	Votes	%
Republican	Mike Collins	198,523	64.5
Democratic	Tabitha Johnson-Green	109,107	35.5
Total votes		307,630	100.0
Republican hold			

== District 11 ==
2022 Georgia's 11th congressional district election
- November 8, 2022
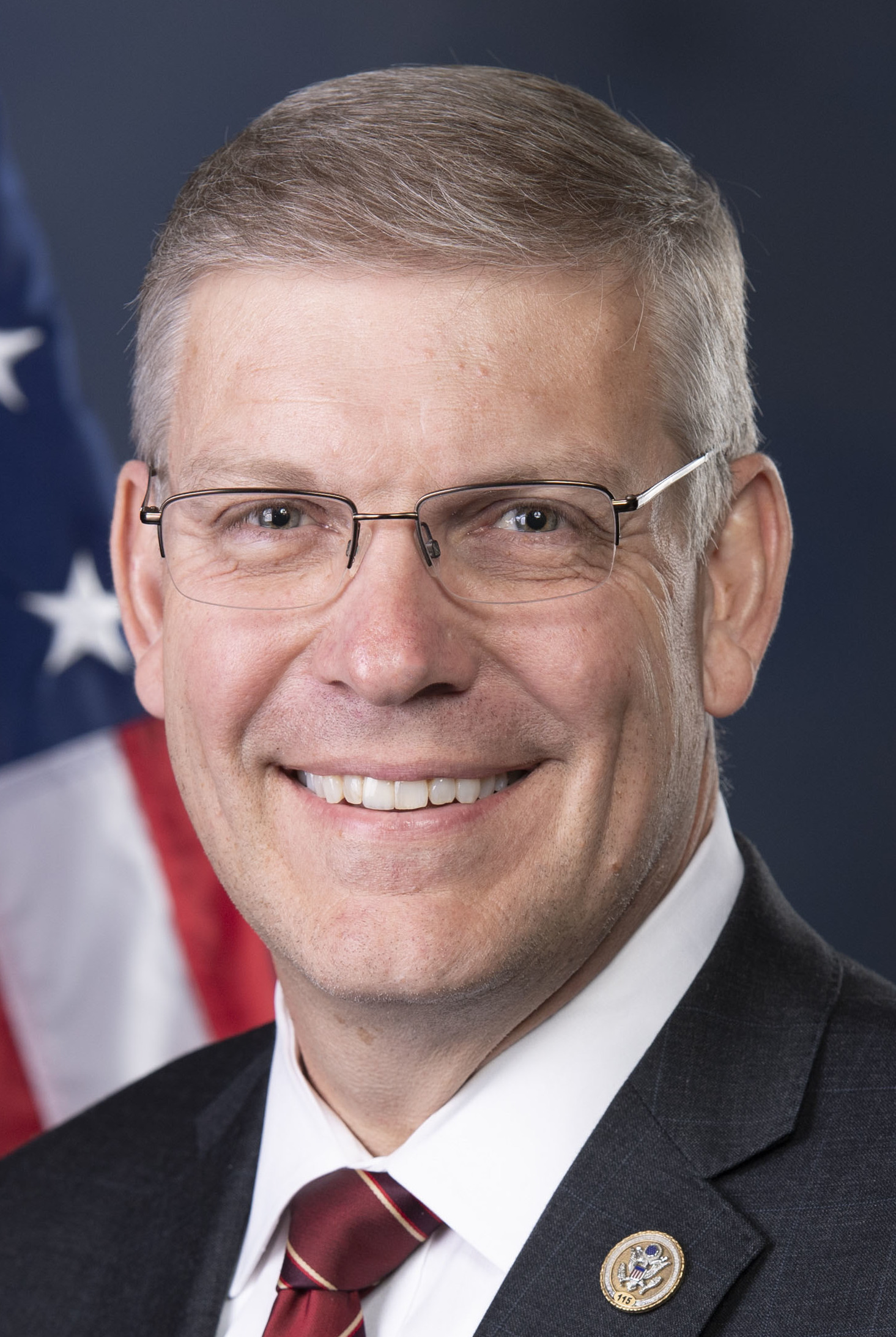

Nominee	Barry Loudermilk	Antonio Daza-Fernandez
Party	Republican	Democratic
Popular vote	190,086	113,571
Percentage	62.60%	37.40%
- Loudermilk: 50–60% 60–70% 70–80% 80–90% >90% Daza-Fernandez: 50–60% 60–70% 70–80% 80–90%
U.S. Representative before election
Barry Loudermilk
Republican
Elected U.S. Representative
Barry Loudermilk
Republican

The 11th district is based in the northern exurbs of Atlanta. Incumbent Republican Barry Loudermilk, who had represented the district since 2015 and was re-elected with 60.4% of the vote in 2020, announced he was running for re-election.

=== Republican primary ===
==== Candidates ====
===== Nominee =====
- Barry Loudermilk, incumbent U.S. representative

==== Results ====
Republican primary results
Party	Candidate	Votes	%
Republican	Barry Loudermilk (incumbent)	99,073	100.0
Total votes		99,073	100.0

=== Democratic primary ===
==== Candidates ====
===== Nominee =====
- Antonio Daza-Fernandez, business owner

==== Results ====
Democratic primary results
Party	Candidate	Votes	%
Democratic	Antonio Daza-Fernandez	33,470	100.0
Total votes		33,470	100.0

=== Independent and third-party candidates ===
==== Independents ====
===== Filed paperwork =====
- Angela Grace Davis

=== General election ===
==== Predictions ====
Source	Ranking	As of
The Cook Political Report	Solid R	December 30, 2021
Inside Elections	Solid R	February 4, 2022
Sabato's Crystal Ball	Safe R	January 4, 2022
Politico	Solid R	April 5, 2022
RCP	Safe R	June 9, 2022
Fox News	Solid R	July 11, 2022
DDHQ	Solid R	July 20, 2022
538	Solid R	June 30, 2022
The Economist	Safe R	September 28, 2022

==== Results ====
Georgia's 11th congressional district, 2022
Party	Candidate	Votes	%
Republican	Barry Loudermilk (incumbent)	190,086	62.6
Democratic	Antonio Daza-Fernandez	113,571	37.4
Total votes		303,657	100.0
Republican hold			

== District 12 ==
2022 Georgia's 12th congressional district election
- November 8, 2022
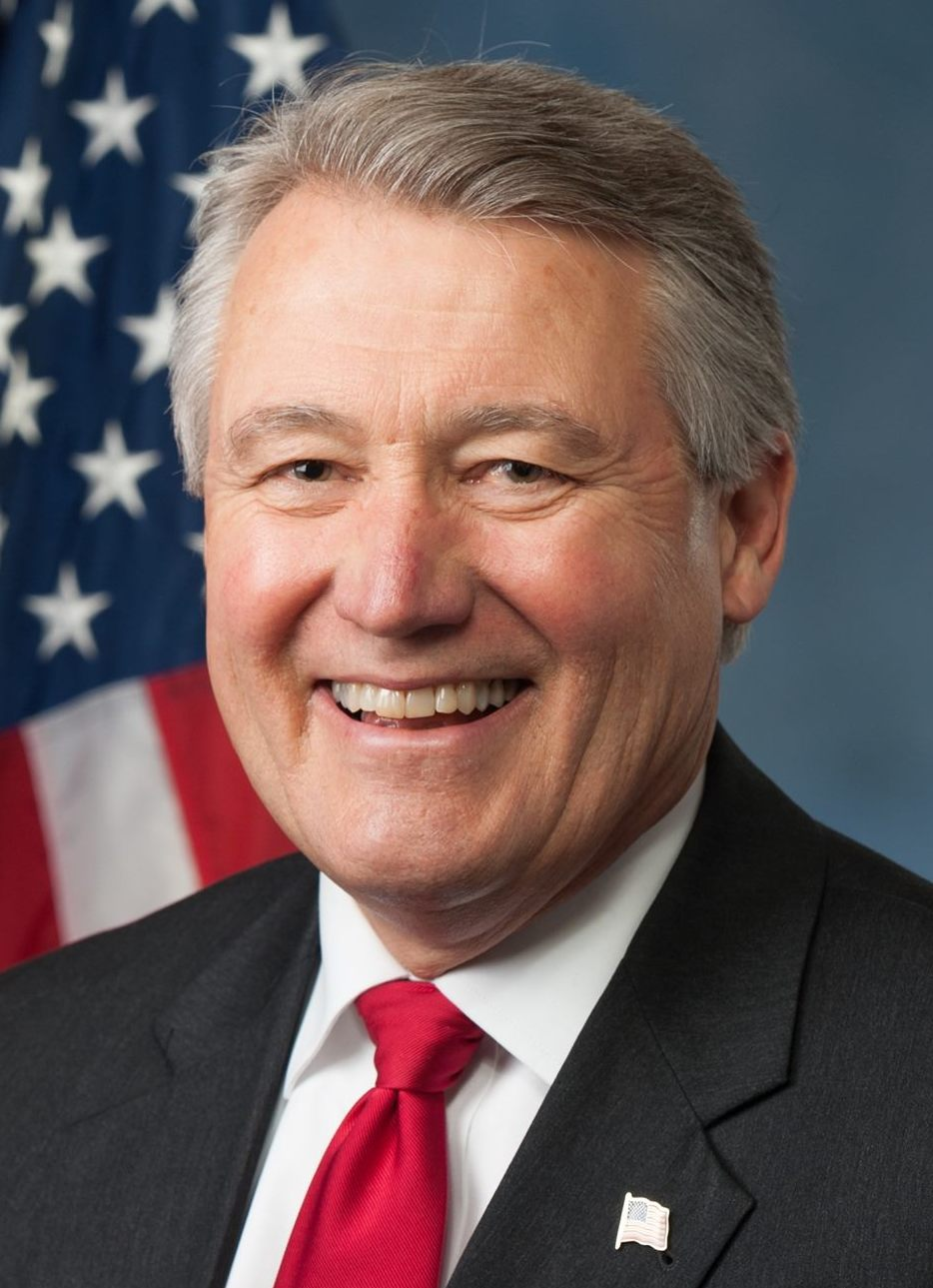

Nominee	Rick Allen	Elizabeth Johnson
Party	Republican	Democratic
Popular vote	158,047	107,148
Percentage	59.60%	40.40%
- Allen: 50–60% 60–70% 70–80% 80–90% >90% Johnson: 50–60% 60–70% 70–80% 80–90% >90%
U.S. Representative before election
Rick Allen
Republican
Elected U.S. Representative
Rick Allen
Republican

The 12th district is based in the central-east part of the state, surrounding Augusta. Incumbent Republican Rick Allen, who had represented the district since 2015, was re-elected with 58.4% of the vote in 2020. He ran for re-election.

=== Republican primary ===
==== Candidates ====
===== Nominee =====
- Rick Allen, incumbent U.S. representative

==== Results ====
Republican primary results
Party	Candidate	Votes	%
Republican	Rick Allen (incumbent)	81,151	100.0
Total votes		81,151	100.0

=== Democratic primary ===
==== Candidates ====
===== Nominee =====
- Elizabeth Johnson, retired insurance professional and nominee for insurance and safety fire commissioner in 2014 and Georgia's 12th congressional district in 2020

==== Results ====
Democratic primary results
Party	Candidate	Votes	%
Democratic	Elizabeth Johnson	44,537	100.0
Total votes		44,537	100.0

=== General election ===
==== Predictions ====
Source	Ranking	As of
The Cook Political Report	Solid R	December 30, 2021
Inside Elections	Solid R	February 4, 2022
Sabato's Crystal Ball	Safe R	January 4, 2022
Politico	Solid R	November 7, 2022
RCP	Safe R	June 9, 2022
Fox News	Solid R	July 11, 2022
DDHQ	Solid R	July 20, 2022
538	Solid R	June 30, 2022
The Economist	Safe R	September 28, 2022

==== Results ====
Georgia's 12th congressional district, 2022
Party	Candidate	Votes	%
Republican	Rick Allen (incumbent)	158,047	59.6
Democratic	Elizabeth Johnson	107,148	40.4
Total votes		265,195	100.0
Republican hold			

== District 13 ==
2022 Georgia's 13th congressional district election
- November 8, 2022
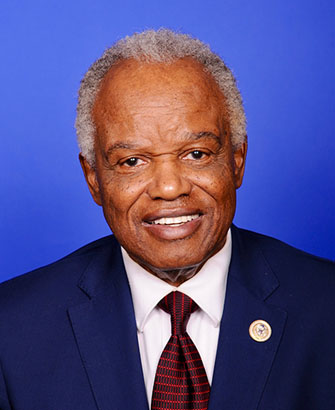

Nominee	David Scott	Caesar Gonzales
Party	Democratic	Republican
Popular vote	216,388	48,228
Percentage	81.78%	18.22%
- Scott: 50–60% 60–70% 70–80% 80–90% >90% Gonzales: 50–60% 60–70% 70–80% No votes
U.S. Representative before election
David Scott
Democratic
Elected U.S. Representative
David Scott
Democratic

The 13th district is based in the southwest suburbs and exurbs of Atlanta. Incumbent Democrat David Scott, who had represented the district since 2003, was re-elected with 77.4% of the vote in 2020. He ran for re-election.

=== Democratic primary ===
==== Candidates ====
===== Nominee =====
- David Scott, incumbent U.S. representative

===== Eliminated in primary =====
- Mark Baker, member of the South Fulton City Council
- Shastity Driscoll, consultant
- Vincent Fort, former state senator (1996–2017) and candidate for mayor of Atlanta in 2017

===== Withdrawn =====
- Antonio Darnell Gray

==== Endorsements ====
David Scott

Organizations

- Planned Parenthood Action Fund
Vincent Fort

U.S. senators

- Bernie Sanders, U.S. senator from Vermont (2007–present)

Organizations

- Our Revolution
- Progressive Democrats of America

==== Results ====
Democratic primary results
Party	Candidate	Votes	%
Democratic	David Scott (incumbent)	60,544	65.7
Democratic	Mark Baker	11,581	12.6
Democratic	Shastity Driscoll	10,906	11.8
Democratic	Vincent Fort	9,108	9.9
Total votes		92,139	100.0

=== Republican primary ===
==== Candidates ====
===== Nominee =====
- Caesar Gonzales, aerospace engineer and candidate for this seat in 2020

===== Eliminated in primary =====
- Dominika Hawkins, consultant
- Calina Plotky, attorney

==== Results ====
Republican primary results
Party	Candidate	Votes	%
Republican	Caesar Gonzales	12,659	57.2
Republican	Calina Plotky	5,022	22.7
Republican	Dominika Hawkins	4,450	20.1
Total votes		22,131	100.0

=== Independent and third-party candidates ===
==== Libertarian Party ====
===== Filed paperwork =====
- Martin Lindsey Cowen III

=== General election ===
==== Predictions ====
Source	Ranking	As of
The Cook Political Report	Solid D	December 30, 2021
Inside Elections	Solid D	February 4, 2022
Sabato's Crystal Ball	Safe D	January 4, 2022
Politico	Solid D	April 5, 2022
RCP	Safe D	June 9, 2022
Fox News	Solid D	July 11, 2022
DDHQ	Solid D	July 20, 2022
538	Solid D	June 30, 2022
The Economist	Safe D	September 28, 2022

==== Results ====
Georgia's 13th congressional district, 2022
Party	Candidate	Votes	%
Democratic	David Scott (incumbent)	216,388	81.8
Republican	Caesar Gonzales	48,228	18.2
Total votes		264,616	100.0
Democratic hold			

== District 14 ==
2022 Georgia's 14th congressional district election
- November 8, 2022
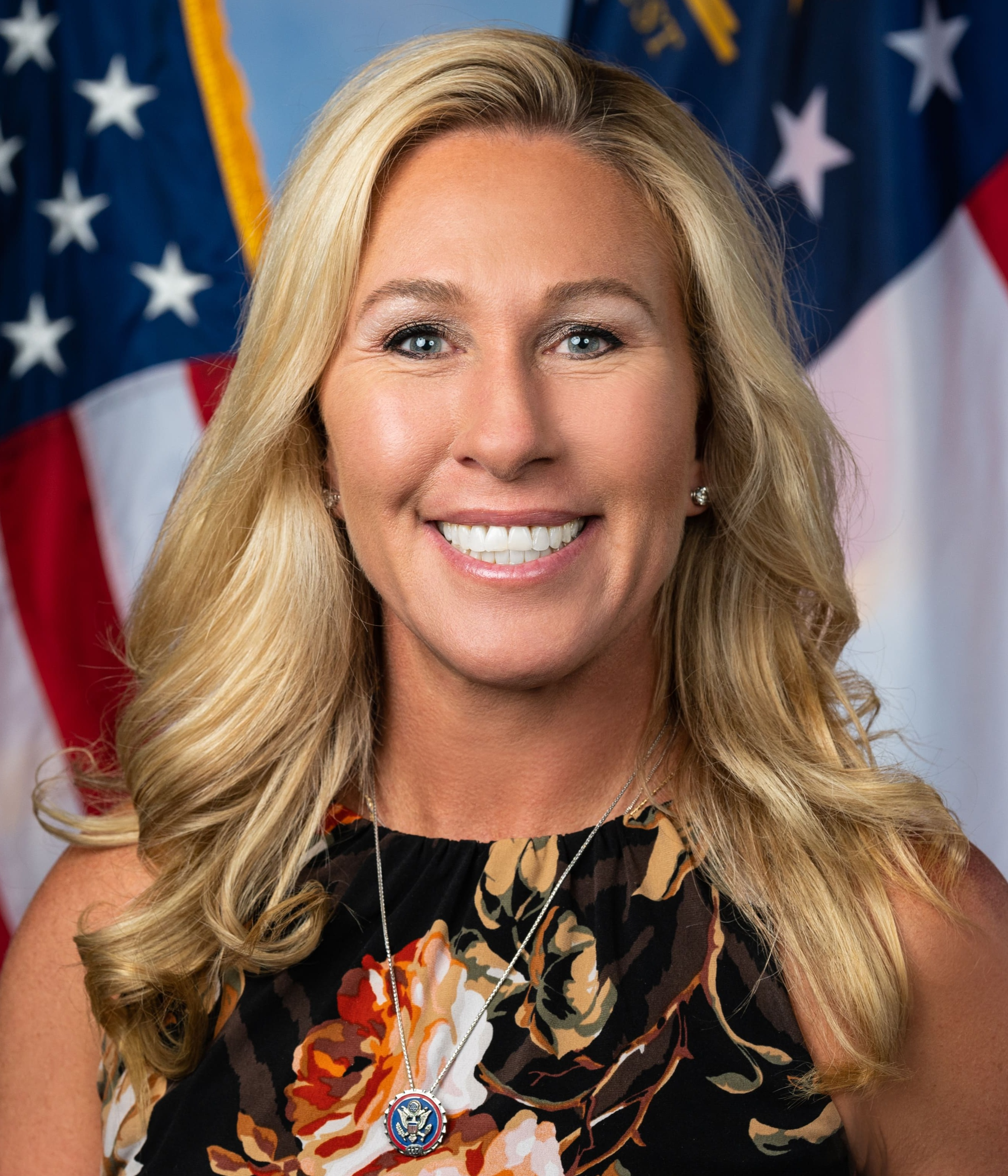

Nominee	Marjorie Taylor Greene	Marcus Flowers
Party	Republican	Democratic
Popular vote	170,162	88,189
Percentage	65.86%	34.14%
- Greene: 50–60% 60–70% 70–80% 80–90% >90% Flowers: 50–60% 60–70% 70–80% 80–90%
U.S. Representative before election
Marjorie Taylor Greene
Republican
Elected U.S. Representative
Marjorie Taylor Greene
Republican

The 14th district is based in the northwest corner of the state. Incumbent Republican Marjorie Taylor Greene, who had represented the district since 2021, was elected with 74.7% of the vote in 2020. Greene ran for re-election after winning a legal challenge to her eligibility based on her alleged involvement in organizing and promoting the 2021 United States Capitol attack, based on the Fourteenth Amendment to the United States Constitution, which bars people who have engaged in insurrection from serving in Congress.

Although the election was regarded as uncompetitive by forecasters, Flowers notably achieved the highest fundraising total for a first time candidate in the 2022 cycle with roughly $16.6 million.

=== Republican primary ===
==== Candidates ====
===== Nominee =====
- Marjorie Taylor Greene, incumbent U.S. representative

===== Eliminated in primary =====
- Eric Cunningham, sales executive
- James Haygood, farmer
- Charles Lutin, physician and veteran
- Jennifer Strahan, CEO of J. Osley & Co.
- Seth Synstelien, educator

===== Withdrawn =====
- Mark Daniel Clay

==== Polling ====
Poll source	Date(s) administered	Sample size	Margin of error	Marjorie Taylor Greene	Charles Lutin	Jennifer Strahan	Undecided
TargetPoint Consulting (R)	January 13–17, 2022	450 (LV)	± 4.6%	60%	–	30%	10%
Neighborhood Research and Media (R) (Note: Poll sponsored by Greene's campaign)	December 13–22, 2021	388 (LV)	± 5.0%	71%	1%	0%	28%

==== Endorsements ====
Marjorie Taylor Greene

Federal officials

- Donald Trump, 45th president of the United States
Jennifer Strahan

Federal officials

- Bill Cassidy, U.S. senator from Louisiana (2015–present)
- Barbara Comstock, U.S. representative for VA-10 (2015–2019)
- Don Nickles, former U.S. senator from Oklahoma (1981–2005)

Organizations

- Associated General Contractors of America PAC
- Business-Industry PAC
- Republican Jewish Coalition PAC
- VIEW PAC

Publications

- National Review

Individuals

- Jeffrey Forbes, lobbyist

==== Results ====
Republican primary results
Party	Candidate	Votes	%
Republican	Marjorie Taylor Greene (incumbent)	72,215	69.5
Republican	Jennifer Strahan	17,595	16.9
Republican	Eric Cunningham	6,390	6.2
Republican	James Haygood	3,790	3.7
Republican	Charles Lutin	2,304	2.2
Republican	Seth Synstelien	1,547	1.5
Total votes		103,841	100.0

=== Democratic primary ===
==== Candidates ====
===== Nominee =====
- Marcus Flowers, account manager

===== Eliminated in primary =====
- Wendy Davis, Rome city commissioner
- Holly McCormack, insurance agent

==== Withdrawn ====
- Lateefah Conner (endorsed Davis)

==== Endorsements ====
Marcus Flowers

Federal officials

- Max Cleland, former U.S. senator from Georgia (1997–2003)
- Eric Swalwell, U.S. representative for CA-15 (2013–present)
- Andrew Young, 55th mayor of Atlanta (1982–1990); 14th United States ambassador to the United Nations (1977–1979); former U.S. representative from GA-5 (1973–1977)

State legislators

- Jen Jordan, Georgia state senator

Organizations

- The Collective PAC
- Congressional Black Caucus PAC
- No Dem Left Behind
- VoteVets.org
Wendy Davis

State legislators

- Billy Mitchell, Georgia state representative
- Nan Orrock, Georgia state senator
- Elena Parent, Georgia state senator
- David Wilkerson, Georgia state representative

Individuals

- Lateefah Connor, withdrawn candidate

==== Results ====
Democratic primary results
Party	Candidate	Votes	%
Democratic	Marcus Flowers	20,082	74.7
Democratic	Wendy Davis	5,141	19.1
Democratic	Holly McCormack	1,662	6.2
Total votes		26,885	100.0

=== Independent and third-party candidates ===
==== Libertarian Party ====
===== Filed paperwork =====
- Angela Pence

=== Debate ===
2022 Georgia's 14th congressional district debate
No.	Date	Host	Moderator	Link	Republican	Democratic
Key: P Participant A Absent N Not invited I Invited W Withdrawn						
Key: P Participant A Absent N Not invited I Invited W Withdrawn					Marjorie Taylor Greene	Marcus Flowers
1	Oct. 18, 2022	Atlanta Press; Club	John Druckenmiller; Josh Roe		P	P

==== Predictions ====
Source	Ranking	As of
The Cook Political Report	Solid R	December 30, 2021
Inside Elections	Solid R	February 4, 2022
Sabato's Crystal Ball	Safe R	January 4, 2022
Politico	Solid R	April 5, 2022
RCP	Safe R	June 9, 2022
Fox News	Solid R	July 11, 2022
DDHQ	Solid R	July 20, 2022
538	Solid R	June 30, 2022
The Economist	Safe R	September 28, 2022

==== Results ====
Georgia's 14th congressional district, 2022
Party	Candidate	Votes	%
Republican	Marjorie Taylor Greene (incumbent)	170,162	65.9
Democratic	Marcus Flowers	88,189	34.1
Total votes		258,351	100.0
Republican hold			

== Notes ==
Partisan clients
