= Taylor Bennett =

Taylor Bennett may refer to:

- Taylor Bennett (American football) (born 1985), American football quarterback and politician
- Taylor Bennett (rapper) (born 1996), American rapper
