= Matthew Wilson (politician) =

American politician (born 1984)

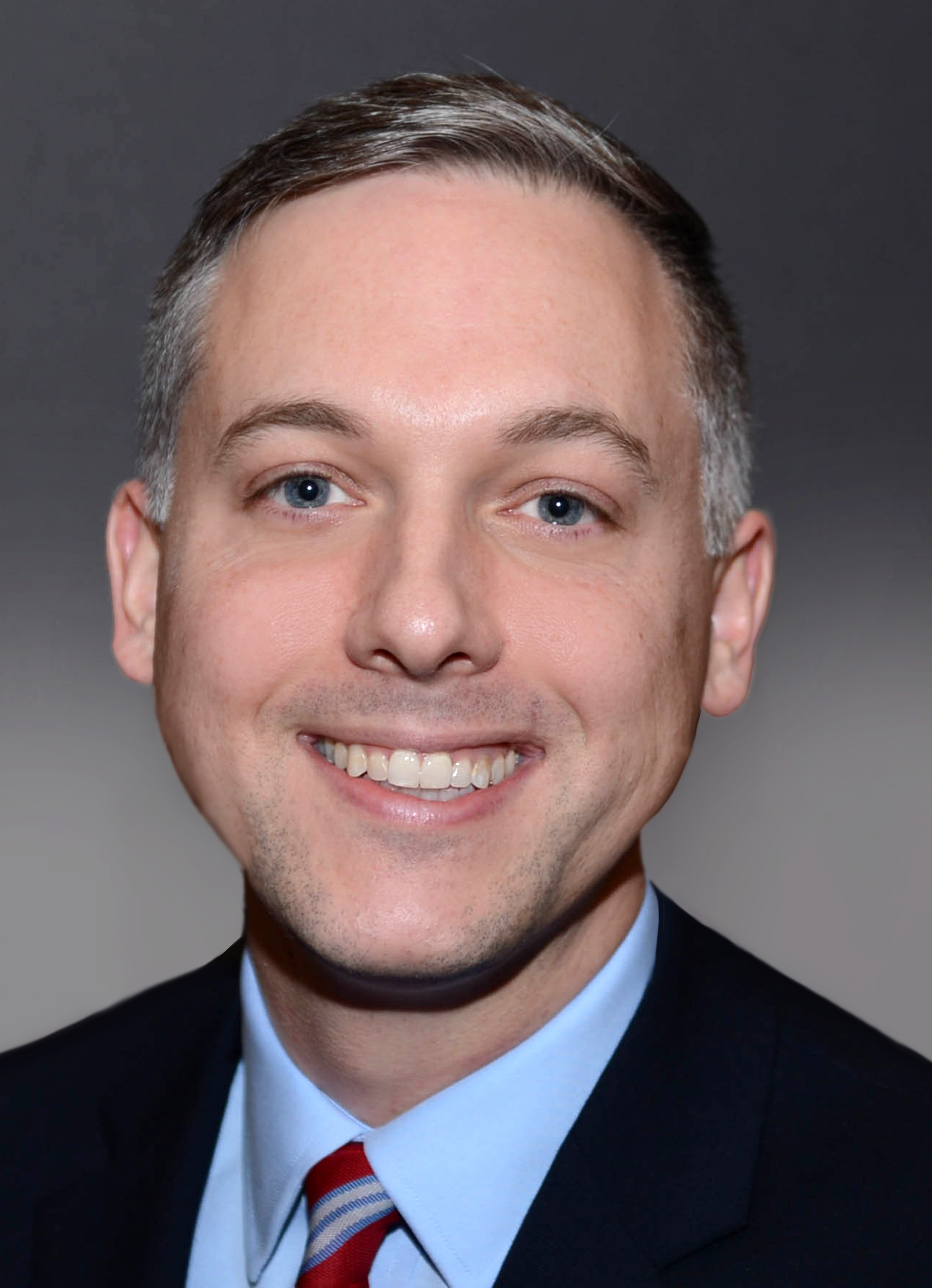
- Official portrait, 2014

Chair of the Georgia Democratic Party
- Acting
- In office March 31, 2025 – May 3, 2025
- Preceded by: Nikema Williams
- Succeeded by: Charlie Bailey

Member of the Georgia House of Representatives from the 80th district
- In office January 14, 2019 – January 9, 2023
- Preceded by: Meagan Hanson
- Succeeded by: Shea Roberts (redistricted)

Personal details
- Born: Walter Matthew Wilson; January 11, 1984 (age 42) Griffin, Georgia, U.S.
- Party: Democratic
- Education: University of Georgia (BS, JD)
- Website: Campaign website; State House website

Walter Matthew Wilson (born January 11, 1984) is an American politician and lawyer from Brookhaven, Georgia who served as the Georgia State Representative for the 80th district. A member of the Democratic Party, he defeated Republican incumbent Meagan Hanson in November 2018. Wilson is only the second openly gay man to be elected to the Georgia legislature.

Wilson ran in the 2022 Democratic primary for Georgia's Insurance and Fire commissioner, losing to Janice Laws Robinson in a runoff. He was one of two openly LGBT primary candidates in the 2022 Democratic primaries for state executive office, alongside Renitta Shannon who ran for Lieutenant Governor. He was succeeded in the House by Long Tran.

== Early life and education ==
Wilson and his twin sister were raised in Griffin, Georgia. He holds a Bachelor's degree and a Juris Doctor from University of Georgia.

Following graduation from college, he participated in the national Teach For America program, teaching sixth-grade math and science at a low-income, inner-city school in Houston, Texas.

Wilson is a partner with the law firm of Akin & Tate, where he is a general practice litigator.

== Political career ==
Wilson had his first political experience working as a staffer on the 2010 gubernatorial campaign of former Georgia Governor Roy Barnes. He also served briefly as the legislative director for the State Bar of Georgia.

He was elected to the Georgia House of Representatives in 2018 after defeating Republican incumbent Meagan Hanson. Sean Meloy of LGBTQ Victory Fund described District 80 as "one of the most competitive in the entire state." President Barack Obama endorsed Wilson.

Wilson was re-elected to a second term in the state house on November 3, 2020, defeating Republican challenger Alan Cole.

== Electoral history ==
=== 2018 ===
Georgia House of Representatives, 80th District - November 6, 2018
| Party | Candidate | Votes | % |
|---|---|---|---|
| Democratic | Matthew Wilson | 12,578 | 52.48% |
| Republican | Meagan Hanson (Incumbent) | 11,389 | 47.52% |
| Total votes | | 23,973 | 100.0% |
| Democratic gain from Republican | | | |

=== 2020 ===
<meta />

Georgia House of Representatives, 80th District - November 3, 2020
| Party | Candidate | Votes | % |
|---|---|---|---|
| Democratic | Matthew Wilson (Incumbent) | 17,347 | 58.8% |
| Republican | Alan Cole | 12,173 | 41.2% |
| Total votes | | 29,520 | 100.0% |
| Democratic hold | | | |

Party political offices
| Preceded by Nikema Williams | Chair of the Georgia Democratic Party; Acting; 2025 | Succeeded by Charlie Bailey |
