= Charlie Bailey (politician) =

American lawyer and politician (born 1983)

Chair of the Georgia Democratic Party
- Incumbent
- Assumed office May 3, 2025
- Preceded by: Matthew Wilson (acting)

Personal details
- Born: Charles Curtis Bailey; February 19, 1983 (age 43) Harris County, Georgia, U.S.
- Party: Democratic
- Spouse: Pallavi Purkayastha (m. 2023)
- Education: University of Georgia (BA, JD)

Charles Curtis Bailey (born February 19, 1983) is an American lawyer and politician from the state of Georgia. Since 2025, Bailey has served as Chair of the Democratic Party of Georgia. He was previously the Democratic nominee for both the 2018 Georgia Attorney General election and the 2022 Georgia lieutenant gubernatorial election.

== Biography ==
Bailey was born on his family's cattle farm in Harris County, Georgia. He attended the University of Georgia where he received undergraduate degrees in political science and religion. After graduation, Bailey worked as political director on Lt. Governor Mark Taylor's race against Sonny Perdue in the 2006 Georgia gubernatorial election. He then served as campaign director for James Marlow during the 2007 special election for the 10th congressional district. He then attended and graduated from the University of Georgia Law School.

In 2010, following law school, Bailey worked as an associate at the Barnes Law Group, founded by former Georgia Governor Roy Barnes. In 2014, he became a senior assistant district attorney in the Fulton County District Attorney's office.

In 2019, Bailey joined the law firm Cook & Connelly and opened the firm's Atlanta office.

== Campaigns ==
=== 2018 Attorney General election ===
In 2018, Bailey ran as the Democratic nominee for Attorney General of Georgia against incumbent Republican Chris Carr who was appointed to the position in 2016. In the race Bailey was drastically outspent by Carr. The final totals saw Carr gain 51.3 percent of the vote and Bailey 48.7 percent. This percentage was the highest vote share of any state-wide Georgia Democrat in 2018 behind gubernatorial candidate Stacey Abrams. He received 48.7% of the vote against Carr, which was the highest percentage for any down-ballot Democratic candidate in that cycle.

=== 2022 Lieutenant Governor election ===
In January 2021, Bailey began a run for Attorney General of Georgia as a rematch against Chris Carr. In January 2022, Bailey announced his plans to switch from the Attorney General race to the race for Lieutenant Governor with the encouragement of leaders in the Georgia Democratic Party. In his first three weeks Bailey's campaign for Lieutenant Governor raised $527,000. He has received endorsements from Lucy McBath, Roy Barnes, Shirley Franklin, and Dubose Porter. Bailey placed second in the May 2022 Democratic primary, and was endorsed by Stacey Abrams. The only candidate to show up for a pre-runoff debate in Atlanta, Bailey won the runoff election in June 2022, approaching a 2–1 vote advantage, and became the party's nominee for the general election in November. Bailey received 46.43% of the vote against Republican nominee and winner Burt Jones, the second-highest share for any down-ballot Democratic candidate in that cycle (after Jen Jordan, the nominee for Attorney General, who received 46.60% against Carr).

=== 2025 DPG Chair election ===
Following the resignation of Nikema Williams as chair of the Democratic Party of Georgia, Bailey announced his run for the position. He led in the first round of voting against five other candidates by the party's State Committee, and won the second round against DNC member Wendy Davis. Bailey became the first full-time, salaried Chair of the DPG since Jane Kidd.

== Personal life ==
Bailey is married to Pallavi Purkayastha. He currently resides in Atlanta.

Party political offices
Preceded by Sarah Riggs Amico	Democratic nominee for Lieutenant Governor of Georgia; 2022	Succeeded by Josh McLaurin
Preceded by Matthew Wilson; Acting	Chair of the Georgia Democratic Party; 2025–present	Incumbent
