= Nicole Love Hendrickson =

American politician (born 1979)

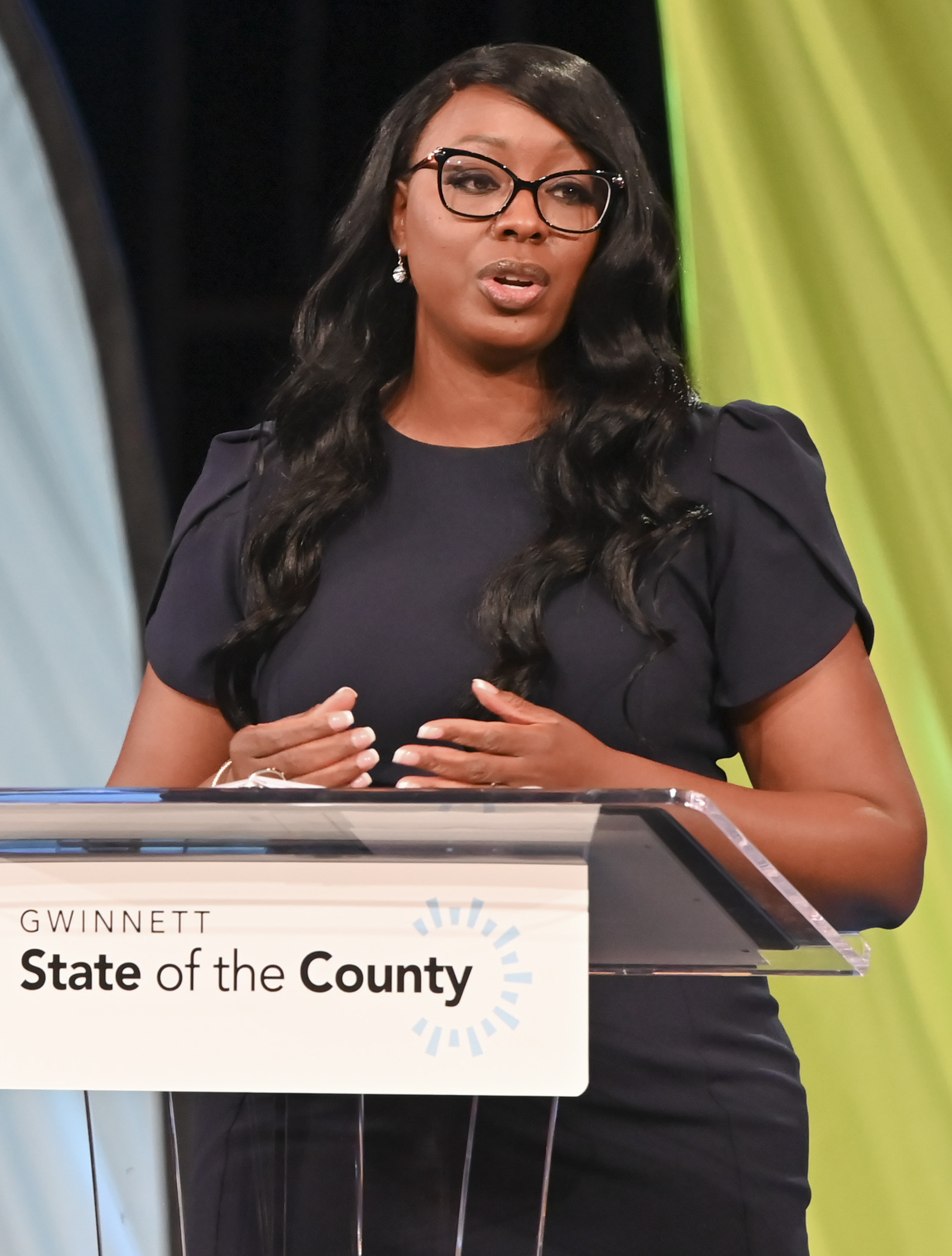
- 2021 State of the County Address

Chair of Gwinnett County Board of Commissioners
- Incumbent
- Assumed office January 1, 2021
- Preceded by: Charlotte Nash

Personal details
- Born: November 30, 1979 (age 46) Providence, Rhode Island
- Party: Democratic
- Spouse: Keverne Hendrickson
- Children: Kaden Hendrickson
- Education: University of Rhode Island (BA) University of Georgia (MSW)

Nicole Love Hendrickson is an American elected official serving as the chair of the Gwinnett County Board of Commissioners. She is the only full-time and at-large commissioner in the county. Hendrickson is the first African-American and person of color, and the third woman, to serve as the county's chair.

== Early life and education ==
Hendrickson was born and raised in Providence, Rhode Island. She graduated from the University of Rhode Island with a bachelor's degree in psychology. She moved to Georgia in the mid-2000s to pursue graduate studies. She earned a Master's of Social Work from the University of Georgia in 2007, specializing in community & non-profit planning.

== Career ==
Prior to her role with County Government, Hendrickson served as the Associate Director for the Gwinnett Coalition for Health and Human Services for 8 years. During this time, she spearheaded the Gwinnett Neighborhood Leadership Institute, a leadership training program that now has hundreds of alumni. In 2015, the Gwinnett County Board of Commissioners appointed Hendrickson as the county's first Community Outreach Program Director. In this role, Hendrickson founded numerous community engagement and civic education programs including the Gwinnett 101 Citizens Academy and the Gwinnett Youth Commission. In that capacity, Hendrickson spearheaded the Gwinnett Neighborhood Leadership Institute and led the annual Gwinnett Great Days of Service

== Gwinnett County Chairwoman ==
=== Campaign and election ===
In January 2020, Hendrickson announced her candidacy for the Gwinnett County Board of Commissioners chairmanship saying, "I am uniquely qualified for this position because I have the proven experience in local government and understand the tough decisions that have to be made in order to balance the needs of the community with being a steward of our tax dollars....But most importantly, I have the heart to serve.” Running as a Democrat, Hendrickson competed against four other primary candidates for the party's nomination. After coming in first place in the June primary, Hendrickson won the Democratic nomination in an August primary runoff with nearly 80% of the vote. In the general election, Hendrickson won against the Republican candidate with 58% of the vote.

In 2024, Hendrickson won her re-election bid.

=== Tenure ===
During her tenure as Chairwoman of the Gwinnett County Board of Commissioners, Nicole Love Hendrickson has overseen several major initiatives focused on economic development, housing affordability, transit investment, and community revitalization.

During her swearing-in ceremony in January 2021, Hendrickson stated: “My promise to you is that we will work to make Gwinnett County a community where economic opportunity is abundant for everyone, a community where affordability isn’t a luxury, and a community that leads in regional connectivity. I am grateful to be a partner in addressing the challenges that face us. By working with community, civic, and corporate leaders, we will ensure that Gwinnett County is ready and prepared to lead into the future.”

Responding to the COVID-19 pandemic, Hendrickson oversaw the conversion of a shuttered department store at Gwinnett Place Mall into the county’s first mass vaccination site. At its opening, she stated, “We saw a need, we had the resources, and we kicked into high gear to make sure that we could meet a critical need in our community.” In April 2021, she launched Project RESET 2.0, expanding Gwinnett’s emergency rental and utility assistance program with millions in federal funding to support renters impacted by the pandemic.

In 2021, Hendrickson helped establish the Gwinnett Entrepreneur Center, an incubator providing training and space for local businesses and entrepreneurs. “Small businesses are essential to a thriving economy — bringing jobs, stimulating economic growth and driving innovation,” she said at the program’s launch.

Hendrickson was also the first Gwinnett County Chair to create a transparent application process for appointments to boards, authorities, and committees, and worked with the Board to establish the Police Citizens Advisory Board and the Sustainability Commission.

During the inaugural Gwinnett Chamber Diversity, Equity and Inclusion Summit, she announced the Gwinnett Place Mall Redevelopment Equity Plan and the County’s first Equity Action Plan, highlighting Gwinnett’s commitment to embedding equity in local government operations. She later appointed the County’s first Chief Equity Officer. Hendrickson has also issued proclamations celebrating Juneteenth and recognizing the 1911 lynching of Charles Hale — the first time the County formally acknowledged this historic injustice — as well as Gwinnett’s first proclamation for LGBTQ+ Pride Month.

Continuing this focus on equitable growth and community investment, in 2023 Hendrickson’s administration launched Gwinnett County’s largest-ever Small Business Grant Program, providing $18 million in direct support to local entrepreneurs. Under her leadership, the County earned a record number of National Association of Counties (NACo) Achievement Awards, recognizing innovation in service delivery and community impact.

In 2024, the County established its first dedicated Affordable Housing Development Fund, expanding housing options for residents at all income levels. Hendrickson also guided the adoption of a $17 billion Transit Development Plan, the most comprehensive in the County’s history, aimed at improving regional connectivity for decades to come.

As part of revitalization efforts, Hendrickson secured a partnership with CBRE, a global real estate firm, to lead redevelopment planning for the Gwinnett Place Mall site, with the goal of transforming it into a vibrant mixed-use community hub.

== Personal life ==
Hendrickson is a Native of Providence, Rhode Island where she was born and raised with her identical twin sister. She moved to Georgia in 2005 to pursue graduate studies at the University of Georgia. She met her husband, Keverne in the early 2000s. They shared a long relationship before getting married in 2010 in Atlanta, Georgia. Nicole and Keverne welcomed their son, Kaden in 2013. Hendrickson and her family reside in unincorporated Lilburn.

== Awards and affiliations ==
Hendrickson was named Georgia Trends 100 Most Influential Georgians since 2023. Hendrickson was the recipient of the Gwinnett Chamber of Commerce's Public Service Award and the 100 Black Men of Metro Atlanta's Trailblazer Award. Hendrickson was named one of Engineering Georgia’s 100 Most Influential Women. She is listed as one of Atlanta Business Chronicle’s Power 100: Most Influential Atlantans and had previously been included on Georgia Trend's top 40 under 40.

Chairwoman Hendrickson is active on several local, regional, statewide, and national boards, including the Atlanta Regional Commission, Metropolitan North Georgia Water District Board, Gwinnett Board of Health, Gwinnett Chamber of Commerce, Georgia Hispanic Chamber of Commerce, and Gwinnett Convention and Visitors Bureau. She serves on the Association County Commissioners of Georgia (ACCG) Policy Steering Committee and in her role with the ARC chaired the Local Leaders Housing Action Committee, a group charged with developing a regional plan to address the Atlanta region’s housing affordability challenges. Chairwoman Hendrickson also serves in leadership roles with the National Association of Counties (NACo) as vice-chair of the Large Urban County Caucus and vice-chair of the workforce development subcommittee of the Community, Economic, and Workforce Development Committee.

Hendrickson was initiated into Delta Sigma Theta sorority in the Spring of 2025 and is a member of the Gwinnett County Alumnae Chapter.
