= Taylor Bennett (American football) =

American attorney and politician from Georgia

Member of the Georgia House of Representatives from the 80th district
- In office August 27, 2015 – January 9, 2017
- Preceded by: Mike Jacobs
- Succeeded by: Meagan Hanson

Personal details
- Born: September 12, 1985 (age 41) St. Louis, Missouri, U.S.
- Party: Democratic
- Education: Georgia Institute of Technology
- Occupation: Attorney, politician

Taylor Bennett (born September 12, 1985) is a former American football quarterback and former member of the Georgia House of Representatives. He began his collegiate career at Georgia Tech before transferring to the Louisiana Tech Bulldogs. He majored in International Affairs at Georgia Tech. He later enrolled as a graduate student majoring in Information Systems Security at Louisiana Tech in the fall of 2008. Taylor also obtained a Juris Doctor degree from Atlanta's John Marshall Law School.

He also played football professionally in Sweden in the Superserien.

== Football career ==
Taylor Bennett
Profile
- Position: Quarterback

Personal information
- Listed height: 6 ft 3 in (1.91 m)
- Listed weight: 215 lb (98 kg)

Career information
- High school: Lafayette High School
- College: Georgia Tech (2004–2007); Louisiana Tech (2008)

Career history
- Stockholm Mean Machines (2009)

=== High school ===
Taylor Bennett attended Lafayette High School in Wildwood, Missouri from 2000 to 2004.

=== College ===
Bennett was selected as the Yellow Jackets' backup quarterback before the 2004 game against the Maryland Terrapins. Prior to the 2007 season, he started in two games; in 2005 against the Connecticut Huskies when Reggie Ball had viral meningitis, and in the 2007 Gator Bowl against the West Virginia Mountaineers when Reggie Ball was academically ineligible to play. At the Connecticut game, Bennett became only the second quarterback in NCAA history to complete a pass for a touchdown in his first ever collegiate play from scrimmage. The only other quarterback to do this was former Southern California quarterback Matt Leinart. In May 2007, Bennett was given a Spring Team honorable mention by The Sporting News in recognition of his outstanding performance in spring practice.

Bennett had a mediocre showing as the starting quarterback in Georgia Tech's 2007 season, finishing 7–6, 4–4 ACC, including a loss to Fresno State. After the 2007 season, Paul Johnson was named as Georgia Tech's new head coach. Many believed that Bennett would not fit well into Johnson's option offense, and in February 2008 Bennett announced that he planned to transfer to another school for the 2008 season. On April 28, it was announced that Bennett would transfer to Louisiana Tech, and the NCAA would allow him to play in the 2008 season rather than sitting out a season as most transfers are required to do.

Bennett won the starting job for the Bulldogs during 2008 fall camp. He led his new team to a victory over the Mississippi State Bulldogs of the Southeastern Conference in the 2008 season opener. Unfortunately, this proved to be the highlight of Bennett's season with the Bulldogs. Over the first five games of the season Bennett completed only 39 percent of his passes. He threw 2 touchdowns and 5 interceptions and led the team to a 2–3 record. After a disappointing loss to Hawaii, in which Bennett threw 2 interceptions, head coach Derek Dooley announced that sophomore Ross Jenkins would start the next game against Idaho. Bennett saw little action for the rest of the season. He went 5 for 11 in only 2 games for no touchdowns and 1 interception.

=== Sweden ===
During the 2009 season, Bennett was the starting quarterback for the Stockholm Mean Machines in Stockholm, Sweden: the season ended with the club's 11th national championship. The Mean Machine had a 8–2 record in the Superserien regular season. Taylor finished the season with 1756 yards passing, 26 touchdowns, and just 3 interceptions. The team won its league playoff semi-final and then won the championship game 24-20 over the Carlstad Crusaders.

In the EFL European Football League the Mean Machine went 1-1, losing in the group playoff stage 22-6 to the Porvoo Butchers of Finland. The Raiders Tirol from Austria won the 2009 Eurobowl EFL final, defeating the La Courneuve Flash 30-19.

== Political career ==
A member of the Democratic Party, Bennett ran in a special election to replace Republican Mike Jacobs for the right to represent District 80 in the Georgia House of Representatives. He won a runoff election against former Brookhaven, Georgia mayor J. Max Davis on August 11, 2015 to capture the seat.

In 2016, Bennett was defeated for reelection by Atlanta attorney Meagan Hanson.

== See also ==
- List of Georgia Tech Yellow Jackets starting quarterbacks
- 2006 Georgia Tech Yellow Jackets football team
- 2007 Georgia Tech Yellow Jackets football team
- 2008 Louisiana Tech Bulldogs football team
