= Meagan Hanson =

American attorney and politician from Georgia

Member of the Georgia House of Representatives from the 80th district
- In office January 9, 2017 – January 13, 2019
- Preceded by: Taylor Bennett
- Succeeded by: Matthew Wilson

Personal details
- Party: Republican
- Education: University of Alabama (BS, JD)

Meagan Hanson is an attorney and former Georgia State Representative from Brookhaven, Georgia. A member of the Republican Party, she defeated Democratic Party incumbent Taylor Bennett in November 2016 in an upset. Hanson represented House District 80, which includes most of Brookhaven along with portions of the adjacent cities of Sandy Springs and Chamblee.

On November 6, 2018, Hanson lost her bid for re-election to Matthew Wilson.

Hanson was a candidate in the Republican primary for Georgia's 6th congressional district in the 2022 election, losing the nomination to Rich McCormick.
