= Democratic Party of Georgia =

Georgia (U.S. state) affiliate of the Democratic Party

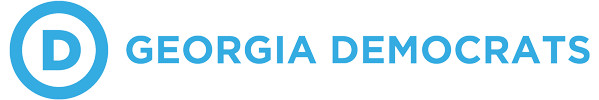
- Chairperson: Charlie Bailey
- Governor-elect: Keisha Lance Bottoms
- Lieutenant Governor-elect: Josh McLaurin
- Senate Minority leader: Harold V. Jones II
- House Majority Leader: Carolyn Hugley (designate)
- Founded: November 21, 1833
- Preceded by: Democratic Party: Clark party (majority); Troup party (Union faction)
- Merged into: Constitutional Union Party (1850–1852)
- National affiliation: Democratic Party
- Colors: Blue
- United States Senate: 2 / 2
- United States House of Representatives: 5 / 14
- Statewide offices: 2 / 13
- Seats in the Georgia Senate: 27 / 56
- Seats in the Georgia House of Representatives: 91 / 180

Election symbol

Website
- georgiademocrat.org

The Democratic Party of Georgia (DPG), until 1840 formally known as the Union Democratic Republican Party, commonly shortened to the Union Party (UP), is the affiliate of the Democratic Party in the U.S. state of Georgia. Since its founding, it has been one of the major political parties in the state and is currently chaired by Charlie Bailey.

As of 2025, Democrats control both U.S. Senate seats, 5 out of Georgia's 14 U.S. House seats, and majorty in the state house. The state house is still under minority control,

Former Democratic president Jimmy Carter served one term as Governor of the state from 1971 to 1975.

== History ==
=== Troup/Clark Rivalry ===
During the later bit of the first party system and early second party system politics in Georgia was divided between two Democratic-Republican, later Democratic, political factions, the Troup party, earlier called the Jackson and Crawford parties, and the Clark party, informally called the Union party after Clark's departure from the state. During the years when the state was dominated by this rivalry, the parties were based around their personalities rather than actual policies. Both factions were extremely similar, supporting slavery, the War of 1812, Indian removal, and opposing protective tariffs, internal improvements, and the national bank. The Troup party were radicals who tended to lean more towards states' rights while the Clarkites were closer to the Union.

Support for the Troup party typically came from Virginian immigrants, aristocratic plantation owners, and residents of the more prosperous and populated areas of the state. In contrast, the Clark party was rooted in the state's poorer, more frontier areas. These affiliations, however, were not rigid, as historian Kenneth Coleman noted, describing them as "vague tendencies in a fluid, confused, highly partisan political milieu that defied logical explanation."

=== Nullification Crisis, founding, and early years ===
During the Nullification crisis, the factions fractured into nullifier and union (or anti-nullification) men. In the lead up to the 1833 elections, newspapers began appealing to so called "Troup Union", "Clark Nullifiers," "Troup Nullifiers," and "Clark Union" men. In the gubernatorial election, Union (Clark) nominee for governor, Lumpkin, won the governorship with the help of defections to the party from "Troup Union" men—who, while they might have agreed with the characterization of Troup as a staunch state rights man, believed that the Troup party had become dominated by Nullifiers.

In the aftermath of the elections, on evening of November 13, 1833, Troup party leaders joined the Troup members of the General Assembly in a caucus, passing resolutions changing the name of the party to the State Rights Party of Georgia (SRP), adopting the Kentucky and Virginia Resolutions as the official creed of the party, and pledging to work for the repeal of the Force Bill. Eight days later, the Clarkites followed suit, creating the "Union Democratic Republican Party" (UP). Most Troupers, and Nullifer Clarkites, formed the former party, which favored Nullification; most Clarkites, along with Union Troupers formed the latter party, which opposed nullification. The SRP, though disliking the prominent northern Whigs, would gravitate towards the national Whig Party due to their anti-Jackson stance, while the UP, being a pro-Jackson party, would align more closely with the Democrats.

Right out of the gate, the new party was divided over how it would organize itself statewide. John A. Cuthbert's flagship paper, the Federal Union, advocated for the formation of county associations, as the SRP had done, but in counties where Union Troup men were in the majority, UP meetings refused to form associations, such as one in Warren County that thought forming an association would be "inexpedient, and dangerous to the peace of the good citizens of this county." The party was divided between Clark Union men, who believed Nullification threatened the union, and Troup Union men, who argued that Troup's doctrine of States' Rights was not the same thing as Calhoun's Nullification. More Troup Union men would join the party as they realised how pro-nullification members of the SRP were, though anti-nullifers did exist in the SRP. By 1835, the reorganization of the parties was complete, though they were neither in name or principle amalgamated with the national parties.

In 1834 and 1835, the UP, "waving the bloody shirt" of support for the Union and President Jackson, swept the SRP in the legislature, congressional, and gubernatorial elections. Recognizing the unpopularity of the stance, the SPR would attempt to distance itself from Nullification, though with little initial success. This would not stop the UP from continuing to label the SRP as Nullifiers. Within the UP, divisions emerged over their support of Van Buren—whom many in the old Clark faction despised for his support of Crawford in the 1824 presidential election—as well as over policies such as Jackson's removal of federal deposits from the Bank of the United States and the administration of the Central Bank of Georgia, which they now controlled. These internal divisions ultimately led to the UP's defeat in the 1836 presidential election and the 1837 gubernatorial election, where they lost to George R. Gilmer, an anti-nullifier.

=== 1840 and second reorganization ===
In the runup to the 1840 presidential election, the UP once again committed itself to supporting the Van Buren, despite internal opposition. The selection was less certain for the SRP, as many within the party could not support leading candidate Henry Clay and his American system, which included the policy of bank revival, on the basis of Troup's States' Rights doctrine. The paper Georgia Argus, as opposed to other SRP papers, went as far as to say they would rather support Van Buren than Clary or some other third candidate that would make Clay's election easier. SRP newspapers recommended their party "stand aloof" from both presidential candidates, waiting instead for the emergence of a "distinguished southern man," who would protect the interests of the region, eventually landing on Troup.

When the convention chose Harrison over Clay, SRP papers were at first stunned but eventually warmed up to him, admitting that they had only backed a Troup candidacy as a tactic to prevent Van Buren from winning Georgia. Now, however, Georgians were so outraged by the economic hardships brought on by Van Buren's policies that the SRP no longer felt the need for such subterfuge, dividing the party. Some members, opposed to the national Whigs, a party full of former Federalists, and who, alongside Harrison, favored the protective tariff and bank renewal, met in Columbus and resolved that they could support neither the Whig Party nor Harrison. Instead, though they had opposed Andrew Jackson, they now found themselves constrained to support Van Buren in the upcoming election. By June 1840, both parties were bleeding support with even prominent SRP members Troup and Henry Lamar expressing their opposition to Harrison's policies and reluctant support for Van Buren. The state convention the same month nominated Harrison and made John Berrien, a proponent of the Whig Party and its ideology, president of the SRP, causing more to move into the UP camp on the basis of States' Rights. These included congressmen Mark Cooper, Walter Colquitt, and Edward Black who aided the UP's increasing influence by Troup's doctrine of state rights and eventually found themselves in prominent positions within the UP hierarchy, much to the dismay of some long time members. Meanwhile, UP members who opposed Van Buren shifted their support to the SRP. The SRP swept all offices.

=== Third reorganization ===
By early 1841, the UP had largely abandoned its old label, adopting instead variations of the name used by the party of Andrew Jackson: "Democrats," "the Democracy," "Democratic Republicans," "Republican Democratic Party," and "State Rights Democratic Party." The inclusion of "State Rights" in the party's name seemed to validate the claims made by the congressmen defectors, that true believers in States' Rights could now only be found within the ranks of the Democratic Party. The SRP, too, was going under a name change, with SRP newspapers using various titles such as the "Harrison Party," the "State Rights Party," the "State Rights and Harrison Party," the "Whig and State Rights party," and even just the "Whig Party of Georgia". Ironically, the once anti-Jackson SRP, which had formed in favor of nullification, were becoming supporters of the Union, while the once pro-Jackson UP, which had formed in opposition to nullification, was becoming a staunch supporter of States' Rights. By the end of 1845, the parties finally had adopted national party names as their own and reshaped their principles accordingly.

=== Compromise of 1850 and the formation of a new party ===
By 1849 both parties had come to see the possibility of the passage of the Wilmot Proviso, the admission of California, the abolition of slavery in the District of Columbia, or the refusal of Northern states to deliver up fugitive slaves as threats to the South, with the general assembly passing a bill mandating the governor to call a state convention if any of these events occurred. Meanwhile, in Congress, Georgia Whig leaders Alexander H. Stephens and Robert Toombs divorced from their national party and entered into negotiations with Speaker Howell Cobb, a Democrat, to form a coalition supporting compromise measures aimed at preserving the Union.

In Georgia, political leaders, beginning in Macon, started a movement to unify the state parties to preserve the union, which rapidly spread across the state. Prominent Democrats such as Herschel V. Johnson, a few old SRP Whigs, and Fire-Eaters William Lowndes Yancey of Alabama and Robert Barnwell of South Carolina, also met in Macon, forming the Anti-Union or "Resistance" group.

Thus, by the time Governor George W. Towns called a state convention in response to the admission of California, party lines had already fractured and reorganized. In the ensuing election of delegates to the convention, acting as a referendum of the Compromise of 1850, Unionists outnumbered the resistance nine to one. At the convention, Unionists issued the Georgia Platform, which affirmed support for the Compromise of 1850 but warned that it was "final solution" to the issue of slavery's expansion. In three evening caucuses held from December 11–13, Whigs and Democrats formalized their coalition by creating a new party: the Constitutional Union Party.

At its first convention in June 1851, while agreeing to replace Berrin, who drifted into the resistance, with former Whig Toombs, the governor nomination was given to former Democrat Cobb, and the executive committee of the new party of made up of mostly former Democrats. With their new majority in the general assembly, the Constitutional Union Party split spoils as agreed but the party was divided between "Union Democrats" and "Union Whigs." Each faction sent delegates to their respective national party conventions for 1852. The resistance party changed its name to the Southern Rights Party and sent delegates to the Democratic convention with an electoral ticket of successionist.

In the following Constitutional Union convention, the dominant Democrats nominated Franklin Pierce, causing anti-Pierce/anti-Scott Whigs to walk out of the convention. These dissenting Whigs hoped to nominate Daniel Webster and throw the election into the House of Representatives, which they proceeded to do at a separate convention in Macon. Simultaneously, pro-Winfield Scott Whigs nominated their preferred candidate. Following these conventions, the Democratic majority on the Constitutional Union Party's executive committee declared the party dissolved. Union Democrats who refused to support the Southern Rights Party-sponsored Pierce ticket fielded their own Pierce ticket. In the end, the Southern Rights-Democrat ticket won the 1852 election over the other three competing tickets, showing that while Georgians supported the compromise, they also demanded more specific recognition of "Southern Rights" basis for the future. In the aftermath, the Southern Rights Party of Georgia was absorbed into the national Democratic Party, dropping its former title and uniting with the other Democratic faction.

=== Reconstruction to Civil rights era ===
Republicans had power during the Reconstruction era after the American Civil War when blacks could vote. There were numerous Republican African American officeholders from the end of the Civil War until before 1900 in Georgia including the "Original 33". Then for over a century, the Democratic Party dominated Georgia state and local politics with a membership largely consisting of white conservative rural Southern Democrats. From 1872 to 2002, the Democratic Party controlled the governorship, both houses of the state legislature, and most statewide offices. From 1912 to 1934, the Democratic nominee for governor went unchallenged in the general election, while Democrats repeatedly constituted the sole party representation in Georgia's congressional delegation (1883–1890, 1893–1964), State Senate (1879–1880, 1883–1886, 1891–1892, 1905–1910, 1917–1920, 1929–1930, 1951–1952) and State House (1909–1910, 1931–1934).

After the end of Reconstruction, the party's primary method of nomination for statewide office was through its state convention, in which county committees elected delegates to represent each county to the state convention. Starting in 1874, Fulton County's Democratic committee adopted the direct primary for state convention delegates, and by 1886, approximately half of the state's Democratic county committees held primaries to both nominate primary candidates for statewide elections as well as elect pledged delegates to the state convention. In 1892, the state executive committee voted to recommend that all county committees hold primaries for statewide elections, and made it mandatory for all counties in 1898 in addition to mandating a single date for all county primaries. By 1900, the White primary was established for all Democratic primaries, in 1917, the General Assembly passed the Neilly Primary Act, which statutorily established the County unit system for the party's primary. The white primary remained in place until the decision in King v. Chapman (1945), but the county unit system remained in place until Gray v. Sanders (1963).

=== Civil rights era to modern day ===
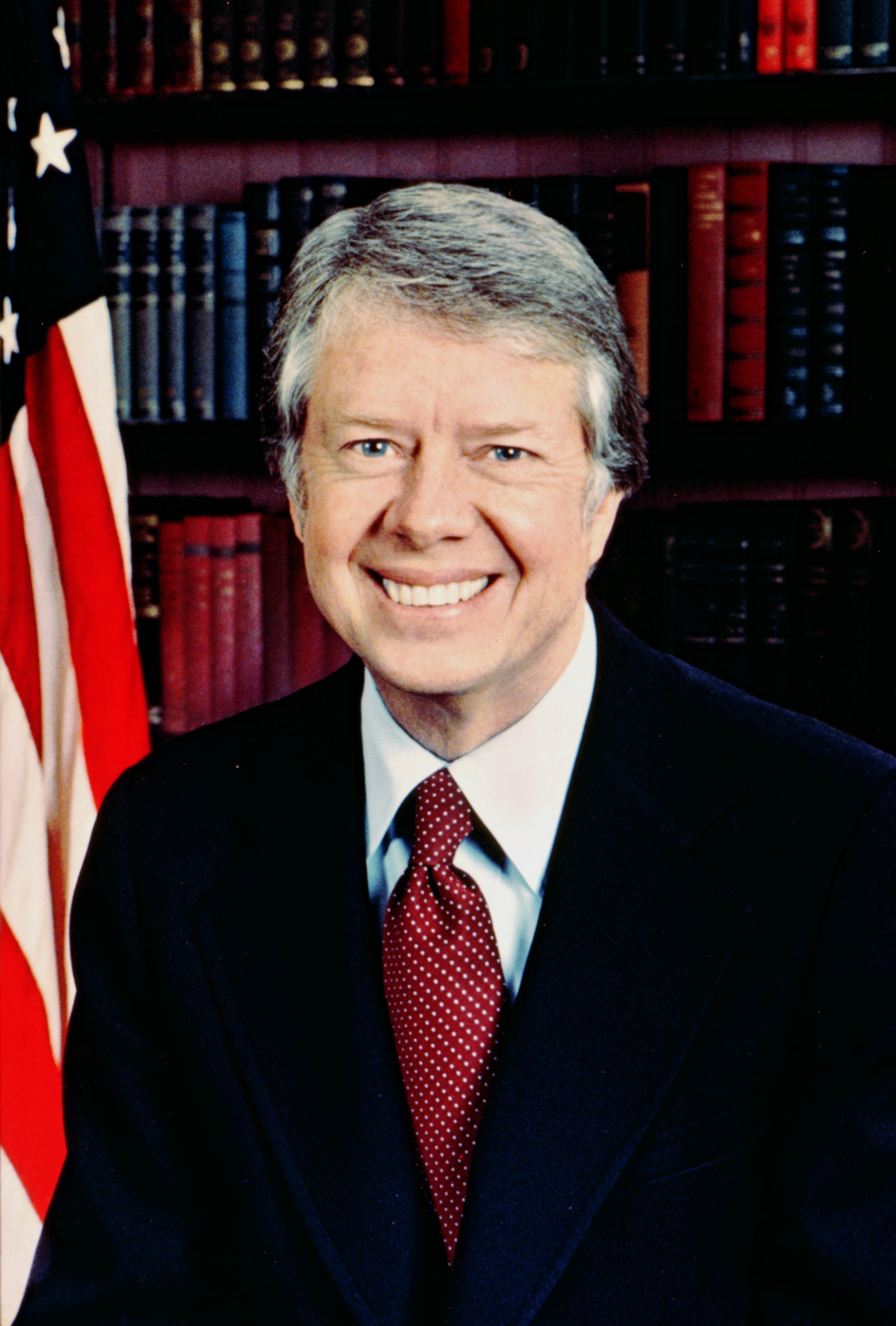
President Jimmy Carter (1977−1981)

In 1976, former Democratic governor Jimmy Carter (1971−1975) was elected the 39th president of the United States. The state party underwent several reforms in the 1970s which loosened the party's relationship with the state government.

After switching to the Republican Party in 1998, Sonny Perdue went on to defeat Democrat Roy Barnes in the 2002 gubernatorial election. In 2004, the Democratic Party lost control of the Georgia House of Representatives, putting the party in the minority for the first time in state history.

The Democratic Party of Georgia entered the 2010 elections with hopes that former governor Roy Barnes could win back the governorship. Polls showed a tight race between Barnes and Republican gubernatorial nominee Nathan Deal, with some predicting a runoff election. However, on election day, Republicans won every statewide office.

Since the passage of the Affordable Care Act, Georgia Democrats have advocated Medicaid expansion in the state, a policy that would provide a federally subsidized healthcare plan to about 500,000 Georgians. At $5.15 an hour, Georgia is one of only two states with a state minimum wage below the federal minimum wage; a priority for Georgia Democrats in the 2010s and 2020s has been increasing the minimum wage.

Since 2016, Georgia Democrats have begun to see better results, with them getting very close to winning the governorship in 2018. In 2020, Joe Biden narrowly won the state, the first time for a Democratic presidential candidate since 1992. Not long after that, Democrats Jon Ossoff and Raphael Warnock won both of the state's U.S. Senate seats in runoff elections in 2021, the first time Democrats won statewide office since 2006.

Warnock would be elected to a full term in 2022, defeating Republican nominee Herschel Walker.

== Leadership ==
Officers of the Democratic Party of Georgia are elected by the state Democratic committee at a January meeting following each regular gubernatorial election. Officers serve four-year terms, and there is no limit on the number of terms an individual can serve as an officer. Below are the current officers:

- Chair: Charlie Bailey
- First Vice Chair: Matthew Wilson
- Vice Chair of Candidate Recruitment: Scout Smith
- Vice Chair of Congressional District Chairs and County Party Liaison: Sarah Todd
- Vice Chair of Constituency Groups: Vinny Olsziewski
- Secretary: Stephanie Newell
- Treasurer: Daniel Coley
- House Leader: Carolyn Hugley
- Senate Leader: Harold Jones

The officers serve on the executive committee, which also includes the DPG's chairs of congressional districts and the DPG's representatives to the Democratic National Committee. The entire executive committee is elected by and from the DPG's State Committee, which consists of over 300 members elected by the DPG's county committees. The apportionment of State Committee members per county is determined by dividing the last census population of the state by the total number of districts in both houses of the Georgia General Assembly (233), and dividing the quotient by the last census population of each county.

Unlike most Democratic state parties where precinct committees and captains constitute the basic unit below the county level, the majority of the DPG's county committees consist of "post seat holders" elected from each county commission district.

The state party holds its state convention in the summer of gubernatorial election years following the gubernatorial primary, one of the few quadrennial Democratic state party conventions in the United States. The state convention consists of both State Committee members and equal numbers of convention delegates, as well as at-large delegates appointed by state party leadership.

=== Caucuses and affiliates ===
- AAPI Caucus
- African American Caucus
- Democratic Women's Council
- Disability Caucus
- Georgia Democratic Rural Council
- Georgia Federation of Democratic Women
- Georgia House Democrats
- Georgia Senate Democrats
- Greening Georgia
- Latino Caucus
- LGBTQ Caucus
- Senior Caucus
- Veterans Caucus
- Young Democrats of Georgia

== Current elected officials ==
=== Members of Congress ===
Democrats hold five of Georgia's 14 seats in the U.S. House of Representatives and both of Georgia's seats in the U.S. Senate.

==== U.S. Senate ====
Democrats have controlled both of Georgia's seats in the U.S. Senate since 2021:

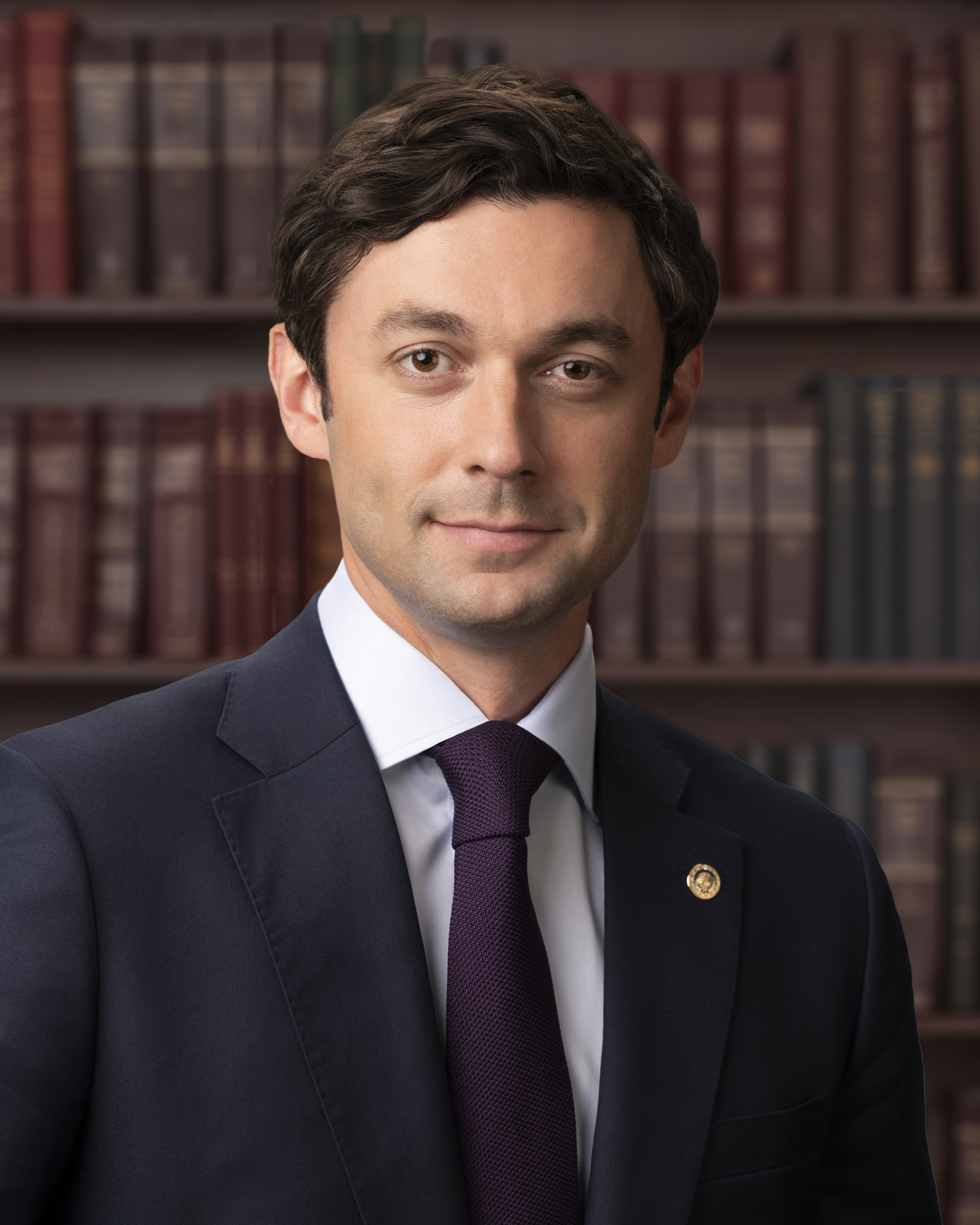
Senior U.S. Senator Jon Ossoff

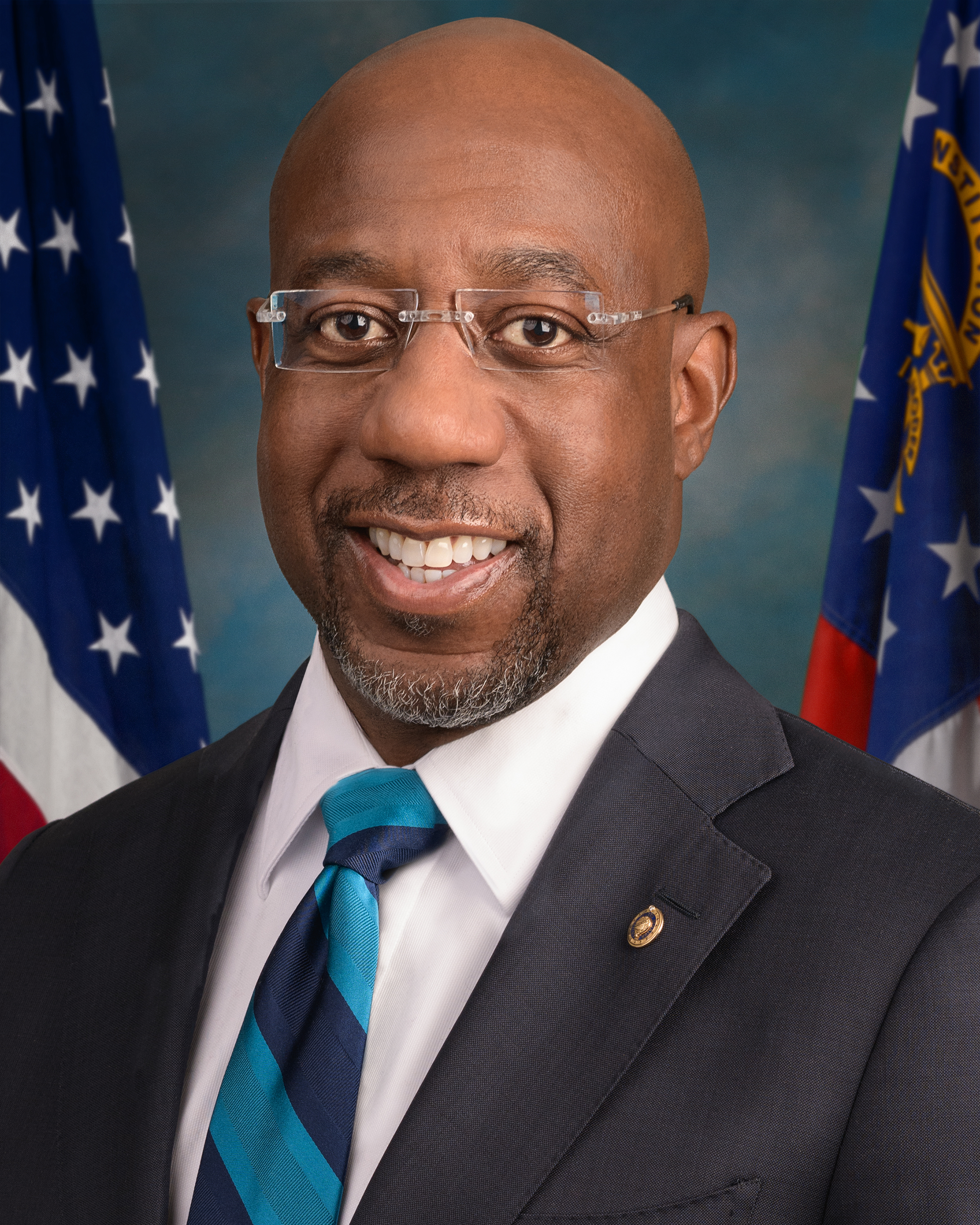
Junior U.S. Senator Raphael Warnock

==== U.S. House of Representatives ====
District	Member	Photo
2nd	Sanford Bishop	
4th	Hank Johnson	
5th	Nikema Williams	
7th	Lucy McBath	
13th	Everton Blair	
13th	Jasmine Clark (elect)	

=== State officials ===
Governor-elect Keisha Lance Bottoms

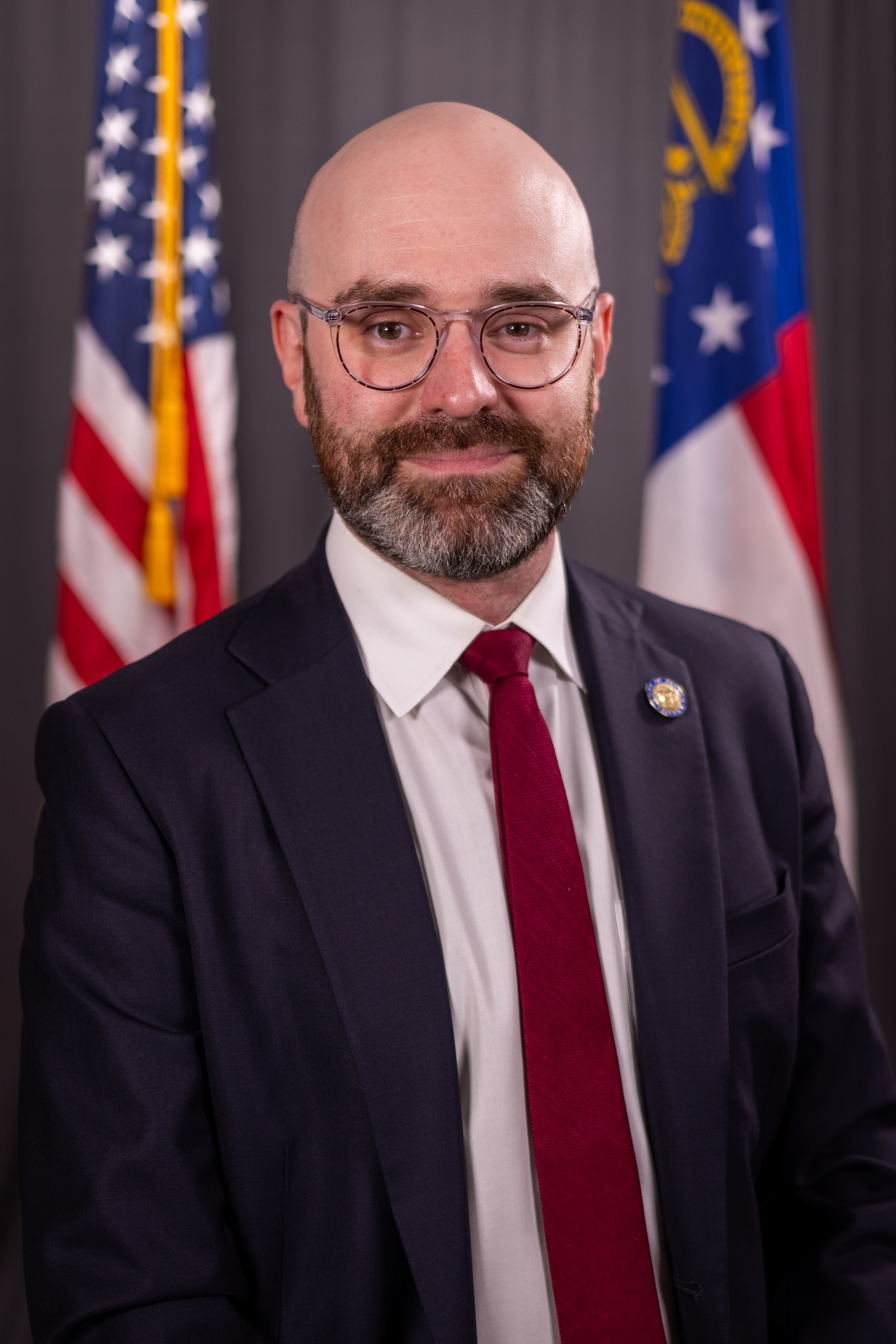
Lieutenant Governor-elect Josh McLaurin

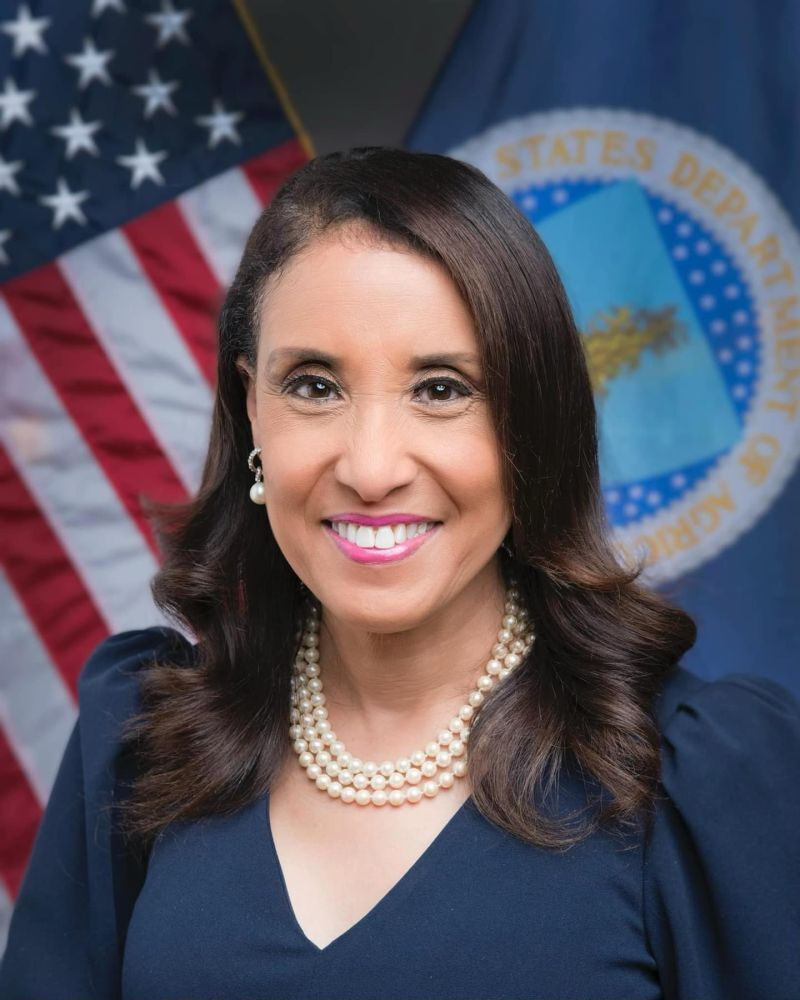
Secretary of State-elect Penny Brown Reynolds

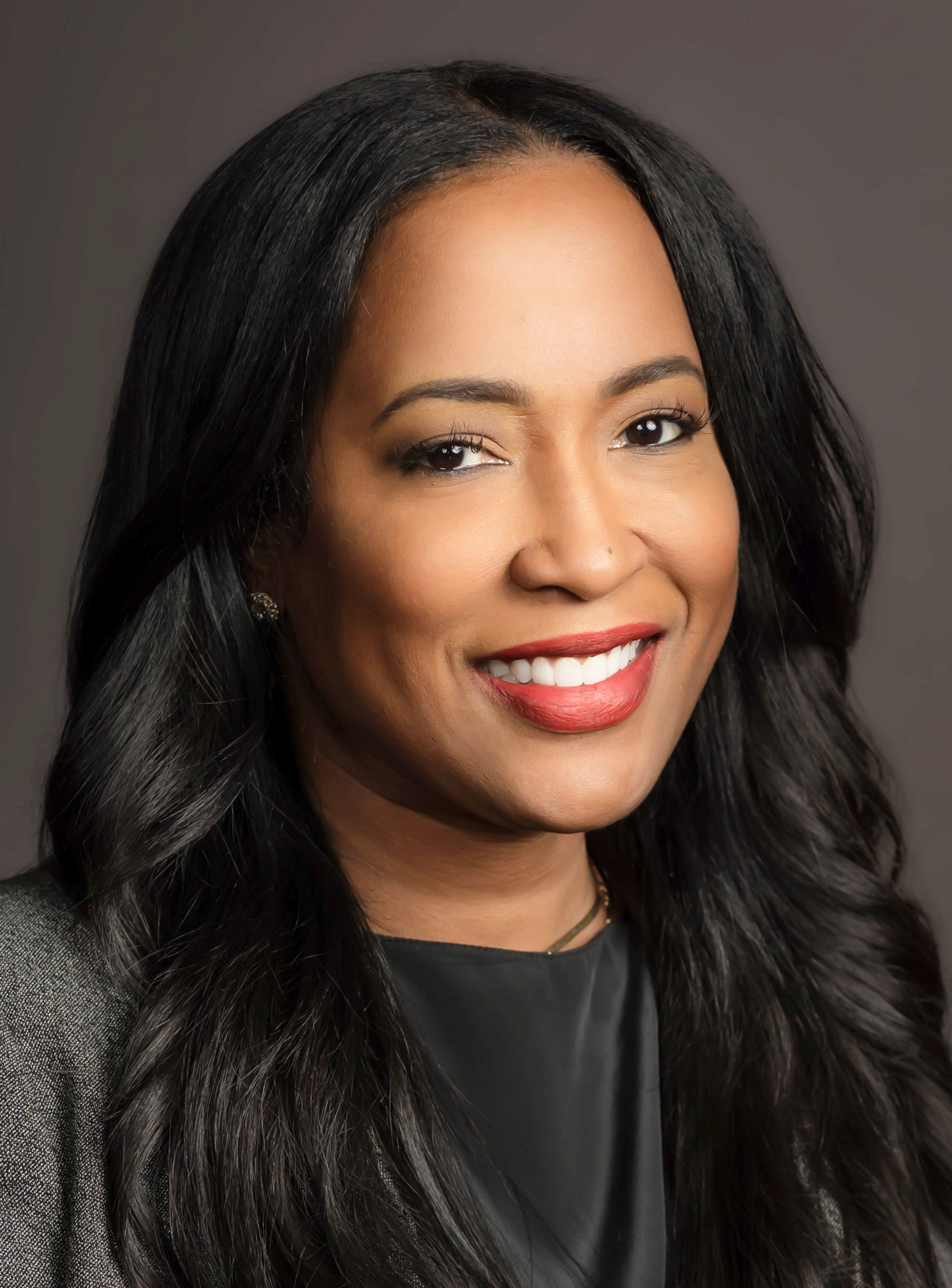
Attorney General-elect Tanya Miller

Insurance Commissioner-elect Keisha Sean Waites
- Labor Commissioner-elect: Nikki Porcher
- State Superintendent-elect: Lydia Powell
- State Public Service Commissioner: Peter Hubbard and Alicia Johnson

=== State Legislature ===
Democrats control 27 of the 56 State Senate seats and 91 of the 180 State House seats. Two-year terms of office apply to both chambers, and the entire membership of each body is elected at the same time in even-numbered years.

- Senate
  - Current senators
  - Senate Minority Leader: Harold V. Jones II (SD22)
  - Senate Deputy Minority Leader: Kim Jackson (SD41)
  - Senate Minority Caucus Chair: Elena Parent (SD42)
- House
  - Current representatives
  - House Majority Leader: Carolyn Hugley (HD141)
  - House Majority Whip: Sam Park (HD107)
  - House Majority Caucus Chair: Tanya F. Miller (HD62)

=== Municipal ===
The following Democrats hold prominent mayoralties in Georgia:

- Atlanta: Andre Dickens (1)
- Savannah: Van R. Johnson (5)
- Athens: Kelly Girtz (6)

== Election results ==
=== Presidential ===
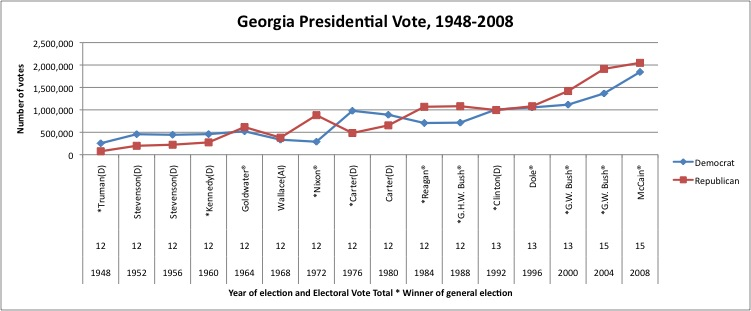

Since 1948, Democrats have won Georgia's presidential electoral votes 9 times, while Republicans have won Georgia 10 times. However, in the last 10 presidential elections, Democrats have won Georgia only twice, in 1992 and 2020.

=== Federal ===
==== U.S. Senate ====
Class 2
Year	Candidate	Votes	%	Result
1984	Sam Nunn	1,344,104	79.94%	Won ✓
1990	Sam Nunn	1,033,439	100%	Won ✓
1996	Max Cleland	1,103,993	48.87%	Won ✓
2002	Max Cleland	931,857	45.90%	Lost ✗
2008	Jim Martin	909,923	42.56%	Lost ✗
2014	Michelle Nunn	1,160,811	45.21%	Lost ✗
2020	Jon Ossoff	2,269,923	50.61%	Won ✓
2026	Jon Ossoff	2,469,059	59.02%	Won ✓

Class 3
Year	Candidate	Votes	%	Result
1986	Wyche Fowler	623,707	50.92%	Won ✓
1992	Wyche Fowler	618,774	49.35%	Lost ✗
1998	Michael Coles	791,904	41.45%	Lost ✗
2000 (sp.)	Zell Miller	1,413,224	58.19%	Won ✓
2004	Denise Majette	1,287,695	39.98%	Lost ✗
2010	Mike Thurmond	996,516	39.00%	Lost ✗
2016	Jim Barksdale	1,599,726	41.04%	Lost ✗
2016	Raphael Warnock	2,289,113	51.04%	Won ✓
2022	Raphael Warnock	1,820,633	51.40%	Won ✓

==== U.S. House ====
Election	Votes	%	Seats (GA)	±	%
2016	1,498,437	39.74	4 / 14	0	1.74
2018	1,814,469	47.72	5 / 14	▲1	8
2020	2,393,089	49.00	6 / 14	▲1	1.27
2022	1,863,870	47.69	5 / 14	▼1	1.31
2024	2,434,984	47.50	5 / 14	0	0.29
2026	2,342,772	56.21	5 / 14	0	8.71

=== State ===
==== Executive offices ====
Governor
Election	Gubernatorial candidate	Votes	Vote %	Result
1962	Carl Sanders	494,978	58.07%	Won ✓
1962	Marvin Griffin	332,746	39.04%	Lost ✗
1966	Lester Maddox	450,626	46.22%	Won ✓
1970	Jimmy Carter	620,419	59.35%	Won ✓
1974	George Busbee	646,777	69.01%	Won ✓
1978	George Busbee	534,572	80.65%	Won ✓
1982	Joe Frank Harris	734,090	62.82%	Won ✓
1986	Joe Frank Harris	828,465	70.51%	Won ✓
1990	Zell Miller	766,662	54.89%	Won ✓
1994	Zell Miller	788,926	51.05%	Won ✓
1998	Roy Barnes	941,076	52.49%	Won ✓
2002	Roy Barnes	937,062	46.25%	Lost ✗
2006	Mark Taylor	811,049	43.92%	Lost ✗
2010	Roy Barnes	1,107,011	42.97%	Lost ✗
2014	Jason Carter	1,144,794	44.88%	Lost ✗
2018	Stacey Abrams	1,923,685	48.83%	Lost ✗
2022	Stacey Abrams	1,813,673	45.88%	Lost ✗
2026	Keisha Lance Bottoms	2,273,818	54.34%	Won ✓

Lieutenant Governor
Year	Candidate	Votes	%	Result
2014	Connie Stokes	1,062,557	42.01%	Lost ✗
2018	Sarah Riggs Amaco	1,823,118	48.37%	Lost ✗
2022	Charlie Bailey	1,815,524	46.43%	Lost ✗
2026	Josh McLaurin	2,327,235	55.9%	Won ✓

Attorney General
Year	Candidate	Votes	%	Result
2014	Greg Hecht	1,087,268	43.07%	Lost ✗
2018	Charlie Bailey	1,800,807	48.70%	Lost ✗
2022	Jen Jordan	1,826,437	46.60%	Lost ✗
2026	Tanya Miller	2,320,270	55.55%	Won ✓

Secretary of State
Year	Candidate	Votes	%	Result
2018	John Barrow	709,049	48.11%	Lost ✗
2022	Bee Nguyen	1,719,922	43.99%	Lost ✗
2026	Penny Brown Reynolds	2,324,667	55.71%	Won ✓

== List of chairs ==
=== Elected by the state convention ===
- Thomas Hardeman (1872)
- L. N. Trammell (1880)
- Charles F. Clay (1883)
- B. H. Bigham (1886)
- Hoke Smith (1888)
- William Yates Atkinson (1890–1892)
- Allen Fort (1892–1894)
- Alexander Stephens Clay (1894–1898)
- Fleming W. Dubignon (1898–1900)
- E. T. Brown (1902–1904)
- E. J. Yeomans (1904–1906)
- Alexander Lawton Miller (1906–1908)
- Hewlett A. Hall (1908–1909)
- Charles R. Pendleton (1909–1910)
- W. C. Wright (1910–1912)
- William J. Harris (1912–1913)
- William S. West (1913–1914)
- E. J. Reagan (1914–1916)
- John James Flynt Sr. (1916–1920)
- William Jerome Vereen (1920–1921)
- G. E. Maddox (1925–30)
- Lawrence S. Camp (1930–32)
- Hugh Howell (1935–1937)
- Charles S. Reid (1937)
- Jim L. Gillis (1939)
- William Y. Atkinson Jr. (1942)
- J. Lon Duckworth (1943–1946)
- James S. Peters (1948–1954)
- John Sammons Bell (1954–1960)
- J. B. Fuqua (1962–1966)
- James H. Gray Sr. (1966–1970)

=== Appointed by the governor ===
- David Gambrell (1970–1972)
- Charles Kirbo (1972–1974)
- Marge Thurman (1974–1982)
- Al Holloway (1982)
- Bert Lance (1982–1986)
- John Henry Anderson (1986–1990)
- Ed Sims (1990–1994)
- John Blackmon (1994–1998)
- David Worley (1998–2001)
- Calvin Smyre (2001–2004)

=== Elected by the state committee ===
- Bobby Kahn (2004–2007)
- Jane Kidd (2007–2010)
- Mike Berlon (2011–2013)
- Nikema Williams (2013)
- DuBose Porter (2013–2019)
- Nikema Williams (2019–2025)
- Charlie Bailey (2025–)

== See also ==
- Political party strength in Georgia (U.S. state)

== Works cited ==
- Coulter, E. Merton (1921). "The Nullification Movement in Georgia". The Georgia Historical Quarterly. 5 (1): 3–39. JSTOR 40575654.
- Murray, Paul (1945). "Party Organization in Georgia Politics 1825–1853". The Georgia Historical Quarterly. 29 (4): 195–210. JSTOR 40576991.
- Lamplugh, George R. (2015). Rancorous Enmities and Blind Partialities: Factions and Parties in Georgia, 1807–1845. Bloomsbury Publishing PLC. ISBN 9780761865872.
- Coleman, Kenneth (1991). A History of Georgia. University of Georgia Press. ISBN 9780820312699.
- Phillips, Ulrich Bonnell (1902). Georgia and state rights: A study of the political history of Georgia from the Revolution to the Civil War, with particular regard to federal relations. Washington, Government Printing Office.
- Holt, Michael F. (1999). The Rise and Fall of the American Whig Party: Jacksonian Politics and the Onset of the Civil War. Oxford University Press. ISBN 9780195161045.
