= Nikema Williams =

American politician (born 1978)

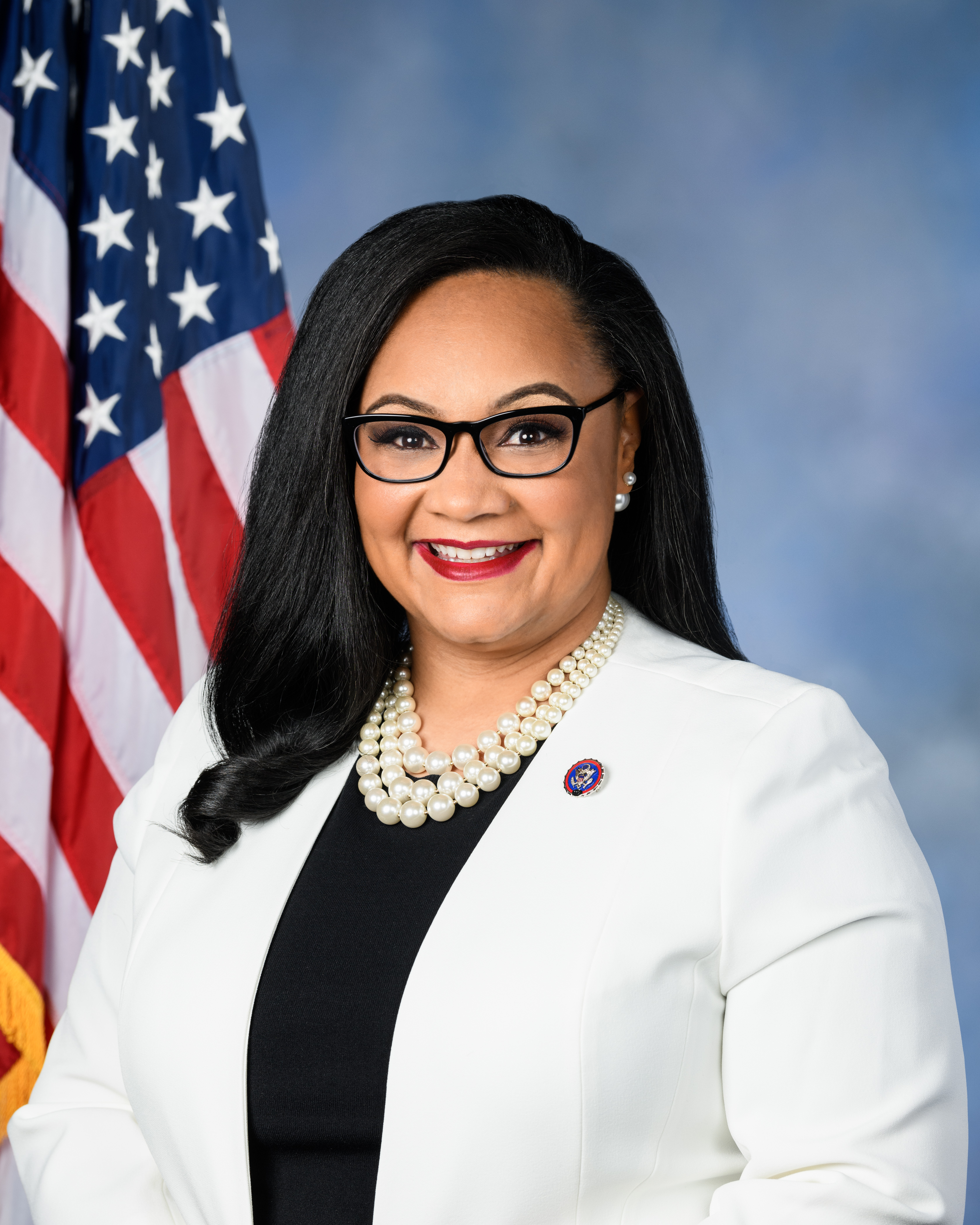
- Official portrait, 2021

Member of the U.S. House of Representatives from Georgia's 5th district
- Incumbent
- Assumed office January 3, 2021
- Preceded by: Kwanza Hall

Chair of the Georgia Democratic Party
- In office January 26, 2019 – March 31, 2025
- Preceded by: DuBose Porter
- Succeeded by: Matthew Wilson (acting)
- In office June 9, 2013 – August 31, 2013; Acting
- Preceded by: Mike Berlon
- Succeeded by: DuBose Porter

Member of the Georgia State Senate from the 39th district
- In office December 5, 2017 – January 3, 2021
- Preceded by: Vincent Fort
- Succeeded by: Sonya Halpern

Personal details
- Born: Nikema Natassha Williams; July 30, 1978 (age 48) Columbus, Georgia, U.S.
- Party: Democratic
- Spouse: Leslie Small
- Children: 1
- Relatives: Autherine Lucy (great-aunt)
- Education: Talladega College (BA)
- Website: House website; Campaign website
- Williams's voice Williams supporting the Economic Development Strategy Act. Recorded March 30, 2022

Nikema Natassha Williams (/nɪˈkiːmə/ nih-KEE-mə; born July 30, 1978) is an American politician serving as the representative for Georgia's 5th congressional district. The district includes almost three-quarters of Atlanta. She was a member of the Georgia State Senate for the 39th district from 2017 to 2021, and served as chair of the Democratic Party of Georgia from 2019 to 2025. Williams served as one of 16 electors for Georgia in the Electoral College following the 2020 United States presidential election.

== Early life and education ==
Williams was born in Columbus, Georgia, and raised in Smiths Station, Alabama. Her grandfather was a neighborhood leader, and her great-aunt Autherine Lucy integrated the University of Alabama. Williams graduated from Talladega College, where she became a member of Alpha Kappa Alpha sorority and earned a Bachelor of Arts degree in biology. After graduating from college, she moved to Atlanta in 2002.

== Early career ==
After moving to Atlanta, Williams joined the Young Democrats of Georgia. She then served as vice president for public policy at Planned Parenthood Southeast. In 2018, she became the state director of the National Domestic Workers Alliance.

== Georgia State Senate ==
In 2017, Williams was elected to the Georgia State Senate in a special election after Vincent Fort resigned to run in the Atlanta mayoral election.

On November 13, 2018, Williams was one of 15 people arrested during a protest at the Georgia State Capitol against the handling of the 2018 Georgia gubernatorial election. The charges were dropped in June 2019.

Williams was one of several Georgia General Assembly members to test positive for COVID-19 after being exposed by fellow member Brandon Beach.

== Party leadership ==
In 2011, she was elected as first vice chair of the Democratic Party of Georgia. She briefly served as the party's interim chair in 2013, after Mike Berlon resigned, and remained as first vice chair under DuBose Porter.

Williams supported Barack Obama's presidential campaigns and served as a member of the Obama Victory Fund in 2012. She was recognized as one of Obama's top bundlers during that campaign cycle, raising over $50,000 for the campaign.

In January 2019, Williams was elected by the DPG State Committee for a full term as chair, and won re-election in 2023. She became the first Black woman, third woman, and second African American to chair the party. She was a delegate to the 2008, 2012 and 2016 Democratic National Conventions, and presided over early successes in federal elections in 2020.

However, Williams faced widespread criticism, including from Senator Jon Ossoff, who reportedly pressed her to resign after the party's performances in the 2022 and 2024 Georgia state elections. In response, Williams announced her intent to resign from party leadership, as well as her proposal for party bylaw amendments to ensure that the next chair would be a full-time, salaried position, which would prohibit her from continuing as DPG chair. On March 31, 2025, two days after the State Committee approved her proposal, Williams resigned as chair, elevating First Vice Chair Matthew Wilson as interim chair.

== U.S. House of Representatives ==
=== Elections ===
==== 2020 ====
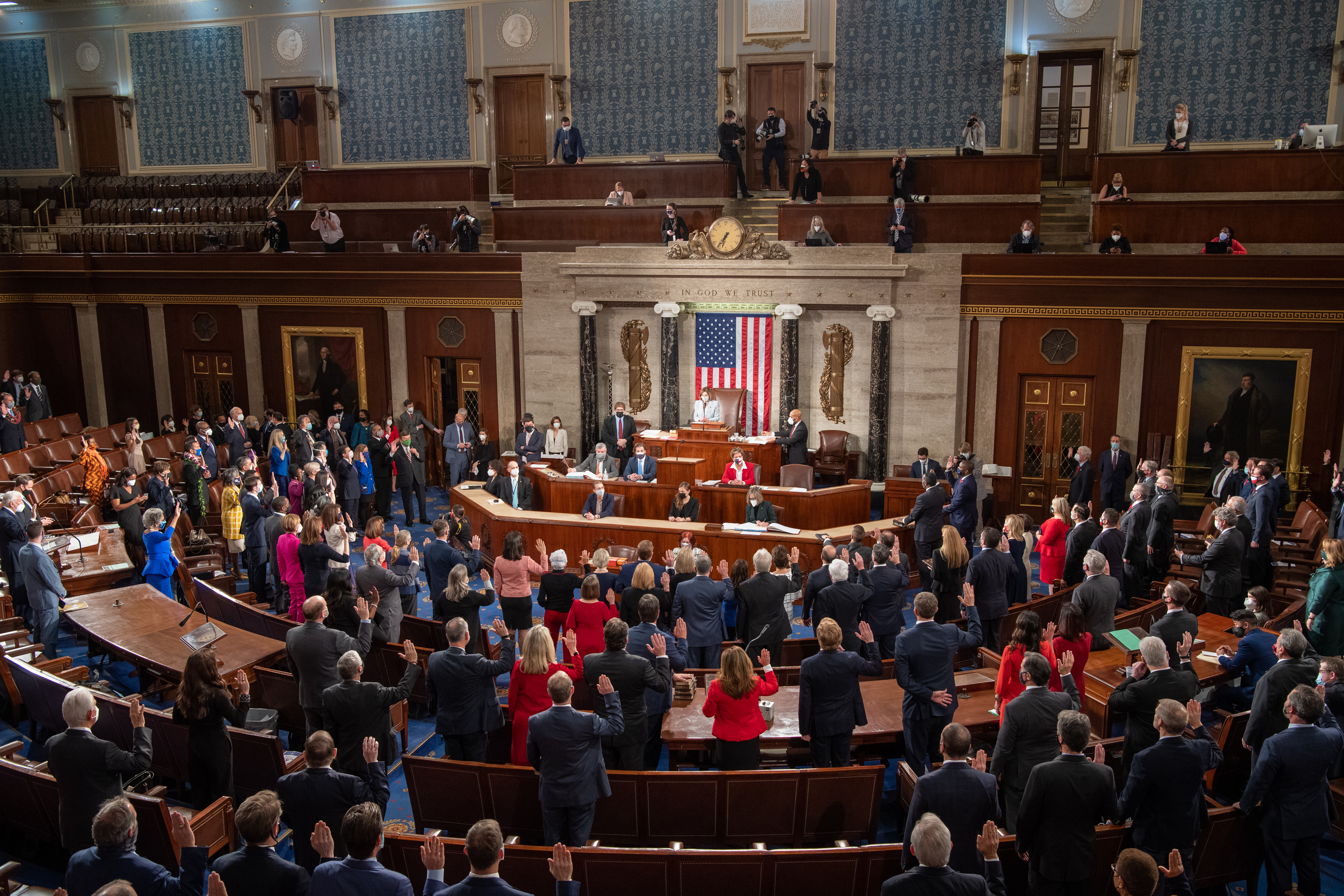
Williams and the 117th Congress are sworn into the U.S. House of Representatives, 2021.

On July 20, 2020, after the death of John Lewis, Williams was selected by the DPG Executive Committee to replace him on the November ballot for Georgia's 5th congressional district in the 2020 election. The 5th is so heavily Democratic that Williams had been all but assured of a seat in Congress when she was selected to replace Lewis on the ballot. Georgia Governor Brian Kemp called a September 2020 special election to fill the remainder of Lewis's 17th term. Williams opted to not run in the special election, choosing instead to focus on her role as party chair. The special election was won by Atlanta city councilman Kwanza Hall, who served for a month before handing the seat to Williams. In the general election, she handily defeated Republican Angela Stanton-King by a 70-point margin.

==== 2022 ====
Williams held her seat in the 2022 elections against Republican Christian Zimm by a 65-point margin.

==== 2024 ====
Williams won reelection in the 2024 elections against Republican John Salvesen by a 71-point margin.

=== Tenure ===
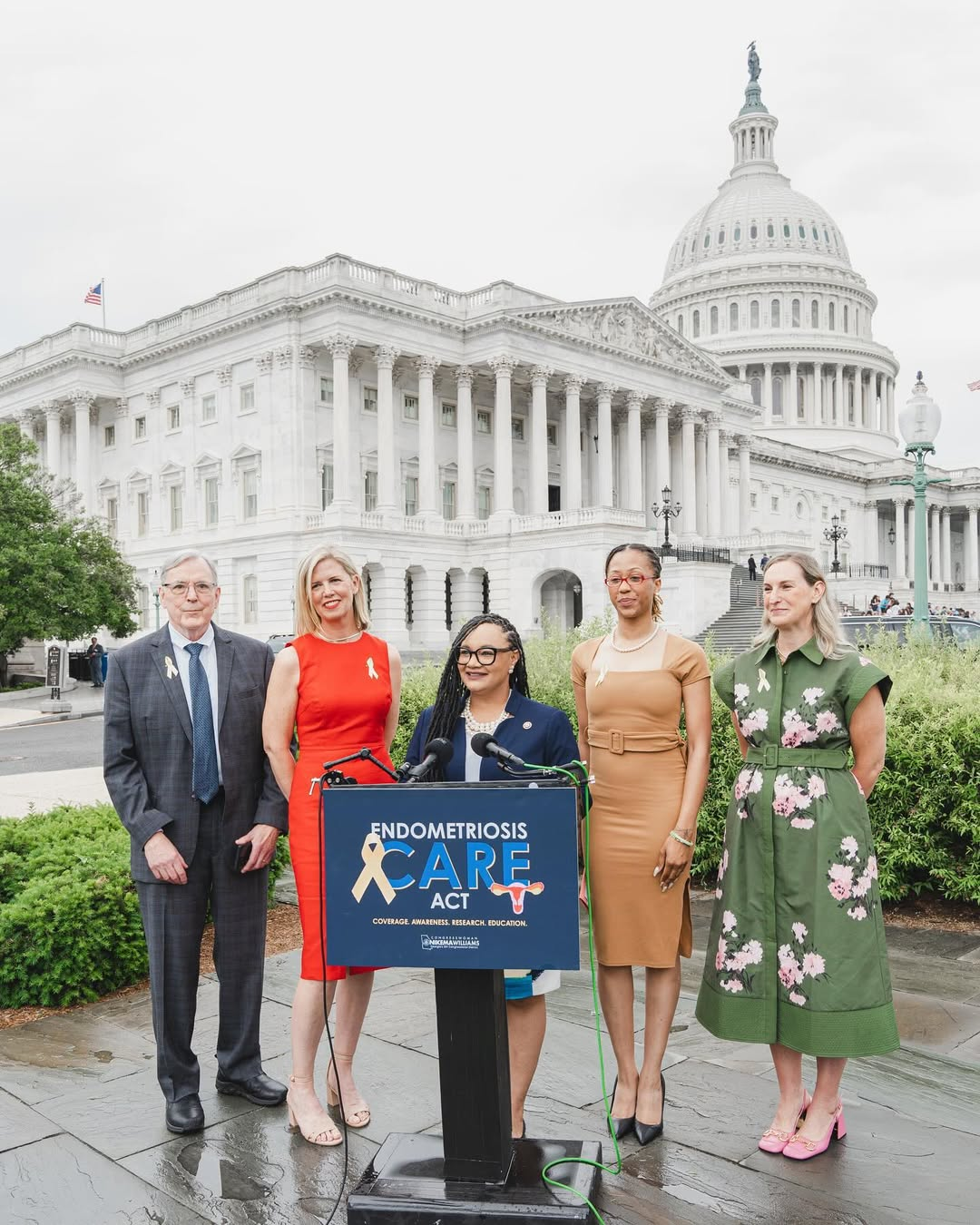
Williams introduces a bill to fund endometriosis research, 2024.

Williams was one of two Democrats in December 2023 along with Bobby Scott to vote against the expulsion of now-former New York representative George Santos.

=== Committee assignments ===
For the 119th Congress:

- Committee on Financial Services
  - Subcommittee on Housing and Insurance
  - Subcommittee on Oversight and Investigations

=== Caucus memberships ===
- Black Maternal Health Caucus
- Congressional Progressive Caucus
- Future Forum
- New Democrat Coalition
- Congressional Caucus for the Equal Rights Amendment
- Congressional Equality Caucus

== Personal life ==
Williams's husband, Leslie Small, was a former aide to John Lewis. They met while campaigning for Democrats during the 2008 elections. They have one son.

She is a former member of UFCW.

== See also ==
- List of African-American United States representatives
- Women in the United States House of Representatives

Party political offices
Preceded by Mike Berlon	Chair of the Georgia Democratic Party; Acting; 2013	Succeeded by DuBose Porter
Preceded by DuBose Porter	Chair of the Georgia Democratic Party; 2019–2025	Succeeded by Matthew Wilson; Acting
U.S. House of Representatives
Preceded by Kwanza Hall	Member of the U.S. House of Representatives from Georgia's 5th congressional district 2021–present	Incumbent
U.S. order of precedence (ceremonial)
Preceded by Beth Van Duyne	United States representatives by seniority 279th	Succeeded by Julia Letlow
