= 2020 Georgia's 5th congressional district special election =

- September 29, 2020; December 1, 2020 (runoff)

Georgia's 5th congressional district
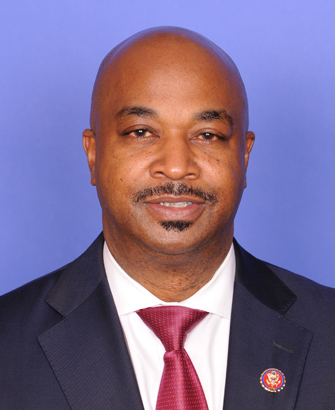

Candidate	Kwanza Hall	Robert Michael Franklin Jr.
Party	Democratic	Democratic
Popular vote	13,450	11,332
Percentage	54.27%	45.73%
- Hall: 50–60% 60–70% 70–80% 80–90% >90% Franklin: 50–60% 60–70% 70–80% 80–90% >90% Tie: 50% No votes
U.S. Representative before election
Vacant
Elected U.S. Representative
Kwanza Hall
Democratic

A special election filled the remainder of the term in the United States House of Representatives for Georgia's 5th congressional district in the 116th United States Congress. Incumbent representative John Lewis, who was diagnosed with pancreatic cancer in December 2019, died on July 17, 2020, during his 17th term.

== Background ==
As established by the Constitution of Georgia, Governor Brian Kemp ordered a special election to fill out the remainder of Lewis's term for September 29, 2020. Since no candidate reached 50% on September 29, there was a special runoff election on December 1. This meant that the runoff election took place four weeks after the regular election for a full two-year term. The runoff winner would thus serve for just one month covering the holiday season.

On July 20, 2020, the state Democratic Party announced that State Senator Nikema Williams would replace Lewis on the November ballot, which she won with over 300,000 votes (85%). Williams did not run in the special election to serve the remainder of Lewis's term.

== Candidates ==
=== Democratic Party ===
==== Advanced to runoff ====
- Robert Michael Franklin Jr., former president of Morehouse College (2007–2012) and professor at Emory University
- Kwanza Hall, former Atlanta City Councilman (2006–2017) and 2017 Atlanta mayoral election candidate

==== Eliminated in blanket primary ====
- Barrington Martin II, educator, 2020 candidate in Georgia's 5th congressional district
- Mable Thomas, state representative and former Atlanta City Councilwoman (1997–2003)
- Keisha Waites, former state representative (2012–2017), 2020 candidate in Georgia's 13th congressional district

==== Declined ====
- Meria Carstarphen, former Superintendent of Atlanta Public Schools (2014–2020)
- Nikema Williams, state senator and chairwoman of the Georgia Democratic Party (opted to run in the general election instead)

=== Libertarian Party ===
==== Eliminated in blanket primary ====
- Chase Oliver, customer service specialist and activist

=== Independent ===
==== Eliminated in blanket primary ====
- Steven Muhammad, community organizer

== General election ==
=== Predictions ===
Source	Ranking	As of
The Cook Political Report	Safe D	August 21, 2020
Inside Elections	Safe D	August 21, 2020
Sabato's Crystal Ball	Safe D	July 23, 2020
Politico	Safe D	July 6, 2020
Daily Kos	Safe D	August 17, 2020
RCP	Safe D	June 9, 2020
Niskanen	Safe D	July 26, 2020

=== Results ===
Georgia's 5th congressional district special election, September 29, 2020
Party	Candidate	Votes	%
Democratic	Kwanza Hall	11,104	31.75%
Democratic	Robert Michael Franklin Jr.	9,987	28.55%
Democratic	Mable Thomas	6,692	19.13%
Democratic	Keisha Waites	4,255	12.17%
Democratic	Barrington Martin II	1,944	5.56%
Libertarian	Chase Oliver	712	2.04%
Independent	Steven Muhammad	282	0.8%
Total votes		34,967	100.00%

=== Runoff ===
2020 Georgia's 5th congressional district special election runoff, December 1, 2020
Party	Candidate	Votes	%
Democratic	Kwanza Hall	13,450	54.27%
Democratic	Robert Michael Franklin Jr.	11,332	45.73%
Total votes		24,782	100.00%
Democratic hold			

== See also ==
- 2020 Georgia (U.S. state) elections
