= 2017 Georgia state elections =

== Federal offices ==
A special election was held in Georgia's 6th congressional district.

== State legislative special elections ==
Ten special elections were held in 2017 for General Assembly seats.

== Local ==
- 2017 Atlanta mayoral election
