= DuBose Porter =

American politician (born 1953)

Chair of the Georgia Democratic Party
- In office August 31, 2013 – January 26, 2019
- Preceded by: Nikema Williams (acting)
- Succeeded by: Nikema Williams

Minority Leader of the Georgia House of Representatives
- In office January 10, 2005 – January 10, 2011
- Preceded by: Glenn Richardson
- Succeeded by: Stacey Abrams

Member of the Georgia House of Representatives
- In office January 10, 1983 – January 10, 2011
- Preceded by: J. Roy Rowland
- Succeeded by: Matt Hatchett
- Constituency: 119th district (1983–1993); 143rd district (1993–2003); 119th district (2003–2005); 143rd district (2005–2011)

Personal details
- Born: October 2, 1953 (age 72) Dublin, Georgia, U.S.
- Political party: Democratic
- Spouse: Carol
- Children: 4
- Education: Davidson College (BA); Samford University (JD)

DuBose Porter (born October 2, 1953) is an American attorney, politician, businessman, and former newspaper publisher who served as chairman of the Democratic Party of Georgia and served as a member of the Georgia House of Representatives from 1982 to 2011. He served as Minority Leader in the House from 2005 to 2011. He was previously Administration Floor Leader for Governor Zell Miller from 1991 through 1992 and ran for governor of Georgia in 2010.

== Early life and education ==
Born in Dublin, Laurens County, Georgia, Porter is the son of Dr. Lester and Katherine D. Porter. Porter earned his Eagle Scout Badge in 1970. He was a co-president of his senior high school class at Dublin High School, where he graduated in 1971. He attended Davidson College in Davidson, North Carolina, where he received a Bachelor of Arts degree in English in 1975.

After college, Porter interned in Washington, D.C., for Georgia Senator Sam Nunn, where he was inspired to attend law school. He earned a Juris Doctor from Cumberland Law School at Samford University.

== Career ==
After law school, Porter returned to his hometown and formed the law firm of Nelson & Porter. In 1982 he decided to run for the Georgia House of Representatives. Elected in 2003, he represented the district until 2011.

In 1987, Porter and Griffin Lovett purchased The Courier Herald, the daily newspaper in Dublin. Porter is chairman of the board of the publishing company and runs the business side of the company daily. In 1998, Porter and Lovett purchased The Soperton News, The Montgomery Monitor, and The Wheeler County Eagle. In 2002, they purchased The Johnson Journal, The Twiggs Times New Era, and The Cochran Journal. In 2004, they purchased The Wilkinson County Post and in 2006 they purchased The Baldwin Bulletin. Porter is the business manager of these nine publications. Since 1987, Porter also has been a stockholder and member of the Board of Directors of the Bank of Dudley.

In 1991 and 1992, he served as Administration Floor Leader in the House of Representatives to Governor Zell Miller. In January 2003, Porter was elected Speaker Pro Tempore of the House of Representatives. Porter is currently in his fourteenth term and serves on the Agriculture & Consumer Affairs, Appropriations, Ethics, and Rules Committees. In January 2005, he was elected Leader of the Democratic Caucus of the House of Representatives.

Porter is a former trustee for the Nature Conservancy of Georgia, former member of board of trustees and board of advisors of the Georgia Trust for Historic Preservation. He is the former president of the Georgia Press Association and of the Georgia Library Trustees Association and served as a member of Governor Zell Miller's Preservation 2000 Committee.

He was a member of the 1985 class of Leadership Georgia. He is a member of the Dublin Rotary Club. He is also a member of the Gridiron Secret Society.

On April 6, 2009, Porter announced his candidacy for governor of Georgia in 2010. He lost the Democratic primary on July 20, 2010, to former Gov. Roy Barnes.

On August 31, 2013, Porter was elected chairman of the Democratic Party of Georgia in a special election to fill the vacancy created when former DPG Chairman Mike Berlon resigned. Porter won 62% in the second round of voting.

On January 31, 2015, Porter was re-elected to serve his first full four-year term as chairman of the Democratic Party of Georgia.

== Personal life ==
DuBose has four sons, also Eagle Scouts, Stephen DuBose Porter, Jr., Guyton McCall Porter, and twins, Asa Shearouse Porter and Inman Lee Porter.

Georgia House of Representatives
Preceded by Glenn Richardson	Minority Leader of the Georgia House of Representatives; 2005–2011	Succeeded by Stacey Abrams
Party political offices
Preceded by Nikema Williams; Acting	Chair of the Georgia Democratic Party; 2013–2019	Succeeded by Nikema Williams
