= Marge Thurman =

US-american politician

Marge Thurman (1929 – May 11, 1982) was an American lawyer and political activist. She served as a member of the Democratic National Committee for Georgia from 1963 to 1972, and as chair of the Democratic Party of Georgia from 1974 to 1982.

Born in Atlanta and having attended Emory University, Thurman earned her master's degree from the Atlanta Law School. In 1956, she joined an all-female law practice in Atlanta and joined the Fulton County Young Democrats, rising within the Young Democrats of Georgia to become the first woman to serve as general counsel for the organization. Governor Carl Sanders appointed Thurman as DNC committeewoman in 1963. In turn, Thurman supported Sanders over Jimmy Carter in the Democratic primary for the 1970 Georgia gubernatorial election. After Carter won the primary and the following election, he moved to appoint a replacement for DNC member. Thurman publicly objected, bringing boxing gloves to a press conference to announce her refusal to vacate the position.

Thurman was appointed as chair of the Democratic Party of Georgia by Governor George Busbee to succeed Charles Kirbo, and was subsequently elected chair by the State Committee of the party in 1978. Thurman presided over the party's first-ever Charter Convention in 1975, which codified policies, outlined new goals, drafted new rules for delegate selection, and loosened the party's relationship with the governor and state government. In 1981, Thurman was elected chair of the Association of State Democratic Chairs.

Thurman was found by her daughter in a comatose state at her home on May 7, 1982 after failing to attend an appointment with her doctor, and died at Crawford W. Long Hospital (now Emory University Hospital Midtown) on May 11. Doctors determined the cause of the coma to Thurman having vomited while sleeping and inhaled fluid into her lungs, which cut off the oxygen supply to parts of her body. Thurman was briefly succeeded by Al Holloway as interim chair, and Bert Lance was elected chair later in the year.
