= Kwanza Hall =

American politician (born 1971)

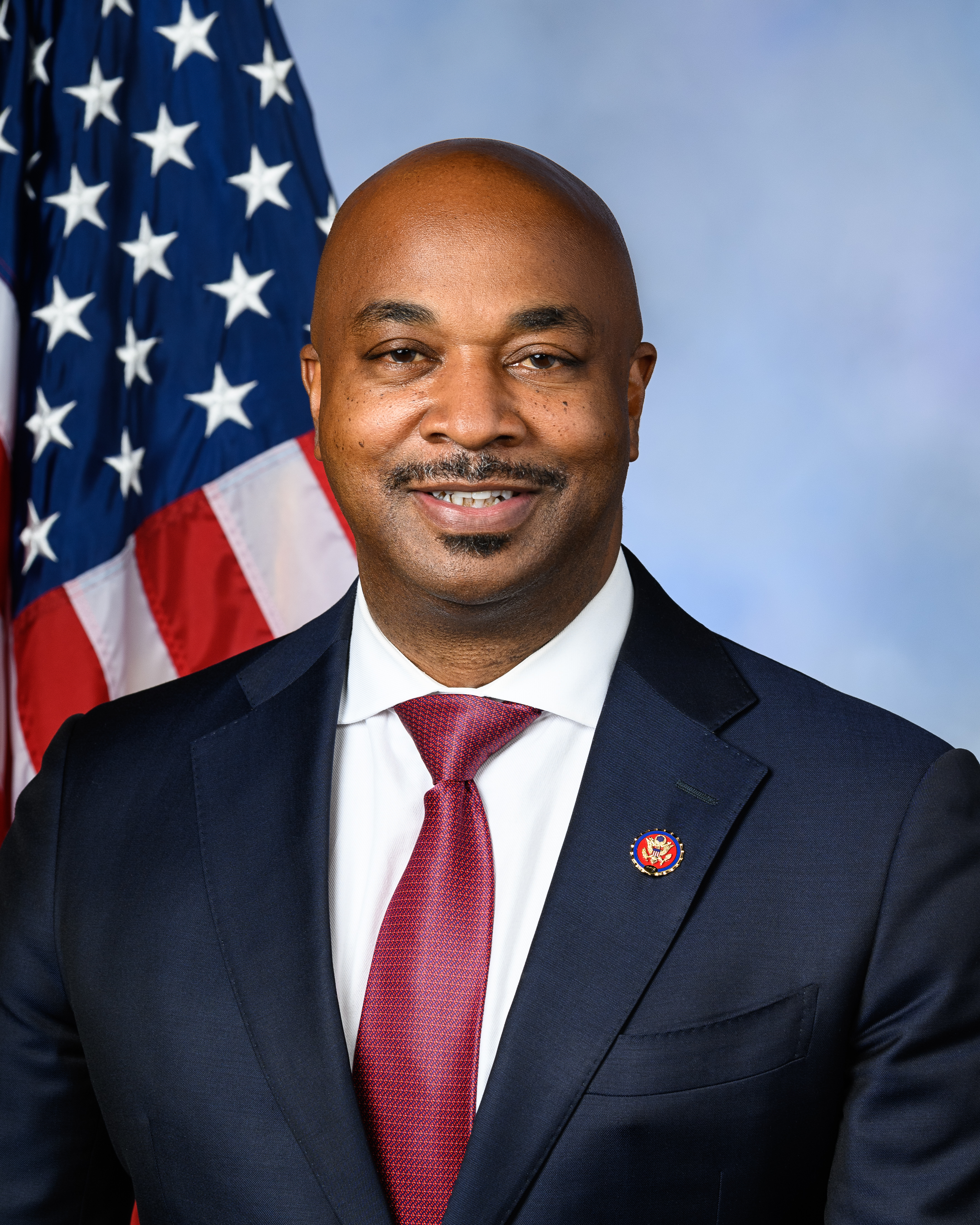
- Official portrait, 2020

Member of the U.S. House of Representatives from Georgia's 5th district
- In office December 1, 2020 – January 3, 2021 (Note: Hall's official service begins on the date of the special election, while he was not sworn in until December 3, 2020.)
- Preceded by: John Lewis
- Succeeded by: Nikema Williams

Member of the Atlanta City Council District 2
- In office January 3, 2006 – 2018
- Preceded by: Debi Starnes
- Succeeded by: Amir Farokhi

Personal details
- Born: May 1, 1971 (age 55) Atlanta, Georgia, U.S.
- Party: Democratic
- Education: Massachusetts Institute of Technology (attended)
- Hall's voice Hall on businesses and issues affecting his district. Recorded December 17, 2020

Kwanza Hall (born May 1, 1971) is an American politician and businessman who briefly served as a member of the United States House of Representatives for Georgia's 5th congressional district. He previously served as a member of the Atlanta City Council for the 2nd district. He was first elected in 2005 (sworn in on January 3, 2006) and re-elected in 2009. He represented the neighborhoods of Atlantic Station, Castleberry Hill, Downtown, Home Park, Inman Park, the Marietta Artery, Sweet Auburn and the Martin Luther King Historic District, Midtown, Poncey-Highland, and the Old Fourth Ward. He opted to not run for re-election in 2017, and was a candidate in the 2017 Atlanta mayoral election.

In the runoff for mayor, he endorsed Keisha Lance Bottoms. In 2018, he was hired as senior political advisor in her administration, violating a city charter provision that bars elected city officials employment for one year after leaving office, followed by the position of director of development for Procter Creek for Invest Atlanta, which also came under scrutiny. He chose to run for Georgia's 5th congressional district in the 2020 special election, following the death of incumbent congressman John Lewis. He finished first in the first round of voting on September 29, but did not receive a majority, and thus the race was decided in a runoff against Robert Michael Franklin on December 1, which Hall won by nearly nine points. Hall was sworn in two days later and served the final month of Lewis's term; Nikema Williams had been chosen by the Georgia Democratic Party to run in the general election in Lewis's stead.

== Early life and education ==
Born and raised in Atlanta, Hall graduated from Benjamin E. Mays High School. Hall attended the Massachusetts Institute of Technology, where he studied political science, but withdrew during his senior year.

== Early career ==
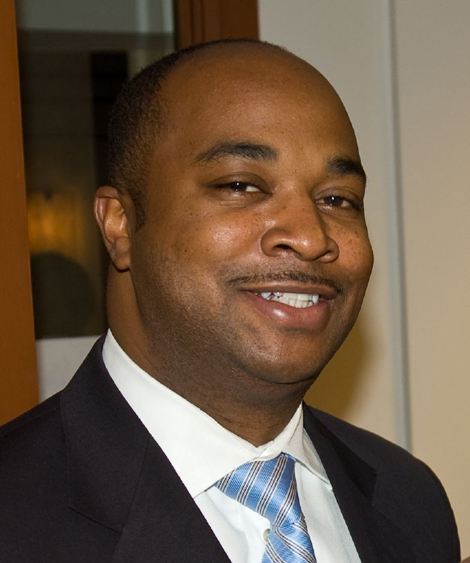
Hall in 2007

Before holding elected office, Hall worked in the Fulton County government and served as vice president of technology for GoodWorks International, a human rights and public service consulting firm co-chaired by Andrew Young. He then became the director of business development for MACTEC Engineering and Consulting, Inc.

In 2002, Hall was elected to the Atlanta Board of Education, where he served for three years prior to his election to the Atlanta City Council. During his time on the Atlanta Board of Education, Hall worked toward closing the achievement gap and contributed to reforms that improved the performance of Atlanta Public Schools on statewide tests.

Hall represented District 2 on the Atlanta City Council, a post he was elected to in 2005. He was re-elected in 2009 and again in 2013. Among the most notable of the initiatives he has been involved in during his tenure is the Atlanta Beltline project. Hall has also focused strongly on community improvement including land use, historical preservation, and sustainable development of in-town neighborhoods.

=== 2017 Atlanta mayoral election ===
Hall filed to run in the 2017 Atlanta mayoral election in January 2017. During the campaign, Hall focused on public safety, transportation, and affordable housing. Hall placed seventh in a field of 12 candidates.

== U.S. House of Representatives ==
=== Election ===
==== 2020 Georgia's 5th district special election ====
After the death of incumbent Congressman John Lewis, Hall announced his candidacy for the September 2020 special election to succeed him. Hall placed first in the September 29, 2020, general election. As no candidate earned 50 percent of votes cast, Hall and the second-place finisher, Robert Michael Franklin Jr., advanced to a December runoff election. He won the runoff election on December 1, 2020.

== After Congress ==
Hall ran for Lieutenant Governor of Georgia in 2022, and placed first in the Democratic primary, but lost the primary runoff to Charlie Bailey. On November 4, 2022, Hall endorsed Republican Governor Brian Kemp for re-election, joining 2 other Democrats in crossing party lines.

== Personal life ==
Hall is divorced and lives in the Martin Luther King Historic District.

== See also ==
- List of African-American United States representatives

U.S. House of Representatives
Preceded by John Lewis	Member of the U.S. House of Representatives from Georgia's 5th congressional district 2020–2021	Succeeded by Nikema Williams
U.S. order of precedence (ceremonial)
Preceded by Kai Kahele as Former U.S. Representative	Order of precedence of the United States as Former U.S. Representative	Succeeded by Eric Massa as Former U.S. Representative
