= Occupy Atlanta =

Protests in Atlanta, Georgia, United States

- Part of the Occupy movement
- Date: October 6, 2011 – 2012
- Location: Atlanta, Georgia
- Caused by: Economic inequality, income inequality, corporate influence over government, unemployment, homelessness, foreclosures
- Methods: Demonstration, occupation, protest, street protesters
- Status: Evicted

Number
- Protesters: ranging from 100 to 1000

Arrests and injuries
- Injuries: 0
- Arrested: 52

Occupy Atlanta has included protests and demonstrations. Occupy Atlanta began on October 6, 2011 in Woodruff Park, located in downtown Atlanta, Georgia. As part of the Occupy movement, it is inspired by Occupy Wall Street which began in New York City on September 17.

As of June 2012, Occupy Atlanta had continued to engage in organized meetings, events and actions.

== Statement of purpose ==
On December 10, 2011, the group adopted the following statement of purpose:

We are Occupy Atlanta. We stand in solidarity with Occupy movements around the world to oppose a system that has disenfranchised the people and has sacrificed the well-being of the many to satisfy the interests of the few. We come together in a nonviolent movement to engage in genuine democracy; to shine a light on the sources of social and economic injustice; to reclaim liberty; and to create a just system that serves the needs of all. We invite you to join us.

== Potential speech by Congressman John Lewis ==
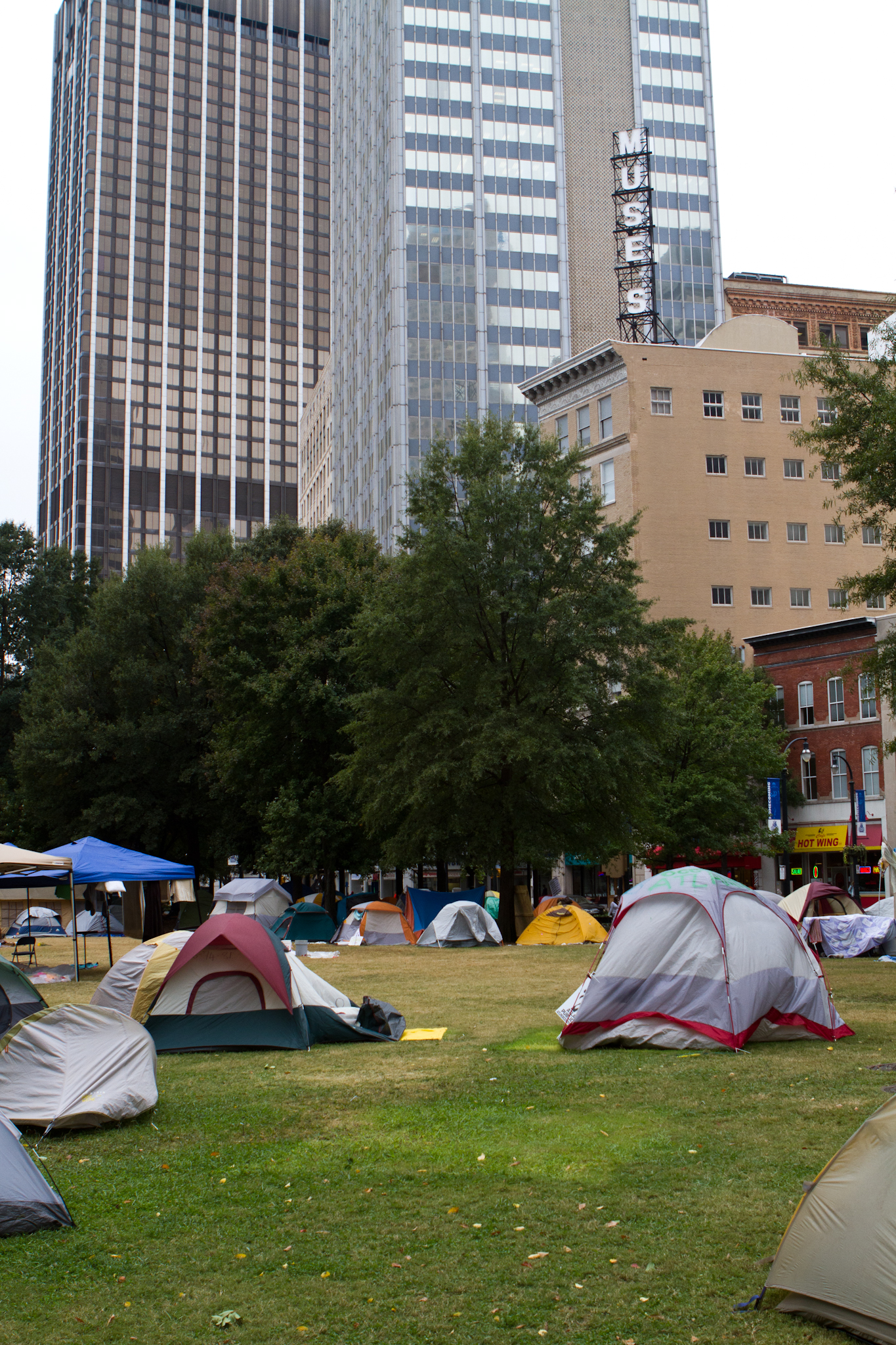
Tents used in the "occupy" protest

On Friday, October 6, 2011, the protestors at Occupy Atlanta did not reach a consensus on allotting time for U.S. Rep. and Civil Rights Movement icon John Lewis to address the crowd. The main argument against allowing Rep. Lewis to speak was that no one person is inherently more valuable than anyone else, and that allowing a speech at that time was not part of that day's agenda. He was invited to speak at time later in the day, during the "other business" part of the process, and this proposition was accepted by the assembly. Lewis was unable to attend because of prior commitments, but indicated that he was not offended by the incident. On October 9, the group posted an apology on its website and invited Lewis to speak. Lewis was not disappointed he wasn't able to address the crowd.

After the incident, Lewis further voiced his support for the movement:

I stand with you. I support you, what you're doing to humanize American corporations, humanize the American government and look out for those who have been left out and left behind.

== Foreclosures ==
On November 7, 2011, Occupy Atlanta protesters camped out in a home in Snellville. It belonged to a police officer, who had contacted Occupy explaining that the house had been foreclosed upon and that he and his family were shortly to be evicted. The protesters left on the 10th after the local sheriff said that the family could be arrested for accessory to trespassing. Occupy Atlanta has stated that they hope this action, and similar ones planned in the future, will bring attention to the foreclosure crisis. A week later, Occupy Cleveland took similar action and succeeded in preventing the eviction of a family from a foreclosed home; the family were given 30 more days.

== Incidents ==
=== 52 Arrests on October 26, 2011 ===
Around 1 AM on Wednesday, October 26, 2011, police blocked off motor vehicle access to Woodruff Park. Mayor Kasim Reed had revoked the executive order he established that allowed the protesters to lawfully stay in the park. Protesters numbering around 120-150 were warned to leave the park or they would be arrested. Reed characterized the situation as a crisis and over 150 officers with 3 helicopters using spotlights the SWAT team, and police on horseback and motorcycles were used. At one point during the arrests, protesters not in the park took over the streets. This is when police brought in their motorcycle police to try to break up the crowd that was forming on the streets. Instead of separating, the crowd of protesters marched towards the oncoming police motorcycles and forced them to turn around and head the other way. Fifty two protesters in the park were arrested. Among the arrested was Georgia state Senator Vincent Fort, who said of Reed, "He's using all these resources. ... This is the most peaceful place in Georgia."

=== Other incidents ===
During the day of Tuesday October 25, "An Associated Press reporter talked to [a] man with the gun slung across his back ... as he walked in the park. He wouldn't give his name, but said he was an out-of-work accountant who doesn't agree with the protesters' views, but was there, armed, because he wanted to protect the rights of people to protest. There's no law that prevents him from carrying the weapon in public, but several police followed him for about 10 minutes before moving off."

== See also ==
Occupy articles

- Timeline of Occupy Wall Street

Other Protests

- 2011 United States public employee protests

Related articles

- Arab Spring
- Corruption Perceptions Index
- Economic inequality
- Grassroots movement
- Income inequality in the United States
- Lobbying
- Plutocracy
- Protest
- Tea Party protests
- Wealth inequality in the United States

Related portals:
