= Vincent Fort =

American politician (1956–2024)

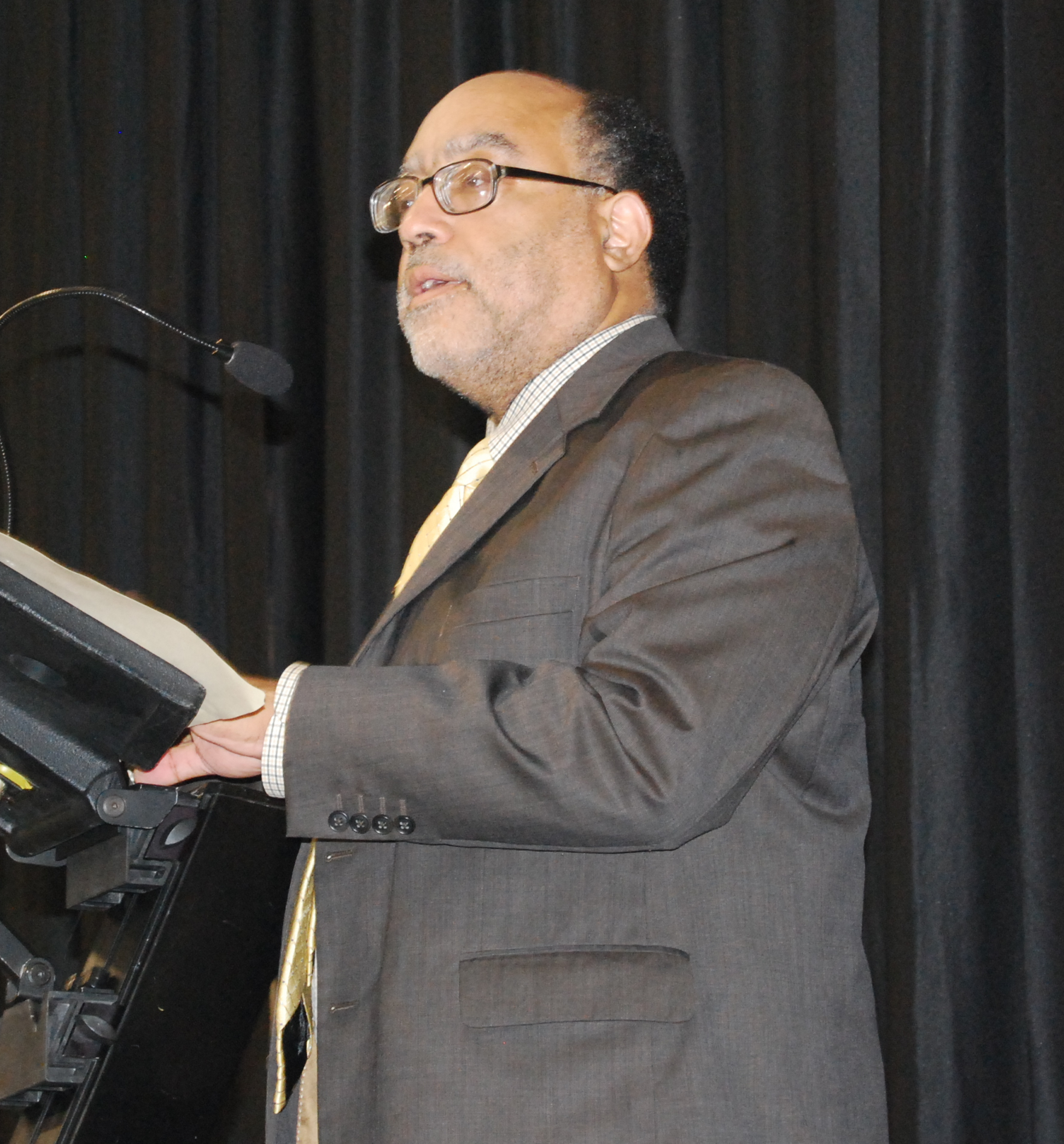
- Fort in 2009

Member of the Georgia Senate from the 39th district
- In office 1996–2017
- Preceded by: Ron Slotin
- Succeeded by: Nikema Williams

Personal details
- Born: April 28, 1956 New Britain, Connecticut, U.S.
- Died: December 22, 2024 (aged 68) Atlanta, Georgia, U.S.
- Party: Democratic
- Children: 3

Vincent Dean Fort (April 28, 1956 – December 22, 2024) was an American politician who served as a member of the Georgia State Senate for the 39th district from 1996 to 2017. He represented part of Fulton County for the 39th district. His district included part of Atlanta and East Point. Fort was an unsuccessful candidate in the 2017 Atlanta mayoral election.

== Early life and education ==
Fort was born in New Britain, Connecticut on April 28, 1956. He received his Bachelor of Arts degree in American history from Central Connecticut State College and a Master of Arts in African-American history from Atlanta University, where he wrote his thesis on an oral history of the sit-in movement during the civil rights era at the Atlanta University Center. He also completed doctoral coursework at Emory University.

== Career ==
Fort was described as a career educator and was previously a professor at Morris Brown College and Morehouse College, two historically black colleges in Atlanta.

=== Georgia State Senate ===
Fort was the first author of Georgia's predatory lending law, which, until watered down by a measure written by Congressman Tom Price, was the strongest law in the country. His legislation to fight predatory lending has been recognized by the national media as a model that could have helped reduce the severity of the 2008 financial crisis, had Georgia Republicans not repealed it and if it had been adopted by more states. He appeared on or been quoted in numerous local, national and international media outlets about the topic, including CNN, Fox News, the New York Times, MSNBC, the Washington Post, Newsweek, The Nation Magazine, the Wall Street Journal, the Los Angeles Times, HDNet with Dan Rather and Financial Times.

He also sponsored and co-sponsored bills against prostitution, hate crimes, drug-related nuisances, discrimination against citizens with disabilities, racial profiling, disabled access to housing, and collective bargaining for law enforcement officers. His hate crimes legislation made him the first Georgia legislator to sponsor a bill to create a state hate crimes law. Fort was described as a supporter of Grady Memorial Hospital.

Fort ran against Balch in the Democratic primary for the state senate in 2010. Fort won the primary with 67% of the vote.

During his tenure in the State Senate, Fort served on committees dealing with the judiciary, education, State institutions and properties, MARTA, appropriations, redistricting and reapportionment.

In February 2010, Fort opposed a bill that would prevent Georgians from being forced to receive a microchip implant against their will, calling it "a solution in search of a problem." On October 26, 2011, he was arrested along with 52 other members of Occupy Atlanta, in support of the protesters. He was also arrested in a protest for Medicaid expansion in Georgia at the office of Governor Nathan Deal. In the aftermath of the 2014 shooting of Michael Brown in Ferguson, Missouri, Fort criticized police militarization in Georgia.

In February 2016, Fort announced he would relinquish his support for Hillary Clinton, instead supporting Bernie Sanders in the 2016 Democratic Party presidential primaries. He issued a statement saying, "After months of looking at Bernie’s record and studying his positions on healthcare, Wall Street, predatory lending and the minimum wage, I came to the conclusion that Bernie’s position on the issues that affect my constituents in Georgia the most conform most closely to my positions." He also cited the ejection of Black Lives Matter protestors from a Hillary Clinton speech at Clark Atlanta University in 2015 as motivation to shy away from the Clinton campaign during the primary. His endorsement of Bernie Sanders for President made Fort the highest-ranking African-American legislator in the South to endorse Sanders.

=== 2017 Atlanta mayoral election ===
As a candidate for mayor of Atlanta, Vincent Fort was endorsed by U.S. Senator Bernie Sanders, former Democratic Governor of Georgia Roy Barnes, Atlanta Hip-Hop artist and business owner Michael Render, also known as Killer Mike, as well as 28 local labor unions. His key campaign issues include affordable housing and stopping gentrification in Atlanta, as well as providing two free years of community and technical college to graduates of Atlanta public schools. Fort's platform had been described as democratic socialist. On September 30, 2017, Bernie Sanders held a rally for Vincent Fort in Saint Philip AME Church in Atlanta's East Lake neighborhood. Fort finished fifth in the November election, receiving 9,310 (10%) of the votes which were cast.

=== 2022 congressional election ===
In January 2022, Fort declared his candidacy for Georgia's 13th congressional district in the 2022 election. Fort came in 4th place out of 4 in the race.

== Personal life and death ==
Fort had a son and two daughters. He died from cancer on December 22, 2024, at the age of 68.
