= Kelsea Bond =

American politician

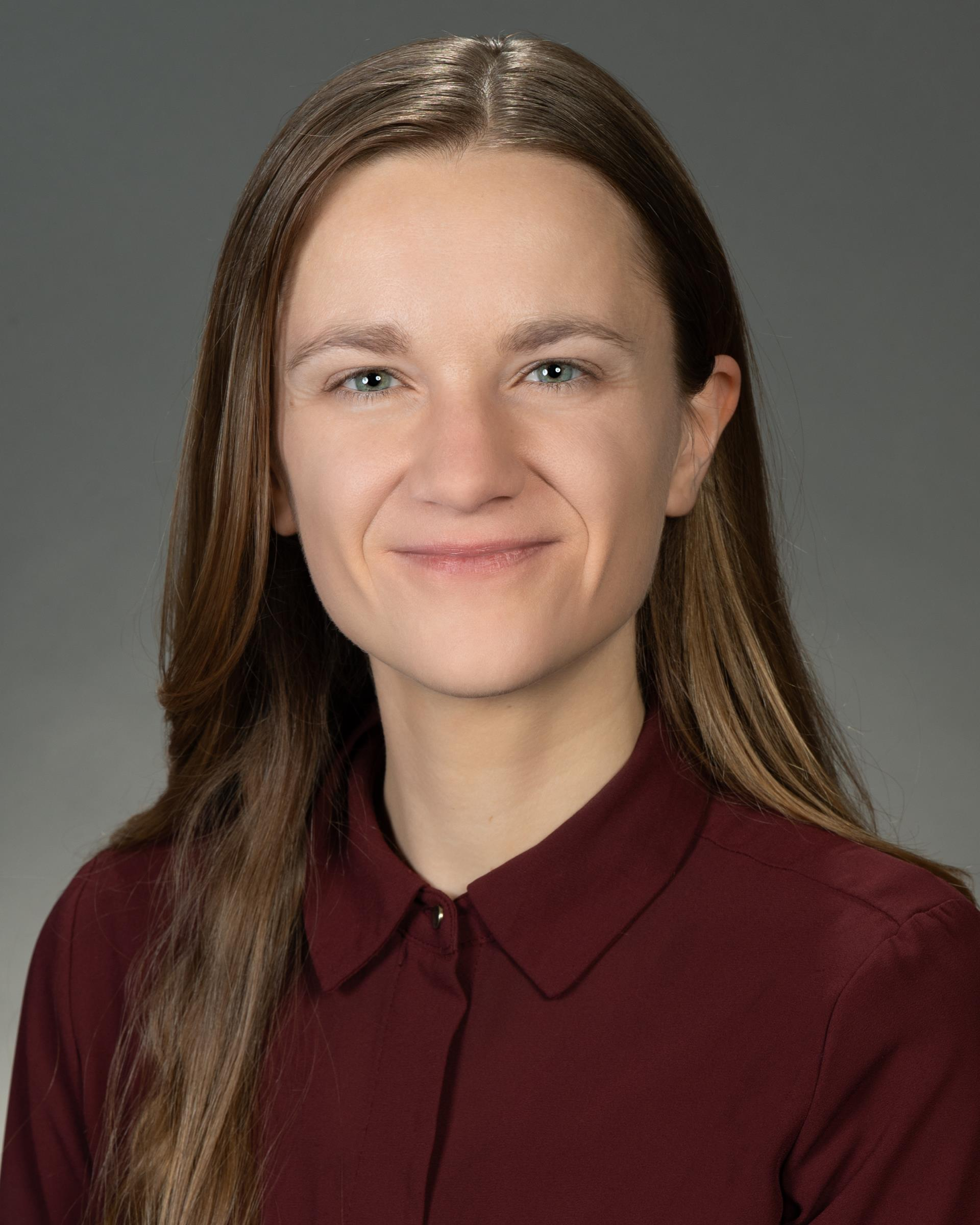
- Official portrait, 2026

Member of the Atlanta City Council from District 2
- Incumbent
- Assumed office January 5, 2026
- Preceded by: Carden Wyckoff

Personal details
- Born: Kelsea A. Bond; 1993 or 1994 (age 32–33) Atlanta, Georgia, U.S.
- Party: Democratic
- Other political affiliations: Democratic Socialists of America
- Education: University of Georgia (BA, 2015); Georgia State University (MA, 2017)
- Occupation: Labor organizer, policy analyst
- Website: City council website Campaign website

Kelsea Bond (born 1993 or 1994) is an American politician and labor organizer serving as a member of the Atlanta City Council representing District 2 since 2026. They (Note: Bond is non-binary and uses they/them pronouns.) are the youngest council member currently serving, the second non-binary individual elected to the body, and the first member of the Democratic Socialists of America (DSA) elected to the Atlanta City Council.

== Early life, education, and early career ==
Bond was born at DeKalb Medical and grew up in DeKalb County, raised in a family of public sector workers and educators; their mother was a teacher and their father worked for the Georgia state government. Their grandfather was a city manager in Macon and Tifton. They graduated from Decatur High School.

Bond attended the University of Georgia, graduating in 2015 with a double major in economics and Romance languages. While studying abroad in Paris, Bond cited their experience with the French healthcare system as influential in their political development and support for public healthcare programs. They subsequently earned a Master of Arts degree in economics from the Andrew Young School of Policy Studies at Georgia State University in 2017.

For several years, Bond worked as a policy and data analyst for the State of Georgia, holding roles within the Governor's Office of Student Achievement and the Technical College System of Georgia. They later worked as a data analyst at Georgia Tech. In 2019, they served on the Georgia Partnership for Adult Education Research advisory board.

== Activism and labor organizing ==
Bond joined the Democratic Socialists of America in 2020. As a union organizer in Metro Atlanta, they assisted Starbucks Workers United in organizing corporate Starbucks stores in Midtown Atlanta in 2022. In 2023, they worked to re-establish the United Campus Workers chapter at Georgia Tech and advocated at the Georgia General Assembly for public sector collective bargaining rights. They have also served on the Atlanta Jobs with Justice Workers' Rights Board.

== Atlanta City Council ==
In 2025, Bond ran for the open District 2 seat on the Atlanta City Council, which encompasses neighborhoods including Midtown, Downtown, the Old Fourth Ward, Inman Park, Poncey-Highland, and Little Five Points. Running on a platform focused on tenant rights, transit expansion, and opposition to the construction of the Atlanta Public Safety Training Center ("Cop City"), Bond won the election on November 4, 2025, securing 64% of the vote in a multi-candidate field. They assumed office on January 5, 2026, and were assigned to the Zoning, Utilities, and Community Development/Human Services committees.

During their first months in office, Bond criticized the city's budget drafting process, stating that public comment sessions occurred after the primary budget text was finalized and arguing for increased community outreach.

On June 15, 2026, Bond was one of two dissenting votes against the adoption of the city's approximately $994.6 million General Fund budget for fiscal year 2027. Bond criticized the budget process as "disheartening and undemocratic," opposing a $16.5 million funding increase to the Atlanta Police Department while the Parks and Recreation budget faced reductions. During the same legislative session, Bond voted against Mayor Andre Dickens' Neighborhood Reinvestment Initiative (NRI), raising concerns over how the legislation utilized affordable housing trust funds prior to formal authorization votes.

== Personal life ==
Bond has resided in Midtown Atlanta since 2016. They identify as queer and non-binary, and live with their cat, Dodo.
