= Robert Michael Franklin Jr. =

American college president

Robert Franklin

10th President of Morehouse College
- In office July 1, 2007 – July 1, 2012
- Preceded by: Walter E. Massey
- Succeeded by: John Silvanus Wilson

Personal details
- Born: February 22, 1954 (age 72) Chicago, Illinois, U.S.
- Party: Democratic
- Spouse: Cheryl Goffney
- Children: 3
- Education: Morehouse College (BA); Harvard University (M.Div.); University of Chicago (Ph.D.)

Robert Michael Franklin Jr. (born February 22, 1954) is an American author, theologian, ordained minister, and academic administrator who served as the tenth president of Morehouse College from 2007 to 2012. Franklin is a visiting scholar in residence at Stanford University's Martin Luther King Jr. Research and Education Institute. In January 2014, he became director of the religion program at the Chautauqua Institution.

== Early life and education ==
A native of Chicago, Franklin graduated from Morgan Park High School. He earned a Bachelor of Arts degree from Morehouse College, Master of Divinity from Harvard Divinity School, and a Ph.D. from the University of Chicago Divinity School. In 1973, he received an English Speaking Union scholarship to study abroad at Durham University during his undergraduate studies. He is also the recipient of honorary degrees from Bethune–Cookman University, Bates College, and Swarthmore College.

== Career ==
Franklin became 10th president of Morehouse College on July 1, 2007. Prior to coming to Morehouse, he was presidential distinguished professor of social ethics at the Candler School of Theology and senior fellow at the Center for the Study of Law and Religion, both at Emory University. Franklin is also former president of the Interdenominational Theological Center in Atlanta. He was a program officer in the Human Rights and Social Justice Program at the Ford Foundation and served as Theologian in Residence for the Chautauqua Institution, both in New York.

=== President of Morehouse College ===
Franklin took office as the 10th president of Morehouse College on July 1, 2007. In 2009, the college received reaffirmation of its accreditation by the Southern Association of Colleges and Schools. In a project initiated by his predecessor, Walter Massey, Franklin oversaw the completion and opening of the $20 million Ray Charles Performing Arts Center and Music Academic Building, a 75,000 square foot facility named after the musician. Franklin led and supported cultivation efforts such as establishing the Renaissance Commission, a group of 150 volunteer stakeholders, that increased the total number of new donors by an average of 1,000 per year. The college generated in excess of $128 million (grants and contracts, private fundraising and federal appropriations) during Franklin's tenure. He relinquished his position as President of Morehouse College in 2012.

=== Civic engagement ===
Franklin is a member of Alpha Phi Alpha fraternity, and the Kappa Boule of Sigma Pi Phi fraternity. He serves on numerous boards, including the Character Education Partnership and Public Broadcasting of Atlanta (WABE radio and television). Franklin is a member of the Council on Foreign Relations; the executive committee of the Metro Atlanta Chamber of Commerce; the Atlanta Symphony Orchestra (executive committee); the CDC Foundation Board of Directors the HBCU Capital Financing Advisory Board; and the Naval War College Board of Advisors.

=== Publications and commentary ===
Franklin is the author of four books, Moral Leadership: Integrity, Courage, Imagination (2020), Crisis in the Village: Restoring Hope in African American Communities (2007), Another Day's Journey: Black Churches Confronting the American Crisis (1997), and Liberating Visions: Human Fulfillment and Social Justice in African American Thought (1989).

Franklin has appeared on the NPR program All Things Considered and provided televised commentary for Atlanta Interfaith Broadcasting.

Franklin worked to produce an official congregational study guide for the 1998 animated film The Prince of Egypt. He also worked as an advisor on the production of The Bible, a History Channel miniseries.

=== 2020 Georgia special election ===
In 2020, Franklin announced his candidacy for 2020 Georgia's 5th congressional district special election to succeed John Lewis. Franklin is a member of the Democratic Party.

Franklin placed second in the September 29, 2020 general election. As no candidate earned 50 percent of votes cast, Franklin and the first-place finisher, Kwanza Hall, advanced to a December runoff election. He lost the election on December 2, 2020.

== Personal life ==
Franklin is married to Cheryl Goffney Franklin, an OB-GYN physician. He has three children and two grandchildren. Franklin holds ordination in two Christian denominations: the American Baptist Churches USA and the Church of God in Christ.
