= Atlanta's 2nd City Council district =

Atlanta's 2nd City Council district is one of the twelve geographic districts in the Atlanta City Council. The current officeholder is Kelsea Bond, who was elected in November 2025.

The district was created in 1973 after a new city charter was passed, which replaced the former at-large six-member Board of Aldermen with a 15-member City Council of 12 districts and 6 (later 3) at-large posts. A previous Second Ward existed in various forms from 1854 to 1954.

== List of aldermen (1854-1954) ==
=== 1854 ===
The original boundaries for five wards were laid out in an unknown fashion and two councilmen from each ward were elected to coincide with the completion of the first official city hall in 1854.

Third Ward councilmen of this period were:

- 1855: T. M. Darnall and C. H. Strong
- 1859: James L. Dunning and William Watkins
- 1860: P. E. McDaniel and James Clarke
- 1865: Frank M. Richardson, B. E. Sasseen
- 1866: P. E. McDaniel, Frank M. Richardson
- 1867: Edward E. Rawson, A. Weldon Mitchell

=== 1935 ===
==== Councilmembers ====
- Joe Allen
- R. E. Lee Field

== List of councilors (1974–present) ==
- Charles Helms (1974–1978)
- John Sweet (1978–1982)
- Bill Campbell (1982–1994)
- Debi Starnes (1994–2005)
- Kwanza Hall (2005–2017)
- Amir Farokhi (2017–2025)
- Carden Wyckoff (2025 – January 5, 2026)
- Kelsea Bond (January 5, 2026 – present)
