= Allen Fort =

American judge, railroad commissioner and politician

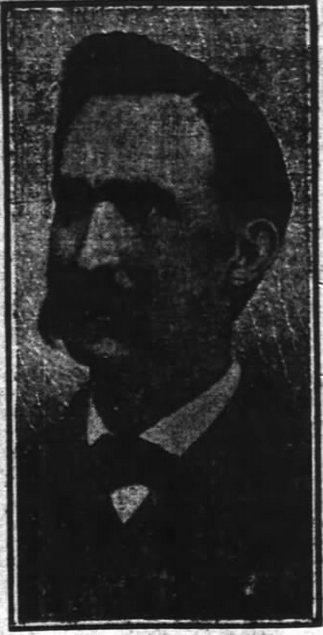
Judge Allen Fort

Allen Fort (July 14, 1849 - April 20, 1907) was a judge, railroad commission founder and member, and state legislator in Georgia.

== Biography ==
Fort was born near Lumpkin, Georgia July 14, 1849. He received a first class honors degree from the University of Georgia in 1867. While at the university he was the co-founder of the local chapter of Sigma Alpha Epsilon. After he obtained his degree he went to Americus and was admitted to the bar.

He was a delegate to the State Democratic Convention in June 1872 representing Sumter County. Later the same year he was elected to the Georgia House of Representatives to represent Sumter County as a Democrat. He was re-elected to the legislature several times including to the Georgia Senate.

Fort was made judge of the southwestern circuit in 1882 and was the youngest member of the bench. He made a run for congress in 1896 to fill the vacated seat of Charles R. Crisp but was defeated by Elijah B. Lewis. He served as circuit judge until 1991 when he left to become a railroad commissioner.

He had eight children, including Hollis Fort, who was also a Sumter County lawyer and state legislator.

Fort died April 20, 1907, from pneumonia at his home in Americus. He was survived by his wife and six children. He was buried in Oak Grove cemetery.
