= 2014 Georgia Attorney General election =

- November 4, 2014
- Turnout: 42.25%
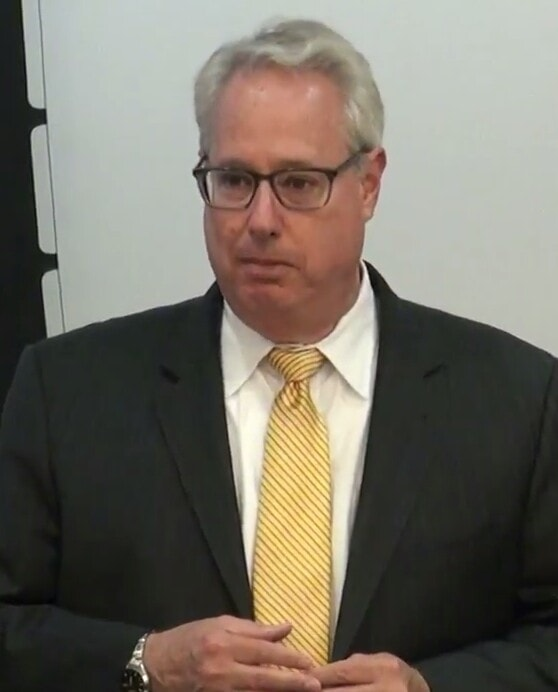

Nominee	Sam Olens	Greg Hecht
Party	Republican	Democratic
Popular vote	1,436,987	1,087,268
Percentage	56.93%	43.07%
- County results Olens: 50–60% 60–70% 70–80% 80–90% Hecht: 50–60% 60–70% 70–80% 80–90%
Attorney General before election
Sam Olens
Republican
Elected Attorney General
Sam Olens
Republican

The 2014 Georgia Attorney General election took place on November 4, 2014, to elect the Attorney General of Georgia. Incumbent Republican Attorney General Sam Olens ran for a second term and won, defeating former Democratic state senator Greg Hecht with 56.93% of the vote.

== Republican primary ==
=== Candidates ===
==== Nominee ====
- Sam Olens, incumbent attorney general

=== Results ===
Republican primary results
Party	Candidate	Votes	%
Republican	Sam Olens (incumbent)	Unopposed	
Total votes		—N/a	100.0

== Democratic primary ==
=== Candidates ===
==== Nominee ====
- Greg Hecht, former state senator

=== Results ===
Democratic primary results
Party	Candidate	Votes	%
Democratic	Greg Hecht	Unopposed	
Total votes		—N/a	100.0

== General election ==
=== Polling ===
Poll source	Date(s) administered	Sample size	Margin of error	Sam Olens (R)	Greg Hecht (D)	Undecided
Public Policy Polling	November 1–3, 2014	975	± 3.1%	51%	37%	12%
SurveyUSA	October 30 – November 2, 2014	591	± 4.1%	51%	39%	9%
SurveyUSA	October 24–27, 2014	611	± 4%	48%	43%	10%
Landmark Communications	October 20–21, 2014	1,000	± 2.75%	52%	44%	4%
SurveyUSA	October 10–13, 2014	563	± 4.2%	46%	43%	11%
Landmark Communications	October 7–9, 2014	1,000	± 3.1%	50%	44%	7%
SurveyUSA	October 2–6, 2014	566	± 4.2%	46%	39%	15%
Public Policy Polling	October 2–5, 2014	895	± 3.3%	45%	36%	19%
SurveyUSA	September 19–22, 2014	550	± 4.3%	48%	41%	12%
SurveyUSA	September 5–8, 2014	558	± 4.2%	49%	41%	10%
SurveyUSA	August 14–17, 2014	560	± 4.2%	49%	36%	15%

=== Results ===
2014 Georgia Attorney General election
Party	Candidate	Votes	%
Republican	Sam Olens (incumbent)	1,436,987	56.93%
Democratic	Greg Hecht	1,087,268	43.07%
Total votes		2,524,255	100.00%
Republican hold			

== See also ==
- Georgia Attorney General
