= 2020–21 United States Senate runoff in Georgia =

The 2020–21 Georgia U.S. Senate runoff may refer to:

- 2020 United States Senate election in Georgia, a runoff election for the regularly scheduled November election to fill the Class II Georgia U.S. Senate seat
- 2020 United States Senate special election in Georgia, a runoff election for the remaining two years of Johnny Isakson's term for the Class III Georgia U.S. Senate seat, to January 2023.
