= Michael Coles (businessman) =

American entrepreneur, author, philanthropist, and politician

Michael J. Coles is an American entrepreneur, author, philanthropist, and politician. Coles was the co-founder of Great American Cookie Company and former CEO of Caribou Coffee. Coles was the 1996 Democratic nominee for the house of representatives in the Sixth District of Georgia, and the 1998 Democratic nominee for U.S. senate. In 1994 Kennesaw State University named its school of business the Coles College of Business.

== Career ==
In 1977, with co-founder Arthur Karp, Coles opened the first Great American Cookie Company location at Perimeter Mall with an investment of $8,000. From there, the company expanded and became a chain in the United States. In 1988, Coles sold the Great American Cookie company for $100 million.

Coles ran as a Democrat for US Congress in 1996, against incumbent congressman Newt Gingrich. The two opponents spent a total of $8.9 million dollars on their campaigns, with Gingrich emerging as the winner.

In 1998, Coles ran for US Senate as a Democratic candidate. He defeated his opponent in the primary, but lost the general election.

In 1999, after being appointed by Governor Roy Barnes, Coles became the chair of the Georgia Film, Video and Music Advisory Board. He served as chairman for four years.

Coles joined Caribou Coffee as its CEO in 2003. During his tenure he oversaw an initial public offering of the company's stock. He stepped down from the position in 2007 following the decline of the company's share price.

== Philanthropy ==
Coles joined Kennesaw State University's board of trustees in 1990. In 1994, after a donation from his Coles-Novak Family Foundation, the business school was renamed the Michael J. Coles School of Business (now College of Business).

== Personal life ==
In 1977 Coles had a serious motorcycle accident. Told he would not walk again, he recovered doing cycling as physiotherapy.

== Books ==
- Time to get Tough, 2018.

Party political offices
Preceded by Wyche Fowler	Democratic Party nominee for United States Senator from Georgia (Class 3); 1998	Succeeded by Zell Miller
