= Charles Kirbo =

American lawyer

Chair of the Democratic Party of Georgia
- In office 1972–1974
- Preceded by: David H. Gambrell
- Succeeded by: Marge Thurman

Personal details
- Born: March 5, 1917 Bainbridge, Georgia, U.S.
- Died: September 2, 1996 (aged 79) Atlanta, Georgia, U.S.
- Party: Democratic
- Education: University of Georgia (LLB)

Charles Hughes Kirbo (March 5, 1917 – September 2, 1996) was an American lawyer and longtime advisor to Jimmy Carter. He served as the chairman of the Democratic Party in Georgia for two years from 1972 to 1974.

== Early life and legal career ==
Kirbo was born on March 5, 1917, in Bainbridge, Georgia. He graduated from the University of Georgia School of Law in 1939 and later served in the United States Army in World War II. In 1960, Kirbo became a partner in the law firm of King & Spalding.

== Political career ==
Kirbo first represented Jimmy Carter in 1962 when Carter lost the Democratic primary for a Georgia state senate seat. After Kirbo was able to establish that the primary results were fraudulent, Carter won the nomination and then the general election. In 1971, then-Governor Jimmy Carter offered to appoint Kirbo to the United States Senate seat left vacant by the death of Richard Russell, but Kirbo declined. When Carter was elected President, Kirbo was considered as a possible White House Chief of Staff. Kirbo was also considered to be a candidate for the Supreme Court if a vacancy had occurred under a Carter Presidency.

== Death ==
Kirbo died on September 2, 1996, in Atlanta of complications from gall bladder surgery.
