= 1998 United States Senate election in Georgia =

- November 3, 1998
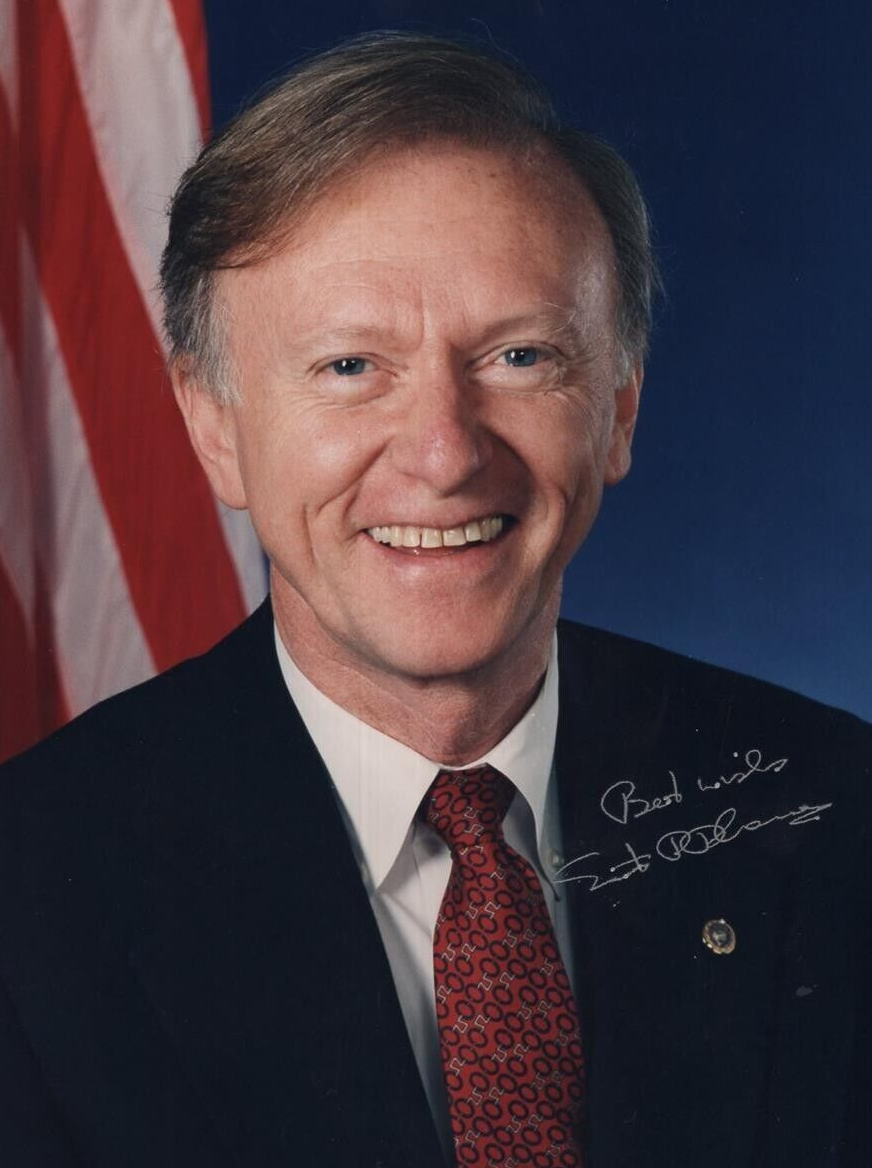

Nominee	Paul Coverdell	Michael Coles
Party	Republican	Democratic
Popular vote	918,540	791,904
Percentage	52.37%	45.15%
- County results Coverdell: 40–50% 50–60% 60–70% 70–80% Coles: 40–50% 50–60% 60–70% 70–80%
U.S. senator before election
Paul Coverdell
Republican
Elected U.S. Senator
Paul Coverdell
Republican

The 1998 United States Senate election in Georgia was held November 3, 1998. Incumbent Republican U.S. Senator Paul Coverdell won a second term in office, becoming the first of his party to ever win reelection to the U.S. Senate from Georgia. Coverdell would remain in the Senate until his death on July 18, 2000.

== Democratic primary ==
=== Candidates ===
- Jimmy Allen Boyd, businessman
- Michael Coles, co-founder of Great American Cookies and 1996 nominee for U.S. representative

=== Results ===
Democratic primary results
Party	Candidate	Votes	%
Democratic	Michael Coles	312,765	76.14%
Democratic	Jimmy Allen Boyd	98,020	23.86%
Total votes		410,785	100.00%

== General election ==
=== Candidates ===
- Michael Coles, co-founder of Great American Cookies and 1996 nominee for U.S. representative (Democratic)
- Paul Coverdell, incumbent U.S. senator since 1993 (Republican)
- Daniel Fein (Socialist Workers) (write-in)
- Bert Loftman (Libertarian)

=== Polling ===
Poll source	Date(s) administered	Sample size (Note: Key: A – all adults RV – registered voters LV – likely voters V – unclear)	Margin of error	Paul Coverdell (R)	Michael Coles (D)	Other / undecided (Note: Calculated by taking the difference of 100% and all other candidates combined.)
Harris Insights & Analytics	October 30, 1998	1,408	—	56%	38%	6%
Mason-Dixon Polling & Strategy	October 26–28, 1998	809 (LV)	± 3.5%	51%	38%	11%
Marketing Workshop	October 26, 1998	709	—	53%	35%	12%
Harris Insights & Analytics	October 20, 1998	1,174	—	53%	37%	10%
University of Georgia	October 15, 1998	500	—	46%	29%	25%
Mason-Dixon Polling & Strategy	October 5–6, 1998	807 (LV)	± 3.5%	52%	36%	12%
Marketing Workshop (Note: Poll sponsored by The Atlanta Journal-Constitution and WSB-TV2)	September 26–29, 1998	690 (RV)	± 3.7%	55%	33%	12%
Mason-Dixon Polling & Strategy	September 5–8, 1998	829 (LV)	± 3.5%	50%	37%	13%
Mason-Dixon Polling & Strategy	June 20–23, 1998	807 (LV)	± 3.5%	47%	36%	17%

=== Results ===
Georgia United States Senate election, 1998
Party	Candidate	Votes	%	±%
Republican	Paul Coverdell (incumbent)	918,540	52.37%	▲1.72
Democratic	Michael Coles	791,904	45.15%	▼4.20
Libertarian	Bert Loftman	43,467	2.48%	▼0.62
Socialist Workers	Daniel Fein (write-in)	42	0.00%	N/A
Majority		126,636	7.22%	
Total votes		1,753,953	100.00%	(Note: The percentage change for the Republican and Democratic candidates are relative to the run-off in the 1992 election, while changes for the Libertarian candidate are relative to the first round in the 1992 election.)
Republican hold				

== See also ==
- 1998 United States Senate elections

== Notes ==
Partisan clients
