= Mike Berlon =

American politician

Mike Berlon is the former chairman of the Democratic Party of Georgia. He served from early 2011 until June 9, 2013, when he resigned following accusations of professional misconduct. On February 25, 2015 Berlon pleaded guilty to one charge of wire fraud in Federal court.

== Political career ==
In January 2011, Berlon was elected as the chairman of the Democratic Party of Georgia. During his tenure he emphasized a grassroots strategy to make the Democratic Party more competitive outside of the Atlanta metro area and a progressive platform including job creation, increased pay for teachers and educators, and increased funding of public schools.

On May 29, 2013, the Democratic Party of Georgia released a statement saying Berlon would resign his chairmanship, after Atlanta Mayor Kasim Reed called for him to step down. In a subsequent statement released to the media, Berlon announced his resignation from the state party would be effective midnight on June 9, 2013.

== Stance on party-switchers ==
Berlon has also been a strong critic of elected Democrats that switch to the Republican Party. During his tenure, several Democrats switched parties to take advantage of the state's Republican-lean, most notably State House Caucus Chair Doug McKillip, and State Representative Rick Crawford (who stated his intention to switch immediately after his re-election campaign). The Democratic Party of Georgia unsuccessfully attempted to remove Crawford from the ballot.

All three party-switchers lost in their next election.

== Federal fraud conviction ==
After an investigation by the Federal Bureau of Investigation, Berlon pleaded guilty to one count of wire fraud and was sentenced on February 25, 2015, to 5 years and 3 months in federal prison and 3 years of supervised release for stealing over $2 million from his clients. He also agreed to pay over $2 million in restitution.
