= 2017 Atlanta mayoral election =

- November 7, 2017 (general) December 5, 2017 (runoff)
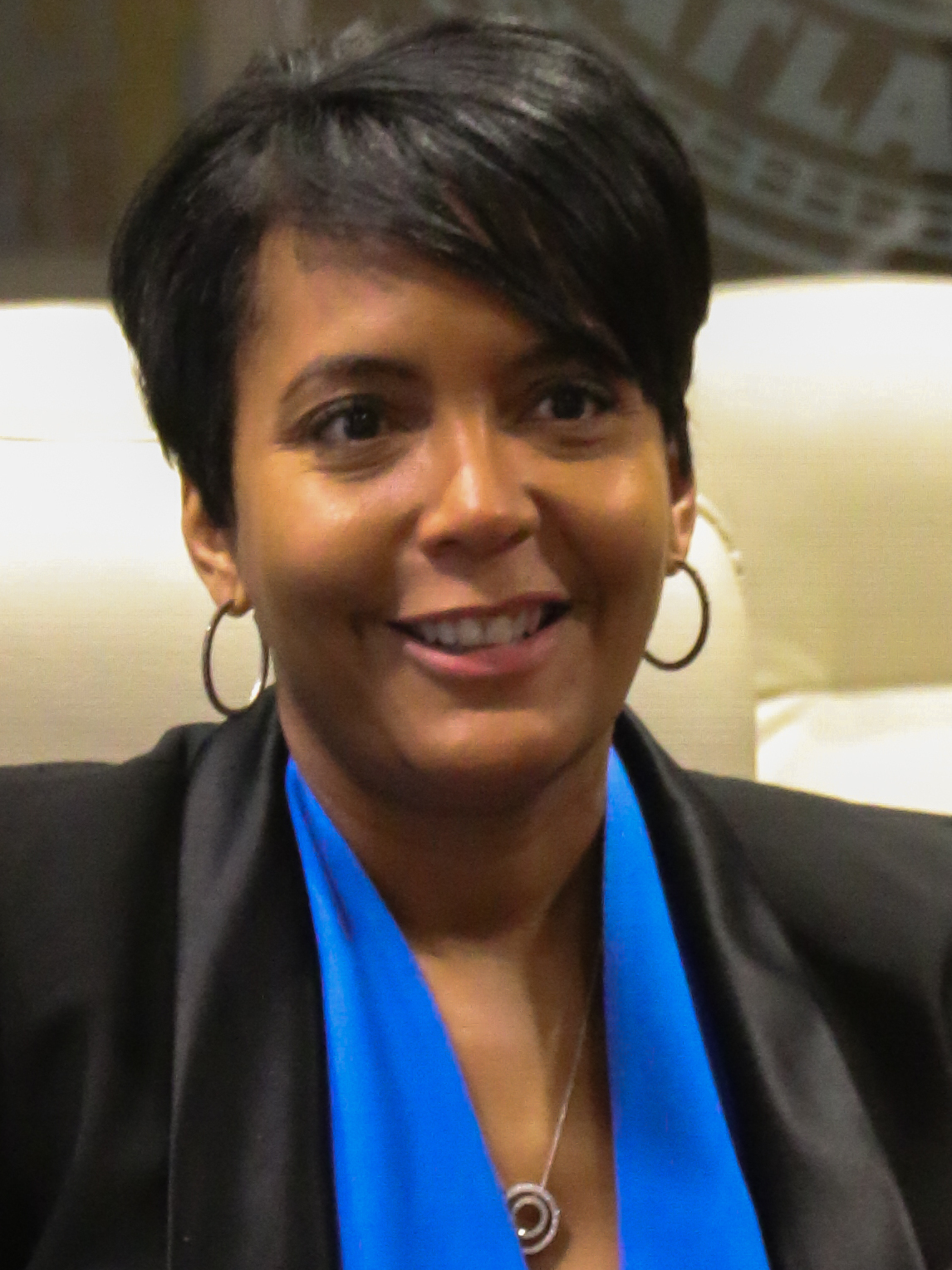

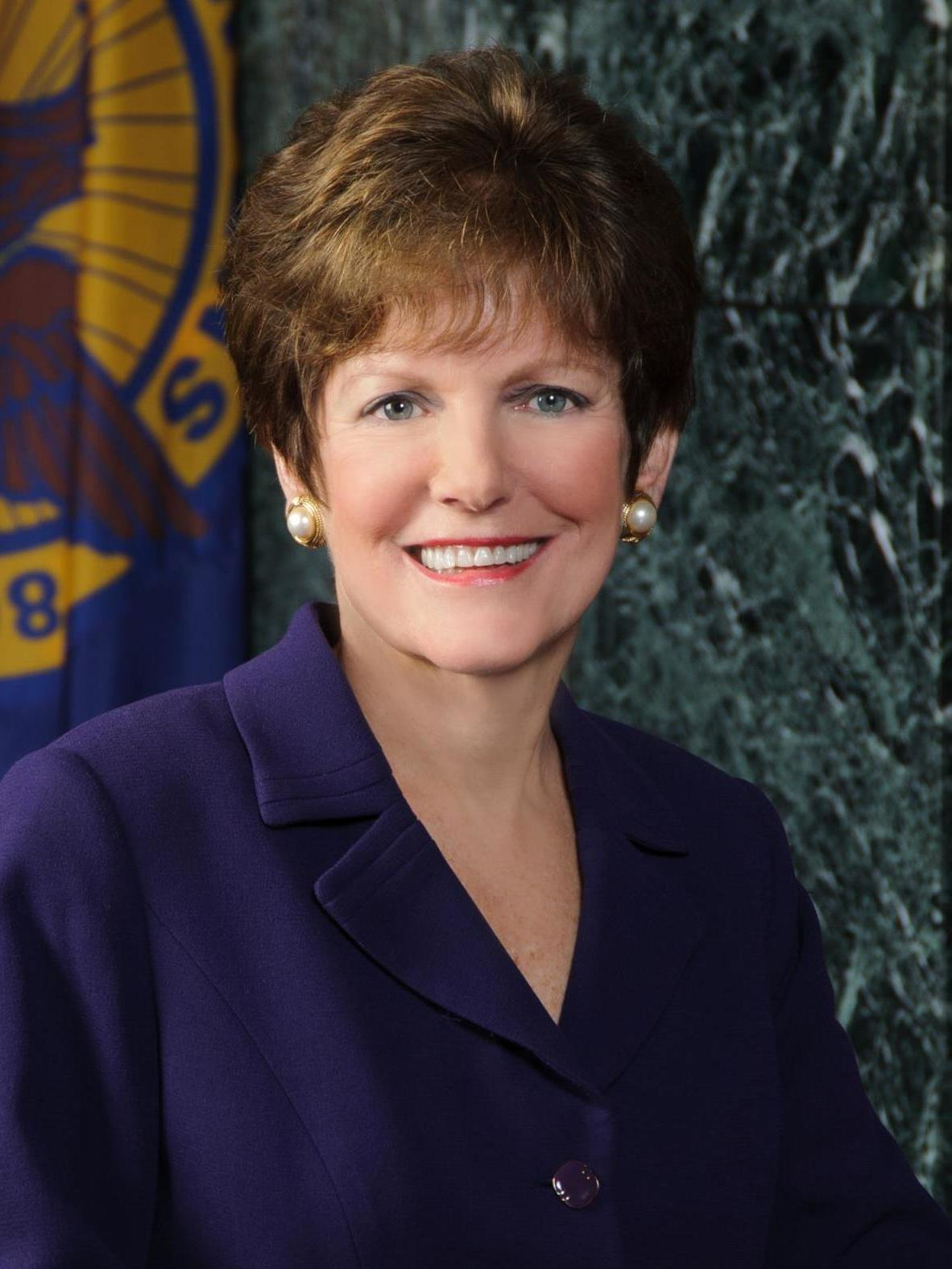

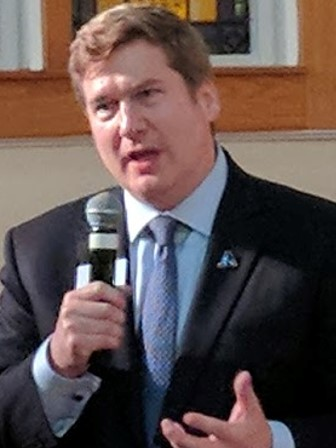

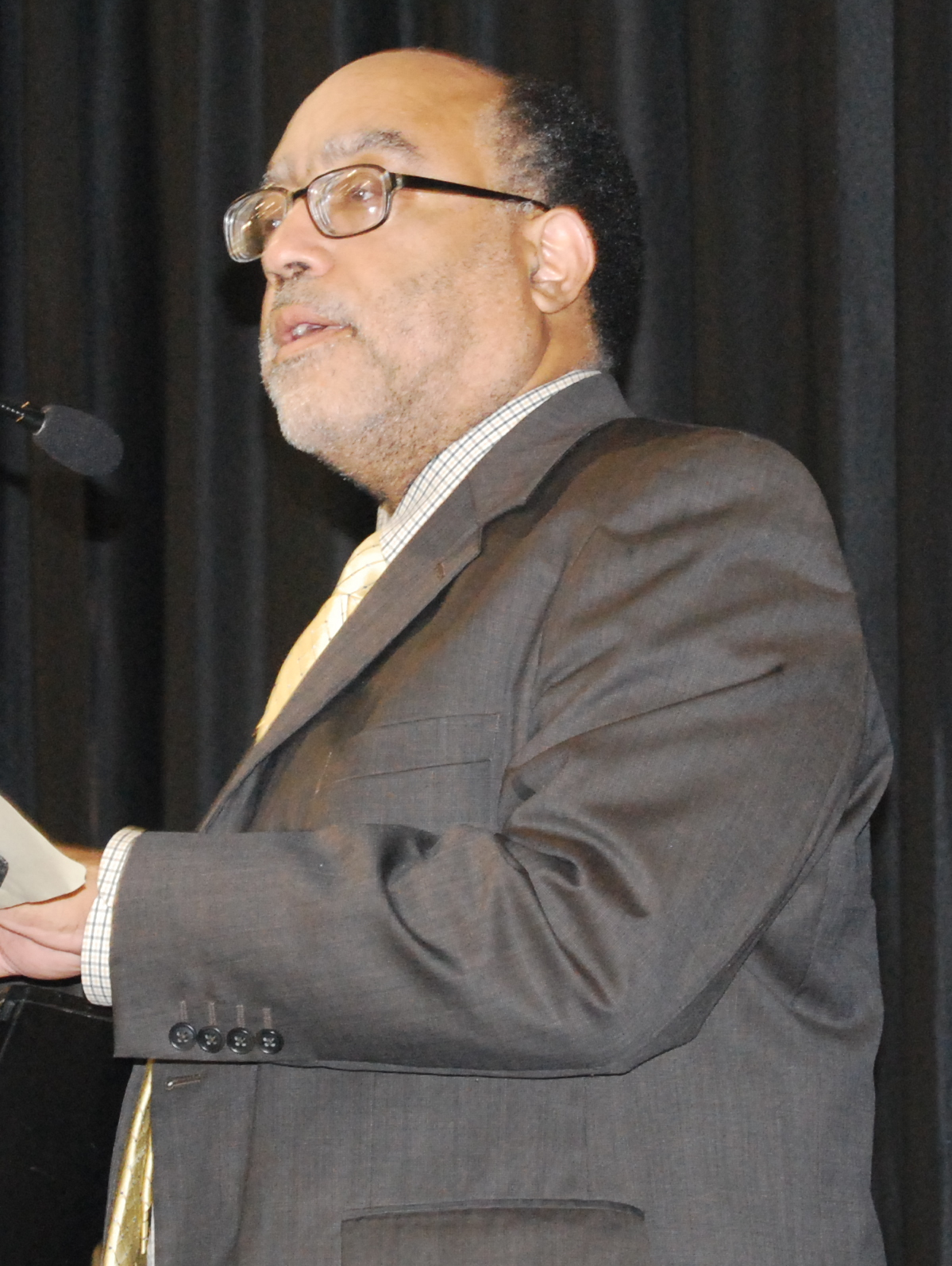

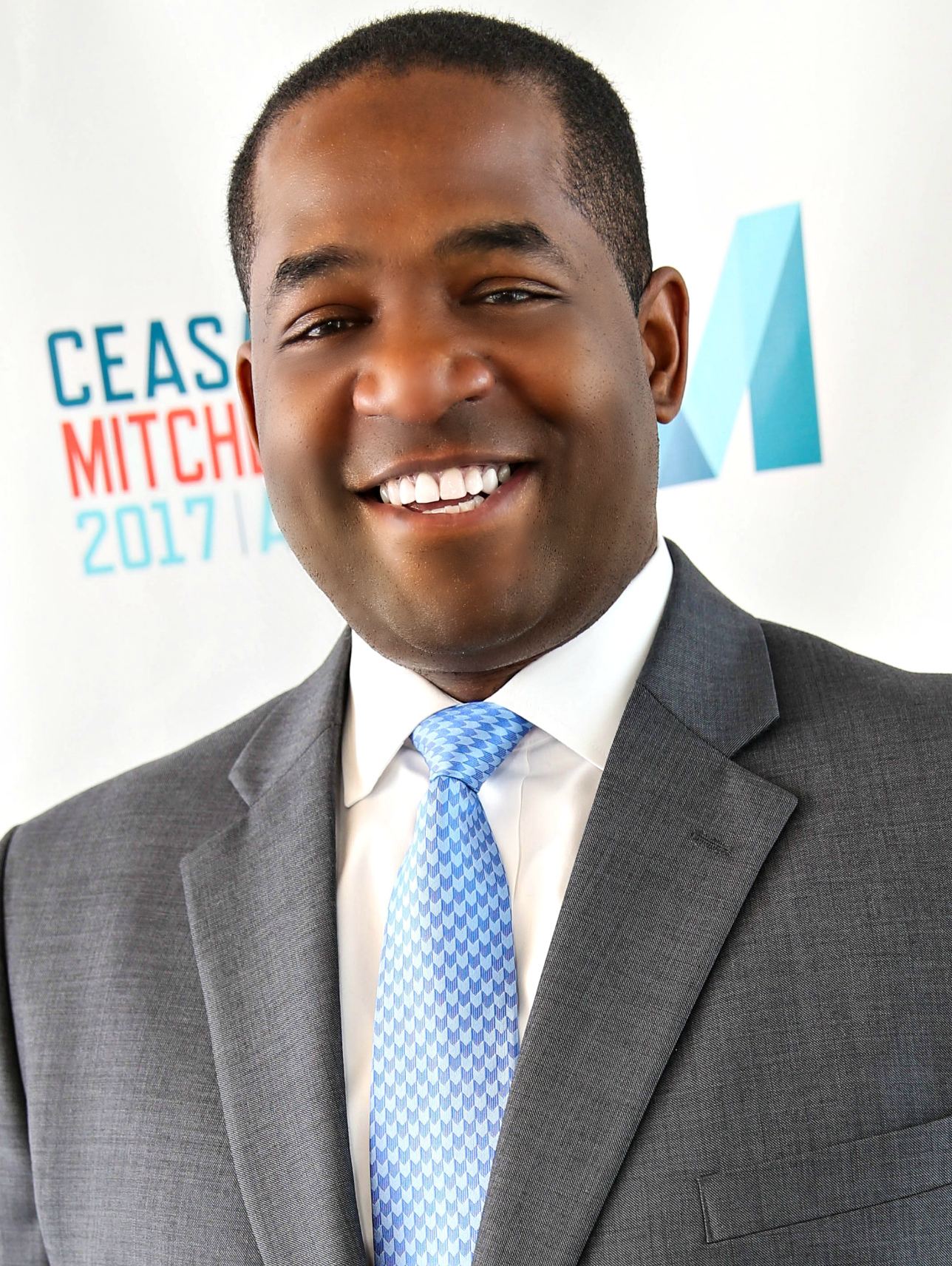
Candidate	Keisha Lance Bottoms	Mary Norwood	Cathy Woolard
Party	Nonpartisan	Nonpartisan	Nonpartisan
First round	25,347; 26.19%	20,144; 20.81%	16,134; 16.67%
Runoff	46,464; 50.41%	45,705; 49.59%	Eliminated
Candidate	Peter Aman	Vincent Fort	Ceasar Mitchell
Party	Nonpartisan	Nonpartisan	Nonpartisan
First round	10,924; 11.29%	9,310; 9.62%	9,124; 9.43%
Runoff	Eliminated	Eliminated	Eliminated
- Runoff precinct results Bottoms: 50–60% 60–70% 70–80% 80–90% >90% Norwood: 50–60% 60–70% 70–80% 80–90% >90% No data
Mayor before election
Kasim Reed
Democratic
Elected mayor
Keisha Lance Bottoms
Democratic

The 2017 Atlanta mayoral election occurred on November 7, 2017, with a runoff election held on December 5, 2017. Incumbent mayor Kasim Reed, a member of the Democratic Party who had been in office since 2010, was ineligible to run for reelection due to term limits.

A total of 14 candidates qualified for the November 7 non-partisan election. However, no candidate revived a majority, so a runoff was held between Keisha Lance Bottoms and Mary Norwood, the top two finishers, on December 5. On election night, unofficial results suggested that Keisha Lance Bottoms had narrowly won, but Norwood called for a recount.

The election was first certified on December 11, 2017, and had Bottoms winning by a margin of 823 votes. This margin was less than the 1 percent threshold needed to avoid a mandatory recount. The recount, which occurred on December 14, resulted in Norwood gaining five votes and Bottoms losing six in Fulton County, while the vote totals in DeKalb County remained the same. The election was re-certified on December 17 after Fulton County accepted the new results. Norwood officially conceded the race on December 21, and Lance Bottoms was inaugurated as the 60th mayor of Atlanta on January 2, 2018.

== Candidates ==
=== Declared ===
- Peter Aman, former chief operating officer of Atlanta
- Rohit Ammanamanchi, Georgia Institute of Technology graduate
- John Eaves, Fulton County chairman, District 7, at-large
- Vincent Fort, Georgia state senator
- Kwanza Hall, Atlanta City councilmember (District 2)
- Laban King, co-founder of the real estate investment firm, Millennial Global Investments
- Keisha Lance Bottoms, Atlanta City councilmember (District 11)
- Ceasar Mitchell, Atlanta City Council president
- Mary Norwood, Atlanta City councilmember (Post 2, at-large) and candidate for mayor in 2009
- Cathy Woolard, former Atlanta City Council president
- Glenn Wrightson

=== Failed to qualify ===
- Alex Barrella, cartoonist

=== Dropped out ===
- Al Bartell, certified mediator; dropped out August 22, 2017
- Margaret Kaiser, Georgia state representative, District 59, 2007–2016; dropped out October 25, 2016
- Michael Sterling, former executive director of the City of Atlanta Workforce Development Agency; dropped out October 24, 2017

== Endorsements ==
Peter Aman

Atlanta City Council members

- Yolanda Adrean, Atlanta City councilwoman, District 8
- Clair Muller, former Atlanta City councilwoman

Organizations

- Ranked Number 1 by the Committee For A Better Atlanta
Keisha Lance Bottoms

Atlanta politicians

- Michael Julian Bond, Atlanta City Councilman (District 3)
- Kwanza Hall, Atlanta City councilman (District 2); candidate for mayor of Atlanta in 2017 (endorsed during runoff campaign)

Statewide politicians

- Jon Ossoff, Democratic nominee for GA-06 in 2017

Organizations

- Southern Carpenters Regional Council

Celebrities

- Killer Mike (endorsed during runoff campaign)
- T.I.
Vincent Fort

Federal politicians

- Bernie Sanders, senator from Vermont and 2016 presidential candidate

Statewide politicians

- Roy Barnes, former governor of Georgia
- Steve Henson, Democratic Senate leader

Organizations

- Atlanta Progressive News
- Georgia State Building Trades Council
- North Georgia Building Trades Council
- Our Revolution

Newspapers

- Atlanta Black Star

Labor unions

- American Federation of Government Employees Locals 554, 1568, 2778
- American Postal Workers Local 32
- Bakery, Confectionery, Tobacco Workers and Grain Millers Local 42
- Communication Workers of America Local 3204
- Georgia Federation of Teachers
- Laborers Local 515
- Mail Handlers Local 310
- Painters District 77, Local 193
- Teamsters Locals 728, 527, 528
- United Auto Workers Region 8, Locals 10 and 882

Individuals

- Killer Mike
Ceasar Mitchell

Organizations

- Georgia Log Cabin Republicans

Labor unions

- UFCW Local 1996 - United Food and Commercial Workers

Former candidates

- Michael Sterling, former executive director of the City of Atlanta Workforce Development Agency
Mary Norwood

Atlanta politicians

- Peter Aman, former chief operating officer of Atlanta (endorsed during runoff campaign)
- Lisa Borders, former Atlanta City Council president
- Shirley Franklin, former mayor of Atlanta
- Ceasar Mitchell, Atlanta City Council president (endorsed during runoff campaign)
- Cathy Woolard, former Atlanta City Council president (endorsed during runoff campaign)

Labor unions

- IAFF Local 134 - International Association of Fire Fighters
- IBPO Local 623 - International Brotherhood of Police Officers
- Police Benevolent Association of Georgia

Organizations

- Buckhead Coalition
- Georgia Log Cabin Republicans

== Polling ==
Poll source	Date(s) administered	Sample size	Margin of error	Peter Aman	Keisha Lance Bottoms	John Eaves	Vincent Fort	Kwanza Hall	Ceasar Mitchell	Mary Norwood	Cathy Woolard	Other	Undecided
WSB-TV/Landmark	November 3, 2017	750	± 3.6%	12.0%	25.4%	2.6%	7.9%	5.2%	6.8%	23.4%	9.2%	1.9%	5.6%
WSB-TV/Landmark	October 7, 2017	750	± 3.6%	12.6%	19.2%	3.1%	6.2%	4.7%	5.8%	22.1%	6.3%	1.8%	18.2%
WXIA-TV Atlanta/SurveyUSA	September 26–30, 2017	549	± 4.3%	7%	15%	2%	7%	7%	10%	28%	7%	2%	14%
WSB-TV/Landmark	August 27, 2017	500	± 4.4%	12.1%	12.4%	3.6%	6.1%	5.2%	10.4%	25.4%	6.6%	0.8%	17.4%
WXIA-TV Atlanta/SurveyUSA	July 11–18, 2017	1,085	± 4.4%	6%	9%	4%	8%	9%	10%	27%	6%	1%	20%
Landmark/Rosetta Stone	March 8, 2017	1,200	± 2.9%	1.8%	8.6%	3.8%	9.3%	5.8%	8.0%	28.6%	6.1%	–	28%

== Results ==
=== General election ===
2017 Atlanta mayoral election
Party	Candidate	Votes	%
Nonpartisan	Keisha Lance Bottoms	25,347	26.19%
Nonpartisan	Mary Norwood	20,144	20.81%
Nonpartisan	Cathy Woolard	16,134	16.67%
Nonpartisan	Peter Aman	10,924	11.29%
Nonpartisan	Vincent Fort	9,310	9.62%
Nonpartisan	Ceasar Mitchell	9,124	9.43%
Nonpartisan	Kwanza Hall	4,192	4.33%
Nonpartisan	John H. Eaves	1,202	1.24%
Nonpartisan	Rohit Ammanamanchi	196	0.20%
Nonpartisan	Michael T. Sterling (withdrew)	104	0.11%
Nonpartisan	Glenn S. Wrightson	100	0.10%
Nonpartisan	Laban King	0	0.00%
Write-in		7	0.01%
Total votes		96,777	100.00%

=== Runoff ===
2017 Atlanta mayoral runoff election results
Party	Candidate	Votes	%
Nonpartisan	Keisha Lance Bottoms	46,464	50.41%
Nonpartisan	Mary Norwood	45,705	49.59%
Total votes		92,169	100.00%

== See also ==
- Mayor of Atlanta
- 2017 United States elections
