= Karen Handel =

American politician (born 1962)

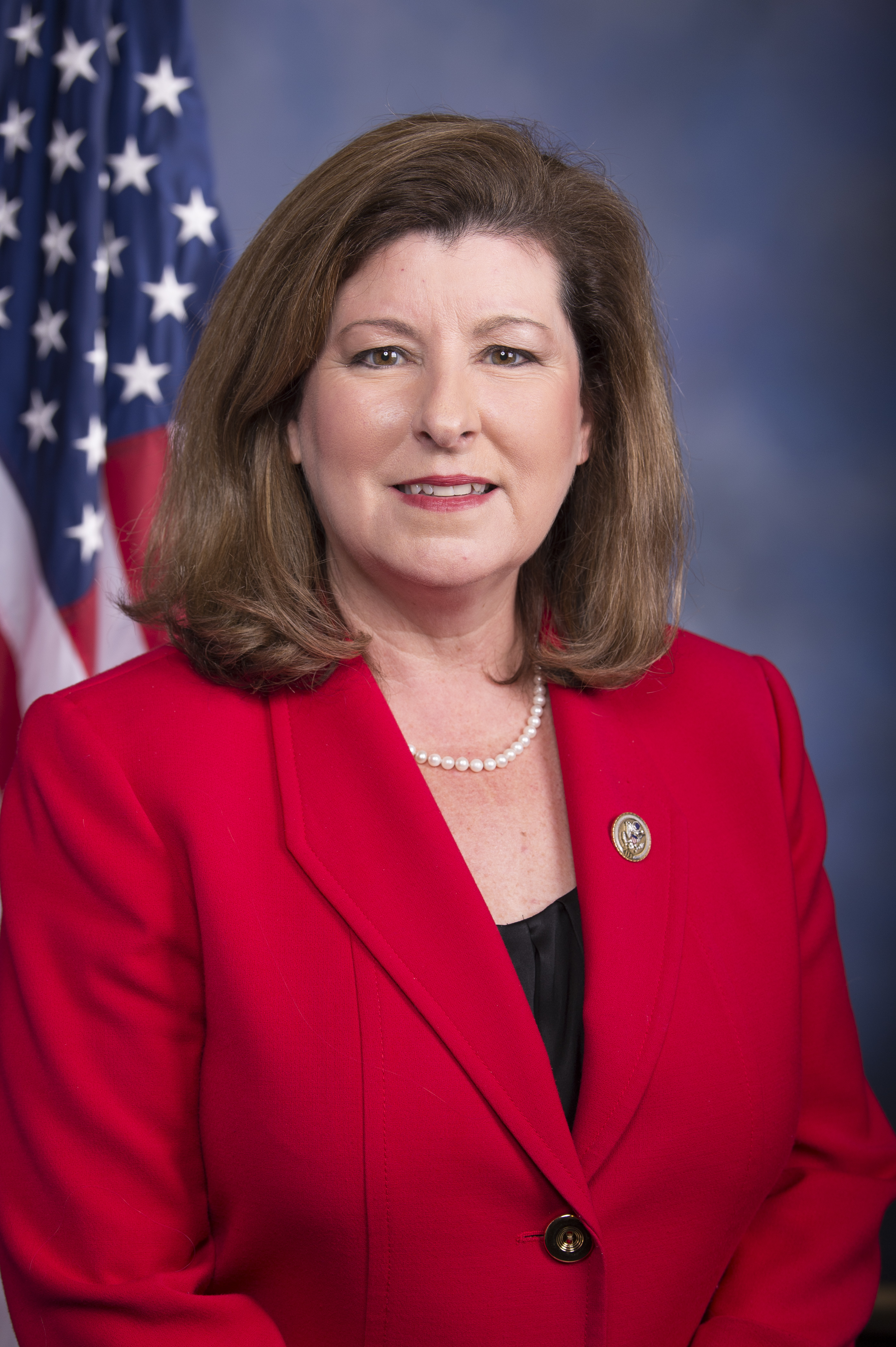
- Official portrait, 2017

Member of the U.S. House of Representatives from Georgia's 6th district
- In office June 26, 2017 – January 3, 2019
- Preceded by: Tom Price
- Succeeded by: Lucy McBath

26th Secretary of State of Georgia
- In office January 13, 2007 – January 8, 2010
- Governor: Sonny Perdue
- Preceded by: Cathy Cox
- Succeeded by: Brian Kemp

Personal details
- Born: Karen Christine Walker; April 18, 1962 (age 64) Washington, D.C., U.S.
- Party: Republican
- Spouse: Steve Handel (m. 1992)
- Education: Prince George's Community College (attended); University of Maryland, University College (attended)

Karen Christine Handel (née Walker; born April 18, 1962) is an American businesswoman and former politician. A member of the Republican Party, Handel served as chair of the Fulton County Board of Commissioners from 2003 to 2006, as Secretary of State of Georgia from 2007 to 2010, and in the U.S. House of Representatives from 2017 to 2019.

In 2010, Handel ran for Governor of Georgia but narrowly lost the Republican primary to Nathan Deal, who attacked Handel as overly supportive of gay rights and abortion rights. In 2011, Handel was appointed Senior Vice President of public policy at Susan G. Komen for the Cure, a charity focused on fighting breast cancer. Handel pushed the charity to cut off Komen's funding for breast-cancer screening at Planned Parenthood, reportedly because of her personal anti-abortion views. In the ensuing uproar over politicization of the charity, Handel resigned from Komen in February 2012.

In 2017, Handel became the first Republican woman from Georgia elected to Congress after winning a special election to fill a vacancy in Georgia's 6th congressional district. In the 2018 general election, Handel narrowly lost her seat to Democrat Lucy McBath. On November 3, 2020, Handel lost to McBath in a rematch, earning a lower percentage of the vote than she did in 2018.

== Early life and education ==
Handel was born Karen Christine Walker in Washington, D. C., on April 18, 1962, and grew up in Upper Marlboro, Maryland. After graduating in May 1980 from Frederick Douglass High School in Upper Marlboro, Handel attended both Prince George's Community College, in Largo, Maryland, and the University of Maryland, University College, in Adelphi, Maryland, but did not earn a degree. She then went to work for Hallmark Cards. Later, she served as deputy chief of staff to Vice President Dan Quayle's wife, Marilyn, where she worked to promote breast cancer awareness and research.

Handel worked at several major companies, including the global eye-care company Ciba Vision and the international accounting firm KPMG. She served as president and CEO of the Greater Fulton County Chamber of Commerce. From December 2002 to November 2003, Handel served as deputy chief of staff to Georgia Governor Sonny Perdue, where she worked as a policy advisor and supervised constituent services, the Governor's Mansion, and general administration services.

== Career ==
=== Early career ===
In November 2003, Handel was elected chairman of the Fulton County Board of Commissioners in a special election to replace Mike Kenn, receiving 58% of the popular vote, and continued to serve in that role until 2006. She had run for commissioner unsuccessfully in November 2002, while serving as the president and CEO of North Fulton County Chamber of Commerce. Handel chose not to run for re-election as the chairman of the Fulton County Board of Commissioners, in order to run for Georgia Secretary of State.

=== Secretary of State of Georgia ===
In August 2006, Handel won the Republican primary election for Secretary of State of Georgia, defeating state Senator Bill Stephens of Canton. Handel received 56.6% of the vote, to Stephens's 42.4%. In the November 2006 general election, Handel defeated Democratic nominee Gail Buckner, receiving 54.1% of the vote, to Buckner's 41.8%. Handel was the first elected Republican secretary of state in Georgia history. She served as Georgia Secretary of State from 2007 to 2010.

Soon after taking office as Georgia Secretary of State, Handel began a project to purge voter rolls. The procedure involved matching data with information in various sources, such as the Georgia Department of Driver Services database or the Social Security Administration database. Some eligible voters were told that they were "non-citizens", although, in fact, they were citizens. Voter suppression allegations were raised, and the rule became the subject of a federal lawsuit by the ACLU of Georgia and MALDEF, which accused Handel's office of engaging in a "systematic purging procedure" expressly barred by federal law within 90 days of elections.

In 2009, the United States Department of Justice Civil Rights Division (DOJ) ordered a halt to the state's "voter verification" effort (denying it approval under the Voting Rights Act of 1965), determining that "thousands of citizens who are in fact eligible to vote under Georgia law have been flagged", and that the program was "flawed ... [and] frequently subjects a disproportionate number of African-American, Asian, and/or Hispanic voters to additional and, more importantly, erroneous burdens on the right to register to vote". This marked the first time since the 1990s that the Justice Department had denied approval to a change in Georgia election practice.

Handel defended her program, asserting that it was appropriate and necessary. A federal judge in Atlanta later dismissed a lawsuit that had accused Handel's successor, Secretary of State Brian Kemp, of illegally bumping Georgia voters off the state's rolls ahead of the 2016 presidential election. In the 21-page ruling, U.S. District Judge Timothy C. Batten Sr. said that the state had taken a "reasonable and non-discriminatory" approach in trying to reach voters who had not cast a ballot within the past seven years to confirm their addresses.

=== 2010 gubernatorial election ===
In March 2009, Handel announced her decision to run for Georgia governor. Handel resigned as secretary of state in December 2009 in order to focus on her campaign for governor full-time. Handel received the endorsement of former Republican 2008 Vice-Presidential candidate Sarah Palin, as well as former Republican presidential candidate Mitt Romney.

On July 20, 2010, Handel received 34% of the vote in the Republican Party primary election, and former Congressman Nathan Deal received 23%. Since neither candidate received a majority, they faced off in the Republican gubernatorial run-off on August 10, 2010. The primary campaign was particularly heated; Deal attacked Handel as insufficiently anti-abortion and his allies portrayed Handel as a "barren woman", claiming that her infertility rendered her untrustworthy on reproductive-rights issues. Deal also attacked Handel for her past association with the gay-rights group Log Cabin Republicans, given staunch opposition to gay rights among Republican voters. Handel falsely denied membership with Log Cabin Republicans and accused Deal of "bigoted remarks", but lost the run-off election to Deal by 50.2% to 49.8%, with about 2,500 votes separating them out of nearly 580,000 cast. She declined to request a recount, and conceded to Deal the next day.

=== Susan G. Komen Foundation ===
In April 2011, Handel was hired as senior vice president of public policy at the breast cancer charity Susan G. Komen for the Cure ("Komen"). In this position, she was responsible for leading the organization's federal and state advocacy efforts, including management of Advocacy Alliance.

At the end of January 2012, Komen stated it would cut ties with Planned Parenthood, the largest single provider of abortion services in the U.S. The organization attributed the decision to a newly adopted policy not to fund organizations under investigation by a government agency. Republicans in Congress initiated an investigation into Planned Parenthood's alleged usage of federal funds to finance the organization's abortion services.

On February 2, 2012, Jeffrey Goldberg reported in The Atlantic that "three sources with direct knowledge of the Komen decision-making process told me that the rule was adopted in order to create an excuse to cut-off Planned Parenthood". Goldberg further reported that his anonymous sources indicated that the decision to cut funding to Planned Parenthood was driven by Handel, who opposes abortion.

On February 5, 2012, The Huffington Post reported that "e-mails between Komen leadership ... confirm Handel's sole 'authority' in crafting and implementing the Planned Parenthood policy... Handel submitted the new grant criteria to Komen leadership in November, and the board approved it in December, at which point Komen's top public health official resigned 'on the spot'."

Four days after the decision to cut ties with Planned Parenthood, Komen reversed the decision and announced that it would amend the policy to "make clear that disqualifying investigations must be criminal and conclusive in nature, and not political". A few days later, on February 7, 2012, Handel resigned from Komen.

The Los Angeles Times described Komen's decision to cut ties with Planned Parenthood as "one of the great PR faux pas of the decade", with Komen losing 22% of its funding in the subsequent fiscal year. Komen officials also attributed much of the lost funding to the decision to cut ties with Planned Parenthood.

=== Memoir ===
On September 11, 2012, Handel published a book, Planned Bullyhood, about her tenure as vice president of public policy at Susan G. Komen for the Cure. In the book, Handel defended Komen's short-lived decision to end grants to Planned Parenthood. She refers to Planned Parenthood as "a blatantly partisan" group of "bullies" that began a war with Komen over $700,000, an amount of money "inconsequential" to its $1 billion budget.

=== 2014 Senate election ===
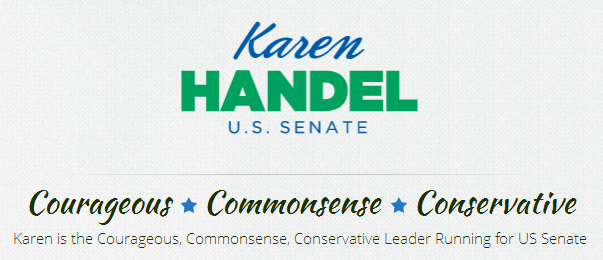
Logo for Karen Handel's 2014 Senate campaign

On May 17, 2013, Handel announced that she would be a candidate for the United States Senate. Incumbent senator Saxby Chambliss did not seek re-election. Handel was endorsed by former governor of Alaska Sarah Palin in March 2014.

One of her 2014 opponents, David Perdue, criticized her for not having a college degree. Julianne Thompson, co-chair of the Atlanta Tea Party, replied to the charge by saying: "One of the most important things we look for in a leader is that person's ability to identify with the citizens they intend to govern."

In May 2014, Handel came in third in the Republican Senate primary, with 21.96% of the vote; she failed to qualify for the run-off election.

== U.S. House of Representatives ==
=== Elections ===
==== 2017 ====
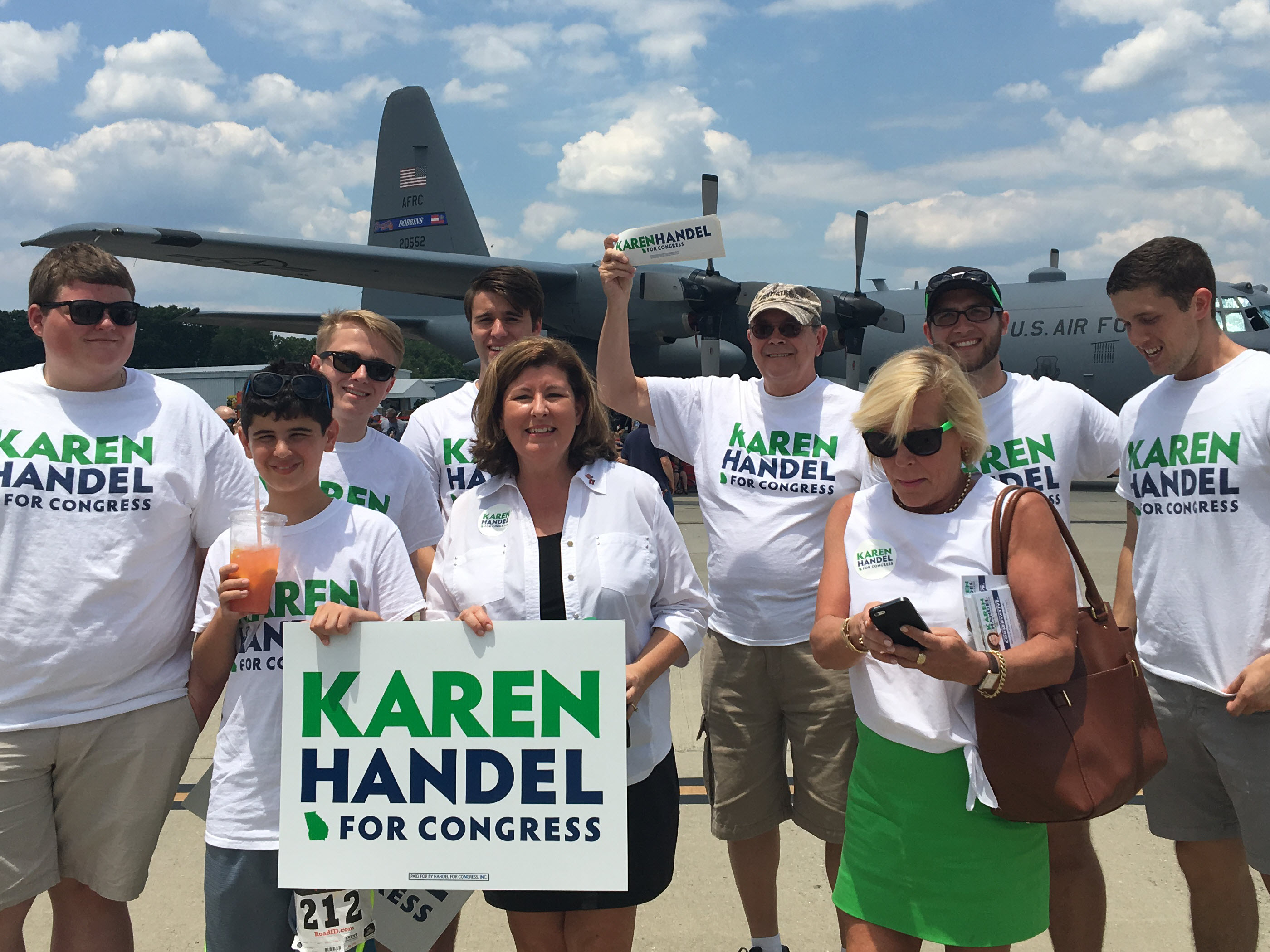
Karen Handel campaigning for the 2017 run-off election

In February 2017, Handel announced a run for U.S. House of Representatives in the 2017 special election, to fill a vacancy in Georgia's 6th congressional district, against Democratic candidate Jon Ossoff. Former U.S. Senator Saxby Chambliss endorsed Handel.

During the April 18, 2017, primary, Handel was the top Republican vote-getter in the 6th District race. No candidate reached a majority of the vote, leading to a run-off election on June 20, 2017. Handel finished second in the jungle primary, and faced Ossoff in the run-off. Ossoff received 48.1% of the vote, and Handel received 19.8% of the vote. U.S. President Donald Trump congratulated her on advancing to the run-off, and she welcomed his support.

According to The Washington Post, during the primary, Handel avoided mentioning Trump, but embraced him in the general election. She said that she would welcome Trump if he wanted to campaign with her. Handel and Trump held a fund-raiser in April 2017.

Speaker of the House Paul Ryan campaigned for Handel, saying, "We need someone who is tested and true", and Handel was endorsed by the United States Chamber of Commerce, Susan B. Anthony List, National Right to Life Committee, and the NRA Political Victory Fund.

On June 15, 2017, Handel's home was the target of a "suspicious package" containing a "white powdery substance" and a threatening letter. Several of Handel's neighbors received similar suspicious packages in the mail. Handel stated, "It is frustrating that my neighbors have been affected in this way. Steve and I know that running for public office often brings these kinds of challenges, but our neighbors did not sign up for this." The FBI was called in to investigate.

The race received significant national attention, after being highly touted as an early test of how the first few months of Donald Trump's presidency may have shifted the opinions or voter enthusiasm of suburban voters who live in swing districts. Combined spending by both candidates' campaigns reached over $55 million, which was the most expensive U.S. congressional race until the 2020 SC Senate race and GA Senate Runoff races reached $73 million and $106 million respectively.

On June 20, 2017, Handel won the special election run-off, and defeated Ossoff 52% to 48%. Following reports of the election results, The New York Times characterized the race as "demoralizing for Democrats".

==== 2018 ====
Handel ran for a full term in 2018 and was unopposed in the Republican primary. In the May 22 Democratic primary, gun control activist Lucy McBath defeated Kevin Abel, Steven Knight Griffin, and Bobby Kaple. In the general election, Handel lost to McBath by 3,264 votes in a mild upset.

==== 2020 ====
Handel challenged McBath in the 2020 election. On May 22, 2020, President Trump endorsed her candidacy. Handel won the Republican nomination on June 9, 2020, with nearly 75% of the vote. but was again defeated by McBath in the general election. Her former opponent, Jon Ossoff, whom she defeated in 2017 for the vacancy in Georgia's 6th congressional district, went on to win a U.S. Senate seat in 2020 with the help of Stacey Abrams's organizing efforts to register 800,000 new voters.

=== Tenure ===
Handel was sworn into office on June 26, 2017. She became Georgia's first Republican congresswoman.

On June 22, 2018, Handel, while presiding over the House of Representatives, cited House Rule XVII in an attempt to stop California Representative Ted Lieu from playing audio previously published by ProPublica that recorded the voices of children and infants separated from their parents under the Trump administration family separation policy. The rule cited reads, "A person on the floor of the House may not smoke or use a mobile electronic device that impairs decorum."

She was ranked by The Lugar Center as the 320th most bi-partisan member of the House during the 115th Congress.

=== Committee assignments ===
- Committee on Education and the Workforce
  - Subcommittee on Early Childhood, Elementary, and Secondary Education
  - Subcommittee on Workforce Protections
- Committee on the Judiciary
  - Subcommittee on Regulatory Reform, Commercial and Anti-Trust Law
  - Subcommittee on the Constitution and Civil Justice
- Republican Study Committee

== Political positions ==
In 2014, Handel described herself as an "unwavering conservative fighter", rather than a "go-along-to-get-along" Republican. In the campaign for the 2014 Senate seat, she said that she would be a senator in the mold of Ted Cruz, and called on Mitch McConnell to resign from the Republican leadership of the Senate.

=== President Donald Trump ===
During the 115th Congress, Handel's votes aligned with President Donald Trump’s preferred positions 98.4% of the time, according to political reporting website FiveThirtyEight's online tracker. She deviated from Trump's position when she voted for a 2017 bill imposing sanctions on Russia, Iran, and North Korea; the bill was opposed by Trump (though he later signed it into law), but it passed the House 419–3.

Handel voiced support for Trump's May 9, 2017, firing of FBI Director James Comey, stating, "it's been clear for some time that FBI Director Comey has lost the confidence of Republicans, Democrats, and broader institutions, and his removal as FBI Director was probably overdue". Regarding reports that Trump had disclosed classified information to Russia, Handel said that such reports represented "potentially a gross assumption" by the press, stating, "we have investigations underway... I would suggest that all of us would let the process play out, and let the facts take us where the facts take us." In June 2017, she said that she was troubled by some of Trump's proposed cuts to federal research funds. She has also criticized Trump's use of Twitter. In May 2018, Handel voiced her support for the Special Counsel investigation, but added: "Do it expeditiously. Do it fairly and justly, and move it along."

=== Environment ===
Handel has said that the federal government's role in combating climate change should be "limited so that state and local government lead the way". She supported Trump's decision to withdraw the United States from the Paris Climate Agreement. Asked if she accepted the scientific consensus on climate change, Handel said, "Clearly, there have been changes in the climate", but did not say whether human activities contribute to climate change.

=== Health care ===
Handel favored repealing the Affordable Care Act (Obamacare). She had expressed support for Tom Price's legislation to replace Obamacare. She supported the May 2017 version of the American Health Care Act, the Republican Party's replacement plan for the Affordable Care Act. In a June 2017 debate, she stated that she would never support a bill that reduced protections for pre-existing conditions, and said that the AHCA did no such thing, while CNN noted that independent fact-checkers have found that the May 2017 version of AHCA would reduce protections for pre-existing conditions. Handel said, "I reject the premise of CBO", referring to the Congressional Budget Office estimate that 23 million more Americans would be uninsured if the May 2017 version of AHCA were to become law.

=== Voter identification requirements ===
Handel supports laws that require Americans to show photo identification before voting.

=== Economic issues ===
In a June 2017 debate, Handel stated that she opposed a minimum wage, saying, "This is an example of a fundamental difference between a liberal and a conservative. I do not support a livable wage." Handel stated, "The private sector creates good paying jobs when we have a robust economy, with lower taxes and less regulation."

Handel has described the tax system as comprising "onerous, punitive regulations, costly red tape, and a complex tax structure, with rates that are too high, are limiting business expansion and job growth".

Handel voted in favor of the Tax Cuts and Jobs Act of 2017. She called the passing of the bill a "historic moment", and said that the bill would be "transformative for hard-working American families and American companies, especially our small businesses". She said that "hard-working Americans" will "keep more of their money". She also said that the bill would enable small businesses to "innovate and grow".

=== Immigration ===
Handel opposed the bi-partisan Senate "Gang of Eight" bill, which would have provided a pathway to citizenship for the estimated 11 million undocumented immigrants in the United States. She opposes an automatic path to citizenship, saying, "These immigrants have come to our country and blatantly disregarded our laws. We cannot, we should not reward that. No amnesty. No ability to vote."

She supports building a wall along the US-Mexico border. Her campaign website stated: "True national security means securing our borders... The current immigration system is broken, and we MUST fix it."

=== Abortion ===
Handel opposes abortion, and favors eliminating government funding for Planned Parenthood. She wrote a book, Planned Bullyhood: The Truth Behind the Headlines about the Planned Parenthood Funding Battle with Susan G. Komen for the Cure, about the subject. She also opposes embryonic stem cell research.

In 2018, Handel received a 0% score from NARAL Pro-Choice America for her voting record on abortion-related issues. She received a 100% score from the National Right to Life Committee, an anti-abortion organization.

=== LGBT rights ===
Handel opposes same-sex marriage and same-sex civil unions. She voted against legislation that would have given domestic partner benefits. She opposes the adoption of children by gay individuals, stating that it "is not the best household for a child".

The Human Rights Campaign gave Handel a 0% score for her record relating to LGBT rights issues during the 115th Congress.

=== Gun policy ===
Handel received an "A" rating from the NRA Political Victory Fund, as well as their endorsement, in 2017. She supported Georgia's "campus carry" law which allows people to bring guns onto the campuses of state universities. When she ran for governor in 2010, her campaign circulated a photo of her using a rifle during a visit to an arms plant in Columbus, Georgia.

== Post-politics career ==
Following her defeat to return to the U.S. House of Representatives, Handel served as president and CEO of Carroll Tomorrow, the economic development organization for Carroll County from 2021 to 2023.

== Personal life ==
Handel is married to Steve Handel, and resides in Roswell, Georgia.

Handel is a Christian.

== Electoral history ==
Georgia's 6th congressional district special election, 2017
Party	Candidate	Votes	%
Democratic	Jon Ossoff	92,673	48.12
Republican	Karen Handel	38,071	19.77
Republican	Bob Gray	20,802	10.80
Republican	Dan Moody	17,028	8.84
Republican	Judson Hill	16,870	8.76
Republican	Kurt Wilson	1,820	0.95
Republican	David Abroms	1,639	0.85
Democratic	Ragin Edwards	504	0.26
Democratic	Ron Slotin	491	0.25
Republican	Bruce LeVell	455	0.24
Republican	Mohammad Ali Bhuiyan	415	0.22
Republican	Keith Grawert	415	0.22
Republican	Amy Kremer	351	0.18
Republican	William Llop	326	0.17
Democratic	Rebecca Quigg	304	0.16
Democratic	Richard Keatley	229	0.12
Independent	Alexander Hernandez	121	0.06
Independent	Andre Pollard	55	0.03
Total votes		192,569	100.00
Plurality		54,602	28.35

Georgia's 6th congressional district special election (2017)
Party	Candidate	Votes	%	±%
Republican	Karen Handel	134,799	51.78%	−9.90%
Democratic	Jon Ossoff	125,517	48.22%	+9.90%
Total votes		260,316	100.0%	
Majority		9,282	3.57%	−19.8%
Turnout		260,455	58.16%	
Republican hold				

2018 Republican primary results
Party	Candidate	Votes	%
Republican	Karen Handel (incumbent)	40,410	100.0
Total votes		40,410	100.0

Georgia's 6th congressional district, 2018
Party	Candidate	Votes	%
Democratic	Lucy McBath	160,139	50.5
Republican	Karen Handel (incumbent)	156,875	49.5
Total votes		317,014	100.0
Democratic gain from Republican			

Georgia's 6th congressional district, 2020
Party	Candidate	Votes	%
Democratic	Lucy McBath (incumbent)	216,775	54.59
Republican	Karen Handel	180,329	45.41
Total votes		397,104	100.0
Democratic hold			

== See also ==
- Women in the United States House of Representatives

Party political offices
Preceded by Charlie Bailey	Republican nominee for Secretary of State of Georgia; 2006	Succeeded by Brian Kemp
Political offices
Preceded by Cathy Cox	Secretary of State of Georgia; 2007–2010	Succeeded by Brian Kemp
U.S. House of Representatives
Preceded by Tom Price	Member of the U.S. House of Representatives from Georgia's 6th congressional district 2017–2019	Succeeded by Lucy McBath
U.S. order of precedence (ceremonial)
Preceded by Denise Majette as Former U.S. Representative	Order of precedence of the United States as Former U.S. Representative	Succeeded by Carolyn Bourdeaux as Former U.S. Representative
