= Slotin (disambiguation) =

Louis Slotin (1910–1946) was a Canadian physicist and chemist.

Slotin may also refer to:

- 12423 Slotin, a minor planet
- Ron Slotin (born 1963/1964), American politician
- Slotin Building, a building in Savannah, Georgia, U.S.; see National Register of Historic Places listings in Chatham County, Georgia
