= Lucy McBath =

American politician (born 1960)

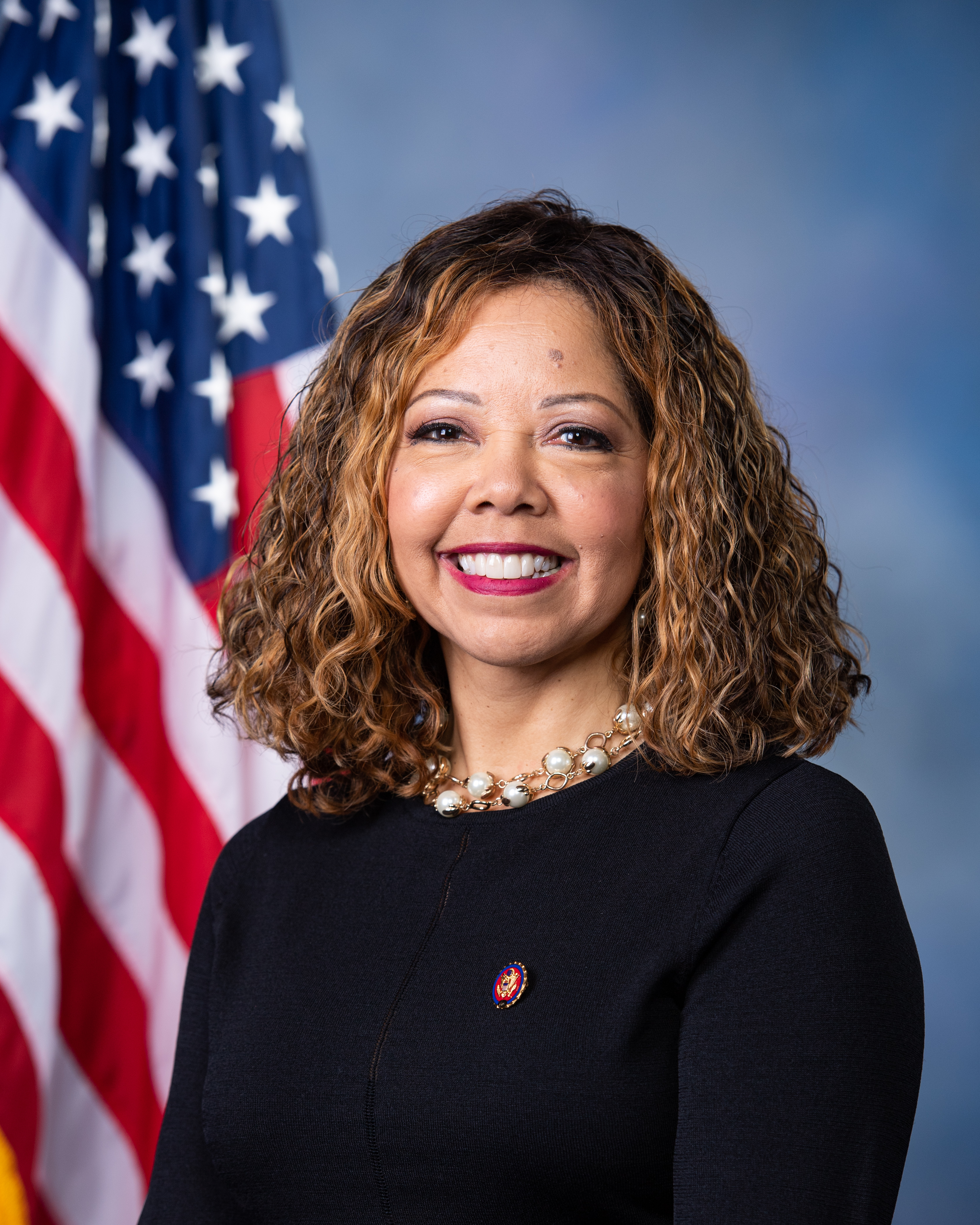
- Official portrait, 2019

Member of the U.S. House of Representatives from Georgia
- Incumbent
- Assumed office January 3, 2019
- Preceded by: Karen Handel
- Constituency: 6th district (2019–2023); 7th district (2023–2025); 6th district (2025–present)

Personal details
- Born: Lucia Kay Holman; June 1, 1960 (age 66) Joliet, Illinois, U.S.
- Party: Democratic
- Spouse(s): Ronald Davis (divorced) Curtis McBath (m. 2008)
- Children: 2, including Jordan Davis
- Education: Virginia State University (BA)
- Website: House website Campaign website
- McBath's voice McBath supporting the COVID-19 Hate Crimes Act. Recorded May 18, 2021

Lucia Kay McBath (née Holman; born June 1, 1960) is an American politician who has served in the United States House of Representatives from a district in the suburbs of Atlanta, Georgia, since 2019. She represented Georgia's 6th congressional district from 2019 to 2023 and since 2025, and represented the neighboring 7th district from 2023 to 2025. McBath is a member of the Democratic Party.

McBath's son, Jordan Davis, was murdered in November 2012. She then became an advocate for gun control, joining other mothers of Black murder victims to form the Mothers of the Movement, and spoke at the 2016 Democratic National Convention.

McBath ran for the House of Representatives in 2018, narrowly defeating Republican incumbent Karen Handel and defeating her again in 2020. McBath switched to the 7th district after redistricting in 2020 made the 6th significantly more favorable to Republicans; she defeated the 7th's incumbent, Carolyn Bourdeaux, in the Democratic primary and won the general election.

== Early life, education, and career ==
McBath was born in Joliet, Illinois, on June 1, 1960. Her father, Lucien Holman, was a dentist who owned The Black Voice, an African-American newspaper, and served as president of the NAACP's Illinois chapter. Her mother, Wilma, is white and worked as a nurse. Lucy has a sister, Lori.

McBath attended Virginia State University and graduated with a bachelor's degree in political science in 1982. After college, she worked as an intern for former Virginia governor Douglas Wilder. In the 1990s, she became a flight attendant for Delta Air Lines and relocated to Atlanta, where Delta is headquartered.

== Political activism ==
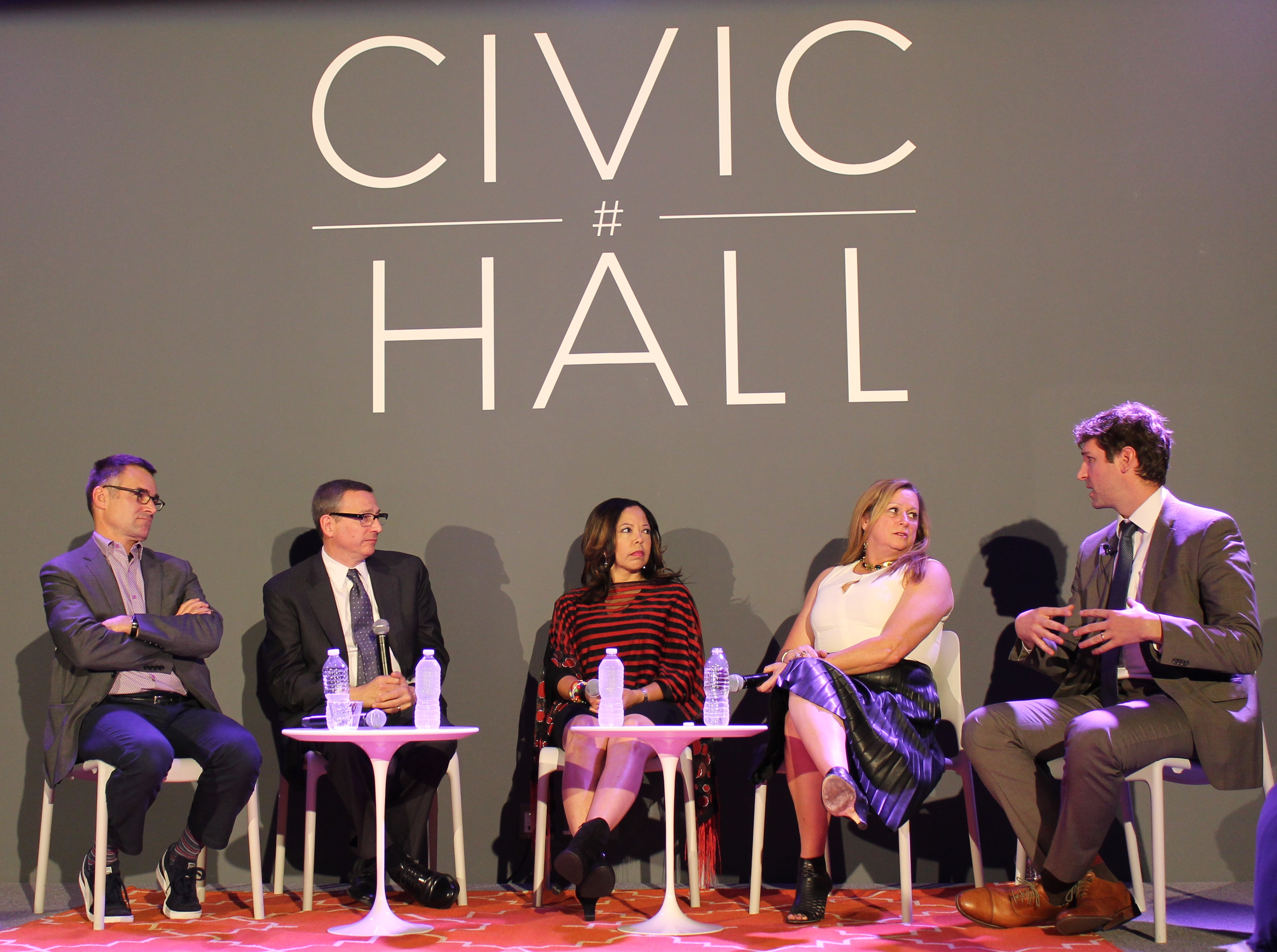
McBath on a panel discussion about the film Armor of Light and the issue of gun violence, 2015

In 2012, McBath's 17-year-old son, Jordan Davis, was shot and killed following an argument at a gas station in Florida about loud music. The shooting and its aftermath received national attention, and prompted discussion about controversial self-defense laws, commonly known as stand-your-ground laws. Her son's killer, Michael Dunn, was convicted of first-degree murder and was sentenced to life in prison without the possibility of parole.

Following her son's death, McBath joined Moms Demand Action for Gun Sense in America as a national spokeswoman. She attended a speech by President Barack Obama on gun violence at the White House and supported the My Brother's Keeper Challenge. McBath also joined the gun control advocacy group Mothers of the Movement, which consists of African American women whose children have been killed by gun violence. McBath opposed campus carry legislation in Florida.

McBath campaigned actively for Hillary Clinton in the 2016 presidential election and spoke on her behalf at the 2016 Democratic National Convention.

McBath created a foundation, Champion In The Making Legacy, to help high school graduates continue their education and training.

McBath appeared in a 2015 documentary film, 3 1/2 Minutes, 10 Bullets, that explored her son's shooting. She also appeared in the 2015 documentary film The Armor of Light, in which Rob Schenck, an anti-abortion Evangelical minister, discusses gun violence in America; The Armor of Light won an Emmy Award for Outstanding Social Issue Documentary.

== U.S. House of Representatives ==
=== Elections ===
==== 2018 ====
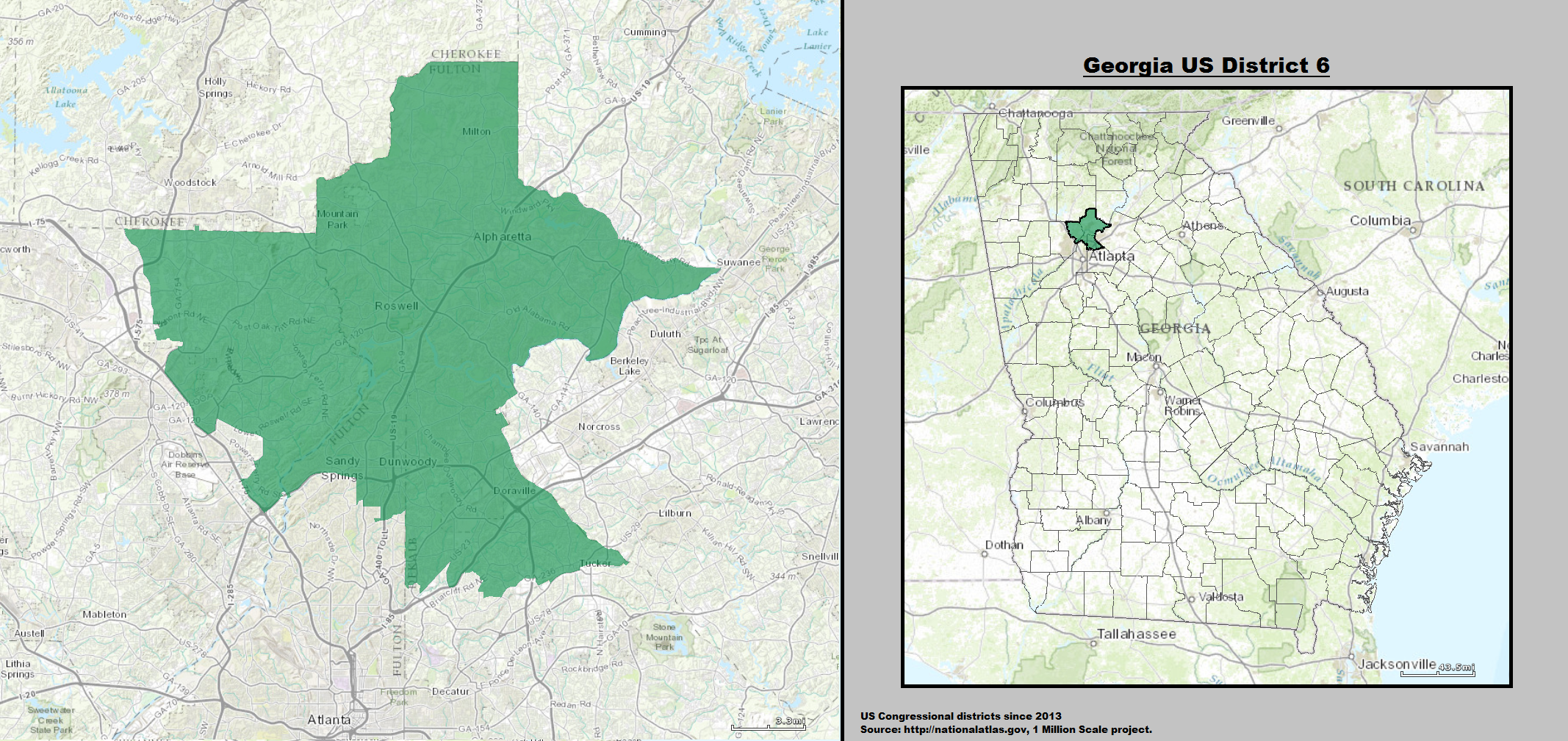
Georgia's 6th congressional district which included many of Atlanta's northern suburbs, 2018

McBath credits her decision to run for office to a meeting with State Representative Renitta Shannon, who urged her to run. Several other factors contributed to her decision, including the election of Donald Trump and the undoing of previously enacted gun control measures.

After initially planning to run for the Georgia House of Representatives against incumbent Republican Sam Teasley in 2018, she decided after the Stoneman Douglas High School shooting to instead challenge Karen Handel, the incumbent Republican in the United States House of Representatives representing Georgia's 6th congressional district. The district, which was once represented by House Speaker Newt Gingrich and Senator Johnny Isakson, included many of Atlanta's northern suburbs, such as Alpharetta, Roswell, Johns Creek, Dunwoody, Sandy Springs, Brookhaven, and parts of Tucker and Marietta.

Although the 6th has historically tilted Republican, Handel was thought to be vulnerable. Trump barely carried the district in 2016. Handel defeated Jon Ossoff in a hotly contested 2017 special election that remains the most expensive U.S. House race in American history.

In the Democratic Party primary election on May 22, McBath led all challengers with 36% of the vote. She defeated Kevin Abel, the second-place finisher, in the July 24 runoff election with 53.7% of the vote.

2018 Georgia's 6th congressional district election results

McBath faced Handel in the November general election and declared victory with 159,268 votes, surpassing Handel's 156,396 with 100% of precincts reporting. She became the first Democrat to represent this district since it moved to Atlanta's northern suburbs in 1993. Indeed, she was the first Democrat to garner even 40% of the vote in a general election for the district since Gingrich left office in 1999. A number of reports described McBath as the first Democrat to represent this district since Gingrich won it in 1978. But for his first seven terms, Gingrich represented a district that stretched across a swath of exurban and rural territory south and west of Atlanta; he transferred to the reconfigured 6th after the 1990 census.

The Atlanta Journal-Constitution called McBath's victory "the biggest Georgia Democratic upset of the 2018 midterms."

==== 2020 ====
McBath was discussed as a possible candidate in the 2020 Georgia Senate special election. According to The Hill, Democrats considered her "one of the top potential contenders" for the seat. However, she declined to run for the seat, instead seeking re-election to her house seat.

McBath raised $620,000 in the fourth quarter of 2019. As of the end of 2019, she had $1.3 million cash on hand for her reelection bid. 93% of her contributions came from small-dollar donors.

She won the November 3 general election with 54.6% of the vote in a rematch against Karen Handel. She got a significant boost from Joe Biden carrying the district with 55% of the vote, the first time a Democrat had carried the district at the presidential level since it moved to Atlanta's northern suburbs.

==== 2022 ====
Georgia's 7th congressional district near Atlanta, 2023

In the 2021 redistricting session, McBath's district was significantly altered by the Republican-controlled state legislature. Its share of heavily Democratic DeKalb County was cut out, replaced by conservative exurban counties such as Forsyth and Cherokee. The new configuration shifted the district from one that voted for Biden by double digits to one that voted for Trump by double digits, likely securing the seat for Republicans in the 2022 elections. Reports speculated that McBath could run in another district.

In November 2021, McBath announced that she would run for reelection in the 7th district, held by fellow Democrat Carolyn Bourdeaux. It had previously been based in Gwinnett County, but had been pushed slightly westward to absorb the more Democratic portions of McBath's former territory in Fulton County, making it significantly bluer than its predecessor. McBath defeated Bordeaux in the Democratic primary.

=== Tenure ===
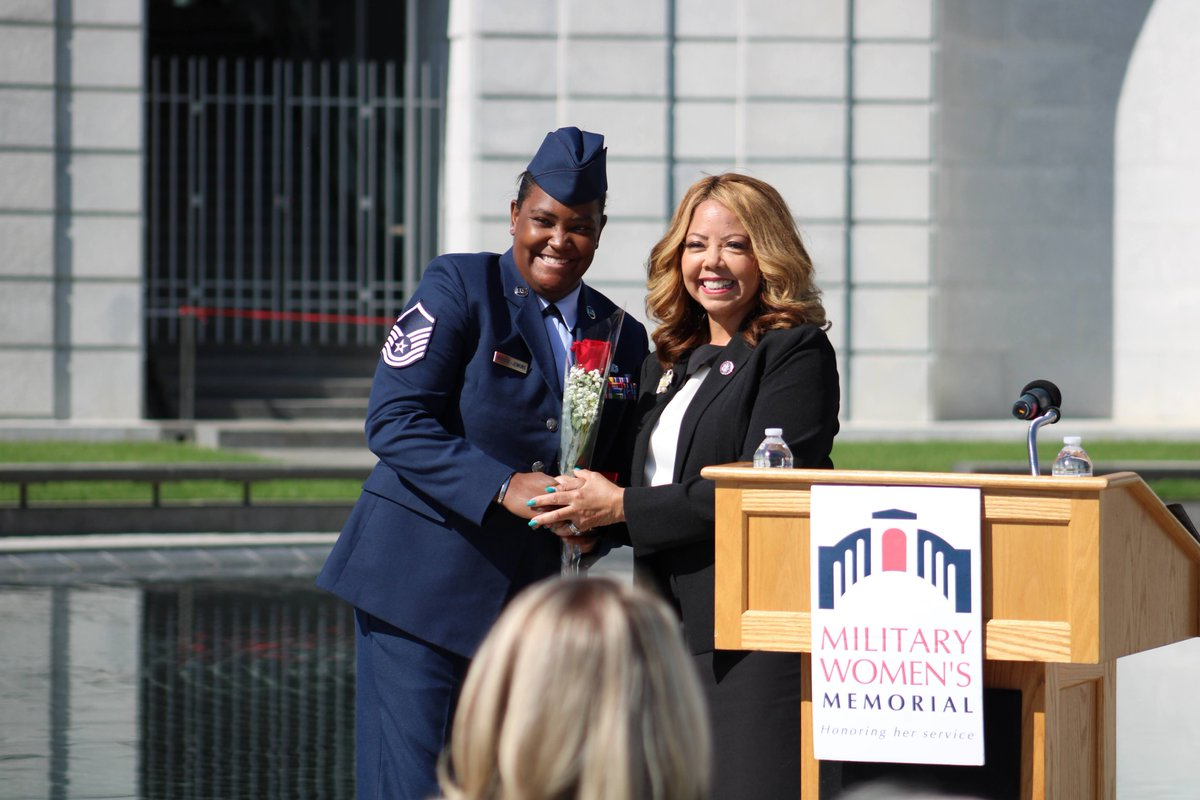
McBath honors a service member at the Military Women's Memorial, 2023.

McBath cosponsored the Honoring American Veterans in Extreme Need ("HAVEN") Act, which gives disabled veterans bankruptcy protections.

McBath co-sponsored legislation to extend Pell Grant eligibility to college students if their school closed or if school officials committed institutional fraud or misconduct.

Before the Trump–Ukraine scandal, McBath had been cautious about impeaching President Donald Trump, or opposed it outright. For instance, in the aftermath of the Mueller investigation, she was one of 137 Democrats to vote to kill an impeachment resolution. In October 2019, McBath voted in favor of launching an impeachment inquiry into Trump.

She sat on the House Judiciary Committee, which was tasked with handling some impeachment-related business. During a town hall event, she said she had felt "furious" about "the lack of accountability" from the Trump administration, due to what she called a lack of responsiveness to congressional subpoenas. At the same event, she said, "I don't like having to [participate in the impeachment process]. ... I don't want to have to say this about our President of the United States and the White House." In December 2019, she voted for articles of impeachment against Trump on the House Judiciary Committee.

=== Committee assignments ===
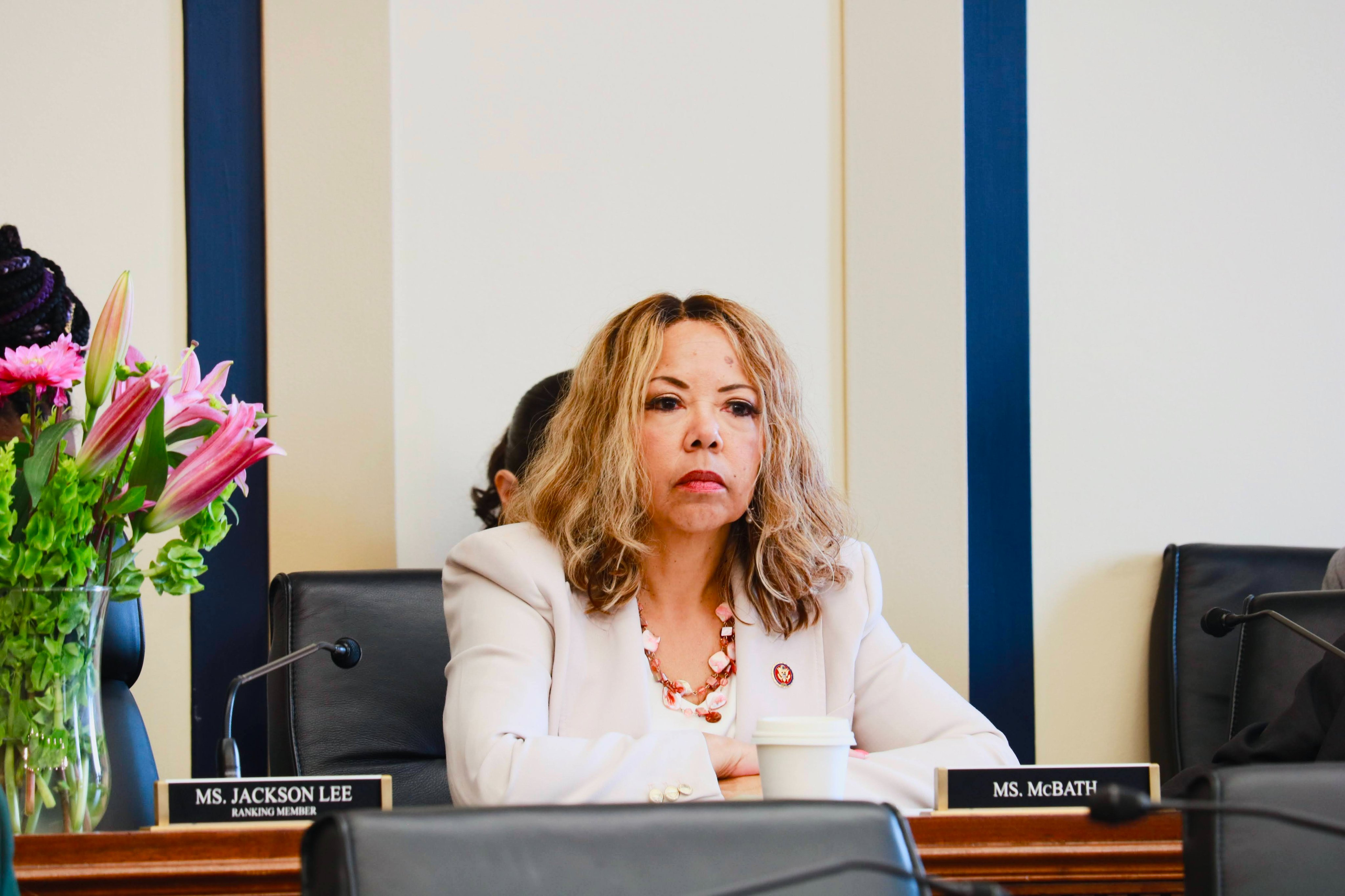
McBath on the House Judiciary Committee

For the 119th Congress:

- Committee on Education and the Workforce
  - Subcommittee on Health, Employment, Labor, and Pensions
  - Subcommittee on Higher Education and Workforce Development
- Committee on the Judiciary
  - Subcommittee on Crime and Federal Government Surveillance (ranking member)

=== Caucus memberships ===
- Black Maternal Health Caucus
- Congressional Black Caucus
- Congressional Equality Caucus
- Congressional Asian Pacific American Caucus
- New Democrat Coalition

== Political positions ==
=== Abortion ===
McBath supports abortion rights. She has said she supports funding programs that give women "autonomy over their reproductive decisions".

=== Health care ===
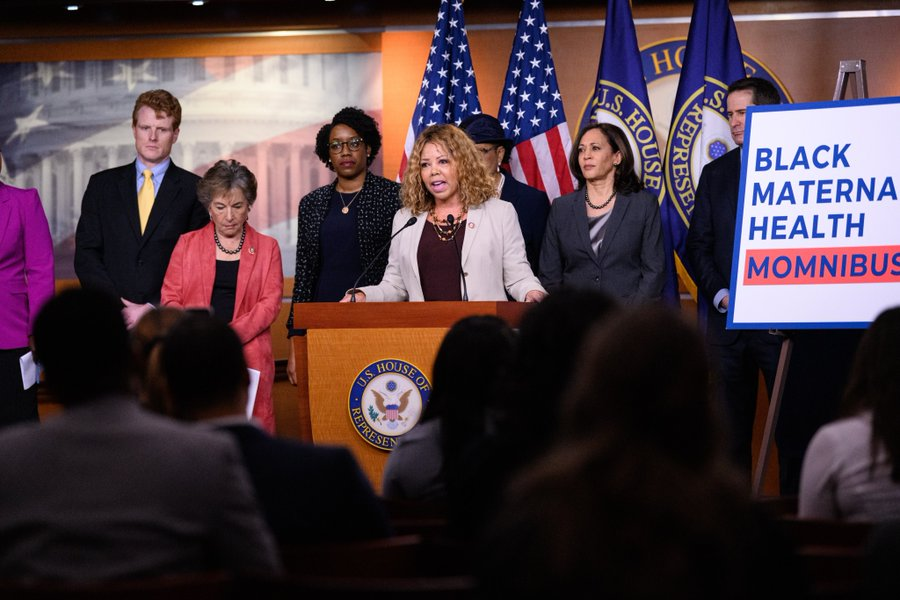
McBath speaks in support of maternal healthcare and the Momnibus bill, 2023.

McBath has stated support for "incremental measures to shore up" the Affordable Care Act (Obamacare). She stated that she favors that approach over transitioning to a Medicare for All system.

McBath supports Medicaid expansion in Georgia, and would lower the age of Medicare eligibility to 55.

=== Economy ===
McBath has said she is critical of some of the 2017 Republican tax cuts, but would like to make the temporary middle-class tax cuts permanent.

McBath voted for the Raise the Wage Act, which would increase the federal minimum wage to $15 per hour. Before voting for the bill, the centrist New Democrat coalition (of which McBath is a part) secured some changes: a longer timeline to phase in the wage increases, and provisions that would pause wage increases if a federal study shows adverse economic impacts.

=== Gun control ===
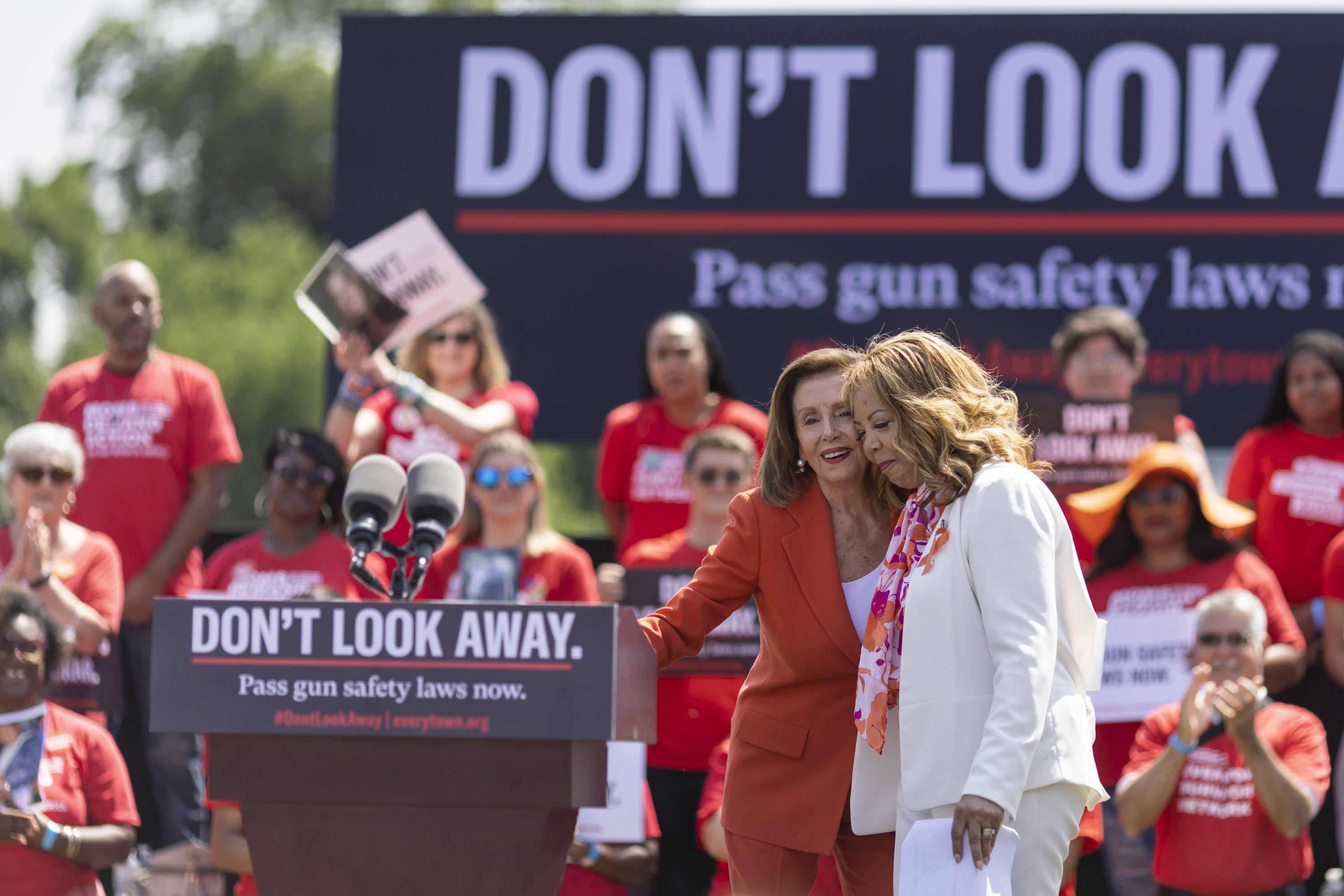
McBath speaks at an event in support of gun safety laws, 2022.

McBath initially decided to run for Congress because she believed the government was not doing enough to prevent gun violence. She supports universal background checks before purchasing a firearm, as well as red flag laws to keep guns out of the hands of people at risk of violence.

During the 2018 election, McBath vowed to respect Second Amendment rights. She also promised to push for "implementing background checks for all firearm purchases; raising the minimum age to purchase a gun to 21 years of age; working to defeat conceal carry reciprocity measures; and introducing legislation to keep guns out of the hands of domestic abusers and other criminals."

=== Immigration ===
McBath opposes abolishing the Immigration and Customs Enforcement agency (ICE).

In 2025, McBath was one of 46 House Democrats who joined all Republicans to vote for the Laken Riley Act.

== Personal life ==
McBath grew up in a military family; her father, brother, nephew and cousin all served in the U.S. military in some capacity. She has had breast cancer twice. She is married to Curtis McBath. They live in Marietta, Georgia.

In 1993, McBath was rushed to the emergency room while pregnant with her first son, Lucien. She suffered a fetal demise and was admitted to the hospital to deliver Lucien naturally. A year later, she was pregnant again and gave birth to her son Jordan. McBath is a Christian and named her son after the River Jordan in the Bible.

McBath lives in Marietta, and continued to live there after shifting to the 7th, even though that district does not include any portion of Cobb County. However, members of the House are only required to live in the state they represent.

She is a longtime member of Eagles Nest Church in Roswell.

== Electoral history ==
Georgia's 6th congressional district Democratic primary results, 2018
Party	Candidate	Votes	%
Democratic	Lucy McBath	15,138	36.27
Democratic	Kevin Abel	12,747	30.54
Democratic	Bobby Kaple	10,956	26.25
Democratic	Steven Griffin	2,901	6.95
Total votes		41,742	100.0

Democratic primary runoff results, 2018
Party	Candidate	Votes	%
Democratic	Lucy McBath	14,285	53.73
Democratic	Kevin Abel	12,303	46.27
Total votes		26,588	100.0

Georgia's 6th congressional district, 2018
Party	Candidate	Votes	%
Democratic	Lucy McBath	160,139	50.51
Republican	Karen Handel (incumbent)	156,875	49.49
Total votes		317,014	100.0
Democratic gain from Republican			

Georgia's 6th congressional district, 2020
Party	Candidate	Votes	%
Democratic	Lucy McBath (incumbent)	216,775	54.59
Republican	Karen Handel	180,329	45.41
Total votes		397,104	100.0
Democratic hold			

Georgia's 7th congressional district Democratic primary results, 2022
Party	Candidate	Votes	%
Democratic	Lucy McBath (incumbent)	33,607	63.09
Democratic	Carolyn Bourdeaux (incumbent)	16,310	30.62
Democratic	Donna McLeod	3,352	6.29
Total votes		53,269	100.0

Georgia's 7th congressional district, 2022
Party	Candidate	Votes	%
Democratic	Lucy McBath (incumbent)	143,063	61.05
Republican	Mark Gonsalves	91,262	38.95
Total votes		234,325	100.0
Democratic hold			

Georgia's 6th congressional district, 2024
Party	Candidate	Votes	%
Democratic	Lucy McBath (incumbent)	277,027	74.68
Republican	Jeff Criswell	93,909	25.32
Total votes		370,936	100.0
Democratic hold			

== See also ==
- List of African-American United States representatives
- Politics of Georgia
- Women in the United States House of Representatives
- Doreen Lawrence

U.S. House of Representatives
Preceded by Karen Handel	Member of the U.S. House of Representatives from Georgia's 6th congressional district 2019–2023	Succeeded by Rich McCormick
Preceded by Carolyn Bourdeaux	Member of the U.S. House of Representatives from Georgia's 7th congressional district 2023–2025	Succeeded by Rich McCormick
Preceded by Rich McCormick	Member of the U.S. House of Representatives from Georgia's 6th congressional district 2025-present	Incumbent
U.S. order of precedence (ceremonial)
Preceded by Mike Levin	United States representatives by seniority 213th	Succeeded by Dan Meuser
