= Dan Moody (Georgia politician) =

American politician

Dan Moody is an American politician from the state of Georgia. He is a member of the Republican Party.

Moody is a former officer in the United States Army Reserve. He won election to the Georgia State Senate in 2002. He opted not to run for reelection in 2010. In 2013, he was appointed to the board of the Georgia Department of Transportation, but resigned in 2015.

Moody declared his candidacy in the 2017 special election to succeed Tom Price in the United States House of Representatives for Georgia's 6th congressional district. Jon Ossoff and Karen Handel advanced to the runoff election.
