= Georgia's 6th congressional district =

U.S. House district for Georgia

Coordinates: 34°00′47″N 84°20′44″W

- Interactive map of district boundaries since January 3, 2025
- Representative: Lucy McBath; D–Marietta
- Distribution: 99.77% urban; 0.23% rural
- Population (2025): 807,860
- Median household income: $95,505
- Ethnicity: 54.8% White; 18.2% Black; 11.6% Asian; 11.2% Hispanic; 10.7% Two or more races; 4.4% other
- Cook PVI: D+25

Georgia's 6th congressional district is a congressional district in the U.S. state of Georgia. As of 2024, it is represented by Democrat Lucy McBath. It is the wealthiest congressional district in the Southeastern United States --outside of Northern Virginia-- and the 28th wealthiest in the United States, with 27.0 percent of households earning over $200,000, per a 2024 study.

== History ==
Georgia's 6th congressional district has existed since the 29th Congress (1845–1847), the first Congress in which U.S. representatives were elected from districts rather than at-large. Georgia gained a sixth U.S. representative for the first time in the 13th Congress (1813–1815).

Located in north-central Georgia, the district consists of some north-western suburbs of Atlanta, portions of eastern Cobb County, western and southern Fulton County, eastern Douglas County, and northern Fayette County. From 1965 to 1993, the 6th District covered a swath of exurban and rural territory south and west of Atlanta. In 1992, it moved to its present position in Atlanta's northern suburbs.

== Representatives ==
The district is known for producing prominent figures in American politics, including former House Speaker and 2012 presidential candidate Newt Gingrich, former Secretary of Health and Human Services Tom Price, and former U.S. Senator Johnny Isakson. It was also known as a suburban Republican stronghold for much of its recent history, and the party held the seat from 1992 to 2018. However, Metro Atlanta's recent population growth has brought Democratic-leaning voters into the area, as evidenced by McBath's 2018 victory over Republican incumbent Karen Handel. The district's new boundaries have made it into a safe Democratic district.

== Recent election results from statewide races ==
The following chart shows the results of recent federal and statewide races in the 6th district.

Year	Office	Winner	D %	R %
2012	President	Mitt Romney (R)	37.4%	60.9%
2016	President	Donald Trump (R)	46.8%	48.3%
2016	Senate	Johnny Isakson (R)	37.0%	57.9%
2018	Governor	Stacey Abrams (D)	51.0%	47.5%
2018	Lieutenant Governor	Sarah Riggs Amico (D)	50.1%	49.9%
2018	Attorney General	Chris Carr (R)	49.6%	50.4%
2020	President	Joe Biden (D)	54.9%	43.6%
2021	Senate	Jon Ossoff (D)	52.6%	47.4%
2021	Senate (special)	Raphael Warnock (D)	53.7%	46.3%
Redistricted for the 2022 cycle
2022	Senate	Herschel Walker (R)	41.5%	55.6%
2022	Governor	Brian Kemp (R)	35.7%	63.4%
2022	Lieutenant Governor	Burt Jones (R)	37.4%	60.0%
2022	Secretary of State	Brad Raffensperger (R)	33.3%	63.2%
2022	Attorney General	Chris Carr (R)	37.2%	61.0%
Redistricted for the 2024 cycle
2024	President	Kamala Harris (D)	74.6%	24.6%

== Counties and communities ==
For the 119th and successive Congresses (based on the districts drawn following a 2023 court order), the district contains all or portions of the following counties and communities.

Cobb County (4)

Austell, Fair Oaks (part; also 11th), Mableton, Marietta (part; also 11th), Powder Springs, Smyrna, Vinings

Douglas County (2)

Douglasville (part; also 3rd), Lithia Springs

Fayette County (2)

Fayetteville (part; also 3rd), Tyrone (part; also 3rd)

Fulton County (9)

Atlanta (part; also 5th; shared with DeKalb County), Chattahoochee Hills (part; also 3rd; shared with Coweta County), College Park (part; also 5th; shared with Clayton County), East Point (part; also 5th), Fairburn, Palmetto (part; also 3rd; shared with Coweta County), Sandy Springs (part; also 7th), South Fulton, Union City

== List of members representing the district ==
Member	Party	Years	Cong ress	Electoral history	District geography
District created March 4, 1827
Tomlinson Fort (Milledgeville)	Jacksonian	March 4, 1827 – March 3, 1829	20th	Elected in 1826.	1827–1829 [data missing]
District inactive		March 4, 1829 – March 3, 1845			
Howell Cobb (Athens)	Democratic	March 4, 1845 – March 3, 1851	29th 30th 31st	Re-elected in 1844. Re-elected in 1846. Re-elected in 1848. Elected Governor of Georgia in 1851.	1845–1853 [data missing]
Junius Hillyer (Monroe)	Constitutional Union	March 4, 1851 – March 3, 1855	32nd 33rd	Elected in 1851. Re-elected in 1853.	1845–1853 [data missing]
Junius Hillyer (Monroe)	Democratic	March 4, 1851 – March 3, 1855	32nd 33rd	Elected in 1851. Re-elected in 1853.	1853–1861 [data missing]
Howell Cobb (Athens)	Democratic	March 4, 1855 – March 3, 1857	34th	Elected in 1855. [data missing]	1853–1861 [data missing]
James Jackson (Athens)	Democratic	March 4, 1857 – January 23, 1861	35th 36th	Elected in 1857. Re-elected in 1859. Resigned from office in 1861, following Georgia's secession from the Union.	1853–1861 [data missing]
Vacant		January 23, 1861 – July 25, 1868	36th 37th 38th 39th 40th	Civil War and Reconstruction	
Vacant		July 25, 1868 – March 3, 1869	40th	Georgia rejoined the Union, but district failed to elect a member to finish the term.	1868–1873 [data missing]
Vacant		March 4, 1869 – December 22, 1870	41st	District failed to elect a member.	1868–1873 [data missing]
William P. Price (Dahlonega)	Democratic	December 22, 1870 – March 3, 1873	41st 42nd	Elected to finish the vacant term. Re-elected in 1870. Retired.	1868–1873 [data missing]
James H. Blount (Macon)	Democratic	March 4, 1873 – March 3, 1893	43rd 44th 45th 46th 47th 48th 49th 50th 51st 52nd	Elected in 1872. Re-elected in 1874. Re-elected in 1876. Re-elected in 1878. Re-elected in 1880. Re-elected in 1882. Re-elected in 1884. Re-elected in 1886. Re-elected in 1888. Re-elected in 1890. Retired.	1873–1883 [data missing]
James H. Blount (Macon)	Democratic	March 4, 1873 – March 3, 1893	43rd 44th 45th 46th 47th 48th 49th 50th 51st 52nd	Elected in 1872. Re-elected in 1874. Re-elected in 1876. Re-elected in 1878. Re-elected in 1880. Re-elected in 1882. Re-elected in 1884. Re-elected in 1886. Re-elected in 1888. Re-elected in 1890. Retired.	1883–1893 [data missing]
Thomas B. Cabaniss (Forsyth)	Democratic	March 4, 1893 – March 3, 1895	53rd	Elected in 1892. Lost renomination.	1893–1903 [data missing]
Charles L. Bartlett (Macon)	Democratic	March 4, 1895 – March 3, 1915	54th 55th 56th 57th 58th 59th 60th 61st 62nd 63rd	Elected in 1894. Re-elected in 1896. Re-elected in 1898. Re-elected in 1900. Re-elected in 1902. Re-elected in 1904. Re-elected in 1906. Re-elected in 1908. Re-elected in 1910. Re-elected in 1912. Retired.	1893–1903 [data missing]
Charles L. Bartlett (Macon)	Democratic	March 4, 1895 – March 3, 1915	54th 55th 56th 57th 58th 59th 60th 61st 62nd 63rd	Elected in 1894. Re-elected in 1896. Re-elected in 1898. Re-elected in 1900. Re-elected in 1902. Re-elected in 1904. Re-elected in 1906. Re-elected in 1908. Re-elected in 1910. Re-elected in 1912. Retired.	1903–1913 [data missing]
Charles L. Bartlett (Macon)	Democratic	March 4, 1895 – March 3, 1915	54th 55th 56th 57th 58th 59th 60th 61st 62nd 63rd	Elected in 1894. Re-elected in 1896. Re-elected in 1898. Re-elected in 1900. Re-elected in 1902. Re-elected in 1904. Re-elected in 1906. Re-elected in 1908. Re-elected in 1910. Re-elected in 1912. Retired.	1913–1923 [data missing]
James W. Wise (Fayetteville)	Democratic	March 4, 1915 – March 3, 1925	64th 65th 66th 67th 68th	Elected in 1914. Re-elected in 1916. Re-elected in 1918. Re-elected in 1920. Re-elected in 1922. Failed to attend the 68th Congress due to prolonged illness. Retired.	1913–1923 [data missing]
James W. Wise (Fayetteville)	Democratic	March 4, 1915 – March 3, 1925	64th 65th 66th 67th 68th	Elected in 1914. Re-elected in 1916. Re-elected in 1918. Re-elected in 1920. Re-elected in 1922. Failed to attend the 68th Congress due to prolonged illness. Retired.	1923–1933 [data missing]
Samuel Rutherford (Forsyth)	Democratic	March 4, 1925 – February 4, 1932	69th 70th 71st 72nd	Elected in 1924. Re-elected in 1926. Re-elected in 1928. Re-elected in 1930. Died.	1923–1933 [data missing]
Vacant		February 4, 1932 – March 2, 1932	72nd		1923–1933 [data missing]
Carlton Mobley (Forsyth)	Democratic	March 2, 1932 – March 3, 1933	72nd	Elected to finish Rutherford's term. Retired.	1923–1933 [data missing]
Carl Vinson (Milledgeville)	Democratic	March 4, 1933 – January 3, 1965	73rd 74th 75th 76th 77th 78th 79th 80th 81st 82nd 83rd 84th 85th 86th 87th 88th	Redistricted from the 10th district and re-elected in 1932. Re-elected in 1934. Re-elected in 1936. Re-elected in 1938. Re-elected in 1940. Re-elected in 1942. Re-elected in 1944. Re-elected in 1946. Re-elected in 1948. Re-elected in 1950. Re-elected in 1952. Re-elected in 1954. Re-elected in 1956. Re-elected in 1958. Re-elected in 1960. Re-elected in 1962. Retired.	1933–1943 [data missing]
Carl Vinson (Milledgeville)	Democratic	March 4, 1933 – January 3, 1965	73rd 74th 75th 76th 77th 78th 79th 80th 81st 82nd 83rd 84th 85th 86th 87th 88th	Redistricted from the 10th district and re-elected in 1932. Re-elected in 1934. Re-elected in 1936. Re-elected in 1938. Re-elected in 1940. Re-elected in 1942. Re-elected in 1944. Re-elected in 1946. Re-elected in 1948. Re-elected in 1950. Re-elected in 1952. Re-elected in 1954. Re-elected in 1956. Re-elected in 1958. Re-elected in 1960. Re-elected in 1962. Retired.	1943–1953 [data missing]
Carl Vinson (Milledgeville)	Democratic	March 4, 1933 – January 3, 1965	73rd 74th 75th 76th 77th 78th 79th 80th 81st 82nd 83rd 84th 85th 86th 87th 88th	Redistricted from the 10th district and re-elected in 1932. Re-elected in 1934. Re-elected in 1936. Re-elected in 1938. Re-elected in 1940. Re-elected in 1942. Re-elected in 1944. Re-elected in 1946. Re-elected in 1948. Re-elected in 1950. Re-elected in 1952. Re-elected in 1954. Re-elected in 1956. Re-elected in 1958. Re-elected in 1960. Re-elected in 1962. Retired.	1953–1963 [data missing]
Carl Vinson (Milledgeville)	Democratic	March 4, 1933 – January 3, 1965	73rd 74th 75th 76th 77th 78th 79th 80th 81st 82nd 83rd 84th 85th 86th 87th 88th	Redistricted from the 10th district and re-elected in 1932. Re-elected in 1934. Re-elected in 1936. Re-elected in 1938. Re-elected in 1940. Re-elected in 1942. Re-elected in 1944. Re-elected in 1946. Re-elected in 1948. Re-elected in 1950. Re-elected in 1952. Re-elected in 1954. Re-elected in 1956. Re-elected in 1958. Re-elected in 1960. Re-elected in 1962. Retired.	1963–1973 [data missing]
John Flynt (Griffin)	Democratic	January 3, 1965 – January 3, 1979	89th 90th 91st 92nd 93rd 94th 95th	Redistricted from the 4th district and re-elected in 1964. Re-elected in 1966. Re-elected in 1968. Re-elected in 1970. Re-elected in 1972. Re-elected in 1974. Re-elected in 1976. Retired.	1963–1973 [data missing]
John Flynt (Griffin)	Democratic	January 3, 1965 – January 3, 1979	89th 90th 91st 92nd 93rd 94th 95th	Redistricted from the 4th district and re-elected in 1964. Re-elected in 1966. Re-elected in 1968. Re-elected in 1970. Re-elected in 1972. Re-elected in 1974. Re-elected in 1976. Retired.	1973–1983 [data missing]
Newt Gingrich (Marietta)	Republican	January 3, 1979 – January 3, 1999	96th 97th 98th 99th 100th 101st 102nd 103rd 104th 105th	Elected in 1978. Re-elected in 1980. Re-elected in 1982. Re-elected in 1984. Re-elected in 1986. Re-elected in 1988. Re-elected in 1990. Re-elected in 1992. Re-elected in 1994. Re-elected in 1996. Re-elected in 1998, but resigned.	1973–1983 [data missing]
Newt Gingrich (Marietta)	Republican	January 3, 1979 – January 3, 1999	96th 97th 98th 99th 100th 101st 102nd 103rd 104th 105th	Elected in 1978. Re-elected in 1980. Re-elected in 1982. Re-elected in 1984. Re-elected in 1986. Re-elected in 1988. Re-elected in 1990. Re-elected in 1992. Re-elected in 1994. Re-elected in 1996. Re-elected in 1998, but resigned.	1983–1993 [data missing]
Newt Gingrich (Marietta)	Republican	January 3, 1979 – January 3, 1999	96th 97th 98th 99th 100th 101st 102nd 103rd 104th 105th	Elected in 1978. Re-elected in 1980. Re-elected in 1982. Re-elected in 1984. Re-elected in 1986. Re-elected in 1988. Re-elected in 1990. Re-elected in 1992. Re-elected in 1994. Re-elected in 1996. Re-elected in 1998, but resigned.	1993–2003 [data missing]
Vacant		January 3, 1999 – February 23, 1999	106th		1993–2003 [data missing]
Johnny Isakson (Marietta)	Republican	February 23, 1999 – January 3, 2005	106th 107th 108th	Elected to finish Gingrich's term. Re-elected in 2000. Re-elected in 2002. Retired to run for U.S. Senator.	1993–2003 [data missing]
Johnny Isakson (Marietta)	Republican	February 23, 1999 – January 3, 2005	106th 107th 108th	Elected to finish Gingrich's term. Re-elected in 2000. Re-elected in 2002. Retired to run for U.S. Senator.	2003–2006; Parts of Cobb, Cherokee, and Fulton counties
Tom Price (Roswell)	Republican	January 3, 2005 – February 10, 2017	109th 110th 111th 112th 113th 114th 115th	Elected in 2004. Re-elected in 2006. Re-elected in 2008. Re-elected in 2010. Re-elected in 2012. Re-elected in 2014. Re-elected in 2016. Resigned to become U.S. Secretary of Health and Human Services.	2003–2006; Parts of Cobb, Cherokee, and Fulton counties
Tom Price (Roswell)	Republican	January 3, 2005 – February 10, 2017	109th 110th 111th 112th 113th 114th 115th	Elected in 2004. Re-elected in 2006. Re-elected in 2008. Re-elected in 2010. Re-elected in 2012. Re-elected in 2014. Re-elected in 2016. Resigned to become U.S. Secretary of Health and Human Services.	2007–2013; Cherokee County and parts of Cobb, DeKalb, and Fulton counties
Tom Price (Roswell)	Republican	January 3, 2005 – February 10, 2017	109th 110th 111th 112th 113th 114th 115th	Elected in 2004. Re-elected in 2006. Re-elected in 2008. Re-elected in 2010. Re-elected in 2012. Re-elected in 2014. Re-elected in 2016. Resigned to become U.S. Secretary of Health and Human Services.	2013–2023; Parts of Cobb, DeKalb, and Fulton counties
Vacant		February 10, 2017 – June 26, 2017	115th		2013–2023; Parts of Cobb, DeKalb, and Fulton counties
Karen Handel (Roswell)	Republican	June 26, 2017 – January 3, 2019	115th	Elected to finish Price's term. Lost re-election.	2013–2023; Parts of Cobb, DeKalb, and Fulton counties
Lucy McBath (Marietta)	Democratic	January 3, 2019 – January 3, 2023	116th 117th	Elected in 2018. Re-elected in 2020. Redistricted to the 7th district.	2013–2023; Parts of Cobb, DeKalb, and Fulton counties
Rich McCormick (Suwanee)	Republican	January 3, 2023 – January 3, 2025	118th	Elected in 2022. Redistricted to the 7th district.	2023–2025; Dawson and Forsyth counties; Parts of Cobb, Cherokee, Fulton, and Gwinnett counties
Lucy McBath (Marietta)	Democratic	January 3, 2025 – present	119th	Redistricted from the 7th district and re-elected in 2024. Re-elected in 2026.	2025–present Parts of Cobb, Clayton, Douglas, Fayette, and Fulton counties

== Election results ==
Graph of election results in Georgia's 6th congressional district (minor parties are omitted)

=== 1974 ===
Georgia's 6th congressional district election (1974)
Party	Candidate	Votes	%
Democratic	Jack Flynt (Incumbent)	49,082	51.45%
Republican	Newt Gingrich	46,308	48.55%
Total votes			100.00%
Turnout			
Democratic hold			

=== 2000 ===
Georgia's 6th congressional district election (2000)
Party	Candidate	Votes	%
Republican	Johnny Isakson (Incumbent)	256,595	74.75%
Democratic	Brett DeHart	86,666	25.25%
Total votes		343,261	100.00%
Turnout			
Republican hold			

=== 2002 ===
Georgia's 6th congressional district election (2002)
Party	Candidate	Votes	%
Republican	Johnny Isakson (Incumbent)	163,209	79.91%
Democratic	Jeff Weisberger	41,043	20.09%
Total votes		204,252	100.00%
Turnout			
Republican hold			

=== 2004 ===
Georgia's 6th congressional district election (2004)
Party	Candidate	Votes	%
Republican	Tom Price	267,542	100.00%
Total votes		267,542	100.00%
Turnout			
Republican hold			

=== 2006 ===
Georgia's 6th congressional district election (2006)
Party	Candidate	Votes	%
Republican	Tom Price (Incumbent)	144,958	72.39%
Democratic	Steve Sinton	55,294	27.61%
Total votes		200,252	100.00%
Turnout			
Republican hold			

=== 2008 ===
Georgia's 6th congressional district election (2008)
Party	Candidate	Votes	%
Republican	Tom Price (Incumbent)	231,520	68.48%
Democratic	Bill Jones	106,551	31.52%
Total votes		338,071	100.00%
Turnout			
Republican hold			

=== 2010 ===
Georgia's 6th congressional district election (2010)
Party	Candidate	Votes	%
Republican	Tom Price (Incumbent)	198,100	99.91%
Write-In	Sean Greenberg	188	0.09%
Total votes		198,288	100.00%
Turnout			
Republican hold			

=== 2012 ===
Georgia's 6th congressional district election (2012)
Party	Candidate	Votes	%
Republican	Tom Price (Incumbent)	189,669	64.51%
Democratic	Jeff Kazanow	104,365	35.49%
Total votes		294,034	100.00%
Turnout			
Republican hold			

=== 2014 ===
Georgia's 6th congressional district election (2014)
Party	Candidate	Votes	%
Republican	Tom Price (Incumbent)	139,018	66.04%
Democratic	Robert G. Montigel	71,486	33.96%
Total votes		210,504	100.00%
Turnout			
Republican hold			

=== 2016 ===
Georgia's 6th congressional district election (2016)
Party	Candidate	Votes	%
Republican	Tom Price (Incumbent)	201,088	61.7%
Democratic	Rodney Stooksbury	124,917	38.3%
Total votes		326,005	100.00%
Turnout			
Republican hold			

=== 2017 special election ===
2017 primary election
Party	Candidate	Votes	%
Democratic	Jon Ossoff	92,673	48.2%
Republican	Karen Handel	38,071	19.7%
Republican	Bob Gray	20,755	10.8%
Republican	Dan Moody	16,994	8.8%
Republican	Judson Hill	16,848	8.8%
Republican	Kurt Wilson	1,812	0.94%
Republican	David Abroms	1,637	0.85%
Democratic	Ragin Edwards	502	0.26%
Democratic	Ron Slotin	488	0.25%
Republican	Bruce LeVell	455	0.24%
Republican	Mohammad Ali Bhuiyan	414	0.22%
Republican	Keith Grawert	414	0.22%
Republican	Amy Kremer	349	0.18%
Republican	William Llop	326	0.17%
Democratic	Rebecca Quigg	304	0.16%
Democratic	Richard Keatley	227	0.12%
Independent	Alexander Hernandez	121	0.06%
Independent	Andre Pollard	55	0.03%
Total votes		192,084	100.00%
Turnout			43.47%
Plurality		54,602	28.35%

2017 run-off election
Party	Candidate	Votes	%	±%
Republican	Karen Handel	134,799	51.78%	−9.9%
Democratic	Jon Ossoff	125,517	48.22%	+9.9%
Total votes		260,316	99.95%	
Majority		9,282	3.57%	−19.8%
Turnout		260,455	58.16%	
Republican hold				

=== 2018 ===
Georgia's 6th congressional district election, 2018
Party	Candidate	Votes	%
Democratic	Lucy McBath	160,139	50.51%
Republican	Karen Handel (Incumbent)	156,875	49.49%
Independent	Jeremy "Carlton Heston" Stubbs	18	
Total votes		317,014	100.0%
Democratic gain from Republican			

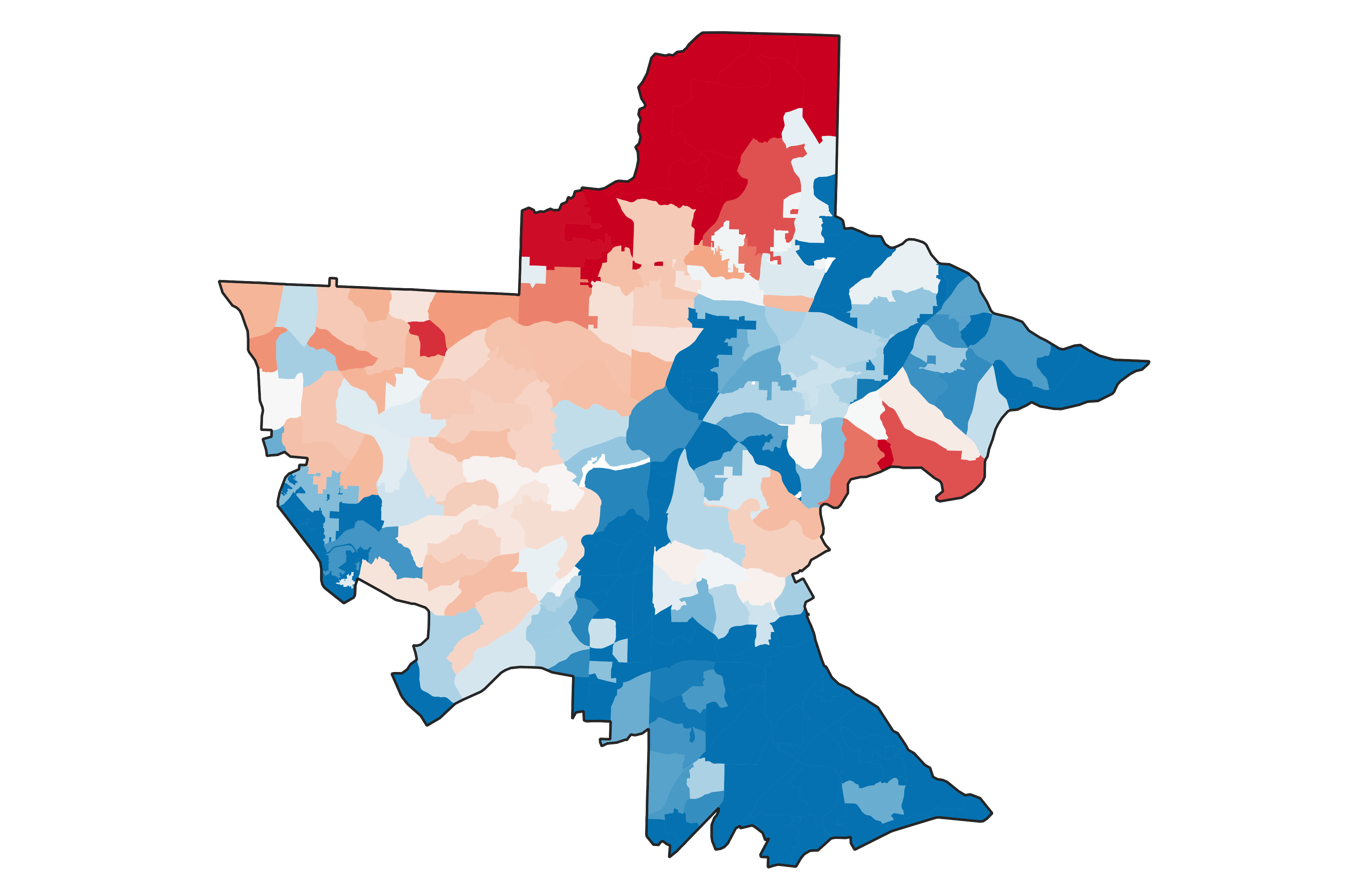
The image above shows the 2020 Presidential election results in Georgia's 6th Congressional District, where blue represents precincts won by Joe Biden and red represents precincts won by Donald Trump.

=== 2020 ===
Georgia's 6th congressional district election, 2020
Party	Candidate	Votes	%
Democratic	Lucy McBath (Incumbent)	216,775	54.59%
Republican	Karen Handel	180,329	45.41%
Total votes		397,104	100.0%
Democratic hold			

=== 2024 ===
Georgia's 6th congressional district election, 2024
Party	Candidate	Votes	%
Democratic	Lucy McBath	277,027	74.7%
Republican	Jeff Criswell	93,909	25.3%
Total votes		370,981	100.0%
Democratic hold			

== See also ==
- Georgia's at-large congressional district
- Georgia's 10th congressional district
- Georgia's 4th congressional district
- Georgia's congressional districts
- Georgia's 6th congressional district special election, 2017

U.S. House of Representatives
Preceded by Massachusetts's 1st congressional district	Home district of the speaker December 22, 1849 – March 4, 1851	Succeeded by Kentucky's 1st congressional district
Preceded by Washington's 5th congressional district	Home district of the speaker January 4, 1995 – January 3, 1999	Succeeded by Illinois's 14th congressional district
