= Women for Trump =

American political organization

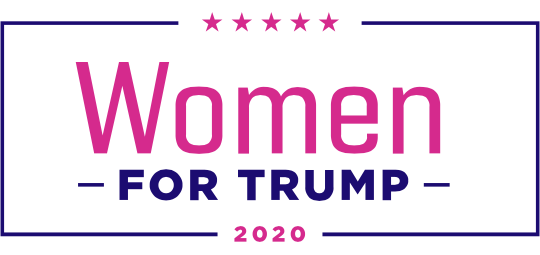
Women for Trump logo

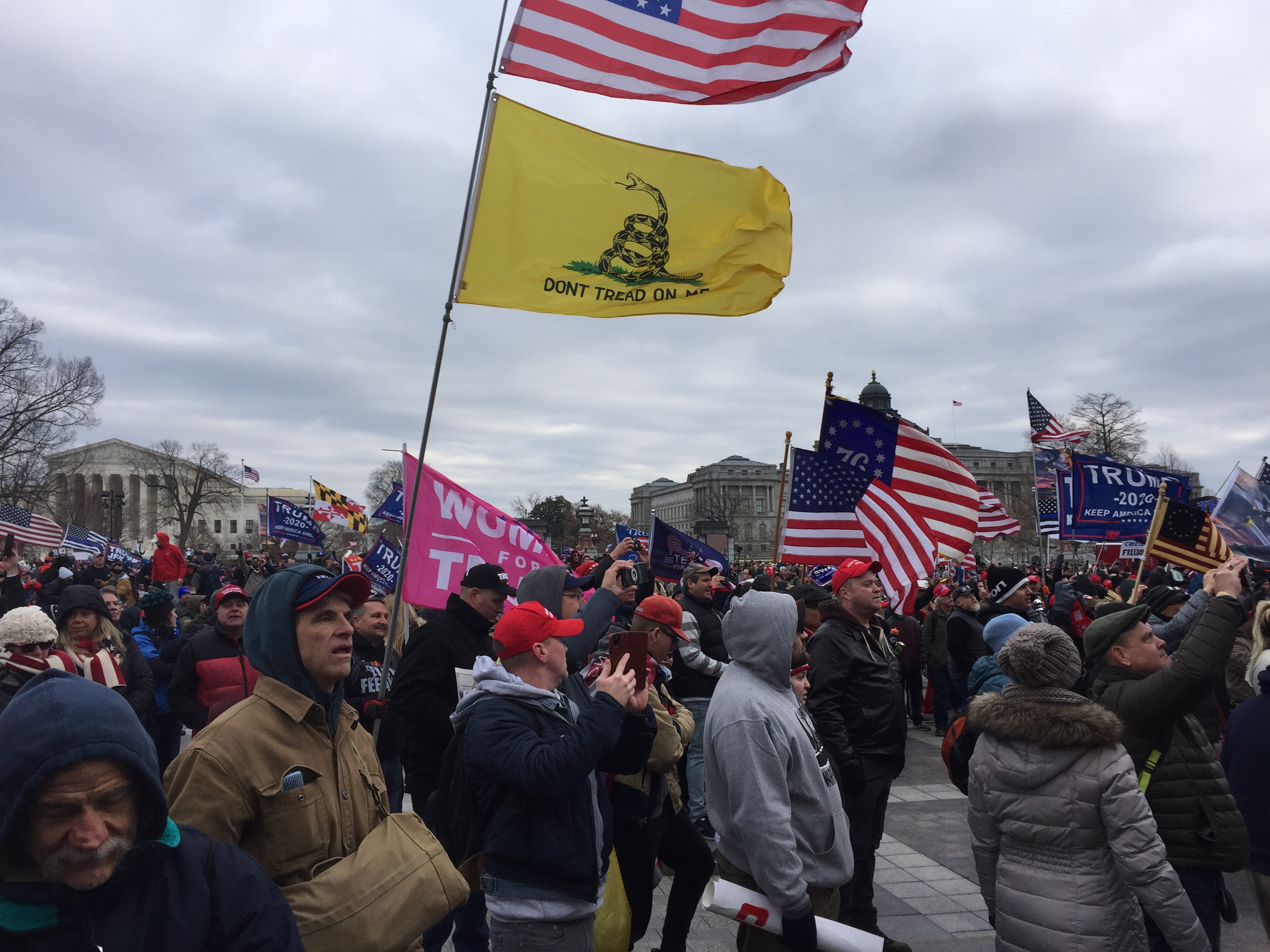
An obscured "Women for Trump" flag, flying alongside the Gadsden flag outside the U.S. Capitol on January 6, 2021, the day it was stormed

Women for Trump is a political group in the United States who have supported the presidency of U.S President Donald Trump.

== History ==
=== 2016 ===
Women for Trump was co-founded by Amy Kremer and Kathryn Serkes in June 2016. Kremer was one of the founders of the modern-day Tea Party movement, and a co-founder of the social networking site Tea Party Patriots. She is the former director and current chairman of the Tea Party Express, a national bus tour supporting Tea Party advocates. She was a co-founder of Great America PAC in support of Trump in the 2016 presidential election.

Nationally, Hillary Clinton gained 54% of women voters compared with Trump's 39%; however, Trump outperformed Clinton among white women, winning 47% of their vote compared to Clinton's 45%. Racial resentment has proved to have played a significant role in why Trump was able to win the plurality of white women's votes. More white women without college degrees (61%) voted for Trump. 28% of 350,000 donations made to Trump's campaign came from women, according to Politico.

=== 2017 ===
The Women for Trump organization donated to the Trump campaign through the Women Vote Smart political action committee. Women Vote Smart raised more than $26,000 in 2017, according to the Federal Election Commission, but was more than $20,000 in debt as of March 2017.

=== 2019 ===
Although a June Hill–Harris survey reported that 62% of women registered to vote were unlikely to vote for a Trump re-election, the Women for Trump campaign was rallying support and donations to support the upcoming 2020 elections. Politico reported in November 2019 that the Women for Trump coalition was accepting donations and seeking volunteers to push their initiative and spread their political message. The organization held a 2020 kickoff party at the Westgate resort in Orlando, Florida, on June 17, 2019.

As of December, 36.3% of Trump's donations had come from women. In the first quarter of 2019, donations were evenly split between men and women, according to available FEC data. First-quarter donations from women totaled approximately $15 million.

During the 2019 impeachment inquiry into Donald Trump, Kremer and her daughter Kylie also started a new nonprofit, Women for America First, which can raise unlimited money to rally support for the president without disclosing its donors, and were behind a "March for Trump: Stop Impeachment Now!" rally in Washington, D.C., on October 17, 2019.

=== 2020 ===
Kylie Jane Kremer, executive director of Women for Trump, created the "Stop the Steal" Facebook group on November 4, 2020, the day after Election Day, as a forum for people to falsely claim that the ballot counting was being manipulated against Trump. It became one of the fastest-growing groups in Facebook's history, gaining more than 320,000 users in a day before being shut down by Facebook, which said users of the group had tried to incite violence.

=== 2021 ===
Kylie Jane Kremer was named on a permit as the person in charge of the rally in Washington, D.C., on January 6 that preceded the attack on the U.S. Capitol.
