= 2017 Georgia's 6th congressional district special election =

- April 18, 2017; June 20, 2017 (runoff)

Georgia's 6th congressional district
- Turnout: 58.16%
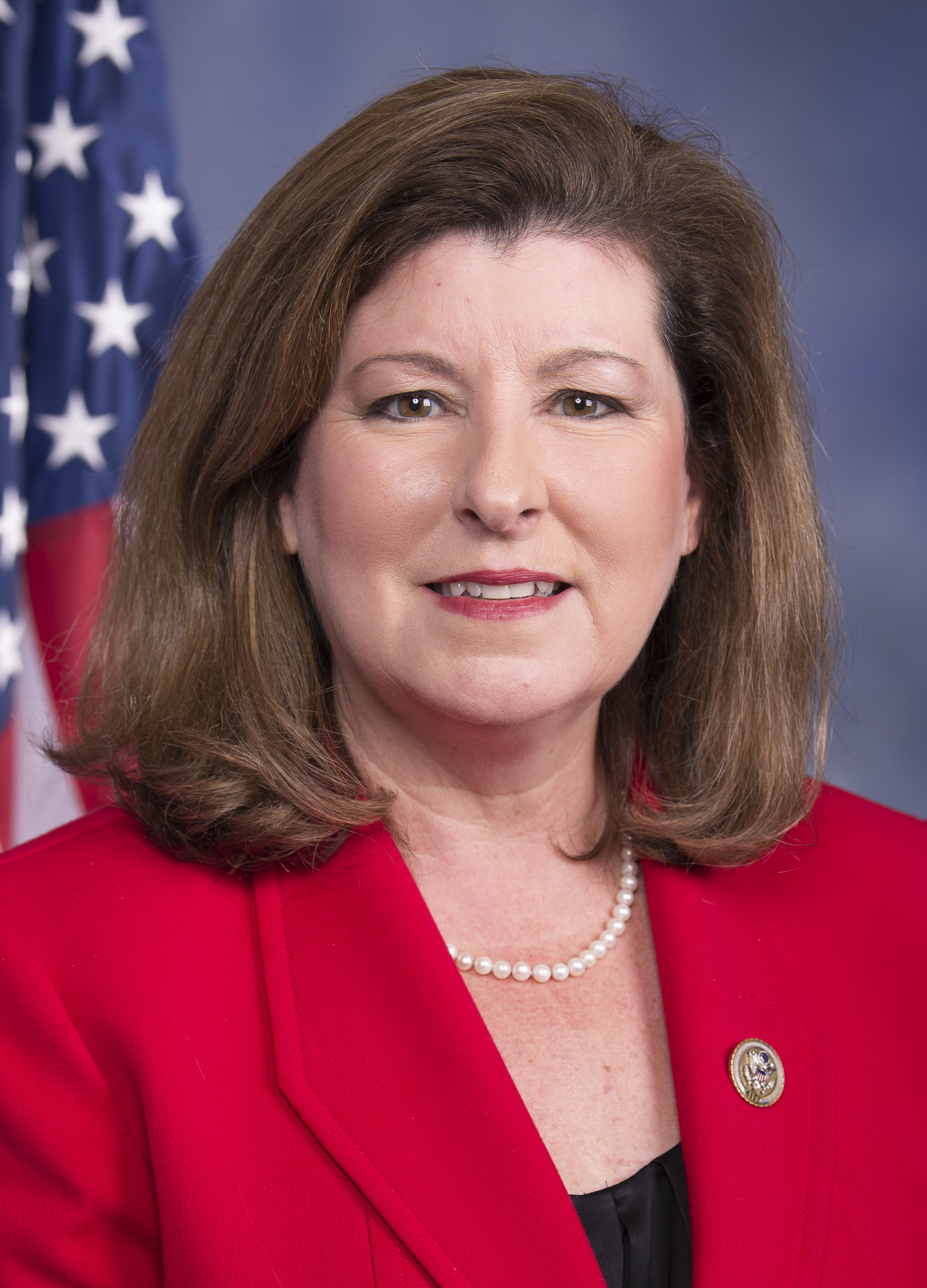

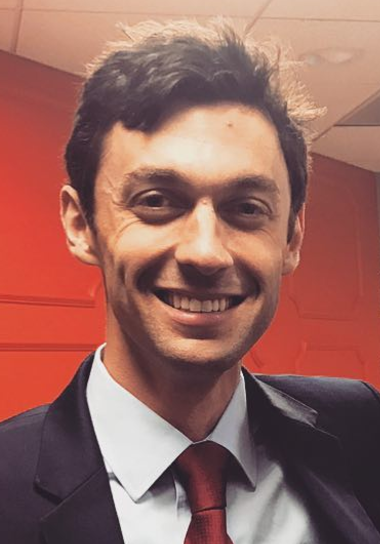
Nominee	Karen Handel	Jon Ossoff
Party	Republican	Democratic
Popular vote	134,799	125,517
Percentage	51.78%	48.22%
- Handel: 50–60% 60–70% 70–80% 80–90% Ossoff: 50–60% 60–70% 70–80% 80–90% Tie: 50% No votes
U.S. Representative before election
Tom Price
Republican
Elected U.S. Representative
Karen Handel
Republican

A special election to determine the member of the United States House of Representatives for Georgia's 6th congressional district was held on April 18, 2017, with a runoff held two months later on June 20. Republican Karen Handel narrowly defeated Democrat Jon Ossoff in the runoff vote, 51.8% to 48.2%. Handel succeeded Tom Price, who resigned from the seat following his confirmation as United States Secretary of Health and Human Services in the Trump administration. The runoff election was necessary when no individual candidate earned the majority of votes in the election on April 18. Ossoff received 48.1% of the vote in the first round, followed by Handel with 19.8%.

Georgia's state law requires the governor of Georgia to call for a special election to be held at least 30 days after a vacancy. Following Price's resignation, Governor Nathan Deal called for the special election to be held on April 18, with a filing window for prospective candidates from February 13 to 15, 2017. All candidates ran on one ballot, with a runoff election scheduled for the first- and second-place finishers, if no candidate received 50% of the vote. Neither Ossoff nor Handel received a majority, and despite Ossoff finishing nearly 30 points ahead in the first round, Handel nonetheless prevailed in the runoff election, though she would ultimately lose reelection in 2018 to Democrat Lucy McBath. Ossoff would later go on to be elected a United States senator, defeating incumbent David Perdue in the 2021 runoff election.

The election attracted exceptional national interest, with both major parties perceiving it as an opportunity to shape the political narrative prior to the 2018 midterm elections. The district has a history of favoring GOP House candidates by large margins, but Trump won it by just 1% in 2016, making Democrats hopeful to win a normally strong GOP district. A total of $50 million was spent as of the close of early-voting period on June 17, making it the most expensive House election in history. Of that, more than $40 million was spent on television and radio advertising alone, smashing past House election records. A very high number of voters—140,000—cast ballots during the runoff-election early-voting period.

== Candidates ==
=== Republican Party ===
==== Declared ====
- David Abroms, businessman
- Mohammad Ali Bhuiyan, economist
- Keith Grawert, former USAF pilot
- Bob Gray, businessman and Johns Creek City councilman
- Karen Handel, former secretary of state of Georgia, candidate for governor in 2010, and candidate for the U.S. Senate in 2014
- Judson Hill, former state senator
- Amy Kremer, tea party activist
- Bruce LeVell, businessman
- William Llop, certified public accountant and candidate for GA-11 in 2012 and 2016
- Dan Moody, former state senator
- Kurt Wilson, businessman

==== Withdrew ====
- Donnie Bolena, candidate for mayor of Sandy Springs in 2009
- S.M. Abu Zahed, aviation engineer

==== Declined ====
- John Albers, state senator
- Brandon Beach, state senator
- John Isakson Jr., real estate developer and son of U.S. Senator Johnny Isakson
- Cade Joiner, small business owner
- Jan Jones, state representative
- Chuck Martin, state representative
- Rusty Paul, mayor of Sandy Springs, former state senator and former chairman of the Georgia Republican Party
- Betty Price, state representative and wife of Tom Price
- Kelly Stewart, former Johns Creek City councilwoman

=== Democratic Party ===
==== Declared ====
- Ragin Edwards, sales senior manager
- Richard Keatley, college professor and former officer in the Navy
- Jon Ossoff, filmmaker, media executive, investigative journalist, former congressional aide
- Rebecca Quigg, physician
- Ron Slotin, former state senator and candidate for GA-04 in 1996

==== Withdrew ====
- Sally Harrell, former state representative (endorsed Jon Ossoff)
- Josh McLaurin, attorney (endorsed Jon Ossoff)

==== Declined ====
- Taylor Bennett, former state representative
- Scott Holcomb, state representative
- Rob Teilhet, former state representative and candidate for attorney general in 2010

=== Libertarian Party ===
==== Declined ====
- Chase Oliver

=== Independent ===
==== Declared ====
- Alexander Hernandez
- Andre Pollard, computer systems engineer

==== Withdrew ====
- Joseph Pond, plumber

== Special election ==
=== Predictions ===
Source	Ranking	As of
The Cook Political Report	Tossup	April 14, 2017

=== Endorsements ===
David Abroms
- William Kristol, political analyst and commentator, founder and editor of The Weekly Standard
- Austin Petersen, candidate for president of the United States in 2016
Bob Gray

Organizations

- Club for Growth
Judson Hill

Federal politicians

- Newt Gingrich, former speaker of the United States House of Representatives
- Marco Rubio, United States senator (R-FL)
Dan Moody

Federal politicians

- David Perdue, U.S. senator (R-GA)

=== Polling ===
Poll source	Date(s) administered	Sample size	Margin of error	David Abroms (R)	Bob Gray (R)	Karen Handel (R)	Judson Hill (R)	Bruce LeVell (R)	Dan Moody (R)	Jon Ossoff (D)	Ron Slotin (D)	Other	Undecided
ZPolitics/Clout Research (R)	April 14–15, 2017	453 LV	± 4.6%	3%	17%	15%	10%	1%	9%	41%	1%	1%	2%
Emerson College	April 13–15, 2017	324 LV	± 5.4%	2%	15%	17%	6%	0%	9%	43%	2%	3%	3%
WSB/Landmark Communications	April 12–13, 2017	500 LV	± 4.2%	–	9%	17%	8%	–	8%	45%	–	5%	7%
FOX 5 Atlanta/Opinion Savvy	April 13, 2017	437 LV	± 4.6%	1%	11%	21%	11%	0%	9%	42%	0%	2%	3%
Revily	April 10–12, 2017	485 LV	± 4.5%	–	16%	17%	7%	–	9%	45%	0%	1%	6%
RRH Elections/Decision Desk HQ	April 5–10, 2017	321 LV	± 5%	3%	12%	15%	10%	0%	11%	39%	4%	–	6%
Meeting Street Research (R-Moody)	April 4, 2017	400 LV	± 4.9%	–	–	12%	10%	–	12%	43%	–	14%	9%
WXIA-TV Atlanta/Survey USA	March 27 – April 2, 2017	503 LV	± 4.5%	2%	14%	15%	5%	1%	7%	43%	0%	7%	7%
MoveOn/Lake Research Partners (D)	March 26–28, 2017	350 LV	± 5.2%	–	7%	18%	8%	0%	7%	40%	1%	1%	19%
FOX 5 Atlanta/Opinion Savvy	March 22–23, 2017	462	± 4.5%	2%	10%	20%	10%	0.4%	8%	40%	1%	3%	6%
ZPolitics/Clout Research (R)	March 15–16, 2017	625 LV	± 3.7%	2%	16%	16%	9%	1%	5%	41%	3%	2%	6%
Trafalgar Group (R)	March 2–3, 2017	450+ LV	± 4.5%	—	13%	18%	8%	0%	2%	18%	3%	—	34%
ZPolitics/Clout Research (R)	February 17–18, 2017	694 LV	± 3.7%	—	11%	25%	9%	1%	2%	32%	—	3%	18%
Landmark/Rosetta Stone	December 1, 2016	500 LV	± 4.2%	—	—	22%	8%	—	—	—	—	14%	56%

=== Results ===
Georgia's 6th congressional district special election, 2017
Party	Candidate	Votes	%
Democratic	Jon Ossoff	92,673	48.12
Republican	Karen Handel	38,071	19.77
Republican	Bob Gray	20,802	10.80
Republican	Dan Moody	17,028	8.84
Republican	Judson Hill	16,870	8.76
Republican	Kurt Wilson	1,820	0.95
Republican	David Abroms	1,639	0.85
Democratic	Ragin Edwards	504	0.26
Democratic	Ron Slotin	491	0.25
Republican	Bruce LeVell	455	0.24
Republican	Mohammad Ali Bhuiyan	415	0.22
Republican	Keith Grawert	415	0.22
Republican	Amy Kremer	351	0.18
Republican	William Llop	326	0.17
Democratic	Rebecca Quigg	304	0.16
Democratic	Richard Keatley	229	0.12
Independent	Alexander Hernandez	121	0.06
Independent	Andre Pollard	55	0.03
Total votes		192,569	100.00
Plurality		54,602	28.35

== Runoff ==
On April 18, 2017, no candidate received 50% of the vote in the blanket primary ("jungle primary"). Ossoff led with about 48.1% of the vote, Republican candidate Karen Handel received 19.8%, and the remainder of votes were scattered for 16 other candidates. Because no candidate secured an absolute majority, the top two-vote-getters, Ossoff and Handel, competed in a runoff election on June 20, 2017. Ossoff won all but 1% of the Democratic vote, while the Republican vote was more heavily split. Republicans collectively won 51.2% of the overall vote.

Ossoff broke national fundraising records for a U.S. House candidate. In total, Ossoff's campaign raised more than $23 million, two-thirds of which was contributed by small-dollar donors nationwide. Ossoff's opponent, Karen Handel, and national Republican groups attacked Ossoff for raising significant small-dollar contributions from outside of Georgia, although Handel's campaign received the bulk of its support from super PACs and other outside groups, including those funded anonymously by so-called "dark money". Combined spending by the campaigns and outside groups on their behalf added up to over $55 million, which was the most expensive House Congressional election in U.S. history. During the campaign, Republican strategy focused on connecting Ossoff to House Democratic Leader Nancy Pelosi, a polarizing and unpopular figure; Ossoff declined to say whether he would, if elected, support Pelosi for Speaker of the House.

=== Predictions ===
Source	Ranking	As of
The Cook Political Report	Tossup	April 19, 2017
Inside Elections	Tossup	June 12, 2017

=== Endorsements ===
Karen Handel

Federal officials

- Mike Pence, vice president of the United States
- Donald Trump, president of the United States

U.S. cabinet and cabinet-level officials

- Sonny Perdue, U.S. secretary of agriculture and former governor of Georgia
- Tom Price, U.S. secretary of Health and Human services and former representative

U.S. senators

- Saxby Chambliss, former U.S. senator (R-GA)
- Ted Cruz, U.S. senator (R-TX)
- Johnny Isakson, U.S. senator (R-GA)
- David Perdue, U.S. senator (R-GA)
- Marco Rubio, U.S. senator (R-FL)

U.S. representatives

- Greg Gianforte, U.S. representative (R-MT)
- Barry Loudermilk, U.S. representative (R-GA)
- Kevin McCarthy, U.S. House majority leader (R-CA)
- Paul Ryan, U.S. House speaker (R-WI)

Governors

- Nathan Deal, governor of Georgia
- Mitt Romney, former governor of Massachusetts and 2012 presidential nominee

Statewide elected officials

- Mike Bowers, former attorney general of Georgia
- Tim Echols, public service commissioner

Local officeholders

- D.C. Aiken, former Alpharetta councilmember
- JoAnn Birrell, Cobb County commissioner
- Nancy Diamond, Roswell councilmember
- Steve Dorvee, former Roswell councilmember
- Chuck Eaton, public service commissioner
- Joe Gebbia, Brookhaven councilmember
- Jim Gilvin, Alpharetta councilmember
- Ashley Jenkins, former Sandy Springs councilmember
- Randall Johnson, former Johns Creek councilmember
- Mike Kenn, former Fulton County commission chair
- Arthur Lepchas, former Alpharetta mayor
- Joe Lockwood, Milton mayor
- Joe Longoria, Milton councilmember
- Bill Lusk, Milton councilmember
- Bates Mattison, Brookhaven mayor pro tem
- Karen Meinzen-McEnerny, former Sandy Springs councilmember
- Dan Merkel, Alpharetta councilmember
- Terry Nall, Dunwoody councilmember
- Bob Ott, Cobb County commissioner
- Chris Owens, Alpharetta mayor pro tem
- Rusty Paul, mayor of Sandy Springs, Georgia
- Michelle Penkara, member of the Tucker, Georgia City Council
- Donna Pittman, mayor of Doraville, Georgia
- Kristen Riley, former Roswell councilmember
- Jim Still, mayor of Mountain Park, Fulton County, Georgia
- Pam Tallmadge, Dunwoody councilmember
- Karen Thurman, Milton councilmember
- Honey Van De Kreke, Tucker councilmember
- Rebecca Chase Williams, former mayor of Brookhaven
- Becky Wynn, Roswell councilmember

Former candidates

- David Abroms, businessman
- Bob Gray, businessman and Johns Creek councilmember
- Judson Hill, former state senator
- Bruce LeVell, businessman

Organizations

- Georgia Chamber of Commerce
- NRA Political Victory Fund
- Susan B. Anthony List
- U.S. Chamber of Commerce
Jon Ossoff

Federal politicians

- Sanford Bishop, U.S. representative (D-GA)
- Julián Castro, former U.S. secretary of Housing and Urban Development
- Catherine Cortez Masto, U.S. senator (D-NV)
- Maggie Hassan, U.S. senator (D-NH)
- Hank Johnson, U.S. representative (D-GA)
- John Lewis, U.S. representative (D-GA)
- Tom Perez, chairman of Democratic National Committee and former U.S. secretary of Labor
- Bernie Sanders, U.S. senator (I-VT)
- David Scott, U.S. representative (D-GA)
- Eric Swalwell, U.S. representative (D-CA)
- Elizabeth Warren, U.S. senator (D-MA)

Statewide politicians

- Stacey Abrams, minority leader of the Georgia House of Representatives
- Roy Barnes, former governor of Georgia
- Sally Harrell, former state representative
- Jason Kander, former Missouri secretary of state (D-MO)

Celebrities

- Misha Collins, actor and former White House intern
- Anthony Fantano, music critic, video producer, journalist, and creator of The Needle Drop
- Christopher Gorham, actor
- Chelsea Handler, comedian and talk show host
- Samuel L. Jackson, actor and civil rights activist
- Rose McGowan, actress
- Alyssa Milano, actress and UNICEF Goodwill Ambassador

Organizations

- Democracy for America, progressive political action committee
- Democrats for 2020, liberal news feed
- End Citizens United, grassroots progressive public policy advocacy group and political action committee
- Friends of the Earth Action
- League of Conservation Voters
- National Jewish Democratic Council
- Pride Fund to End Gun Violence PAC, progressive political action committee that "supports candidates who will act on sensible gun policy reforms while championing LGBTQ safety and equality"

Websites

- Daily Kos, political news blog
- Moveon.org, progressive public policy advocacy group and political action committee

=== Debates ===
Complete video of first debate, June 8, 2017.

=== Polling ===
==== Averages ====
Model	Ossoff	Handel	Spread
HuffPost Pollster	49.3%	47.0%	Ossoff +2.3
RealClearPolitics	48.8%	49.0%	Handel +0.2
270toWin	49.4%	47.6%	Ossoff +1.8
Daily Kos	48.1%	48.2%	Handel +0.1
Plural Vote	49.8%	50.2%	Handel +0.4

==== Fundraising ====
Campaign finance reports as of May 31, 2017
Candidate	Raised	Spent	Cash on hand
Karen Handel (R)	$4,285,398	$3,069,138	$1,404,177
Jon Ossoff (D)	$23,600,861	$21,356,350	$1,068,251
Source: Federal Election Commission

==== Polls ====
Poll source	Date(s) administered	Sample size	Margin of error	Jon Ossoff (D)	Karen Handel (R)	Undecided
WSB/Landmark Communications	June 18, 2017	500	± 4.4%	49%	49%	2%
Trafalgar Group	June 17–18, 2017	1100	± 2.9%	49%	51%	1%
WSB/Landmark Communications	June 15, 2017	800	± 3.5%	50%	48%	2%
FOX 5 Atlanta/Opinion Savvy	June 14–15, 2017	537	± 4.2%	50%	49%	1%
Trafalgar Group	June 10–13, 2017	1100	± 2.9%	50%	47%	2%
SurveyUSA	June 7–11, 2017	700	± 4.5%	47%	47%	6%
AJC/Abt Associates	June 5–8, 2017	1000	± 4%	51%	44%	5%
WSB/Landmark Communications	June 6–7, 2017	420	± 4.8%	50%	47%	3%
WSB/Landmark Communications	May 30–31, 2017	500	± 4.4%	49%	48%	3%
SurveyUSA	May 16–20, 2017	549	± 4.3%	51%	44%	6%
Gravis Marketing	May 8–10, 2017	870	± 3.3%	47%	45%	8%
WSB/Landmark Communications	May 3–4, 2017	611	± 4.0%	47%	49%	4%
GBA Strategies/House Majority PAC (D)	April 29 – May 1, 2017	400	± 4.9%	50%	48%	2%
Anzalone Liszt Grove Research (D)	April 23–26, 2017	590	± 4.0%	48%	47%	5%
Emerson College	April 13–15, 2017	324	± 5.4%	47%	49%	4%
FOX 5 Atlanta/Opinion Savvy	April 13, 2017	407	± 4.6%	44%	42%	14%
Revily	April 10–12, 2017	485	± 4.5%	47%	46%	7%
Lake Research Partners	March 26–28, 2017	350	± 5.2%	45%	45%	10%
FOX 5 Atlanta/Opinion Savvy	March 22–23, 2017	449	± 4.5%	42%	41%	17%

Hypothetical polling

with Bob Gray

Poll source	Date(s) administered	Sample size	Margin of error	Jon Ossoff (D)	Bob Gray (R)	Undecided
Emerson College	April 13–15, 2017	324	± 5.4%	45%	50%	5%
FOX 5 Atlanta/Opinion Savvy	April 13, 2017	398	± 4.6%	46%	45%	9%
Revily	April 10–12, 2017	485	± 4.5%	47%	48%	4%
FOX 5 Atlanta/Opinion Savvy	March 22–23, 2017	433	± 4.5%	44%	42%	13%

with Judson Hill

Poll source	Date(s) administered	Sample size	Margin of error	Jon Ossoff (D)	Judson Hill (R)	Undecided
Emerson College	April 13–15, 2017	324	± 5.4%	45%	48%	7%
FOX 5 Atlanta/Opinion Savvy	April 13, 2017	391	± 4.6%	47%	44%	9%
FOX 5 Atlanta/Opinion Savvy	March 22–23, 2017	428	± 4.5%	44%	45%	11%

with Dan Moody

Poll source	Date(s) administered	Sample size	Margin of error	Jon Ossoff (D)	Dan Moody (R)	Undecided
Emerson College	April 13–15, 2017	324	± 5.4%	46%	49%	5%
FOX 5 Atlanta/Opinion Savvy	April 13, 2017	387	± 4.6%	45%	48%	7%
FOX 5 Atlanta/Opinion Savvy	March 22–23, 2017	421	± 4.5%	46%	44%	10%

=== Results ===

On June 20, 2017, Ossoff was defeated by Handel, 51.87% to 48.13%. Following reports of the election results, The New York Times characterized the race as "demoralizing for Democrats". This was as close as a Democrat had come to winning this district since it assumed its current configuration as a northern suburban district in 1992; previously, Democratic challengers had only won more than 40 percent of the vote twice. Handel later lost re-election to a full term on November 6, 2018, to Democratic challenger Lucy McBath, making her the first Democrat to represent the district in its present form. Ossoff later became the senior U.S. Senator for Georgia, defeating incumbent David Perdue in a 2021 runoff election.

Georgia's 6th congressional district special election (2017)
Party	Candidate	Votes	%	±%
Republican	Karen Handel	134,799	51.78%	−9.90%
Democratic	Jon Ossoff	125,517	48.22%	+9.90%
Total votes		260,316	100.0%	
Majority		9,282	3.57%	−19.8%
Turnout		260,455	58.16%	
Republican hold				

=== County results ===
Vote breakdown by county
	Karen Handel Republican		Jon Ossoff Democrat		Margin		Total
County	Votes	%	Votes	%	Votes	%	Votes
Cobb	45,688	57.98%	33,114	42.02%	12,574	15.96%	78,802
DeKalb	24,117	41.55%	33,928	58.45%	9,811	16.90%	58,045
Fulton	64,994	52.64%	58,475	47.36%	6,519	5.28%	123,469

== See also ==
- List of special elections to the United States House of Representatives
- 2016 United States House of Representatives elections in Georgia
