= Amy Kremer =

American political activist

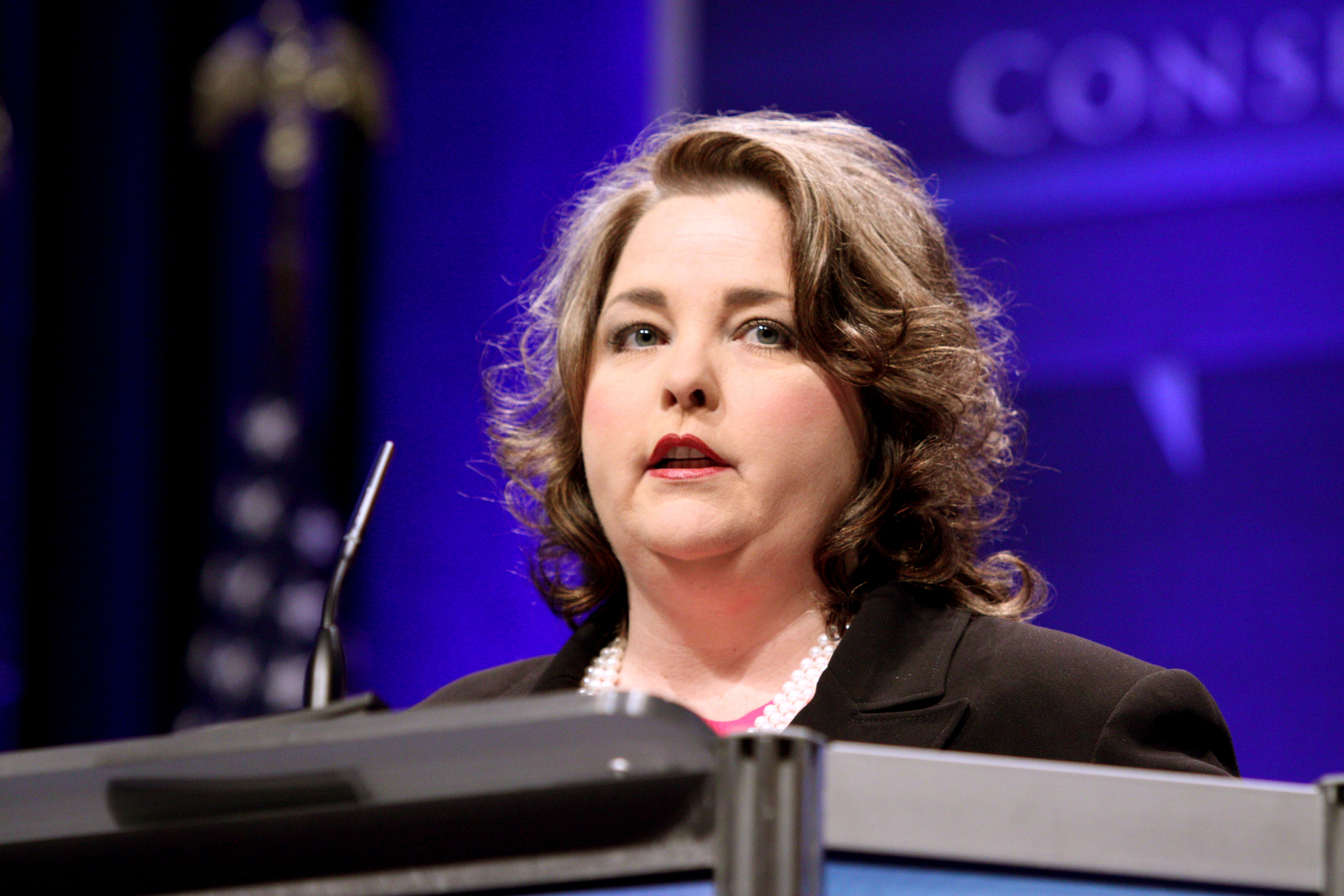

Republican National Committeewoman from Georgia
- Incumbent
- Assumed office 2024

Personal details
- Education: Auburn University

Amy Kremer (born 1970 or 1971) is an American political activist known for her roles in the Tea Party movement and as a supporter of Donald Trump. She became involved in the Tea Party movement in 2009 and campaigned as part of the Tea Party Express until 2014. During the 2016 presidential election she was a co-founder of two political action committees supporting Trump's campaign, and following Trump's loss in the 2020 presidential election she supported attempts to overturn the election result. In 2017 she unsuccessfully ran for the U.S. House of Representatives in a special election in Georgia's 6th congressional district as a Republican.

In January 2021, Kremer's organization Women for America First hosted a Stop the Steal rally in Washington, D.C., that culminated in the U.S. Capitol attack by Trump's supporters. She and ten others affiliated with the group were subpoenaed by the House Select Committee on the January 6 Attack in September 2021.

== Early life and career ==
Kremer attended Auburn University. She worked for Delta Air Lines as a flight attendant, but gave up her job to focus on raising her daughter. She became politically active in the Tea Party movement through Twitter and was involved in organising the first Tea Party protests in 2009. She wrote a blog which she used to publish the false claim that Barack Obama was not born in the United States and to express disappointment at Congress's certification of the 2008 presidential election result. She later described herself as having been "just a mom who was sick and fed up with what was going on in Washington." She was a founding member of Tea Party Patriots (TPP), but defected to Tea Party Express (TPE) in October 2009. Following her departure, TPP filed a lawsuit against Kremer alleging she had tried to prevent others from accessing the group's collective resources. After 2009 Kremer's daughter Kylie Jane Kremer became increasingly involved in her mother's political activism.

== Tea Party Express (2009–2014) ==
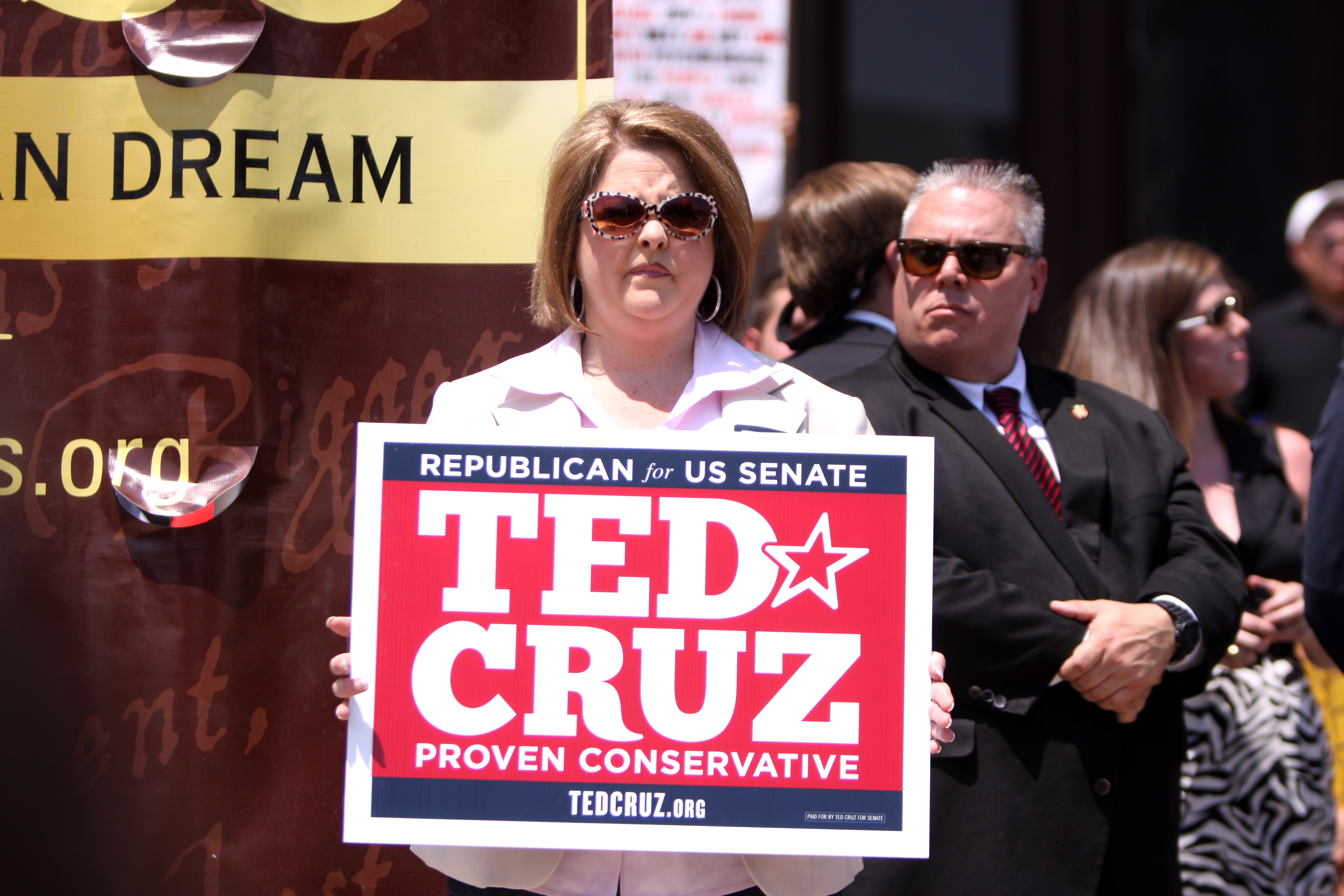
Kremer campaigning for Ted Cruz in the 2012 U.S. Senate election in Texas

Soon after joining Tea Party Express, Kremer urged the organization to support Scott Brown's campaign for the U.S. Senate in Massachusetts. During the 2010 midterm elections Kremer campaigned for candidates including Joe Miller, who ran for the U.S. Senate in Alaska. She also endorsed Tom Tancredo, the American Constitution Party candidate for governor of Colorado. In October 2010, The Daily Telegraph named her the "most influential" person in the Tea Party movement.

In a 2011 appearance on The Colbert Report, Kremer said the U.S. federal government raised "enough tax revenue to service our debt, pay for Medicare and Medicaid and Social Security, and then still have about $300 [billion] or $400 billion left over." PolitiFact.com rated this statement "Half True", noting that Kremer's calculations ignored defense and homeland security spending and mandatory programs. In June 2011 Kremer said TPE would support Mitt Romney if he became the Republican nominee in the 2012 presidential election. A co-founder of Tea Party Patriots rejected Kremer's remarks, saying "a pledge of allegiance to the Republican Party, or any other party, violates what the Tea Party movement is all about and is completely out of touch with grassroots Americans". In the 2012 elections TPE endorsed U.S. Senate candidate Richard Mourdock in Indiana; in September 2011 Kremer described Mourdock as a "true conservative."

During a September 2012 appearance on CNN's Starting Point, host Soledad O'Brien and others criticised Kremer for wondering whether President Barack Obama "loves America." In 2013 Kremer said that U.S. Senator Saxby Chambliss of Georgia, a member of the Republican Party, voted "more with Democrats than with conservatives." PolitiFact.com rated this claim as "False", citing an analysis by The Washington Post that found Chambliss voted with fellow Republicans 91 percent of the time in 2011 and 2012. Kremer spent much of the summer 2013 congressional recess on a national tour intended to convince Republicans to support defunding the Patient Protection and Affordable Care Act.

Kremer resigned from Tea Party Express in April 2014. She described the split as amicable and attributed her departure to a desire to focus on Matt Bevin's campaign for the U.S. Senate in Kentucky, instead of Curt Clawson's campaign in Florida's 19th congressional district.

== 2016 presidential election ==
As of February 2016, Kremer was the chair of TrumPAC, a super PAC supporting Donald Trump's campaign in the 2016 presidential election. TrumPAC later changed its name to Great America PAC. Great America PAC was founded by Kremer and William Doddridge, the CEO of The Jewelry Exchange. Kremer resigned from Great America PAC in May 2016, shortly after Trump became the presumptive Republican presidential nominee, due to decisions which she claimed had been made without her input.

In June 2016 Kremer, along with Kathryn Serkes and Ann Stone, founded Women Vote Trump, a new super PAC that aimed to raise at least $30 million to support Trump's campaign. Stone said the group would organize volunteers and advertise across the United States. At an event the following month Kremer said "People assume that just because [Democratic presidential nominee] Hillary Clinton is a woman that I'm going to support her. That's an insult to my intelligence. I have the ability to think on my own." Kremer made appearances on CNN, Fox News and MSNBC to promote the PAC. In August 2016 Kremer claimed on CNN that Clinton was suffering from chronic traumatic encephalopathy, a degenerative disease found in people who have suffered repeated blows to the head. Federal Election Commission records showed that Women Vote Trump, which changed its name to Women Vote Smart in order to comply with regulations that prohibit the use of candidates' names, had only raised $26,813, had spent $20,000, and was nearly $20,000 in debt as of March 2017. Kremer said the group "had commitments from people and then people didn't come through," but that it was "definitely out there being active with the grassroots and engaging people."

== 2017 congressional campaign ==
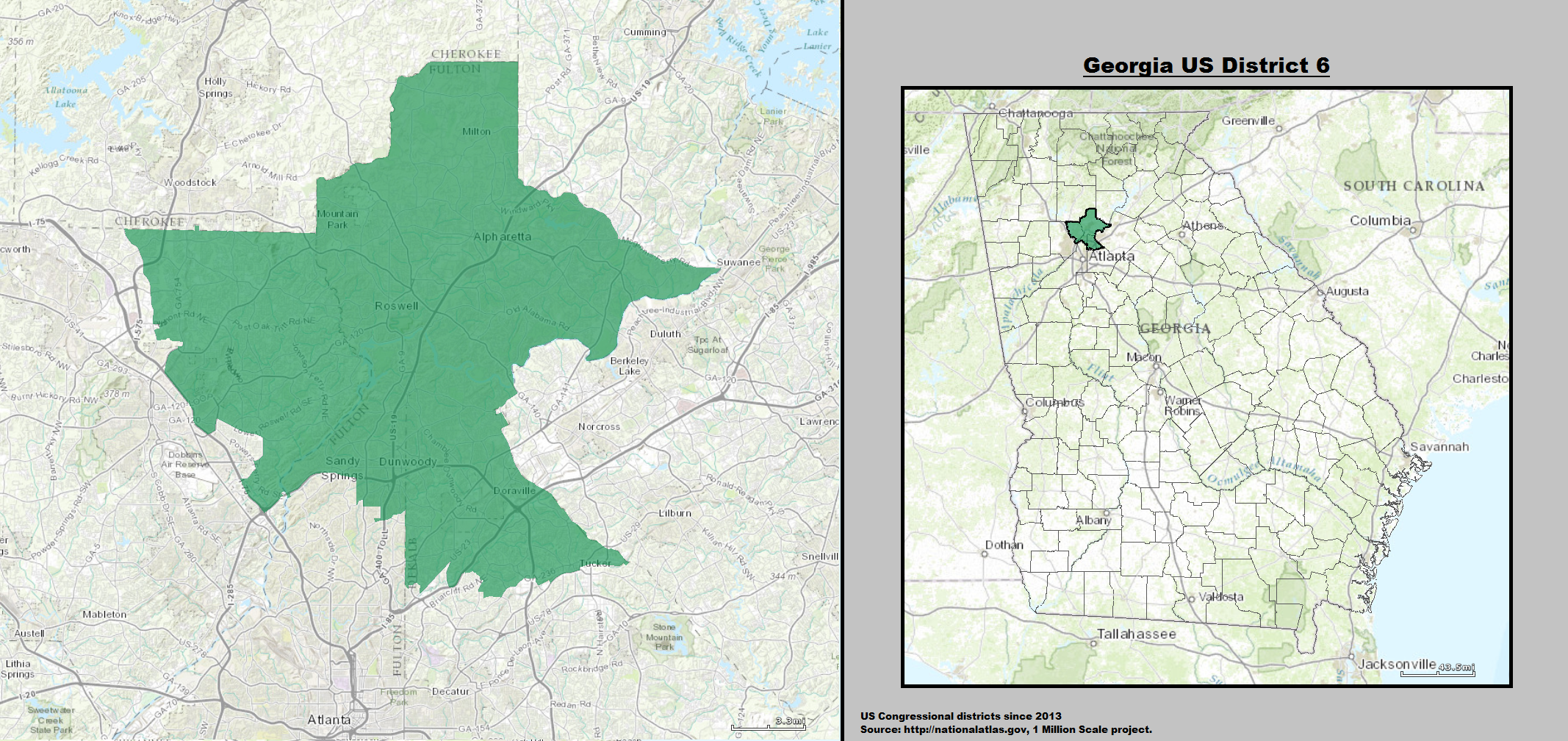
Georgia's 6th congressional district

In 2017, Kremer ran as a Republican in the special election in Georgia's 6th congressional district, which was vacant following Representative Tom Price's confirmation as U.S. Secretary of Health and Human Services. In an April 2017 interview, Kremer said "the biggest issue facing the Sixth District" was its "stagnant economy", which she suggested be fixed by cutting "government regulations that stifle job growth", cutting "government waste", creating "a pro-growth environment", and lowering individual and corporate taxes. She said her priorities in Congress would be employment and the economy, national security, repealing and replacing the Patient Protection and Affordable Care Act, and taking care of veterans. Kremer said she should be elected because she had "carried the values of the 6th District" with her as she "worked tirelessly to preserve freedom and liberty through electing conservatives like Ted Cruz, Rand Paul, Marco Rubio and many others". The radio and television host Sean Hannity and the Tea Party activist Katrina Pierson endorsed Kremer's campaign.

In March 2017 Kremer offered supporters who donated to her campaign the opportunity to win an AR-15 style rifle. Kremer explained: "We are very pro-2nd Amendment not only in Georgia but in the south." In an email to supporters, Kremer criticized a decision by the United States Court of Appeals for the Fourth Circuit that affirmed Maryland's ban on military-style "assault weapons" (see Gun laws in Maryland) and called on supporters to "show these progressive judges that we will not surrender the rights granted by God and preserved in the U.S. Constitution".

Greg Bluestein of The Atlanta Journal-Constitution observed in March 2017 that Kremer's campaign had "struggled to gain traction" against better-known and better-funded Republican candidates. In March 2017 Kremer's entire campaign staff resigned after she allegedly only raised around $2,500 and was unable to pay her campaign manager and at least six other staff members. One member of staff who resigned had been staying at Kremer's house and contacted police after Kremer allegedly changed the locks and prevented him from retrieving his belongings. The staff members who resigned were subsequently hired by the campaign of Bob Gray, another Republican candidate in the special election.

In the primary election on April 18, 2017, Kremer received 351 votes, or 0.18 percent of the total vote tally, and did not advance to the runoff election.

== Women for Trump, Women for America First and Women Vote Smart ==
In June 2018, Kremer, who by then was a co-founder of Women for Trump, was interviewed on CNN, where she insisted that family separations at the U.S.–Mexico border were occurring at the same level for both the Obama administration and the Trump administration. She claimed that Jeh Johnson, the Obama administration's United States Secretary of Homeland Security, said that "they were separating families". However, CNN played the actual quote from Johnson, who had said: "There's no policy or practice, at least on my watch, to separate women, parents from their children", although he was sure there still were "individual cases for reasons of health or safety" of such happenings. Kremer's on-the-spot reaction was to insist that her quote of Johnson "happened", although later she tweeted that she had "conflated 2 different articles with quotes from 2 different Obama" administration officials.

In 2019, Kremer and her daughter Kylie founded Women for America First, which organized a protest against the impeachment of Donald Trump in Washington, D.C., in October of that year. In April 2020 the group organized several protests against stay-at-home orders implemented in response to the COVID-19 pandemic. In the fall of 2020, Women for America First campaigned in support of Amy Coney Barrett's nomination to the U.S. Supreme Court.

Kremer became treasurer of Women Vote Smart in February 2019. As of October 2021, Women Vote Smart had failed to submit six required reports to the Federal Election Commission (FEC) since February 2019, resulting in the organization owing $20,000 to the FEC. As of February 2022, Kremer and Women Vote Smart owed at least $49,000 in past-due fines to the FEC.

== 2020 presidential election ==
During the counting of votes following the 2020 United States presidential election, Women for America First founded a Facebook group titled "Stop the Steal", in which Kremer was a moderator. The group's membership grew to 320,000 within 22 hours. Facebook removed the group on November 5, after members posted death threats and called for a civil war, and described it as "organized around the delegitimization of the election process". Later that month, Kremer and Women for America First organized a protest in Washington, D.C., in support of Trump and his refusal to concede after losing the election. In her speech at the event, Kremer criticized Facebook, Eventbrite and Mailchimp for removing listings for events she had organized. Kremer spoke at events on a two-week bus tour sponsored, in part, by My Pillow to support Trump's attempts to overturn the election and encourage attendance at a rally in Washington, D.C., on January 6 which preceded the storming of the U.S. Capitol. This tour ended December 14, 2020.

Women for America First then organized a new bus tour to encourage the attendance at a rally in Washington, D.C., on January 6 which preceded the storming of the U.S. Capitol. As part of this bus tour, Kremer visited the Tactical Response marksman training center in Nashville, Tennessee, owned by James Yeager, where she and others taped an episode of Yeager's YouTube show "Tactical Response".

On January 6, 2021, Women for America First hosted an event in Washington, D.C. referred to as "March to Save America." The executive director of Women for Trump, Kylie Jane Kremer, was listed as the person in charge on the rally's permit. The organization's Facebook page called on supporters to be part of a "caravan" to Washington for the event. Kremer gave a speech at the event, in which she denounced Facebook's removal of the "Stop the Steal" group, alleged electoral fraud had occurred, and encouraged Republican members of Congress to vote to challenge the election result. She argued that the Tea Party movement had "grew and morphed into" the Make America Great Again movement. As Women for America First noted in a post-event press release, the event was followed by the storming of the United States Capitol. Following the riot, Women for America First issued a statement by Kremer which condemned the violence, saying it had been instigated by a "handful of bad actors".

Kremer said in July 2021 that she would "gladly" testify before a commission on the events of January 6. In September 2021, Kremer and ten others affiliated with Women for America First were subpoenaed by the House Select Committee on the January 6 Attack. The subpoenas stated the Select Committee would seek to examine the organization's relationship with the Trump administration in planning the events of January 6. The subpoena required Kremer to submit documents to the Select Committee by October 13, 2021, and sit for a deposition by November 3. As of October 21, 2021, Kremer was co-operating with the Select Committee's investigation. In September 2022, Kremer said Women for America First had received a grand jury subpoena relating to the U.S. Department of Justice's investigation into the Capitol attack.

== 2022–2026 ==
Following Mo Brooks' loss to Katie Britt in the Republican U.S. Senate primary in Alabama in June 2022, Kremer said Trump's endorsement of Britt indicated he was "disconnected from the [Republican] base".

In the October 2023 election for Speaker of the United States House of Representatives, Kremer supported Jim Jordan's campaign and called on supporters to contact members of Congress to ask them to support Jordan.

In November 2023, Kremer testified in support of Trump in a Colorado lawsuit brought by voters who argued that Trump was ineligible to hold office under the Fourteenth Amendment to the United States Constitution due to his role in the January 2021 Capitol attack. In her testimony, Kremer called those in attendance at the January 6 rally "freedom-loving citizens", and said she had seen nothing indicating that they were likely to become violent.

In May 2024, Kremer ran for one of two seats representing Georgia on the Republican National Committee (RNC). She argued that the RNC had not done enough to aid Trump and his supporters, including 16 Georgia Republicans prosecuted for falsely claiming to be presidential electors in 2020. Kremer was elected alongside incumbent Jason Thompson. In August 2025, Kremer supported Joe Gruters' successful campaign to become chair of the RNC.

== Humans First ==
In May 2026, Kremer was one of a number of Trump allies who signed a letter urging his administration to test and approve powerful artificial intelligence (AI) models prior to public release. Kremer said she supported the passage of a law regulating artificial intelligence, which she described as "the most powerful technology in the world and in human history".

As of June 2026, Kremer was chair of Humans First, a conservative advocacy group opposed to the AI and technology industries. Humans First was funded in part by the Center for AI Safety. Kremer said she was motivated to campaign against AI after becoming aware of cases in which chatbots may have contributed to suicide or self-harm, and saw similarities between protests against data centers and the Tea Party movement. Kremer and Humans First organized protests in several U.S. cities in July 2026. Kremer said opposition to data centers was a nonpartisan issue and predicted it would be a major issue in the 2026 midterm elections and the 2028 United States presidential election.

In Autumn 2026, Humans First organized a bus tour to campaign against the construction of AI data centers, in opposition to Trump's support for the industry. As part of the bus tour, events were held in states hosting important midterm elections, and an event was held in Dallas, Texas, to coincide with the 2026 Republican National Convention held in that city. The bus tour visited 35 cities and concluded in the San Francisco Bay Area in October 2026.

In interviews, Kremer has said she views opposition to AI as an sentiment that blura boundaries between the political left and right. She has identified deaths linked to AI chatbots and the impact of AI on employment as particular concerns. Kremer has said that Humans First did not support a moratorium on data centers, but rather supports expanded regulation and a right for communities to decide whether to host data centers.
