= Ron Slotin =

American politician

Member of the Georgia Senate from the 39th district
- In office 1993–1996
- Preceded by: Hildred W. Shumake
- Succeeded by: Vincent Fort

Personal details
- Born: 1963 or 1964 (age 62–63)
- Party: Democratic
- Education: University of Georgia
- Profession: Chief Marketing Officer

Ronald D. Slotin (born 1963/64) is an American politician from the state of Georgia. He served in the Georgia State Senate, opting not to run for reelection in 1996 so that he could run for the United States House of Representatives seat for Georgia's 4th congressional district. He ran in the 2017 special election to represent Georgia's 6th congressional district in the United States House of Representatives, but was unsuccessful.

Slotin is Jewish.
