= Georgia House Bill 87 =

Anti-illegal immigration law in the U.S. state of Georgia

Georgia General Assembly
- Long title: Illegal Immigration Reform and Enforcement Act of 2011
- Passed: April 14, 2011
- Signed by: Nathan Deal
- Signed: May 13, 2011
- Commenced: July 1, 2011

Legislative history
- Bill title: House Bill 87
- First reading: January 27, 2011
- Second reading: January 31, 2011
- Third reading: March 3, 2011
- Status: Current legislation

Georgia House Bill 87 (official title: Illegal Immigration Reform and Enforcement Act of 2011; abbreviated HB 87) is an anti-illegal immigration act passed by the Georgia General Assembly on April 14, 2011, and signed into law by Georgia governor Nathan Deal on May 13, 2011. It took effect on July 1 of that year. The law was authored by Peachtree City Republican state representative Matt Ramsey, and was partly based on Arizona's SB 1070 bill that had passed the previous year.

== Sponsors ==
In the Georgia House of Representatives, HB 87 was co-sponsored by Matt Ramsey, Rich Golick, Katie M. Dempsey, Rick Austin, Stephen Allison, and Ed Lindsey. In the Georgia State Senate, it was sponsored by Bill Hamrick.

== Provisions ==
HB 87 requires businesses in Georgia with more than 10 employees to use E-Verify to verify that prospective employees are eligible to work in the United States legally. The bill allows police in the state to attempt to determine the immigration status of some suspects. It also makes the intentional transportation of undocumented immigrants while a crime is being committed punishable by a fine of up to $1,000 and a prison sentence of up to a year. In addition, it punishes undocumented workers convicted of using fake identification to gain employment with up to 15 years in prison and up to a $250,000 fine.

== Similarity to Arizona's SB 1070 ==
Commentators noted that HB 87 was similar to other anti-illegal immigration laws that had recently been passed in other U.S. states, such as Arizona SB 1070. Some of HB 87's critics dubbed it a "copycat" of SB 1070, a claim that PolitiFact rated "half true" because, although the two laws are similar, the authors of HB 87 tried to address concerns about the constitutionality of such legislation. For instance, HB 87 merely allows police to check the immigration status of suspects, whereas SB 1070 required them to do so.

== Reactions ==
When HB 87 was signed into law, it was widely described as one of the toughest such laws in the country. Multiple organizations, including the American Civil Liberties Union (ACLU) and the Southern Poverty Law Center (SPLC), also publicly raised the possibility of suing Georgia over the law. The bill was also criticized by the leaders of the Leadership Conference on Civil and Human Rights and the Georgia Latino Alliance for Human Rights. The government of Mexico also criticized Deal for signing the bill into law, saying in a statement that "The legislators and state executive ignored the many contributions of the immigrant community to the economy and society of Georgia." Some critics, including Azadeh N. Shahshahani and Wade Henderson, criticized the bill on the basis that it would invite racial profiling of Latinos and other people of color. Other critics also criticized the law because they thought it would adversely affect trust in the police among immigrants.

Supporters of the bill generally argued that it would benefit Georgia taxpayers by reducing the economic burdens associated with providing for undocumented immigrants in the state. Support for the bill came from conservative groups that support strict immigration laws, including Americans for Immigration Control, whose spokesman, Phil Kent, said that the bill was about protecting taxpayers from the costs of illegal immigration. Kent told CNN that "We just want to make sure that people are welcome here and that they come here legally. And then we can cut back on the illegal immigration." The bill was also supported by Mark Krikorian of the Center for Immigration Studies, who said that in passing it, Georgia "...seems to have addressed the top-priority matters a state can deal with," and by Catherine Davis, legislative director for the Network of Politically Active Christians, who told the Atlanta Journal-Constitution that the bill "will stop unscrupulous behavior."

== Effects ==
HB 87 has since been criticized for allegedly having a negative impact on Georgia's economy, especially in the agricultural sector, because it decreased the number of undocumented workers who were available to work on farms in Georgia. A 2011 University of Georgia study showed that after the law, Georgia experienced a labor shortage of over 5,000 farm workers, which resulted in $140 million in crop losses. Similarly, according to the 2012 Georgia Ag Forecast, Georgia experienced an agricultural labor shortage of almost 50% after HB 87 was passed. An Atlanta Journal-Constitution survey, also conducted in 2011, estimated that farmers in Georgia would be short by about 11,000 workers during the upcoming season. When Jason Carter was running for governor of Georgia in the 2014 election, he criticized Deal for signing the law, saying that it had resulted in an "economic disaster" for the state and noting that he had voted against it in the state legislature. Deal responded that Georgians believed it was important to enforce the law, and that the bill had served to remind the federal government how important it was to address the issue of undocumented immigration.

Some researchers have also expressed concern that the law may adversely affect public health among Hispanic immigrants in Georgia. For instance, a 2013 study found that visits to the pediatric emergency department among Hispanics in Georgia decreased after the law was implemented, while the acuity of these visits tended to increase; in contrast, no other group in Georgia saw these trends during the same time period.

== Protests ==
Prior to Governor Deal signing HB 87 into law, numerous protesters gathered outside his office at the Georgia State Capitol, and the group Southerners on New Ground called for a boycott of the state if the bill was enacted. On July 2, 2011, a rally took place outside the State Capitol to protest the law; the size of the crowd was estimated at between 8,000 and 14,000.

== Legal challenges ==
On June 2, 2011, the ACLU, the SPLC, the Asian Law Caucus, and the National Immigration Law Center filed a lawsuit challenging HB 87, arguing that it was preempted by federal law and was unconstitutional. In March 2013, the United States Court of Appeals for the Eleventh Circuit issued a permanent injunction which blocked multiple provisions of the law, including section 7, which made it illegal to transport or harbor undocumented immigrants while they were committing another crime.
