= Safe Carry Protection Act =

The Safe Carry Protection Act (House Bill 60, also known as the Guns Everywhere Bill) is a law in the U.S. state of Georgia that dictates where firearms may be carried by residents of the state. It also allows residents with a permit to carry a concealed weapon to bring firearms into "bars, churches, school zones, government buildings and certain parts of airports." The bill passed the Georgia General Assembly, passing the House of Representatives by a vote of 112-58 and the Senate by 37-18. The bill received support from the Republican and Democratic candidates in the 2014 gubernatorial election: incumbent Nathan Deal and State Senator Jason Carter.

== Specifics ==
The law permits churches to disallow firearms. Persons found in possession are subject to a $100 fine. Government buildings without security (libraries for example) by default allow guns, while firearms may be carried into a bar by a licensed gun owner unless it is prohibited by the bar owner. People found carrying a gun into a bar where the owner prohibits them may be charged with trespassing. There was no change to the prohibition of carrying a gun on a college campus, however the fine for being in possession was reduced to $100. While permitted within airports and the Transportation Security Administration checkpoint lines, firearms are still not permitted within the secure area. The law also reduces the age required to carry a firearm from 21 to 18 for serving or honorably-discharged members of the armed forces who have completed basic training. School staff are permitted to carry firearms at elementary and high schools at the discretion of the school district. Databases listing residents with a concealed carry permit will not be maintained, and police cannot stop people to verify if they have a permit. According to its critics, the law also allows anyone, even those who cannot legally possess a gun (such as convicted felons), to claim a defense under the state's stand-your-ground law.

== Disallowments ==
Retailer Target has announced that their stores will not allow customers carrying guns, as it is at "odds with the family-friendly shopping and work experience we strive to create". Mayor of Atlanta Kasim Reed mandated that all public city buildings would not permit firearms, "with the exception of certain public safety officials and employees". Despite the law, Atlanta city employees will not be permitted to carry firearms while at work, or store firearms in their vehicles in secured city parking facilities.

== See also ==
- Gun laws in Georgia
