= Senator Echols =

Senator Echols may refer to:

- Drew Echols (fl. 2020s), Georgia State Senate
- Edward Echols (1849–1914), Virginia State Senate
- M. Patton Echols (1925–2012), Virginia State Senate
- Odis Echols (1930–2013), New Mexico State Senate
- R. E. Echols (fl. 1900s–1910s), Oklahoma State Senate
- Robert Milner Echols (1798–1847), Georgia State Senate
- Shelly Echols (born 1979), Georgia State Senate
