= Lauren McDonald =

American politician (born 1968)

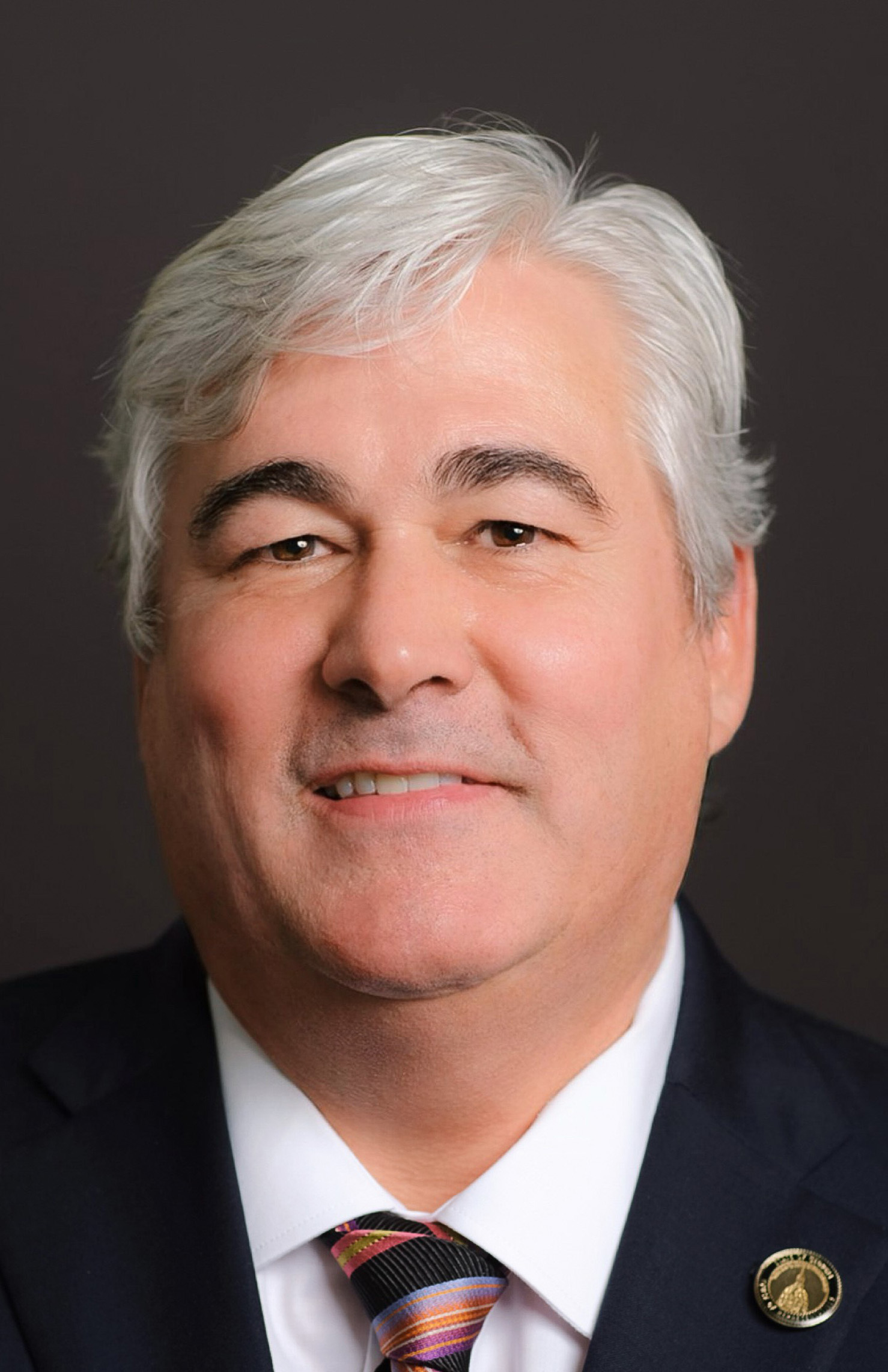

Member of the Georgia House of Representatives from the 26th district
- Incumbent
- Assumed office January 11, 2021
- Preceded by: Marc Morris

Personal details
- Born: Lauren Wylie McDonald; August 10, 1968 (age 57) Commerce, Georgia, U.S.
- Party: Republican
- Spouse: Claire
- Education: University of Georgia (BA); Gupton-Jones College (AS)
- Website: Official website

Lauren Wylie McDonald III (born August 10, 1968) is an American politician from Georgia. McDonald is a Republican member of Georgia House of Representatives for District 26.

== Early life ==
McDonald was born in Commerce, Georgia and graduated high school at The McCallie School in Chattanooga, Tennessee. Afterward, he earned a Bachelor of Arts in Political Science at The University of Georgia and an associate degree in Mortuary Science from Gupton-Jones College.

== Professional career ==
McDonald is the owner of McDonald & Son Funeral Home in Cumming, Georgia, which opened in 1997.

== Gallery ==
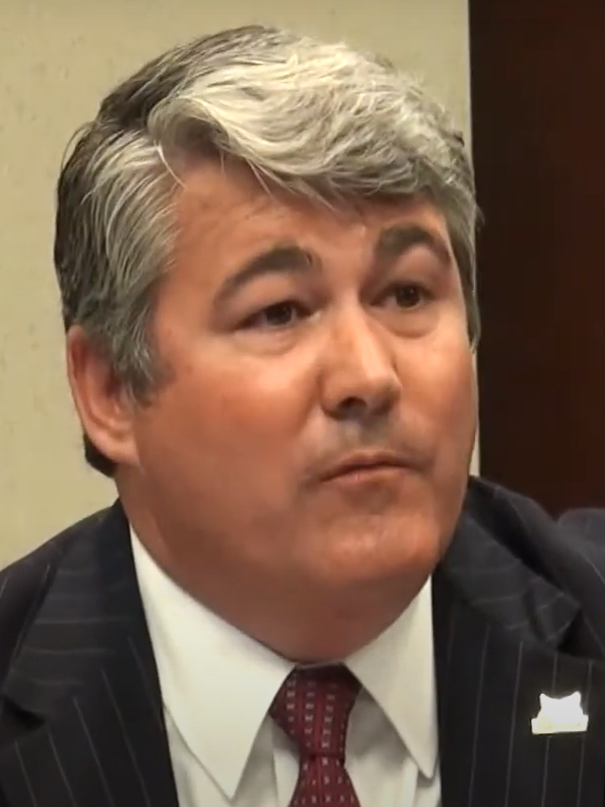
McDonald at a Georgia State Senate debate in 2014
