= Butch Miller =

Butch Miller may refer to:

- Butch Miller (racing driver) (born 1952)
- Butch Miller (wrestler) (1944–2023), New Zealand professional wrestler
- Butch Miller (politician), state senator from Georgia (U.S. state)
