= Gun laws in Georgia =

Gun laws in Georgia may refer to:

- Gun laws in Georgia (U.S. state); or
- Gun laws in Georgia (country).

== See also ==
- Georgia (disambiguation)
