= Butch Miller (politician) =

American politician (born 1956)

President pro tempore of the Georgia State Senate
- In office January 8, 2018 – January 9, 2023
- Preceded by: David Shafer
- Succeeded by: John F. Kennedy

Member of the Georgia State Senate from the 49th district
- In office May 20, 2010 – January 9, 2023
- Preceded by: Lee Hawkins
- Succeeded by: Shelly Echols

Personal details
- Born: Cecil Terrell Miller; November 24, 1956 (age 69) Macon, Georgia, U.S.
- Party: Republican
- Spouse: Teresa Carey (1982–present)
- Children: 3
- Education: University of North Georgia (BA)

Cecil Terrell "Butch" Miller (born November 24, 1956) is an American politician. A Republican, he was a member of the Georgia State Senate from 2010 to 2023, elected from the 49th district. Miller unsuccessfully sought the Republican nomination in the 2022 Georgia lieutenant gubernatorial election.

== Early life and education ==
Miller was born in Macon, Georgia, on November 24, 1956. He was the son of Dr. Cecil L. Miller and Mac Miller. His father was a physician in Buford, where he grew up. He earned a Bachelor of Arts degree from the North Georgia College & State University.

== Career ==
In 1993, Miller started working at Milton Martin Honda in Gainesville, Georgia. He became a co-owner in 1997. Miller has been chairman of the Georgia Automobile Dealer's Association as well as the National Automobile Dealer's Association.

=== Georgia Senate ===
Miller became a state senator in 2010 for Georgia's 49th Senate district. He was chosen as a Republican Senate floor leader in 2012, working to advance the agenda of Governor Nathan Deal, a close political ally. Miller was the Republican Senate Caucus chairman from 2013 to 2014 and a floor leader again from 2015 to 2016.

After Joe Biden won the 2020 presidential election in Georgia and Donald Trump refused to concede while falsely claiming fraud, Miller requested a performance review of the top election official in Fulton County, despite no legitimate questions about the accuracy of results.

In March 2021, during the state legislative session, Lieutenant Governor Geoff Duncan refused to call to the floor Senate Bill 202, an overhaul of Georgia election law introduced as part of Republican efforts to restrict voting following the 2020 presidential election. Miller sponsored SB 202, which limited vote-by-mail, restricted access to ballot drop boxes, and reduced the timeline for runoff elections. When Duncan exited the floor and Miller became the presiding officer, he called SB 202 to the floor for a vote which passed the Senate by a vote of 32–20. In December 2021, Miller introduced new legislation that would prohibit ballot drop boxes entirely.

In an internal leadership election in 2020 among state Senate Republicans, Miller defeated Burt Jones.

In 2022, Miller called for an amendment to the Georgia Constitution to ban non-citizens from voting, although voting by non-citizens was already illegal in Georgia.

=== 2022 lieutenant governor election ===
In May 2021, Miller announced his candidacy for lieutenant governor of Georgia in the 2022 election. The seat was an open seat, as incumbent Republican Geoff Duncan decided not to seek another term. Miller enjoyed strong support from business interests, receiving $2 million in campaign contributions in the first five weeks after he announced. While Miller raised more money from contributors than Burt Jones, his main primary rival, Jones' campaign was better-funded, as Jones loaned his campaign $2 million of his own money.

In the May 2022 Republican primary election, Jones defeated Miller, with Jones receiving 50.1% of the vote, Miller 31.1%, Mack McGregor 11.3%, and Jeanne Seaver 7.5%. Of Georgia's 159 counties, Jones received the most votes in 153 counties, and Miller received the most votes in six counties.

== Personal life ==
Miller married Teresa Carey. They had three sons. Their eldest son died in 2001 from a mitochondrial disease with symptoms similar to cerebral palsy. Miller is a Baptist.

Georgia State Senate
Preceded by David Shafer	President pro tempore of the Georgia Senate; 2018–2023	Succeeded by John Kennedy
