= Georgia's 26th House of Representatives district =

State district in Georgia, USA

Georgia's 26th State House of Representatives district
Representative
Lauren McDonald; R–Cumming
- Demographics: 86.0% White; 1.3% Black; 7.1% Hispanic; 3.7% Asian
- Population: 59,492

District 26 elects one member of the Georgia House of Representatives. It contains parts of Forsyth County.

== Members ==
- Geoff Duncan (2013–2017)
- Marc Morris (2017–2021)
- Lauren McDonald (since 2021)
