= Jane Hemmer =

American politician (born 1947)

Member of the Georgia State Senate from the 49th district
- In office January 11, 1993 – January 9, 1995
- Preceded by: Nathan Deal
- Succeeded by: Casey Cagle

Personal details
- Born: March 23, 1947 (age 78) Gainesville, Georgia, U.S.
- Political party: Democratic
- Spouse: John Lee Hemmer Jr. (m. 1968)
- Children: 2
- Education: Augusta University (BS)

Jane Reynolds Hemmer (born March 23, 1947) is an American politician. A member of the Democratic Party, she was the first woman ever elected to the Hall County, Georgia board of commissioners in 1986. She served until her election to the Georgia State Senate in 1992, where she succeeded then-Democrat Nathan Deal, who had successfully run for a seat in the United States House of Representatives. She lost her race for re-election to 28-year old Casey Cagle in the Republican Revolution of 1994.

Georgia State Senate
Preceded by Nathan Deal	Member of the Georgia State Senate from the 49th district 1993–1995	Succeeded by Casey Cagle
