= Casey Cagle =

American politician (born 1966)

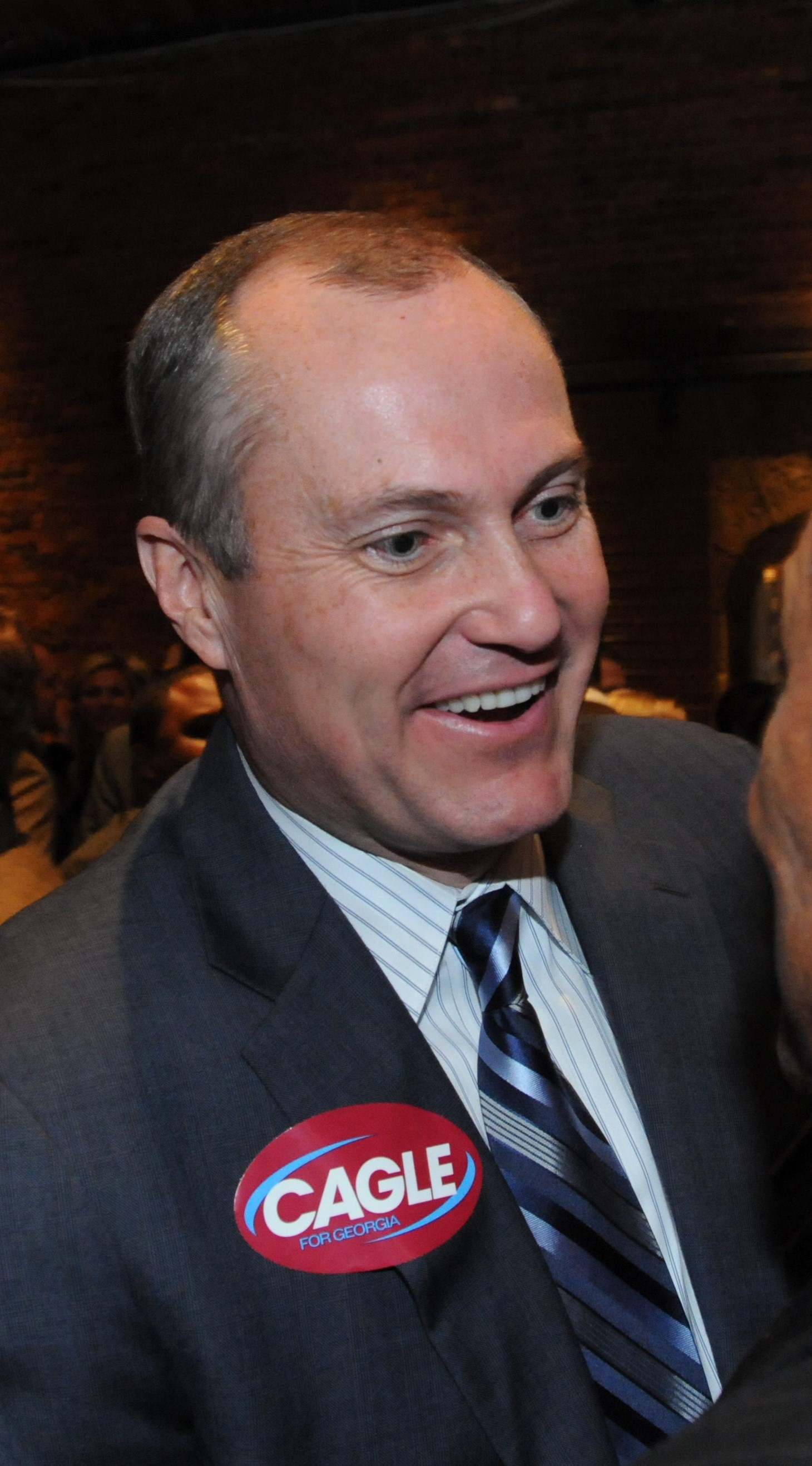
- Cagle in 2010

11th Lieutenant Governor of Georgia
- In office January 8, 2007 – January 14, 2019
- Governor: Sonny Perdue; Nathan Deal
- Preceded by: Mark Taylor
- Succeeded by: Geoff Duncan

Member of the Georgia State Senate from the 49th district
- In office January 9, 1995 – January 8, 2007
- Preceded by: Jane Hemmer
- Succeeded by: Lee Hawkins

Personal details
- Born: Lowell Stacy Cagle; January 12, 1966 (age 60) Gainesville, Georgia, U.S.
- Party: Republican
- Spouse: Nita Cagle
- Education: Gainesville State College; Georgia Southern University

Lowell Stacy "Casey" Cagle (born January 12, 1966) is an American politician who served as the 11th lieutenant governor of Georgia from 2007 to 2019.

Cagle served as a Republican Party member of the Georgia State Senate from 1995 to 2007. He assumed the position of Lieutenant Governor of Georgia in January 2007, becoming the first Republican to hold the office. He is the second most tenured Lt. Governor behind Zell Miller. Cagle was a candidate in the Republican primary in the 2018 election for Governor of Georgia.

== Early life ==
Cagle was born Lowell Stacy Cagle in Gainesville, Georgia, and raised by his single mother. He is a seventh generation resident of Hall County, Georgia. According to his legislative biography, he "attended eight different elementary schools by age six, but persevered to graduate from Hall County's public schools." After graduating from Johnson High School, Cagle attended Georgia Southern University to play football for well-known coach Erk Russell. After an injury ended his dreams of playing college football, Cagle returned home at age 20, and opened a small business.

== Business career ==
After returning to Gainesville in 1986, Cagle started what would turn into a growing tuxedo rental company. He expanded the retail business into multiple locations throughout Northeast Georgia. He founded Southern Heritage Bank in 1999 and served as its chairman until it merged into Gainesville Bank & Trust in 2004, and later SunTrust Banks in 2008. Cagle joined the board of directors of GB&T in 2005.

== Georgia State Senate (1995–2006) ==
In 1994, at age 28, Cagle ran for the Georgia Senate in Senate District 49 that included Hall County and parts of Dawson County and Forsyth County. He upset the Democratic incumbent, Jane Hemmer, and became the youngest member of the State Senate. He was re-elected five times and served from 1995 to 2006. During this time, Cagle served as Chairman of the State Senate Finance Committee, Vice Chairman of Science and Technology Committee, and as a member of the Natural Resources and the Environment Committee and the influential Appropriations Committee.

== Lieutenant governor (2007–2019) ==
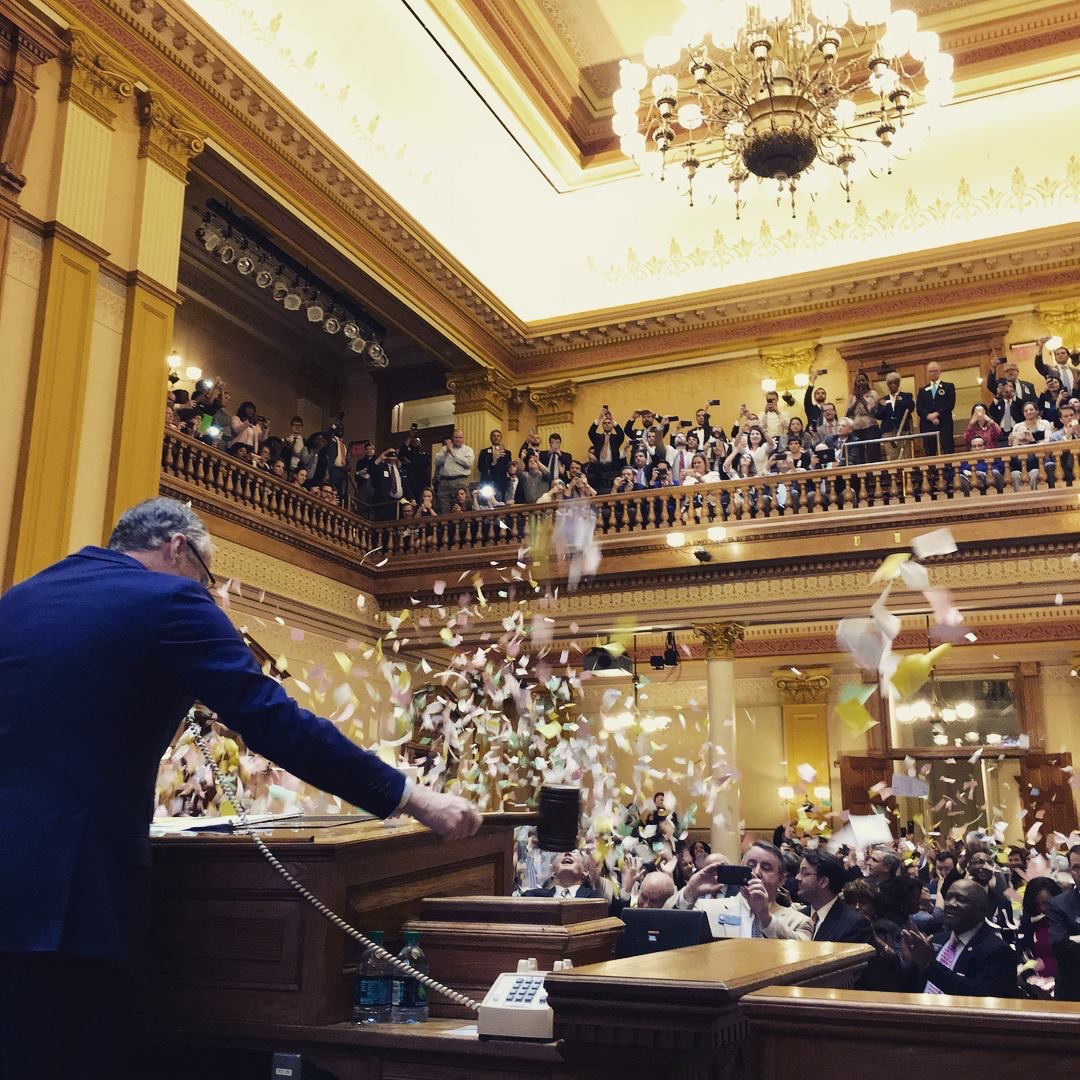
Cagle on Sine Die in 2016

=== 2006 campaign ===
In early 2005, Cagle declared his candidacy for lieutenant governor of Georgia. He was opposed in the Republican primary by nationally known Christian conservative activist Ralph Reed. Initially considered as unlikely to win, Cagle emerged as a competitive challenger to Reed. Reed accused Cagle of negative campaigning, blaming Cagle for unfavorable media attention arising from the federal investigation into the Jack Abramoff Indian lobbying scandal. On July 18, 2006, Cagle defeated Reed in the Republican Party primary with Cagle taking 56% of the vote to Reed's 44%. He then went on to successfully face former state representative Jim Martin in the general election and won with 54.1% to Martin's 42.3%, becoming Georgia's first Republican Lt. Governor.

=== 2010 campaign ===
Cagle initially ran for the governor's seat but on April 15, 2009, withdrew from the governor's race, citing a degenerative spinal condition and unspecified nerve and bone problems that required surgical treatment. He ran for and won re-election as lieutenant governor instead.

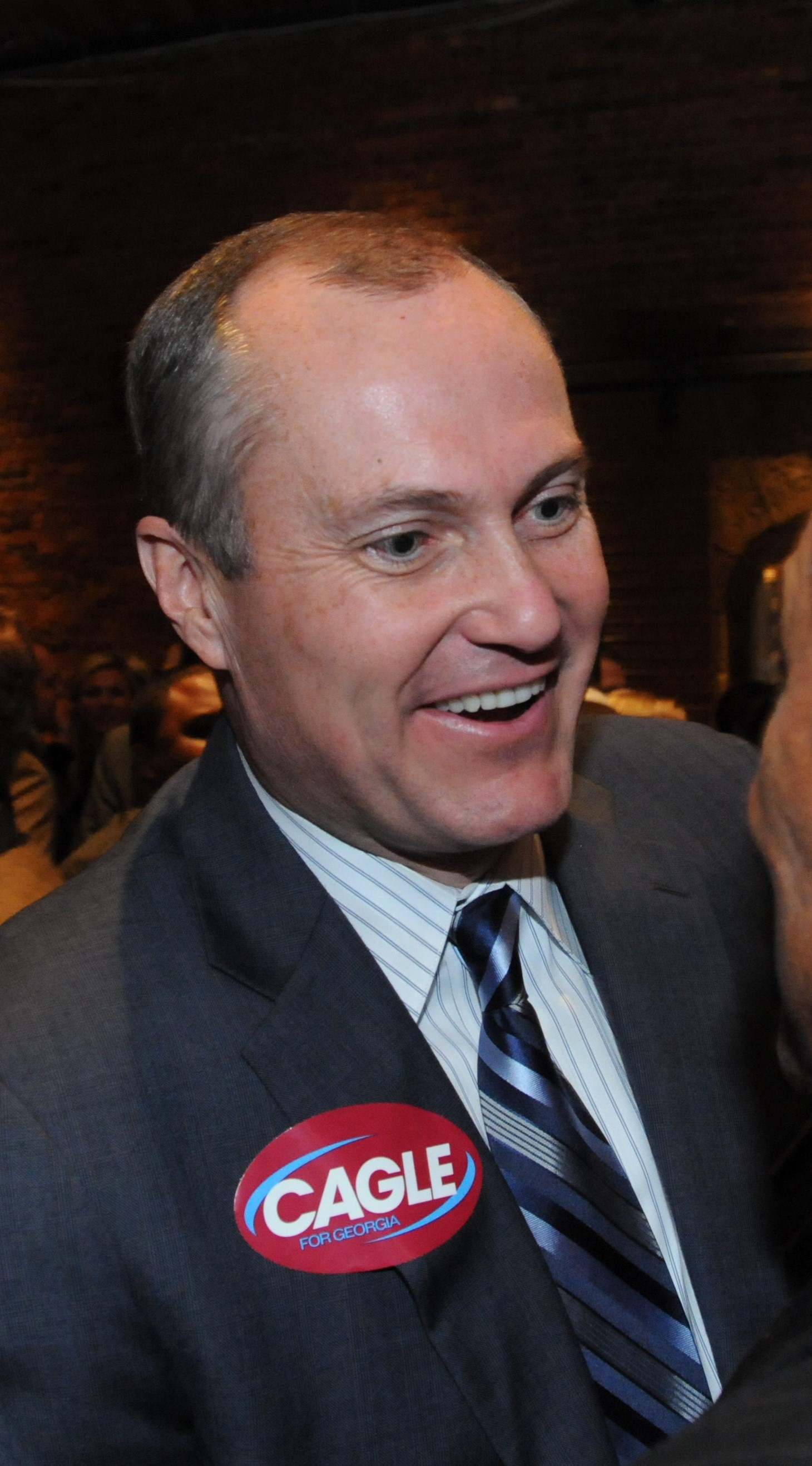
Cagle at the annual Wild Hog Supper in January 2010

=== 2014 campaign ===
Georgia's lieutenant governor office does not have the same two-term limit as the governorship, so Cagle ran for and won a third term as lieutenant governor in 2014. Cagle ran unopposed in the Republican primary and defeated his former State Senate colleague, DeKalb County Commissioner Connie Stokes in the general election. Cagle won re-election with 58% of the vote.

=== Tax cut legislation ===
During Cagle's service as lieutenant governor, the Republican majority, in order to avoid a possible windfall derived from the federal Tax Cuts and Jobs Act, approved, under the five-year plan, a reduction of the top income tax rate for individuals and businesses (from 6 percent to 5.75 percent in 2019 and down to 5.50 percent in 2020) and the doubling of the standard deduction for both individual and joint filers. This was the largest income tax rate cut in state history.

== 2018 campaign for governor ==
On April 30, 2017, Cagle formally announced his candidacy for governor in 2018. Cagle out-fund-raised his opponents by a large margin, attracting nearly $7 million in campaign contributions.

Cagle was endorsed by the National Rifle Association (NRA), Marietta Daily Journal, Cherokee Tribune, Rome News-Tribune, Waycross Journal Herald, Educators First, and he has earned the support of the Georgia Realtors. He has also been endorsed by over 100 police Sheriffs across the state. Cagle and Georgia Secretary of State Brian Kemp advanced to a runoff on July 24 since neither received 50% of the vote in the May 22 primary. By July 2018, Cagle had raised more than twice as much as Kemp. In the primary, Cagle was endorsed by incumbent Governor Nathan Deal, with Deal saying he thought "very highly" of both candidates, but that he favored Cagle. The endorsement was described a significant factor in the primary as Deal is widely viewed as the widely recognized Republican in Georgia.

During the campaign, Cagle sought to appeal to the far-right edge of the Republican Party, portrayed himself as strongly supportive of President Donald Trump, and adopted similar imagery and rhetoric to Trump. Cagle attacked the media as being "fake news". Cagle sought to portray his primary opponent Kemp as ineffective in his role as secretary of state, whereas Kemp sought to portray Cagle as scandal-prone and corrupt. On July 18, Trump tweeted his support for Kemp, saying, "I give him my full and total endorsement." Many observers believe the unexpected endorsement was the lynchpin for Kemp's late surge. It was later confirmed by the President that he endorsed at the behest of the former Georgia governor, his Agriculture Secretary, Sonny Perdue, in retaliation to Governor Nathan Deal's endorsement of Cagle, and a decade-old disagreement with Cagle on a tax cut proposal then-Governor Perdue opposed.

Despite placing first in the May primary with 39%, Cagle lost the runoff to Kemp, 69%–30%, on July 24, 2018.

== Controversy ==
=== Delta Air Lines & National Rifle Association tax controversy ===
On February 26, 2018, while lieutenant governor, Cagle threatened to block legislation that benefited Delta Air Lines after the company ended its discount for National Rifle Association members in the wake of the Stoneman Douglas High School shooting, which led to the death of seventeen students in Parkland, Florida. Cagle tweeted, "I will kill any tax legislation that benefits @Delta unless the company changes its position and fully reinstates its relationship with @NRA. Corporations cannot attack conservatives and expect us not to fight back." Shortly afterward, Cagle and the Georgia General Assembly revoked a jet fuel tax break from the 2018 Tax Reform Bill that would have benefitted Delta and other airliners. Constitutional law professors Michael J. Gerhardt of the University of North Carolina, Kathleen Burch of Atlanta's John Marshall Law School, and Gregory P. Magarian of Washington University in St. Louis all argued that Cagle's response to Delta Air Lines' decision violated the company's right to free speech under the First Amendment. After Cagle's stance, the NRA publicly endorsed his campaign for governor.

=== Apartment purchase from lobbyist ===
A New York Times investigation in June 2018 found that Cagle had purchased a one-bedroom apartment in 2008 from natural gas lobbyist Terry E. Hobbs at a discounted price. He bought the apartment for $97,000, which was 24% lower than its appraised value of $127,800, before later selling it in 2017 at a 29 percent profit. When comparing Cagle's purchase with other purchases at the same building, the Times found that "Mr. Cagle paid less per square foot than other buyers — $95.57 versus an average of $139.60 for the four other qualified sales between 2007 and 2009", which suggests it was purchased even further below market value. Furthermore, Cagle's purchase was labeled by the board as "unqualified" for appraisal purposes. This designation is given when "factors other than market value" sway pricing. In contrast to the low purchase price, Cagle valued the same property in his 2009 and 2013 disclosures at $175,000, which was significantly higher than the board's appraisal price.

=== Tippins secret tape recording ===
In June 2018, a secret recording of a conversation was released by Clay Tippins, who finished fourth in the 2018 Georgia Republican Gubernatorial Primary, where Cagle described how he supported "bad public policy" in an attempt to undermine Hunter Hill's run for governor. Cagle explained how he changed his position on Georgia House Bill 217 in order to prevent Hill from receiving financial support from a Super PAC. House Bill 217, which was sponsored by school choice activists, increased the cap on tax credits for private school scholarships from $65 million to $100 million, something that Cagle personally considered bad "a thousand different ways". Cagle admitted he backed the bill "'because this is not about policy, this is about politics.'" His campaign felt that, if Hill received the donation from the school-choice group, he would pose a significant threat to Cagle's gubernatorial ambitions. The chairman of the Super-PAC in question, the Walton Education Coalition, said that the rumors regarding the potential donation to Hill were "unfounded". Asked if he had any regrets, Cagle said his only regret was trusting Tippins.

Two Georgia state legislators, Bill Heath (R-31) and Susan Holmes (R-129) have authored a letter urging local and federal prosecutors to open an investigation into "compelling evidence of a direct quid pro quo offered by Cagle to trade legislative action for campaign funding".

=== Second secret recording ===
A 50-second excerpt from the Tippins recording was released by Brian Kemp's campaign in the weeks leading up to the gubernatorial runoff where Cagle discloses his thoughts about the Republican Primary. After discussing policy issues with Tippins, his former political opponent, Cagle states that "the problem is in a primary — and you and I are just talking off-the-record frank — they don't give a shit about those things. OK. In the general election, they care about it. OK. But they don't care about it in a primary. This primary felt like it was who had the biggest gun, who had the biggest truck, and who could be the craziest." His political adversaries were quick to label Cagle a corrupt, calculating politician following the leak of the conversation, and accused him of patronizing his Republican constituents. In an official statement to the press, however, his campaign maintained that the comments were specifically directed at Kemp, who had released two contentious ads during the primary. Cagle later stated that the recording was never meant to be made public.

=== Third secret recording ===
Another secret recording of Cagle showed him talking to Clay Tippins about Tippins' campaign debts. Tippins claims that Cagle was offering to use his campaign donors to pay Clay Tippins' campaign debt in return for his official endorsement in the gubernatorial runoff. After mentioning the $300,000 debt he had incurred during his campaign in a private meeting, Cagle replied "the way you get your debts retired is, who has the resources to call up enough people...What I do know is that we've got a lot of people who are solidly behind us. And you know, they want to help- they want to help the cause." Cagle dismissed the accusations, calling his former opponent a political has-been.

=== Travel expenditures ===
An investigation by The Atlanta Journal-Constitution found that Cagle had spent approximately $265,000 of taxpayer funds on air travel from January 2010 to June 2018 (approximately $33,125/year). Some of the taxpayer-funded flights were to cities where he raised money for his gubernatorial campaign. When using air travel for state business, Cagle on more than 100 occasions added extra legs to trips by picking him up or dropping him off in Gainesville, where he lives. The Atlanta Journal-Constitution noted that Cagle had previously sought to portray himself as a fiscal conservative.

== Personal life ==
Cagle is married to his high school sweetheart Nita, and they are the parents of three sons and grandparents of eight. The Cagles live in Chestnut Mountain, Georgia, where they are members of Christ Place Church.

== Electoral history ==
State Senator Primary Election Results

Year	Election	Republican	Votes	Pct	Republican	Votes	Pct
1996	Primary	Casey Cagle	10,294	100%	(no candidate)	0	0%
1998	Primary	Casey Cagle	9,904	100%	(no candidate)	0	0%
2000	Primary	Casey Cagle	15,791	80%	Julian Bowen	3,937	20%
2002	Primary	Casey Cagle	15,160	100%	(no candidate)	0	0%
2004	Primary	Casey Cagle	14,874	100%	(no candidate)	0	0%

State Senator General Election Results

Year	Election	Republican	Votes	Pct	Democrat	Votes	Pct
1996	General	Casey Cagle	34,093	100%	(no candidate)	0	0%
1998	General	Casey Cagle	22,951	67%	Andy Maddox	11,240	33%
2000	General	Casey Cagle	34,424	67%	Bob Vass	16,971	33%
2002	General	Casey Cagle	32,645	80%	Susie Simmons	8,135	20%
2004	General	Casey Cagle	45,282	100%	(no candidate)	0	0%

Lieutenant Governor Primary Election Results

Year	Election	Republican	Votes	Pct	Republican	Votes	Pct
2006	Primary	Casey Cagle	227,968	56%	Ralph Reed	178,790	44%
2010	Primary	Casey Cagle	525,287	100%	(no candidate)	0	0%

Lieutenant Governor General Election Results

Year	Election	Republican	Votes	Pct	Democrat	Votes	Pct	Libertarian	Votes	Pct
2006	General	Casey Cagle	1,134,517	54.1%	Jim Martin	887,506	42.3%	Allen Buckley	75,673	3.6%
2010	General	Casey Cagle	1,403,977	54.7%	Carol Porter	1,074,624	41.9%	Dan Barber	88,746	3.5%

Party political offices
Preceded by Steve Stancil	Republican nominee for Lieutenant Governor of Georgia; 2006, 2010, 2014	Succeeded by Geoff Duncan
Georgia State Senate
Preceded by Jane Hemmer	Member of the Georgia Senate from the 49th district 1995–2007	Succeeded by Lee Hawkins
Political offices
Preceded by Mark Taylor	Lieutenant Governor of Georgia; 2007–2019	Succeeded by Geoff Duncan
