= Georgia's 49th Senate district =

State district in Georgia, USA

Georgia's 49th State Senate district
Senator
Drew Echols; R–Gainesville
- Demographics: 62.7% White; 7.6% Black; 26.4% Hispanic; 1.8% Asian
- Population (2020): 183,729

District 49 of the Georgia Senate elects one member of the Georgia State Senate. It contains a majority of Hall County.

== State senators ==
- Howard Overby (until 1981)
- Nathan Deal (1981–1993)
- Jane Hemmer (1993–1995)
- Casey Cagle (1995–2007)
- Lee Hawkins (2007–2010)
- Butch Miller (2010–2023)
- Shelly Echols (2023–2025)
- Drew Echols (since 2025)
