= Gun laws in Georgia (U.S. state) =

Location of Georgia in the United States

Gun laws in Georgia regulate the sale, possession, and use of firearms and ammunition in the state of Georgia in the United States.

== Summary table ==
Subject / law	Long guns	Handguns	Relevant statutes	Notes
State permit required to purchase?	No	No		
Firearm registration?	No	No		
Assault weapon law?	No	No		
Magazine capacity restriction?	No	No		
Owner license required?	No	No		
Permit required for concealed carry?	N/A	No	O.C.G.A. § 16-11-126; O.C.G.A. § 16-11-129	Georgia is a "shall issue" for Georgia residents 21 years or older. Permitless concealed carry took effect on April 12, 2022.
Permit required for open carry?	No	No	O.C.G.A. § 16-11-126; O.C.G.A. § 16-11-129	Georgia is a "shall issue" for Georgia residents 21 years or older. Permitless open carry took effect on April 12, 2022.
Castle Doctrine/Stand Your Ground law?	Yes	Yes	O.C.G.A. § 16-3-23.1	
State preemption of local restrictions?	Yes	Yes	O.C.G.A. § 16-11-173	
NFA weapons restricted?	No	No	O.C.G.A. §§ 16-11-120 to 16-11-125	
Peaceable Journey laws?	No	No		
Background checks required for private sales?	No	No		

== State constitutional provisions ==
The Georgia Constitution guarantees the right to keep and bear arms. Article one, section one, paragraph VII of the Georgia Constitution states: "The right of the People to keep and bear arms shall not be infringed, but the General Assembly shall have the power to prescribe the manner in which arms may be borne." In addition, Ga. Code Ann. § 1-2-6(a)(9) includes "the right to keep and bear arms" within a general list of citizens’ rights.

== Overview ==
On June 8, 2010, Senate Bill 308 was signed by Governor Sonny Perdue reforming and clarifying many of Georgia's Gun Laws, while leaving certain restrictions in place.

Georgia is a "shall issue" state for both open and concealed carry, with the Georgia Weapon's Carry License application to be submitted through the probate court of the county of residence. Applicants must be at least 21 years of age, unless they provide proof of basic training and service in the military. On April 12, 2022, Governor Brian Kemp signed the Constitutional Carry bill SB 319 into law allowing for both open and concealed carry without a permit, for both residents and non-residents 21 years of age or older, of handguns, long guns, and other weapons including knives and various others.

State preemption laws prohibit localities from regulating the ownership, transportation, carrying, and possession of firearms and knives. Georgia also has a law preventing localities from enacting ordinances or lawsuits to classify gun ranges as nuisances. This means that local parks, offices, etc. of non-Federal government agencies may not prohibit those with a valid Georgia Weapons License from carrying. Federal regulations continue to prohibit carrying weapons on Corps of Engineers and US Postal Service property.

Firearm regulations are uniform throughout the state, and a firearms permit is valid throughout the state, in all areas other than in a few specially defined areas. These specially defined prohibited areas include:

- In a government building, where ingress into such building is restricted or screened by security personnel and overseen by a POST certified, sworn peace officer
- In a courthouse
- In a jail or prison
- In a place of worship, unless the governing body or authority of the place of worship permits the carrying of weapons or long guns by license holders
- In a state mental health facility
- On the premises of a nuclear power facility
- Within 150 feet (46 m) of any polling place, only during an election.
- On school grounds (incl. building and grounds), unless carrying or picking up a student, or permitted in writing by an official of the school, however weapons may be securely stored in vehicles parked on school grounds.

As exceptions to the above list, a person may keep their firearm in a locked compartment of their vehicle at any of the above places except nuclear power facilities. Also, a person may approach security or management of any of the above places (except schools and nuclear power facilities) and ask them for directions on removing, securing, storing, or temporarily surrendering the weapon.

As of July 1, 2006, Georgia became a "Stand Your Ground" state, and requires no duty to retreat before using deadly force in self-defense, or defense of others.

Georgia law allows private firearm sales between residents without requiring any processing through an FFL.

A Kennesaw, Georgia city ordinance requires that all homeowners own a firearm and ammunition (Sec 34-1a). No one has ever been charged with violating this ordinance. An amendment exempts those who conscientiously object to owning a firearm, convicted felons, those who cannot afford a firearm, and those with a mental or physical disability that would prevent them from owning a firearm.

On April 23, 2014, Georgia's gun laws were again revised when Governor Nathan Deal signed House Bill 60, the Safe Carry Protection Act. The Safe Carry Protection Act changed many of the currently enacted gun laws in place beforehand.

In 2017, the Georgia legislature passed HB 280, which allows for concealed carry permit holders to carry concealed handguns on public college campuses. Governor Nathan Deal signed it into law on May 4, 2017. The law took effect July 1, 2017 on all University System of Georgia and Technical College System of Georgia Campuses, including universities, colleges, and technical colleges under USG or TCSG. Under HB280 any Georgia Weapons Licensee may carry on University System of Georgia or Technical College System of Georgia property if they are carrying concealed. They may not carry in any dormitory or Greek house owned by the University System, in any athletic venue used for intercollegiate sports, in any daycare facility on campus with limited entry (gated), in any classroom with a currently enrolled high school student, in any private office space, or in any room currently in use for disciplinary proceedings. HB280 does not remove the prohibition against carry on private university and college property under Georgia Law.

Some counties have adopted Second Amendment sanctuary resolutions.

Code Section 16-11-130(a)(3) exempts Active duty Military from laws concerning carry of weapons and prohibited carry locations (Code Sections 16-11-126 through 16–11–127.2) just as it does for law enforcement officers. Law enforcement offices are exempt in the same code (Code Section 16-11-130(a)(1)).

== See also ==
- Law of Georgia (U.S. state)
- Safe Carry Protection Act
