= Americans for Immigration Control =

American activist group

Americans for Immigration Control is an American activist group that opposes illegal immigration to the United States. Based in Monterey, Virginia, it advocates for increasing funding to the United States Border Patrol, introducing punishments for employers that hire undocumented immigrants, and reforms to reduce legal immigration to the United States. It also opposes amnesty and birthright citizenship for undocumented immigrants in the United States.

== Background ==
Founded in 1983, the group claims to have over 250,000 members. It promotes the "reconquista" conspiracy theory that Chicano and Mexican immigrants to the United States intend to take control of the Southwestern United States. It is a sister group of the American Immigration Control Foundation, both of which are listed as hate groups by the Southern Poverty Law Center. As of 2007, its president was Robert Goldsborough.
