= Shelly Echols =

American politician (born 1979)

Member of the Georgia State Senate from the 49th district
- In office January 9, 2023 – January 13, 2025
- Preceded by: Butch Miller
- Succeeded by: Drew Echols

Personal details
- Born: Shelly Danielle Cantrell; October 9, 1979 (age 46) Gainesville, Georgia, U.S.
- Party: Republican
- Spouse: Drew Echols (m. 1999)
- Children: 2
- Education: University of North Georgia (BA)

Shelly Danielle Cantrell Echols (born October 9, 1979) is an American politician. She was a member of the Georgia State Senate from the 49th district, serving from 2023 to 2025. She is a member of the Republican Party. Prior to being elected to the Georgia State Senate, she served one term on the Hall County Board of Commissioners as a District 3 Commissioner.

She was succeeded as state senator by her husband Drew Echols. They were married in 1999.
