= Marc Morris (politician) =

American politician

William Marc Morris is an American politician who was member of the Georgia House of Representatives and a member of the Republican Party representing GA House District 26.

== Military service ==
Morris joined the U.S. Navy following his junior year of high school. After training at the Great Lakes Naval Training Center in 1981, he was accepted into the Religious Program Specialist Rating. While in the Navy, Morris was recognized for his contributions to the modernization of IT capabilities for two Flag Officers.

== Career ==
Morris is the founder and president of The Talmadge Group, an information technology firm.

In 2017, Morris announced his intention to fill the House seat of Geoff Duncan, who had left the seat to pursue his successful campaign for lieutenant governor. Morris won the 2017 special election to complete the remainder of Duncan's term in a field with three competitors. Morris was re-elected in 2018. He has since announced that he does not intend to seek a third term in office in 2020.
