= Drew Echols =

American politician

Member of the Georgia State Senate from the 49th district
- Incumbent
- Assumed office January 13, 2025
- Succeeded by: Shelly Echols

Personal details
- Born: Jared Drew Echols
- Party: Republican
- Spouse: Shelly Cantrell (m. 1999)
- Children: 2
- Occupation: Farmer; politician
- Website: www.votedrewechols.com

Jared Drew Echols is an American politician who was elected member of the Georgia State Senate for the 49th district in 2024.

He succeeded his wife Shelly Echols as state senator. They were married in 1999.
