= Geoff Duncan =

American politician (born 1975)

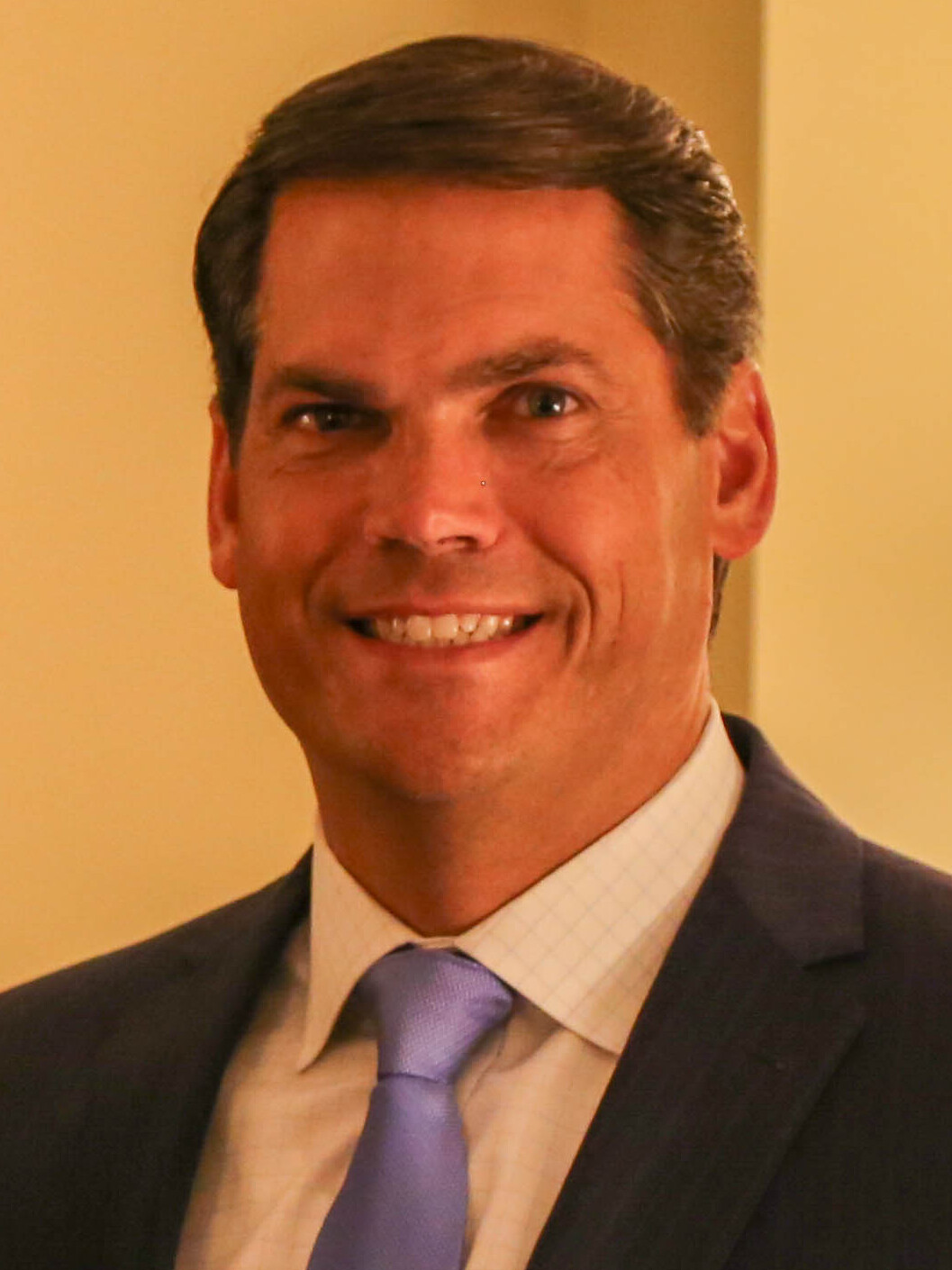
- Duncan in 2019

12th Lieutenant Governor of Georgia
- In office January 14, 2019 – January 9, 2023
- Governor: Brian Kemp
- Preceded by: Casey Cagle
- Succeeded by: Burt Jones

Member of the Georgia House of Representatives from the 26th district
- In office January 14, 2013 – August 28, 2017
- Preceded by: Carl Rogers
- Succeeded by: Marc Morris

Personal details
- Born: April 1, 1975 (age 51) Atlanta, Georgia, U.S.
- Party: Republican (before 2025); Democratic (2025–present)
- Spouse: Brooke Mize (m. 1997)
- Children: 3
- Education: Georgia Institute of Technology (BS)
- Website: Campaign website

Geoffrey L. Duncan (born April 1, 1975) is an American politician, businessman, and public speaker. Elected as a Republican, he served as the 12th lieutenant governor of Georgia from 2019 to 2023, and was a member of the Georgia House of Representatives from 2013 to 2017. He joined the Democratic Party in 2025.

After playing college baseball for the Georgia Tech Yellow Jackets, Duncan played professional baseball for six years, until a shoulder injury ended his baseball career. He went into business and was elected to the Georgia House in 2012. Duncan was elected lieutenant governor in 2018, but he did not seek re-election in 2022, with fellow Republican Burt Jones elected to replace him.

In the wake of the 2020 presidential election, Duncan was among the few Republican Party officials who openly and outspokenly criticized Donald Trump for falsely claiming the election was stolen. After leaving office, Duncan became a political commentator for CNN. In January 2025, the Georgia Republican Party's executive committee passed a resolution to expel Duncan from the state party and ban him from running as a Republican, a largely ceremonial statement as Georgia does not have partisan registration nor do political parties have the power to unilaterally strip partisan affiliation from somebody. He joined the Democratic Party later that year and announced his candidacy for the 2026 Georgia gubernatorial election. He placed fourth in the Democratic primary.

== Early career ==
=== Baseball ===
Duncan attended Chattahoochee High School in Johns Creek, Georgia, and the Georgia Institute of Technology, where he played college baseball for the Yellow Jackets as a pitcher. He played in the 1994 College World Series with Georgia Tech, losing in the final round. In 1995, he played collegiate summer baseball with the Yarmouth–Dennis Red Sox of the Cape Cod Baseball League.

The Florida Marlins selected Duncan in the 69th round, with the 1,647th overall selection, of the 1996 Major League Baseball draft. Duncan played in Minor League Baseball for the Marlins organization from 1996 through 2000. He reached as high as Triple-A, where he was being used as a relief pitcher, when a shoulder injury ended his career. Duncan then retired from baseball and went into business.

=== Business ===
Duncan was president of Striking Designs Inc. from 2006 to 2015. In 2015, he became chief executive officer for Wellview Health, a Nashville-based health care navigation company.

== Georgia House of Representatives ==
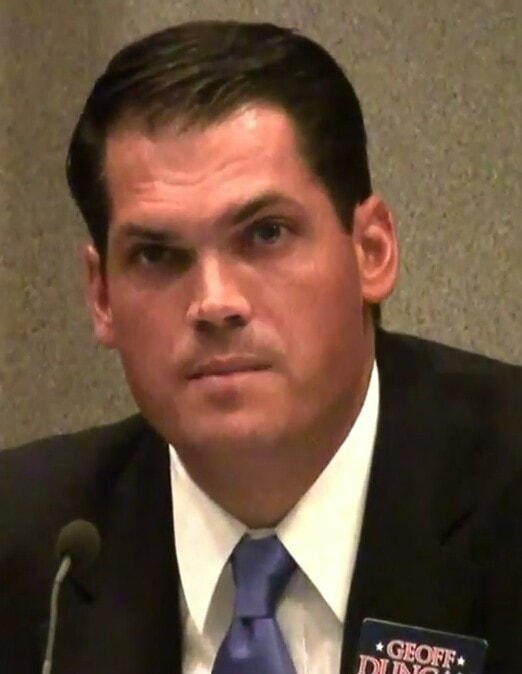
Duncan as a candidate for the Georgia House of Representatives in 2012

Duncan successfully ran to represent the newly created 26th district of the Georgia House of Representatives in the 2012 election. In the Republican primary, he narrowly defeated former legislator Tom Knox, who held the seat before running for State Insurance Commissioner in 2010.

Following a recount, Duncan was found to have won 4,507 votes to 4,452 received by Knox. Duncan's campaign emphasized creating private sector jobs, reducing government spending, and supporting conservation efforts at Lake Lanier.

In 2014, Duncan ran for reelection, defeating Knox in a rematch with 61% of the vote. He faced no opposition from Democrats in the general election. Duncan was once again reelected in the 2016 election. As a state legislator, he helped lead efforts to pass Michael’s Law, a bill that forbids individuals under the age of 21 from working as bouncers at a bar.

== Lieutenant Governor of Georgia ==
=== 2018 election ===
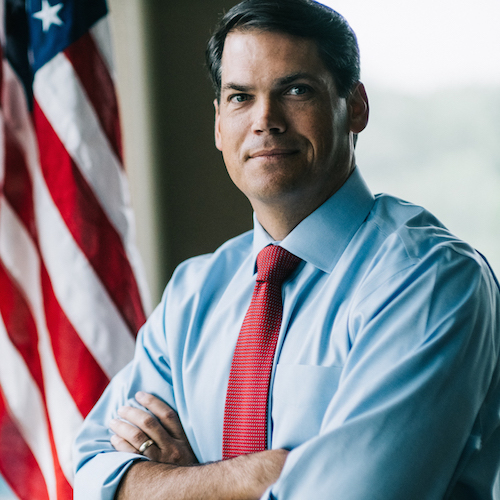
Duncan as a candidate for Lieutenant Governor of Georgia in 2018.

Duncan announced he would run for lieutenant governor of Georgia on April 10, 2017. He resigned from the Georgia House in September 2017 to focus on running for lieutenant governor in 2018. He was described as an "underdog" candidate against David Shafer, who had served as president pro tempore of the Georgia State Senate.

On May 22, 2018, Shafer received 48.9% of the vote in the Republican primary with Duncan coming in second place with 26.6%. Because no candidate received a majority of votes, the election then went to a runoff held on July 24. Duncan acknowledged that he faced an uphill battle against Shafer in the runoff election. The runoff election focused largely on Shafer's record at the capitol and a number of ethical questions surrounding his candidacy.

On July 24, Duncan, previously considered a longshot candidate defeated Shafer with 50.16% of the vote. His victory was described as an upset by The Atlanta Journal-Constitution. He defeated Democratic nominee Sarah Riggs Amico in the general election, receiving nearly 52% of the vote and avoiding another runoff.

=== Tenure ===
Duncan was inaugurated lieutenant governor on January 14, 2019. As lieutenant governor, Duncan highlighted efforts by the Kemp administration on healthcare policy, and stated his wish for Georgia to become the "technology capital of the East Coast".

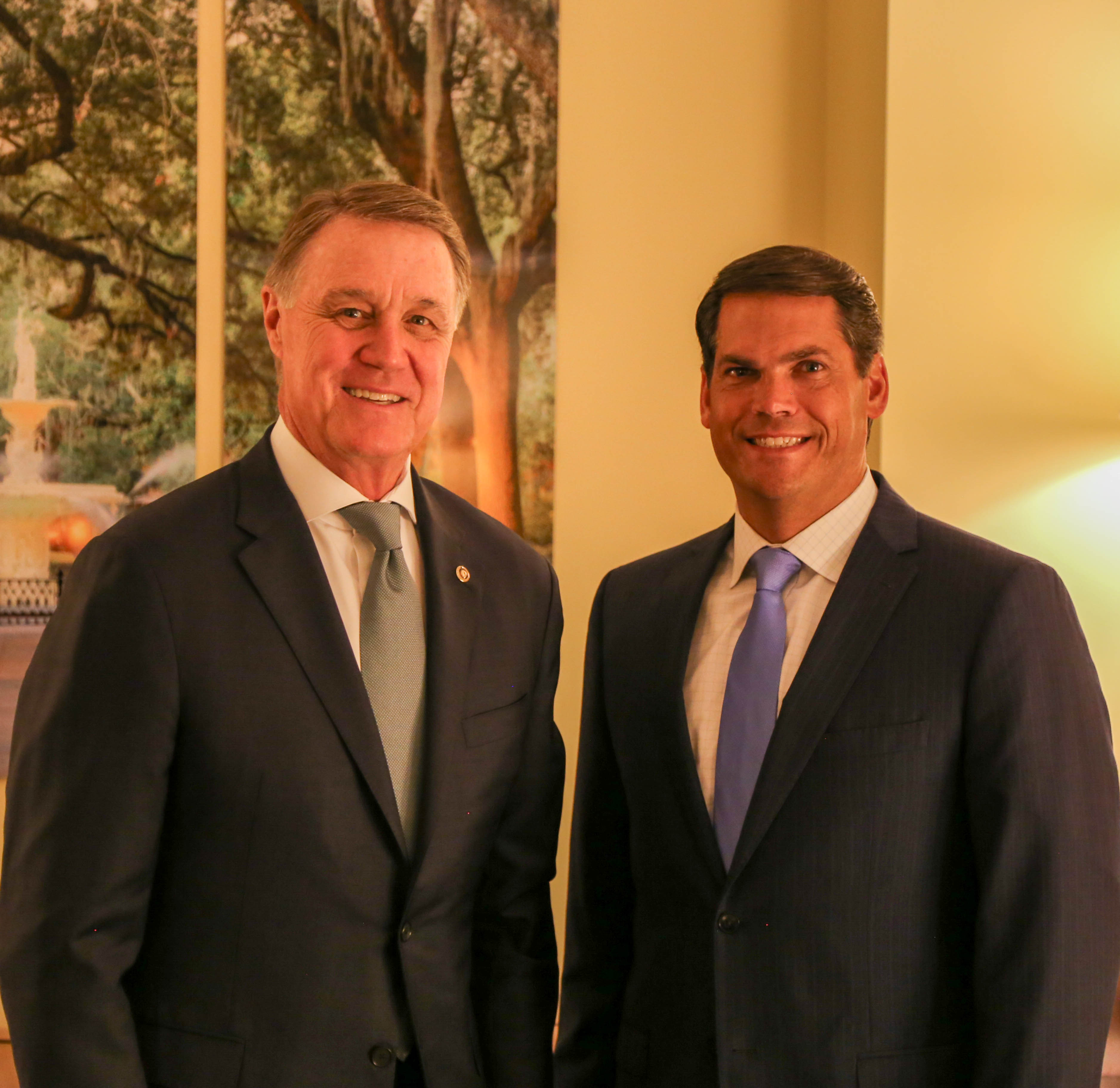
Duncan (right) with U.S. Senator David Perdue in 2019.

On December 6, 2020, Duncan and Governor Brian Kemp put out a joint statement explaining that calling a joint session of the Georgia General Assembly to appoint their own electors to send to the United States Electoral College would be unconstitutional. Following unsuccessful efforts to overturn the election of Democratic candidate Joe Biden in the 2020 presidential election, in March 2021 Georgia Republicans enacted the controversial Election Integrity Act of 2021 that imposed new restrictions on voting.

Days later, Duncan said during a CNN interview that momentum for the legislation grew from "the fallout from the ten weeks of misinformation that flew in from former President Donald Trump. I went back over the weekend to really look at where this really started to gain momentum in the legislature, and it was when Rudy Giuliani showed up in a couple of committee rooms and spent hours spreading misinformation and sowing doubt across, you know, hours of testimony."

In April 2021, Duncan's chief of staff stated that he was unlikely to run for a second term, after he openly contradicted false claims of election fraud in the 2020 presidential election. His chief of staff added that Duncan had yet to make a final decision about whether to run again in 2022. On May 17, 2021, Duncan announced that he would not be seeking a second term. An October 2021 trip to New Hampshire to promote his book GOP 2.0, which outlines plans for a post-Trump future for the Republican Party, fueled speculation in his home state that Duncan may be positioning himself to run for president in 2024. Duncan said he did not vote for either Raphael Warnock or Herschel Walker in the 2022 U.S. Senate election.

== Post-lieutenant governor career ==
In May 2024, during the lead-up to the 2024 presidential election, Duncan wrote an opinion piece titled "Why I'm Voting for Biden and other Republicans should, too", in the Atlanta Journal-Constitution. After Biden stepped aside, Duncan endorsed Kamala Harris. Duncan urged Republicans to support Harris' presidential campaign, giving a speech directed to them at the Democratic National Convention.

=== Expulsion by Georgia Republican Party ===
On January 6, 2025, the Georgia Republican Party's executive committee unanimously passed a resolution to expel Duncan from the state party because of his support for Kamala Harris in the 2024 elections. The Georgia GOP asked news media to refer to Duncan "as 'expelled Republican Geoff Duncan' or 'ousted Republican Geoff Duncan.'" Duncan responded on social media, saying "Hard to believe this is a good use of time for a party that's only got a limited amount of time to figure out mass deportations, world peace and global tariffs. Learn how to take a victory lap not light another dumpster fire."

Duncan at that time said he still considered himself a Republican and that he is trying to "save his party from Trump", according to Atlanta's WSB-TV. According to the Washington Times, Duncan would not be permitted to run for elected office as a Republican.

=== Joining the Democratic Party and gubernatorial campaign ===
On a July 1, 2025, episode of the Atlanta Journal-Constitution's "Politically Georgia" podcast, Duncan expressed his continued frustration with the President Trump-led Republican Party, and discussed rumors that he might run for Georgia governor as a Democrat.

In an editorial for the Atlanta Journal-Constitution published on August 5, 2025, Duncan announced he had joined the Democratic Party, and stated that the party switch was rooted in his desire to better "love thy neighbor" through "public policy."

He announced his gubernatorial campaign as a Democrat on September 16, 2025. He faced former Atlanta mayor Keisha Lance Bottoms, state senator Jason Esteves, former DeKalb County CEO Mike Thurmond, and state representative Derrick Jackson in the Democratic primary. Bottoms won the nomination.

== Personal life ==
Duncan and his wife, Brooke, live in Cumming, Georgia. They have three sons.

== Electoral history ==
Georgia lieutenant gubernatorial Republican primary, 2018
Party	Candidate	Votes	%
Republican	David Shafer	268,221	48.91
Republican	Geoff Duncan	146,163	26.65
Republican	Rick Jeffares	134,047	24.44

Georgia lieutenant gubernatorial Republican primary runoff, 2018
Party	Candidate	Votes	%
Republican	Geoff Duncan	280,465	50.14
Republican	David Shafer	278,868	49.86

Georgia lieutenant gubernatorial election, 2018
Party	Candidate	Votes	%
Republican	Geoff Duncan	1,951,738	51.63
Democratic	Sarah Riggs Amico	1,828,566	48.37

== Bibliography ==
- GOP 2.0 (2021)

Party political offices
Preceded by Casey Cagle	Republican nominee for Lieutenant Governor of Georgia; 2018	Succeeded by Burt Jones
Political offices
Preceded by Casey Cagle	Lieutenant Governor of Georgia; 2019–2023	Succeeded by Burt Jones
