= 2014 Georgia gubernatorial election =

- November 4, 2014
- Turnout: 42.25%
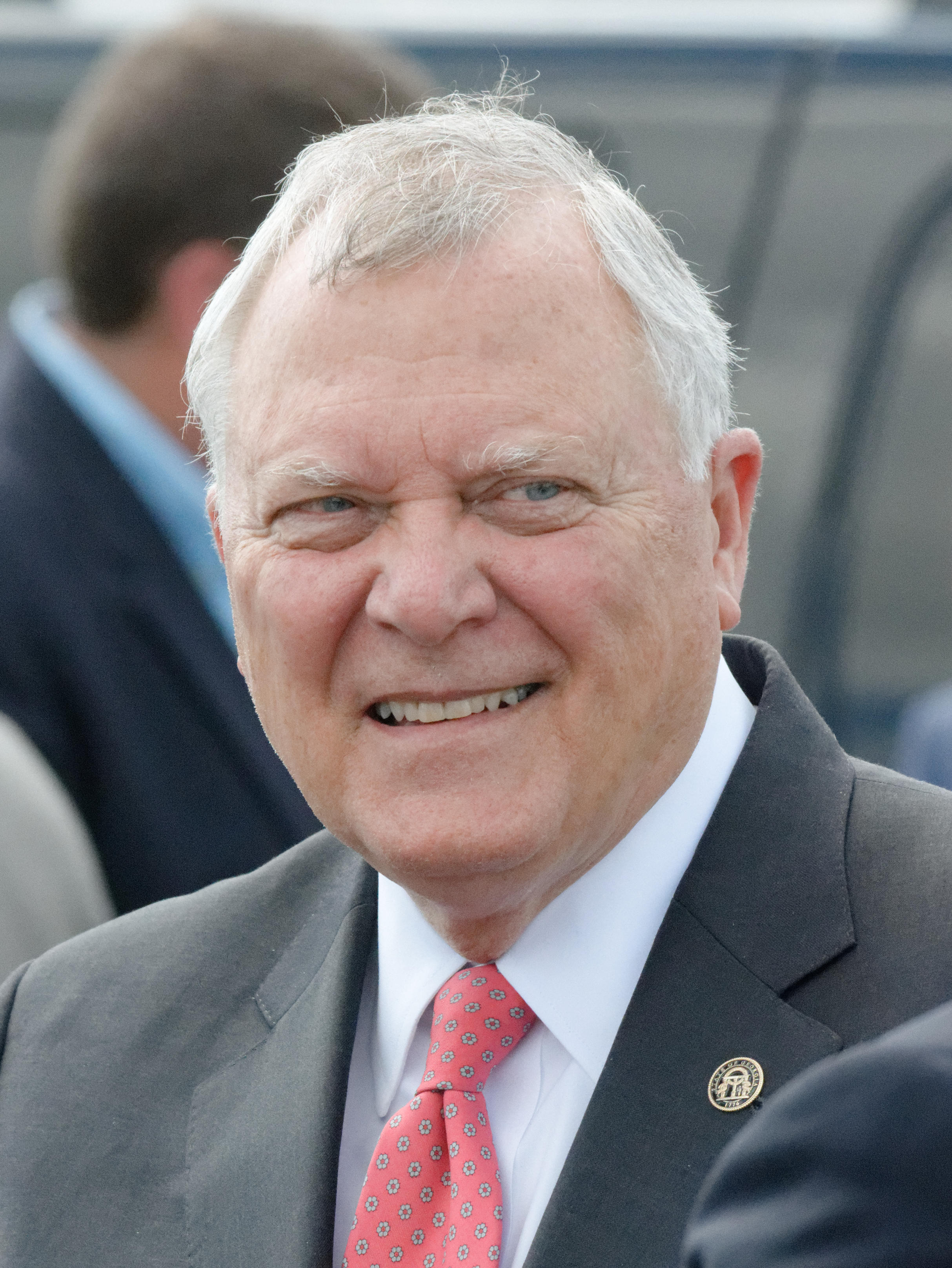

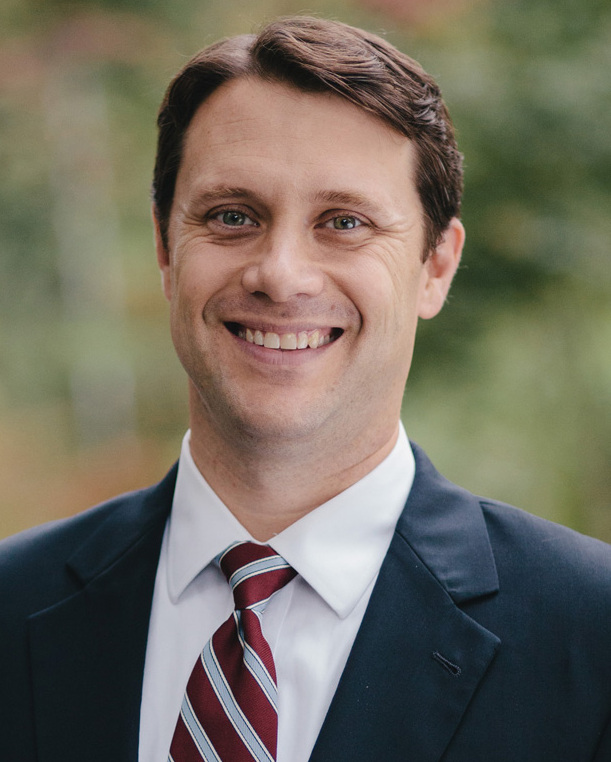
Nominee	Nathan Deal	Jason Carter
Party	Republican	Democratic
Popular vote	1,345,237	1,144,794
Percentage	52.74%	44.88%
- Deal: 40–50% 50–60% 60–70% 70–80% 80–90% >90% Carter: 40–50% 50–60% 60–70% 70–80% 80–90% >90% Hunt: 50–60% Tie: 40–50% 50% No data
Governor before election
Nathan Deal
Republican
Elected Governor
Nathan Deal
Republican

The 2014 Georgia gubernatorial election took place on November 4, 2014, to elect the governor of Georgia, concurrently with the election to Georgia's Class II U.S. Senate seat, elections to the United States Senate in other states, elections to the United States House of Representatives, and various state and local elections.

Incumbent Republican Governor Nathan Deal was elected to a second term in office by a margin of 7.8%. He defeated two primary challengers, and in the general election defeated Democratic state Senator Jason Carter and Libertarian nominee businessman and engineer Andrew Hunt, who were unopposed in their respective primaries.

Despite Carter’s loss, he flipped Douglas County, Henry County, and Newton County.

As of 2022, this is the last time that Cobb and Gwinnett counties voted for the Republican candidate for governor, and the last time that Chattahoochee, Dooly, Quitman, Twiggs, and Wilkinson counties voted for the Democratic candidate. As of 2026, this is the last time the Democratic nominee was not a black woman.

== Republican primary ==
=== Candidates ===
==== Declared ====
- John Barge, state school superintendent
- Nathan Deal, incumbent governor
- David Pennington, mayor of Dalton

=== Polling ===
Poll source	Date(s) administered	Sample size	Margin of error	Nathan Deal	John Barge	David Pennington	Undecided
InsiderAdvantage	May 18, 2014	852	±3.36%	62.1%	5.1%	9.9%	22.9%
SurveyUSA	May 8–12, 2014	634	± 4%	63%	10%	15%	12%
SurveyUSA	April 24–27, 2014	501	± 4.3%	64%	10%	11%	16%
InsiderAdvantage	April 13–15, 2014	804	±3.4%	61%	4%	7%	28%
Landmark/Rosetta	March 23–24, 2014	600	± 4%	58%	8%	7%	27%
SurveyUSA	March 16–18, 2014	508	± 4.2%	65%	7%	11%	17%
Public Policy Polling	August 2–5, 2013	260	± 6.1%	71%	8%	—	21%
Public Policy Polling	August 2–5, 2013	260	± 6.1%	71%	—	11%	19%
20/20 Insight, LLC	May 7–9, 2013	?	± ?	53%	—	18%	29%

=== Results ===
Results by county: Deal: 40–50%; 50–60%; 60–70%; 70–80%; 80–90%; Pennington: 50–60%

Republican primary results
Party	Candidate	Votes	%
Republican	Nathan Deal (incumbent)	430,170	72.15
Republican	David Pennington	99,548	16.70
Republican	John Barge	66,500	11.15
Total votes		596,218	100

== Democratic primary ==
=== Candidates ===
==== Declared ====
- Jason Carter, state senator and grandson of former U.S. president and former governor Jimmy Carter

==== Withdrew ====
- Connie Stokes, former DeKalb County commissioner, former state senator and candidate for GA-04 in 2004 and 2010 (running for lieutenant governor)

==== Declined ====
- Stacey Abrams, minority leader of the Georgia House of Representatives
- Roy Barnes, former governor and nominee for governor in 2010
- Shirley Franklin, former mayor of Atlanta
- Scott Holcomb, state representative
- Kasim Reed, mayor of Atlanta

=== Results ===
Democratic primary results
Party	Candidate	Votes	%
Democratic	Jason Carter	304,243	100
Total votes		304,243	100

== Libertarian primary ==
=== Candidates ===
==== Declared ====
- Andrew Hunt, businessman and engineer

== General election ==
=== Debates ===
- Complete video of debate, October 19, 2014 - C-SPAN
- Complete video of debate, October 26, 2014 - C-SPAN

=== Predictions ===
Source	Ranking	As of
The Cook Political Report	Tossup	November 3, 2014
Sabato's Crystal Ball	Lean R	November 3, 2014
Rothenberg Political Report	Lean R	November 3, 2014
Real Clear Politics	Tossup	November 3, 2014

=== Polling ===
Poll source	Date(s) administered	Sample size	Margin of error	Nathan Deal (R)	Jason Carter (D)	Andrew Hunt (L)	Other	Undecided
Public Policy Polling	November 1–3, 2014	975	± 3.1%	47%	43%	4%	—	6%
Public Policy Polling	November 1–3, 2014	975	± 3.1%	49%	45%	—	—	6%
Landmark Communications	November 2, 2014	1,500	± 2.5%	51%	45%	3%	—	2%
Insider Advantage	November 2, 2014	1,463	± 3%	47%	44%	5%	—	4%
SurveyUSA	October 30 – November 2, 2014	591	± 4.1%	47%	42%	5%	—	5%
YouGov	October 25–31, 2014	1,743	± 3.2%	45%	41%	1%	1%	12%
NBC News/Marist	October 26–30, 2014	603 LV	± 4%	48%	43%	3%	1%	5%
NBC News/Marist	October 26–30, 2014	875 RV	± 3.3%	46%	42%	4%	1%	7%
Landmark Communications	October 29, 2014	1,500	± 2.5%	48%	46%	4%	—	3%
Vox Populi Polling	October 28, 2014	602	± 4%	49%	42%	3%	—	7%
Monmouth	October 26–28, 2014	436	± 4.7%	48%	42%	5%	—	5%
Rasmussen Reports	October 25–27, 2014	977	± 3%	49%	43%	—	2%	6%
SurveyUSA	October 24–27, 2014	611	± 4%	46%	44%	3%	—	6%
Public Policy Polling	October 23–24, 2014	771	± ?%	48%	45%	4%	—	3%
CBS News/NYT/YouGov	October 16–23, 2014	1,774	± 4%	47%	43%	2%	0%	8%
Atlanta Journal-Constitution	October 16–23, 2014	1,170	± 3.6%	46%	41%	6%	—	7%
Insider Advantage	October 21–22, 2014	704	± 3.7%	44%	44%	5%	—	8%
CNN/ORC International	October 19–22, 2014	565	± 4%	46%	48%	6%	—	—
Landmark Communications	October 20–21, 2014	1,000	± 2.75%	48%	45%	5%	—	2%
SurveyUSA	October 17–20, 2014	606	± 4.1%	45%	43%	4%	—	8%
GaPundit.com	October 13–14, 2014	1,543	± 2.49%	44%	44%	6%	—	5%
SurveyUSA	October 10–13, 2014	563	± 4.2%	46%	46%	4%	—	4%
Landmark Communications	October 7–9, 2014	1,000	± 3.1%	45%	45%	5%	—	5%
SurveyUSA	October 2–6, 2014	566	± 4.2%	46%	44%	4%	—	7%
Public Policy Polling	October 2–5, 2014	895	± 3.3%	46%	41%	4%	—	9%
Public Policy Polling	October 2–5, 2014	895	± 3.3%	50%	45%	—	—	5%
Hickman Analytics	September 26 – October 5, 2014	500	± 4.4%	44%	36%	9%	—	13%
Rasmussen Reports	September 30 – October 1, 2014	1,000	± 4%	49%	43%	—	2%	6%
Insider Advantage	September 29 – October 1, 2014	947	± 3.2%	44%	43%	4%	—	9%
CBS News/NYT/YouGov	September 20 – October 1, 2014	1,851	± 3%	48%	43%	1%	0%	7%
SurveyUSA	September 19–22, 2014	550	± 4.3%	44%	45%	4%	—	7%
Rasmussen Reports	September 15–16, 2014	750	± 4%	45%	44%	—	3%	8%
Insider Advantage	September 10–11, 2014	1,167	± 2.9%	44%	40%	7%	—	9%
Landmark Communications	September 9–11, 2014	1,109	± 2.9%	44%	47%	4%	—	5%
Atlanta Journal-Constitution	September 8–11, 2014	884	± 4%	43%	42%	7%	—	8%
SurveyUSA	September 5–8, 2014	558	± 4.2%	45%	44%	4%	—	6%
CBS News/NYT/YouGov	August 18 – September 2, 2014	1,900	± 3%	47%	39%	4%	1%	9%
GaPundit.com	August 24–25, 2014	1,578	± 2.47%	44%	42%	7%	—	8%
Landmark Communications	August 20–21, 2014	600	± 4%	40%	44%	—	—	16%
SurveyUSA	August 14–17, 2014	560	± 4.2%	48%	39%	4%	—	8%
InsiderAdvantage	August 12–13, 2014	719	± 3.7%	43%	39%	7%	—	11%
Hicks Evaluation Group	August 8–10, 2014	788	± 3.48%	45%	45%	—	—	9%
Landmark Communications	July 25, 2014	750	± 3.8%	40%	47%	5%	—	9%
Rasmussen Reports	July 23–24, 2014	750	± 4%	44%	45%	—	3%	8%
CBS News/NYT/YouGov	July 5–24, 2014	2,568	± 3.4%	50%	41%	—	1%	8%
Landmark Communications	July 15, 2014	750	± 4	41%	49%	4%	—	6%
Public Policy Polling	July 11–13, 2014	664	± ?	41%	40%	8%	—	11%
Insider Advantage	June 24–25, 2014	1,349	± 2.7%	47%	40%	—	3%	10%
SurveyUSA	June 3–5, 2014	999	± 3.2%	44%	38%	7%	—	11%
Rasmussen Reports	May 21–22, 2014	750	± 4%	41%	48%	—	3%	7%
Public Policy Polling	May 21–22, 2014	803	± ?%	43%	43%	7%	—	7%
SurveyUSA	May 8–12, 2014	1,380	± 2.7%	43%	37%	7%	—	14%
Atlanta Journal-Constitution	May 5–8, 2014	1,012	± 4%	48%	44%	—	—	8%
Saint Leo	May 5–6, 2014	1,000	± 3%	38%	35%	11%	—	16%
NBC News/Marist	April 30 – May 5, 2014	2,196	± 2.1%	50%	40%	—	1%	10%
SurveyUSA	April 24–27, 2014	1,567	± 2.5%	41%	37%	9%	—	13%
Public Policy Polling	April 1–3, 2014	628	± 4%	42%	43%	—	—	15%
Landmark/Rosetta Stone	March 30, 2014	575	± 4%	43%	39%	—	—	18%
Insider Advantage	March 13, 2014	486	± 4.3%	38%	41%	—	—	21%
Public Policy Polling	February 19–20, 2014	833	± 4%	45%	42%	—	—	12%
Atlanta Journal-Constitution	January 6–9, 2014	802	± 4%	47%	38%	—	—	15%
Insider Advantage	January 6, 2014	529	± 4.6%	44%	22%	—	—	34%
Anzalone Liszt Grove	October 14–20, 2013	600	± 4%	44%	36%	—	—	20%
Public Policy Polling	October 7–8, 2013	602	± 4.1%	44%	40%	—	—	16%
Public Policy Polling	August 2–5, 2013	520	± 4.3%	48%	33%	—	—	19%
20/20 Insight, LLC	May 7–9, 2013	1,483	± 2.5%	42%	45%	—	—	13%
Public Policy Polling	February 15–18, 2013	602	± 4%	46%	38%	—	—	16%
Public Policy Polling	November 30–December 2, 2012	729	± 3.6%	46%	38%	—	—	17%

Hypothetical polling

Poll source	Date(s) administered	Sample size	Margin of error	Nathan Deal (R)	Stacey Abrams (D)	Undecided
Public Policy Polling	August 2–5, 2013	520	± 4.3%	47%	34%	19%
20/20 Insight, LLC	May 7–9, 2013	1,483	± 2.5%	45%	39%	17%

Poll source	Date(s) administered	Sample size	Margin of error	Nathan Deal (R)	John Barrow (D)	Undecided
Public Policy Polling	February 15–18, 2013	602	± 4%	48%	38%	14%
Public Policy Polling	November 30 – December 2, 2012	729	± 3.6%	44%	40%	16%

Poll source	Date(s) administered	Sample size	Margin of error	Nathan Deal (R)	Scott Holcomb (D)	Undecided
Public Policy Polling	August 2–5, 2013	520	± 4.3%	48%	28%	24%
20/20 Insight, LLC	May 7–9, 2013	1,483	± 2.5%	41%	41%	18%

Poll source	Date(s) administered	Sample size	Margin of error	Nathan Deal (R)	Kasim Reed (D)	Undecided
Public Policy Polling	February 15–18, 2013	602	± 4%	48%	38%	14%
Public Policy Polling	November 30 – December 2, 2012	729	± 3.6%	47%	40%	13%

Hypothetical runoff polling

Poll source	Date(s) administered	Sample size	Margin of error	Nathan Deal (R)	Jason Carter (D)	Other	Undecided
NBC News/Marist	October 26–30, 2014	603 LV	± 4%	50%	46%	<1%	4%
NBC News/Marist	October 26–30, 2014	875 RV	± 3.3%	48%	45%	1%	6%

=== Results ===
2014 Georgia gubernatorial election
Party	Candidate	Votes	%	±%
Republican	Nathan Deal (incumbent)	1,345,237	52.74%	−0.28%
Democratic	Jason Carter	1,144,794	44.88%	+1.91%
Libertarian	Andrew Hunt	60,185	2.36%	−1.65%
Write-in		432	0.02%	+0.02%
Total votes		2,550,648	100.00%	N/A
Republican hold				

==== Counties that flipped from Republican to Democratic ====
- Douglas (largest town: Douglasville)
- Henry (largest city: Stockbridge)
- Newton (largest town: Covington)

==== Counties that flipped from Democratic to Republican ====
- Baker (largest city: Newton)
- Brooks (largest city: Quitman)
- Clinch (largest city: Homerville)
- Early (largest city: Blakely)
- McIntosh (largest municipality: Darien)
- Mitchell (largest municipality: Camilla)
- Peach (largest municipality: Fort Valley)
- Webster (largest town: Preston)
