= Nathan Deal =

American politician (born 1942)

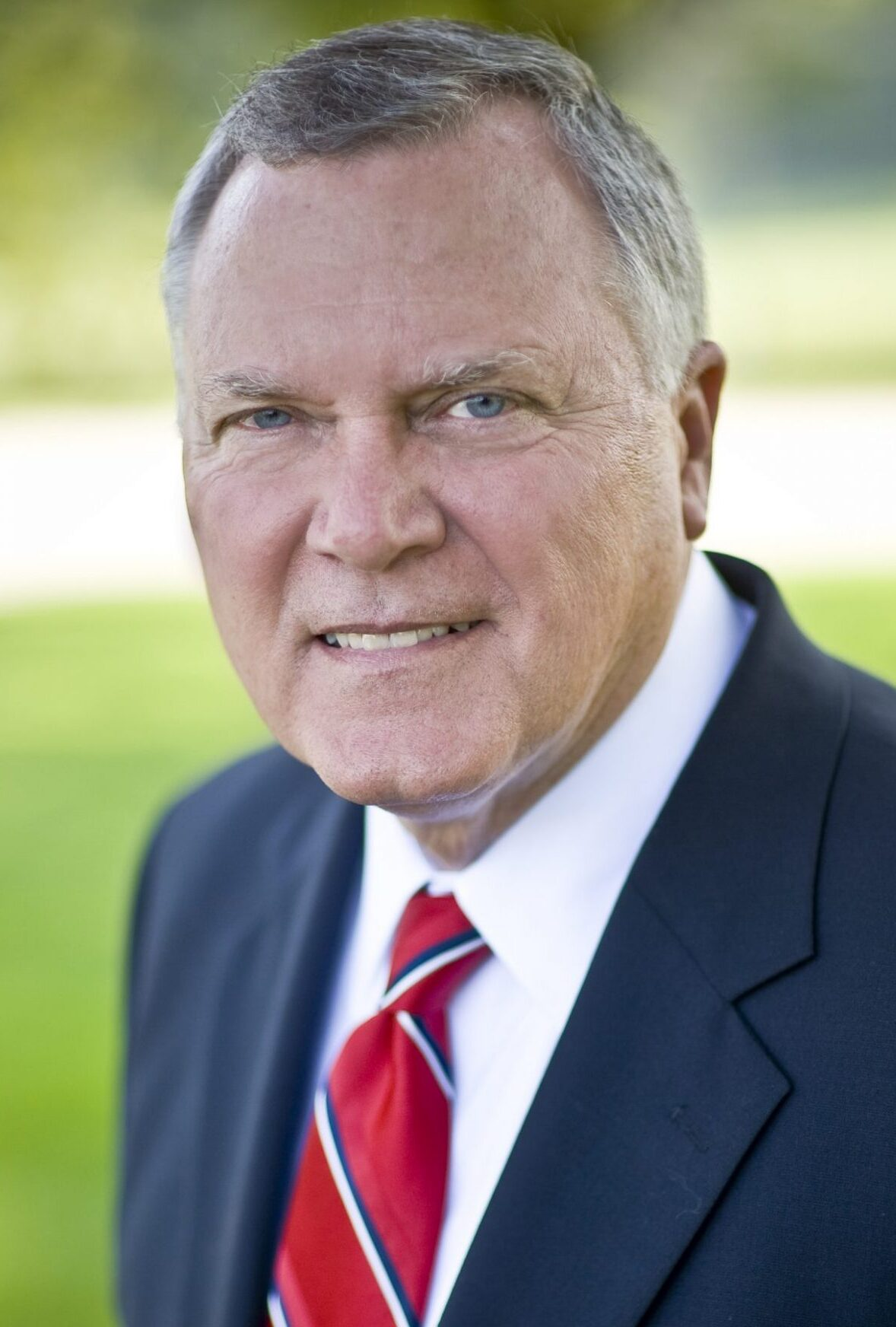
- Official portrait, 2011

82nd Governor of Georgia
- In office January 10, 2011 – January 14, 2019
- Lieutenant: Casey Cagle
- Preceded by: Sonny Perdue
- Succeeded by: Brian Kemp

Member of the U.S. House of Representatives from Georgia
- In office January 3, 1993 – March 21, 2010
- Preceded by: Ed Jenkins
- Succeeded by: Tom Graves
- Constituency: 9th district (1993–2003); 10th district (2003–2007); 9th district (2007–2010)

Member of the Georgia State Senate from the 49th district
- In office January 3, 1981 – January 3, 1993
- Preceded by: Howard Overby
- Succeeded by: Jane Hemmer

Personal details
- Born: John Nathan Deal; August 25, 1942 (age 84) Millen, Georgia, U.S.
- Party: Democratic (before 1995); Republican (1995–present)
- Spouse(s): Sandra Dunagan (m. 1966; died 2022) Brenda Micali (m. 2025)
- Children: 4
- Education: Mercer University (BA, JD)

Military service
- Allegiance: United States
- Branch/service: United States Army
- Years of service: 1966–1968
- Rank: Captain
- Deal's voice Deal on his concerns with the planned Affordable Care Act. Recorded June 24, 2009

John Nathan Deal (born August 25, 1942) is an American politician and former lawyer who served as the 82nd governor of Georgia from 2011 to 2019. A Republican, he previously served as a member of the U.S. House of Representatives.

Deal served in the Georgia State Senate from 1981 to 1993, the last two years as president pro tempore of the senate. He faced a crowded field of candidates in the Republican primary when he ran for governor in 2010, ultimately facing former Georgia Secretary of State Karen Handel in a tightly contested primary runoff election, and won by fewer than 2,500 votes. In the general election, Deal defeated the Democratic opponent, former governor Roy Barnes, and succeeded term-limited Sonny Perdue in 2011. He won his re-election campaign for governor in 2014 against Democrat Jason Carter.

Deal came to prominence in 2014 when he signed into law the Safe Carry Protection Act, known by critics as the "Guns Everywhere Law", which allows residents with a permit to carry a concealed weapon to bring firearms into most public areas, including churches, school zones, government buildings and certain sections of airports. He was barred by term limits in 2018 and was succeeded by outgoing Secretary of State Brian Kemp.

== Early life and career ==
Deal was born on August 25, 1942, in the town of Millen and grew up on a farm in Sandersville, Georgia. His parents, Mary (née Mallard) and Noah Jordan Deal, were teachers.

He attended Mercer University in Macon, where he earned his bachelor and law degrees with honors. After he earned his Juris Doctor degree in 1966, he joined the United States Army, where he earned the rank of captain.

Deal spent twenty-three years in private law practice. He was also a criminal prosecutor, a Hall County juvenile court judge, and a Northeastern Judicial Circuit superior court judge. In 1980, he was elected to the Georgia State Senate as a Democrat in District 49.

In November 1990, he was elected by his party to be the President Pro Tempore, the second highest ranking position in the chamber. Democrat Jane Hemmer replaced him in the Senate, but she was defeated by Republican Casey Cagle two years later.

== U.S. House of Representatives (1993–2010) ==
=== Elections ===
Deal was first elected to Congress in November 1992 as a Democrat, succeeding eight-term incumbent Ed Jenkins in Georgia's 9th congressional district. He was re-elected as a Democrat in 1994.

However, on April 11, 1995, shortly after Republicans assumed control of the U.S. House of Representatives for the first time in 40 years, Deal joined the Republican Party, which was led by Speaker Newt Gingrich, a fellow Georgian. Years later, Gingrich said that Deal became a Republican because he liked what he saw in the Contract With America.

Deal was handily re-elected in his first election as a Republican in the 1996 general election, even though Jenkins endorsed his Democratic opponent, attorney and state representative McCracken "Ken" Poston, who represented much of the congressional district's northwestern portion. This was the first time his district had elected a Republican for a full term since Reconstruction. Only one other Democrat besides Poston has won even 30 percent of the vote since Deal switched parties.

Deal was unopposed for re-election in 1998, 2002, and 2004 and defeated an underfunded Democratic candidate in 2000. His district was renumbered the 10th District in 2003, but became the 9th again after a mid-decade redistricting in 2006.

The 9th had turned increasingly Republican at the federal level; apart from Jimmy Carter, a Democratic presidential candidate last carried it in 1960. However, conservative Democrats continued to hold most local offices as well as most of its seats in the General Assembly. However, Republicans began whittling away elected posts in the 1990s, helped by party switchers like Deal. By the turn of the millennium, there were almost no elected Democrats left above the county level in the district.

In November 2006, Deal was re-elected 77%–23%. His Democratic opponent was John Bradbury, a former elementary school teacher turned truck driver. His district, already heavily Republican, became even more Republican after the mid-decade redistricting pushed it further into the Atlanta suburbs.

=== Tenure ===
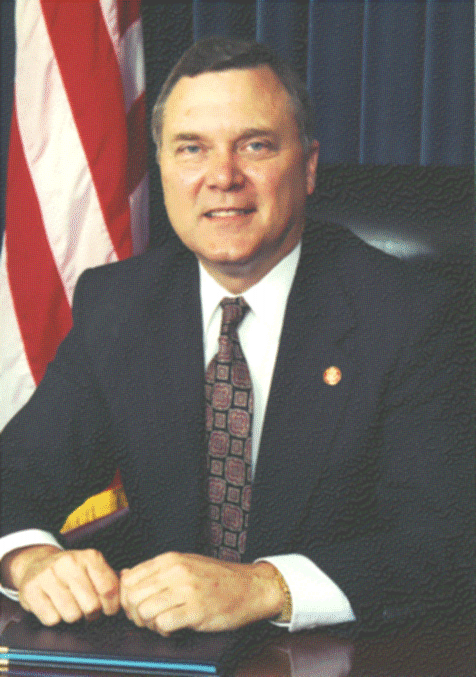
Deal early in his congressional career

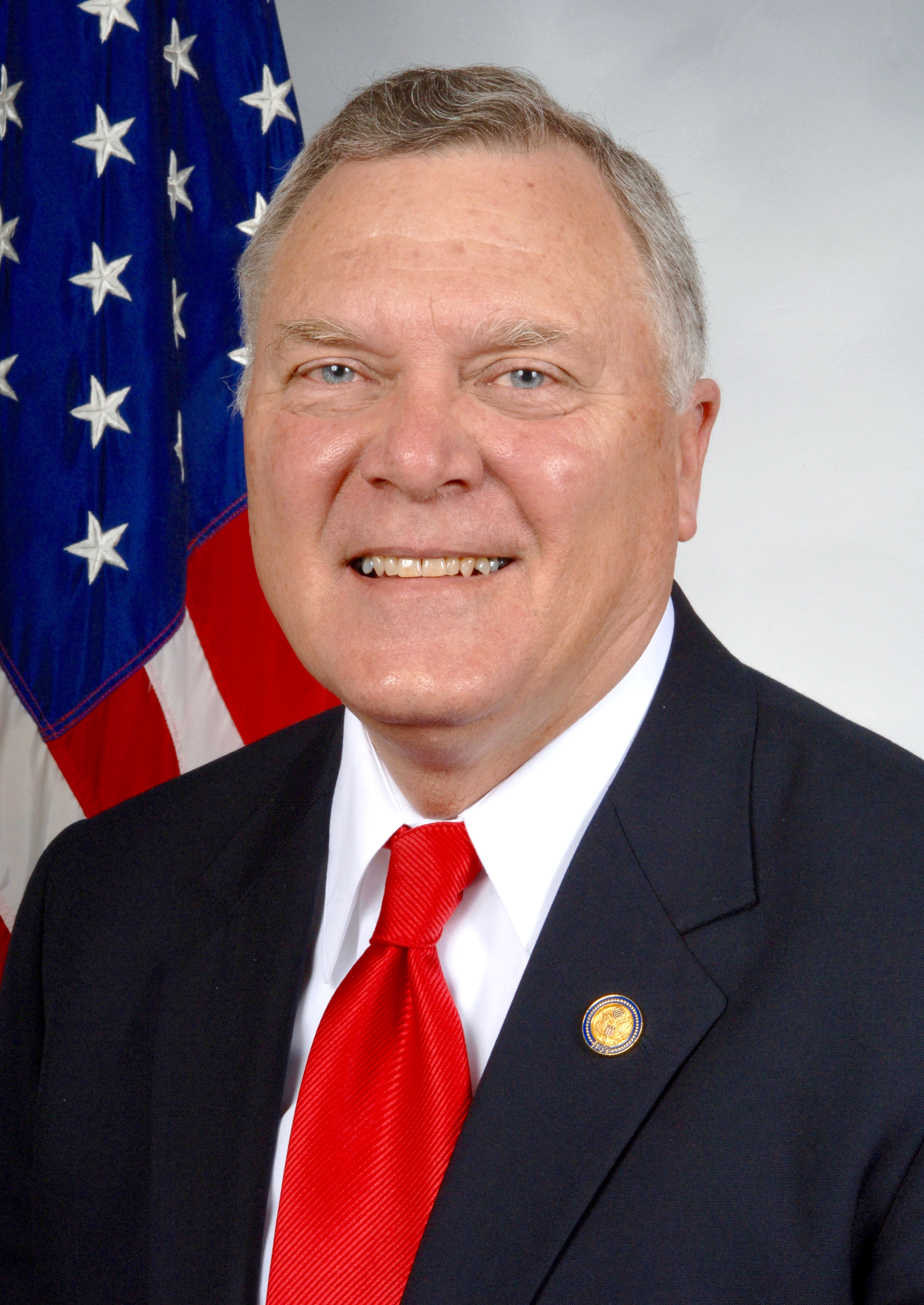
Deal during the 110th Congress

Deal's voting record was relatively moderate in his first term, getting ratings in the 60s from the American Conservative Union (ACU). He moved sharply to the right after his party switch and voted for all four articles of impeachment against Bill Clinton. From 1996 onward, he garnered ratings of 90 or higher from the ACU.

During his 17 years in Congress, Deal rose to chair the Health Subcommittee of Energy and Commerce, where he became a noted expert on entitlement reform and health care policy.

Deal introduced H.R. 698, the Citizenship Reform Act, which would eliminate birthright citizenship for undocumented immigrants in the U.S. The 14th Amendment begins "All persons born or naturalized in the United States, and subject to the jurisdiction thereof, are citizens of the United States. ... " Deal's argument is that undocumented immigrants (and their children) are not subject to U.S. jurisdiction.

=== Committee assignments ===
- Committee on Energy and Commerce
  - Subcommittee on Communications, Technology and the Internet
  - Subcommittee on Health (Ranking Member)
  - Subcommittee on Oversight and Investigations

=== Recovery Services, Inc. controversy ===
The Office of Congressional Ethics released a report on March 30, 2010, that concluded Deal appeared to have improperly used his office staff to pressure Georgia officials to continue the state vehicle inspection program that generated hundreds of thousands of dollars a year for his family's auto salvage business. Deal stated: "I have done nothing wrong and am not going to let this tarnish my ... record of public service."

The Office of Congressional Ethics (OCE), released their investigative report (Review No. 09-1022) on March 30, 2010. The report stipulates,

Representative Nathan Deal and his business partner own Recovery Services, Inc. a/k/a Gainesville Salvage & Disposal ('GSD'), located in Gainesville, Georgia ... The OCE does not take a position on Representative Deal's motivations for inserting himself into discussions of potential modifications to a state vehicle inspection program ... The OCE reviews the facts as presented at the time of review and does not take a position on whether Representative Deal's income from GSD was mistakenly reported as earned income since 2006 on his federal income taxes ... [F]or all the reasons stated above, the OCE Board recommends further review by the Committee on Standards of Official Conduct.

=== Resignation from Congress ===
On March 1, 2010, 29 days before the official release of the ethics report, Deal resigned his seat, which he said, excluded him from the Office of Congressional Ethics' jurisdiction. Although this seemed too coincidental for some, Deal maintained in a speech to supporters that the resignation was so that he could "devote [his] full energies" to the gubernatorial campaign.

Before returning to Georgia to run for governor, Deal cast his final congressional vote against the Patient Protection and Affordable Care Act, also known as Obamacare.

==== 2011 ethics investigation ====
In 2011, then Georgia Government Transparency and Campaign Finance Commission Executive Secretary Stacey Kalberman and Deputy Executive Secretary Sherilyn Streiker launched an ethics investigation into Deal's campaign finances during his 2010 gubernatorial race. According to the complaint, Deal had used state campaign funds to pay legal bills stemming from a federal ethics investigation when he was in Congress, that he had personally profited from his gubernatorial campaign's $135,000 rental of aircraft from a company he partly owned, and that he had accepted campaign contributions beyond the legal limits. The campaign also paid a total of $135,000 to consulting companies which were owned by Deal's daughter-in-law and the father of Chris Riley, Deal's chief of staff.

As Kalberman and Streiker were preparing to serve subpoenas to Deal, his chief of staff, and others involved in the case, Kalberman's salary was cut by $35,000 and Streiker was ousted from her position. Soon after, Kalberman was forced to resign and was replaced by Holly LaBerge, who was recruited by the governor's office.

On July 23, 2012, the ethics commission cleared Deal of major ethics violations while finding he made "technical defects" in a series of personal financial and campaign finance reports. In July 2012, Deal agreed to pay $3,350 in administrative fees to resolve violations of campaign finance and disclosure laws.

Holly LaBerge, the head of the ethics commission that cleared Deal of major ethics violations, claimed in July 2014 that Ryan Teague, Deal's counsel, called her to say: "It was not in the agency's best interest for these cases to go to a hearing ... nor was it in their best political interest either." Deal has stated that he is "not aware of any communications along those lines".

== Governor of Georgia (2011–2019) ==
=== 2010 gubernatorial election ===
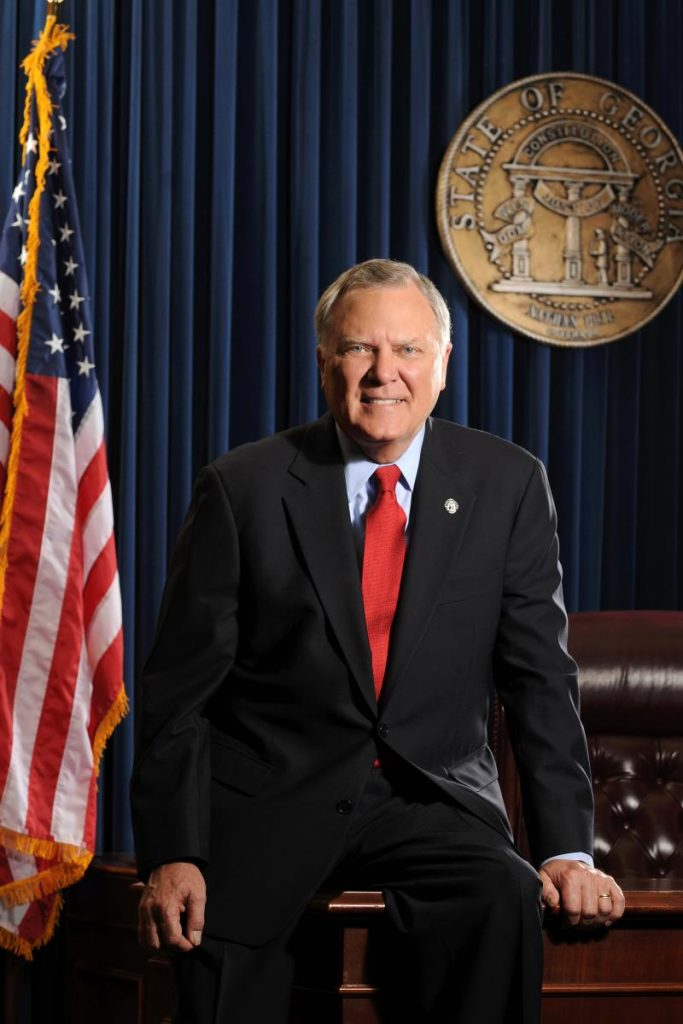
Alternate official portrait, c. 2011

Incumbent Republican Governor Sonny Perdue was term-limited in 2010. Seven candidates filed to run in the Republican primary. In the initial Republican primary in July, no candidate received the 50% threshold to win the primary outright. Georgia Secretary of State Karen Handel ranked first with 34%, qualifying for the run-off election. Deal, ranked second with 23% of the vote, also qualified for the run-off election.

Candidates who didn't qualify included State Senator Eric Johnson (20%), Insurance Commissioner John Oxendine (16%), State Senator Jeff Chapman (3%), businessman Ray McBerry (3%), and businessman Otis Putnam (0%). Deal performed the strongest in the northern part of the state, where he lives and represented in Congress. However, he also won some counties in the southern part of the state, such as Candler (30%) and Tift (24%). He won five counties with a majority including his home of Hall (64%), Dade (56%), Walker (56%), White (53%), and Stephens (53%).

The run-off election between Handel and Deal was very competitive. Deal was endorsed by former House Speaker Newt Gingrich, U.S. Representative Jack Kingston, and former Arkansas Governor Mike Huckabee. Handel was endorsed by Arizona Governor Jan Brewer and former Alaska Governor Sarah Palin.

On August 10, Deal defeated Handel 50.2%-49.8%, a difference of just 2,519 votes. Handel performed well in the western and eastern borders of the state, as well as the counties surrounding Atlanta. She won the heavily populated Fulton County with 71%, her best performance in the state, followed by Glascock (70%) and Burke (70%). Deal's two best counties were Taliaferro (80%) and Hall (79%).

In the general election, Deal faced former governor and state senator Roy Barnes (D) and John Monds (L). Barnes previously won the 1998 gubernatorial election with 52% of the vote, and lost re-election in 2002 to State Senator Sonny Perdue 51%-46%. Perdue was the first Georgia Republican Governor since Reconstruction. During the 2010 election, Deal tried to connect Barnes with President Barack Obama. Barnes said "if you would listen to what is being said, you would have thought that this is an election for president of the United States." Barnes also tried to distance himself from Obama, saying his health care law was "the greatest failure of political leadership in my lifetime". On November 3, Deal defeated Barnes 53%-43%.

=== 2014 gubernatorial election ===
Deal ran for re-election in 2014. He defeated two primary challengers and defeated Democratic State Senator Jason Carter in the general election with 53% of the vote to Carter's 45%.

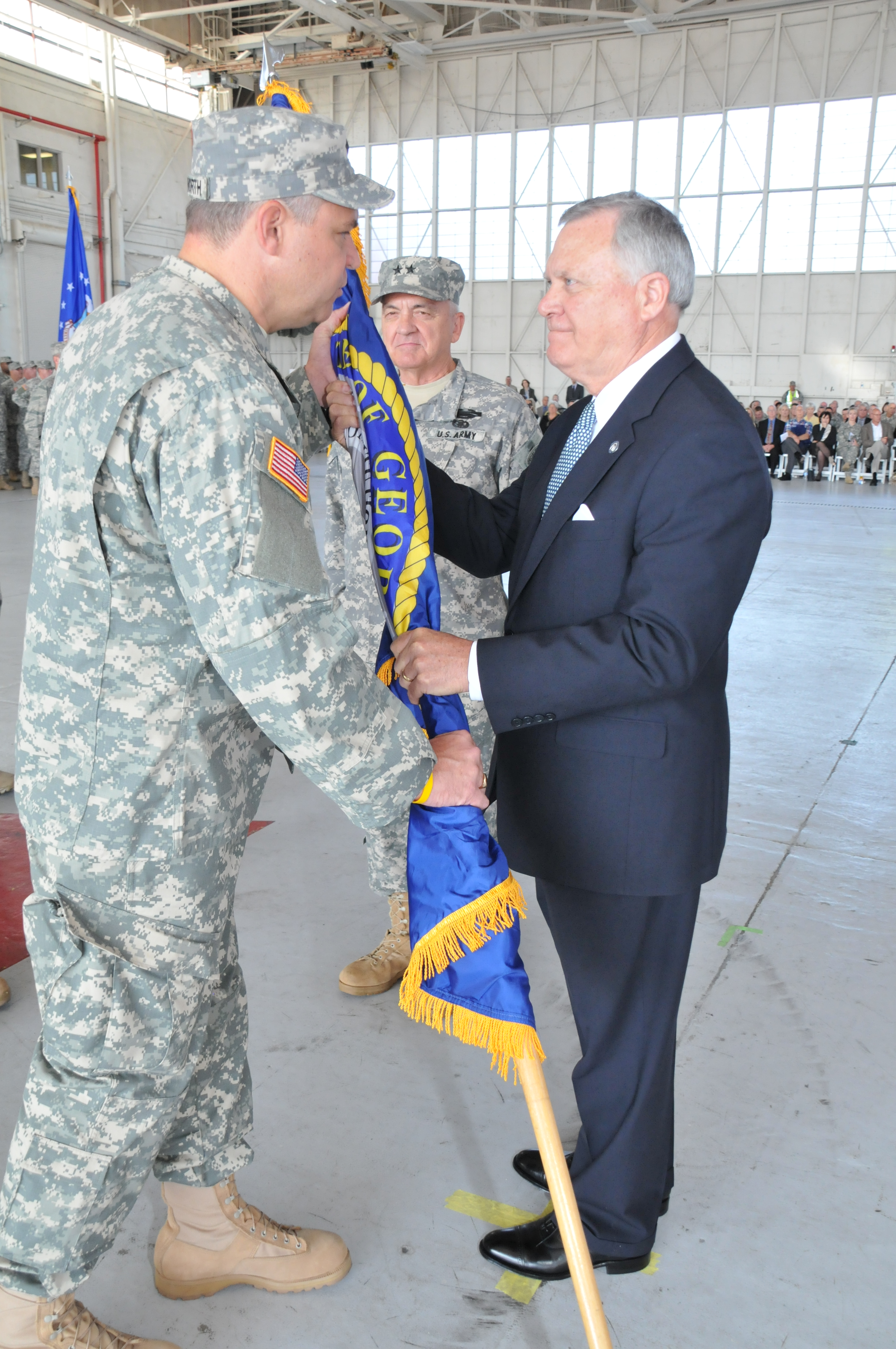
Deal meeting with Georgia National Guardsman in Marietta, Georgia, September 2011

=== Inauguration ===
Deal took office as governor on January 10, the second Monday of 2011. His second inauguration took place on January 12, 2015.

=== Supreme Court expansion ===
As Governor, Deal expanded the Supreme Court, adding two more justices to the court.

=== Immigration ===
In 2011, despite protests outside his office and threats of boycotts, Deal signed Georgia HB 87 into law, which increased the state's enforcement powers in regards to illegal immigration, as well as required many employers to determine whether their newly hired employees are undocumented immigrants or not.

=== Criminal justice reform ===
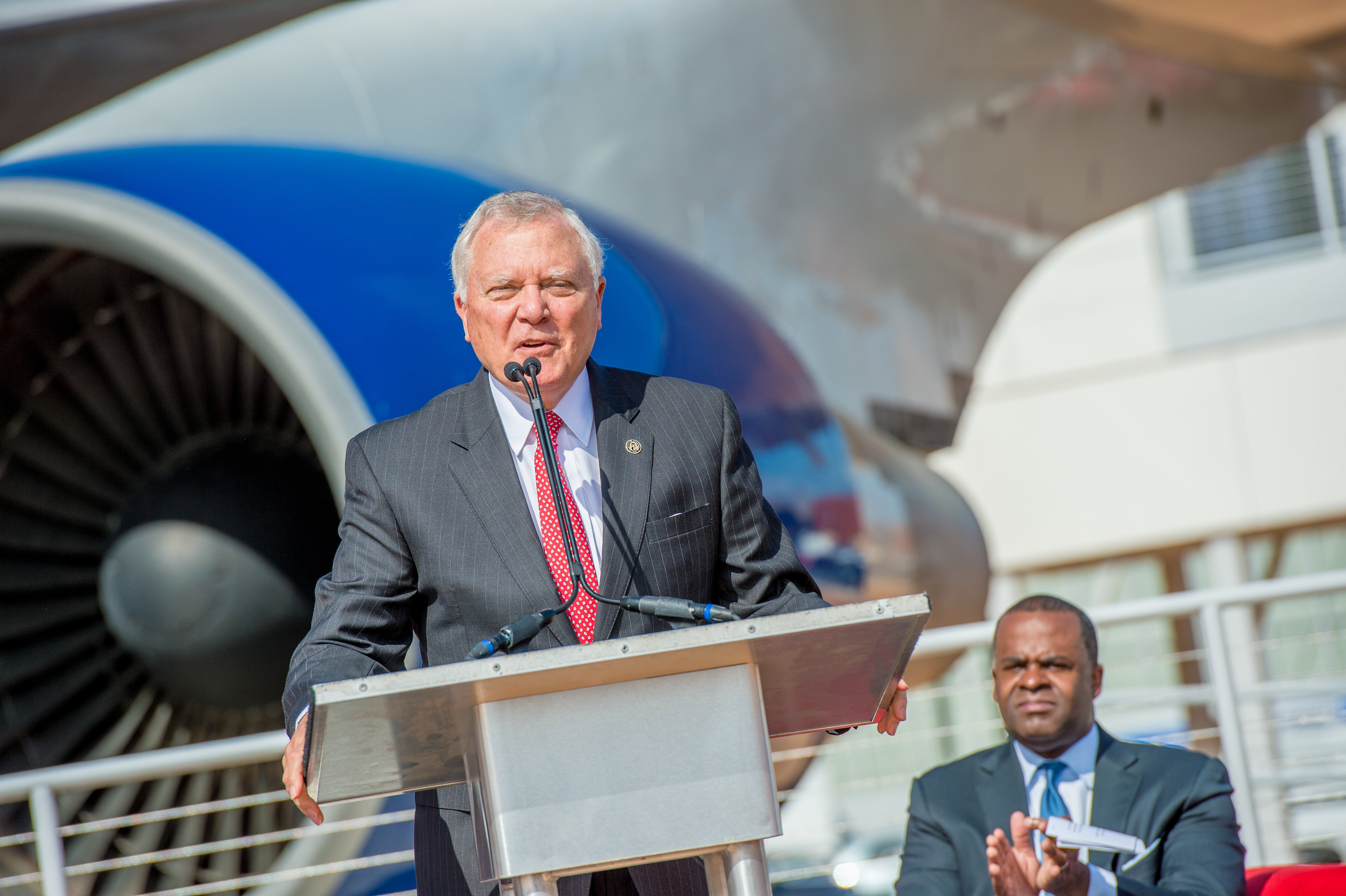
Deal in Atlanta, March 2017

In 2011, Georgia was in the midst of a criminal justice crisis. The prison population had doubled in the past two decades to 56,000, along with the state's incarceration budget. The recidivism rate was 30 percent for adults and 65 percent for juveniles. In response, Deal commissioned the Georgia Criminal Justice Reform Council, tasked with performing an exhaustive review of the state's current system, identifying key areas of focus and providing recommendations for reforms. These areas included increased funding and support for accountability courts, overhauling the juvenile justice system, and implementing prisoner re-entry initiatives. The council's work resulted in bipartisan legislation that caused Georgia to avoid the need for 5,000 additional prison beds over 5 years and saved taxpayers at least $264 million. A 2014 study showed that "prison sentences imposed on African-American offenders have dropped by 20 percent."

On April 25, 2013, Deal signed HB 349 into law, which enacted a second round of criminal justice reforms. These reforms took a "smart on crime" approach and were based on recommendations from the Special Council on Criminal Justice Reform. This law gave those who, while locked up, have earned money toward college in the form of a HOPE Scholarship G-E-D Voucher the ability to use that money up to two years after their release. In addition, Deal reinvested $5 million to create a voluntary grant program that gives communities incentives to offer judges more non-confinement sentencing options. These could include substance abuse treatment or family counseling.

With the help of the Council and the Vera Institute of Justice, Deal developed extensive performance measures to track the success of previous reforms to ensure they were enhancing public safety and saving taxpayer dollars. The Atlanta Journal-Constitution reported, "Since 2007 alone, more than three-dozen such courts have opened their doors across Georgia. In the first quarter of 2014, more than 4,100 offenders were enrolled in the state's 105 accountability courts, and many of these participants would likely be in prison without this alternative."

On April 25, 2014, Deal announced the creation of the Governor's Interfaith Council, composed of religious leaders across Georgia, to expand upon recent criminal justice reforms. These programs and council advisors will implement cost-effective strategies will work to increase the number of former offenders returning to the workforce and supporting their families. By removing barriers to employment, housing and education for rehabilitated offenders, a larger number of returning citizens are able to rejoin the workforce and support their families. Some of Deal's initiatives include education and jobs training programs, "banning the box" and creation of the Department of Community Supervision, which streamlines re-entry programs across various state agencies.

=== Safe Carry Protection Act ===
In 2014, Deal signed House Bill (H.B.) 60, the Safe Carry Protection Act, referred to by critics as the "Guns Everywhere" Law. Deal stated that gun rights through the United States Constitution's Second Amendment are important to people in Georgia. The Safe Carry Protection Act took effect on July 1, 2014, and permits licensed gun owners to carry guns into many public and private places, including places of worship, school property, bars, nightclubs, libraries, and some government buildings in Georgia. The law was supported by the Georgia Baptist Convention which included 3,600 Baptist churches in Georgia in favor of increased church autonomy, but was not supported by Catholic or Episcopalian church leaders due to their belief that it is against Jesus' teachings. By 2016, The Atlanta Journal-Constitution found that while 57% of Georgians believed that owning a gun protects people, 59% disapproved of the law itself.

=== Resettlement of Syrian refugees ===
In 2015 Deal issued an executive order ordering state agencies to "halt any involvement in accepting refugees from Syria for resettlement in the state of Georgia", resulting in the state's Department of Human Resources refusing to process applications for food stamps and other benefits filed by newly arrived Syrian refugees. Deal rescinded his order on January 4, 2016, after Georgia Attorney General Sam Olens said Deal lacked the authority to issue it.

=== Religious liberty bill veto ===
On March 28, 2016, Deal vetoed a religious liberty bill that had been passed by both houses of the Georgia State Legislature, and that had been opposed by multiple large corporations, including Salesforce.com, the Coca-Cola Company and the Home Depot.

=== Campus carry ===
On May 3, 2016, Deal vetoed a campus carry bill that had been passed by the state legislature, after a number of state legislators refused to include exceptions for child-care centers and other places on college campuses. Had Deal signed the bill into law, it would have made concealed carrying of guns legal at every public college in Georgia, so long as the carrier was 21 or older and had a proper permit. One year later, on May 4, 2017, Deal signed a revised and stricter version of the campus carry bill into law.

Deal was succeeded as governor by Brian Kemp on January 14, 2019.

== Electoral history ==
Georgia gubernatorial election, 2014
Party	Candidate	Votes	%	+
Republican	Nathan Deal (incumbent)	1,345,237	52.75%	-0.27%
Democratic	Jason Carter	1,144,794	44.89%	+1.92%
Libertarian	Andrew Hunt	60,185	2.36%	-1.65%
Write-in	David Byrne	420	0.17%	
Write-in	Matthew Jamison	10	0.00%	
Write-in	Chancey Andrell Porter	2	0.00%	
Majority		200,443	7.86%	-2.19%
Turnout		2,550,648		
Republican hold		Swing		

Georgia Republican primary gubernatorial election, 2014
Party	Candidate	Votes	%
Republican	Nathan Deal (incumbent)	430,170	72.15%
Republican	David Pennington, III	99,548	16.70%
Republican	John Barge	66,500	11.15%

Georgia gubernatorial election, 2010
Party	Candidate	Votes	%	±%
Republican	Nathan Deal	1,365,832	53.02%	−4.93%
Democratic	Roy Barnes	1,107,011	42.97%	+4.75%
Libertarian	John Monds	103,194	4.01%	+0.17%
Write-ins		124	0.00%	
Majority		258,821	10.05%	−9.68%
Turnout		2,576,161		
Republican hold		Swing		

Georgia Republican primary runoff gubernatorial election, 2010
Party	Candidate	Votes	%
Republican	Nathan Deal	291,035	50.2%
Republican	Karen Handel	288,516	49.8%

Georgia Republican primary gubernatorial election, 2010
Party	Candidate	Votes	%
Republican	Karen Handel	231,990	34.1%
Republican	Nathan Deal	155,946	22.9%
Republican	Eric Johnson	136,792	20.1%
Republican	John Oxendine	115,421	17.0%
Republican	Jeff Chapman	20,636	3.0%
Republican	Ray McBerry	17,171	2.5%
Republican	Otis Putnam	2,543	0.4%

Georgia's 9th congressional district: Results 1992–2000, 2006–2008; Georgia's 10th congressional district: Results 2002–2004
Year	District	Democratic	Votes	Pct	Republican	Votes	Pct
1992	9th	Nathan Deal	113,024	59%	Daniel Becker	77,919	41%
1994	9th	Nathan Deal (incumbent)	79,145	58%	Robert L. Castello	57,568	42%
1996	9th	McCracken "Ken" Poston	69,662	34%	Nathan Deal (incumbent)	132,532	66%
1998	9th	(no candidate)			Nathan Deal (incumbent)	122,713	100%
2000	9th	James Harrington	60,360	25%	Nathan Deal (incumbent)	183,171	75%
2002	10th	(no candidate)			Nathan Deal (incumbent)	129,242	100%
2004	10th	(no candidate)			Nathan Deal (incumbent)	219,136	100%
2006	9th	John D. Bradbury	39,240	23%	Nathan Deal (incumbent)	128,685	77%
2008	9th	Jeff Scott	70,401	25%	Nathan Deal (incumbent)	216,925	75%

== Personal life ==
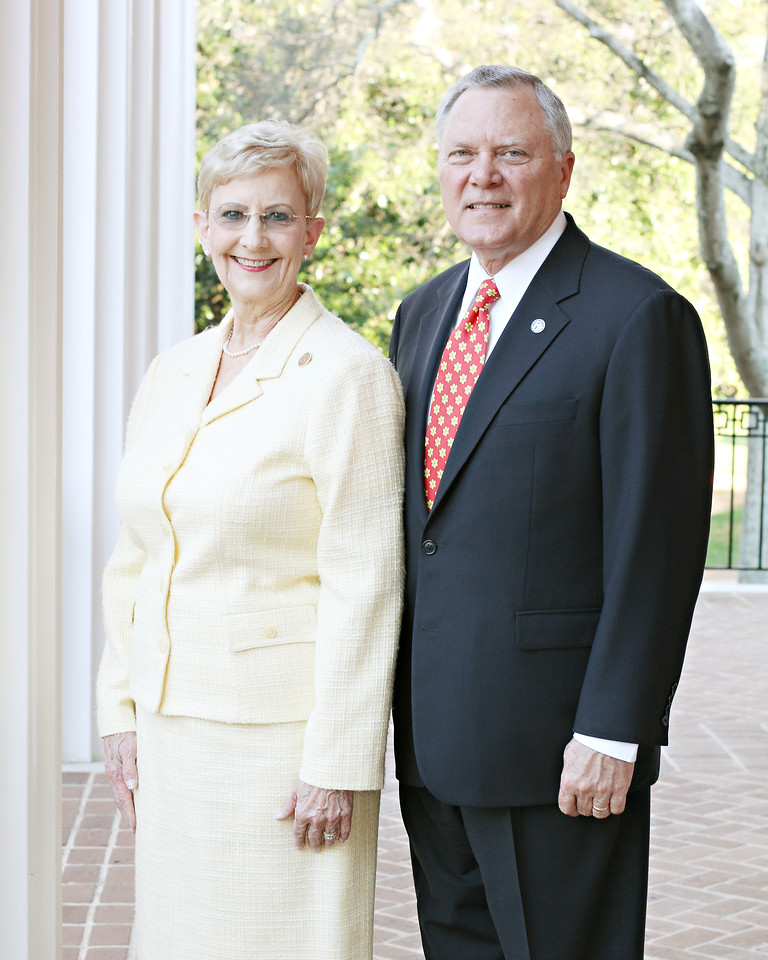
Joint-official portraits of Deal and his wife, Sandra, in 2011 as Governor and First Lady of Georgia.

Deal married Sandra Dunagan in 1966, and they had four children. Dunagan died in August 2022.

Deal married Brenda Micali in June 2025.

== Honours ==
- The Order of the Rising Sun, Gold and Silver Star (2023)

== See also ==
- Georgia gubernatorial election, 2010
- List of American politicians who switched parties in office
- List of United States representatives who switched parties

U.S. House of Representatives
Preceded by Ed Jenkins	Member of the U.S. House of Representatives from Georgia's 9th congressional district 1993–2003	Succeeded by Charlie Norwood
Preceded by Charlie Norwood	Member of the U.S. House of Representatives from Georgia's 10th congressional district 2003–2007	Succeeded by Charlie Norwood
Preceded by Charlie Norwood	Member of the U.S. House of Representatives from Georgia's 9th congressional district 2007–2010	Succeeded by Tom Graves
Party political offices
New office	Chair of the Blue Dog Coalition for Policy; 1995; Served alongside: Gary Condit (Administration), John S. Tanner (Communications)	Succeeded by Collin Peterson
Preceded by Sonny Perdue	Republican nominee for Governor of Georgia; 2010, 2014	Succeeded by Brian Kemp
Political offices
Preceded by Sonny Perdue	Governor of Georgia; 2011–2019	Succeeded by Brian Kemp
U.S. order of precedence (ceremonial)
Preceded by Roy Barnes as Former Governor	Order of precedence of the United States; Within Georgia	Succeeded by Jack Markell as Former Governor
Preceded by Roy Barnes as Former Governor	Order of precedence of the United States; Outside Georgia	Succeeded by John G. Rowland as Former Governor
