= Jason Carter (politician) =

American politician (born 1975)

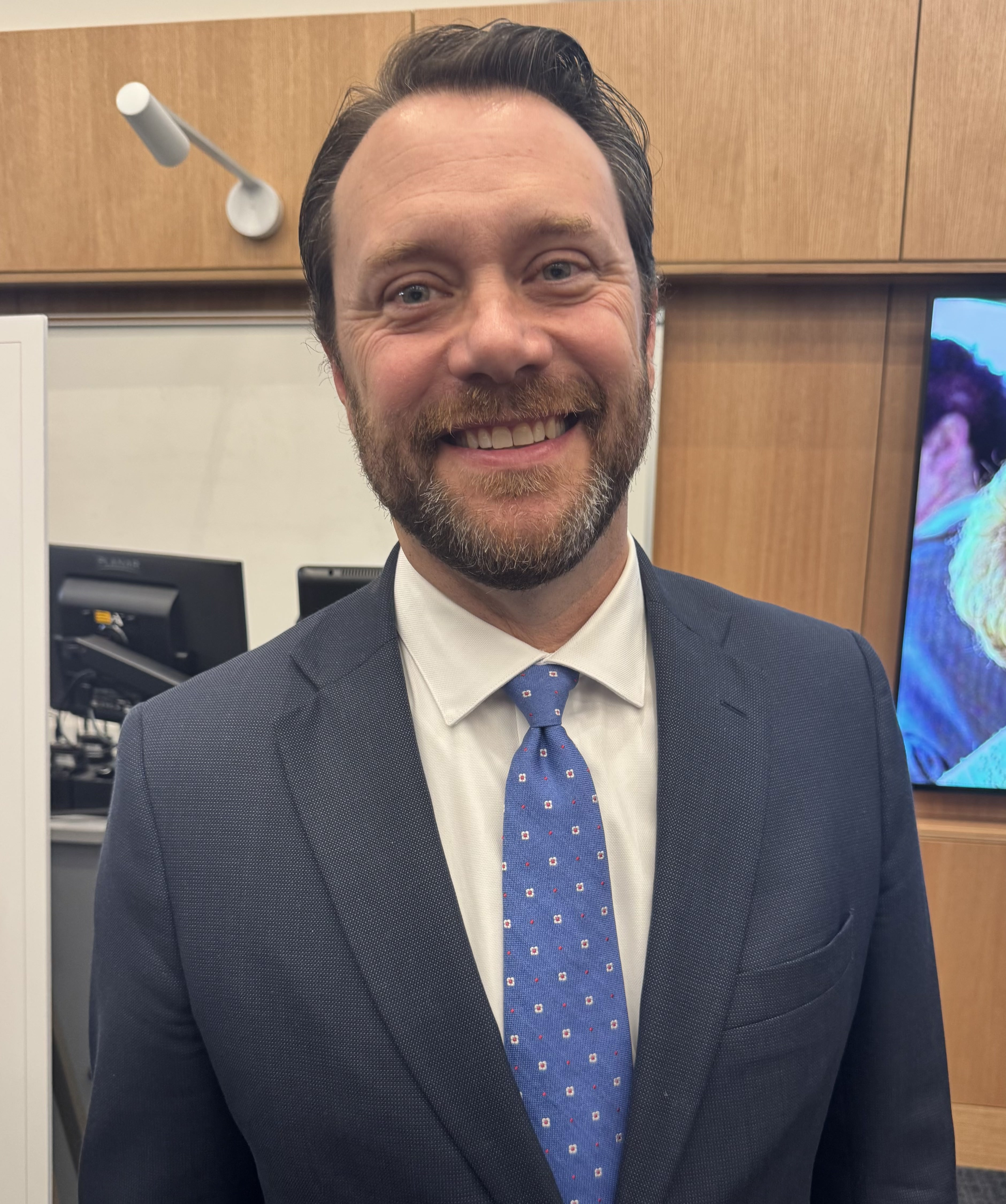
- Carter in 2025

Member of the Georgia State Senate from the 42nd district
- In office May 20, 2010 – January 12, 2015
- Preceded by: David I. Adelman
- Succeeded by: Elena Parent

Personal details
- Born: Jason James Carter; August 7, 1975 (age 50) Decatur, Georgia, U.S.
- Party: Democratic
- Spouse: Kate Carter (m. 2000)
- Children: 2
- Parent: Jack Carter (father)
- Relatives: Jimmy Carter (paternal grandfather); Rosalynn Carter (paternal grandmother); Amy Carter (aunt); James Beverly Langford (maternal grandfather); James Earl Carter Sr. (great-grandfather); Lillian Gordy Carter (great-grandmother); Hugh Carter Jr. (first cousin twice removed); Bianca Lawson (third cousin); Sky Blu (third cousin); Redfoo (third cousin once removed)
- Education: Duke University (BA); University of Georgia (JD)

Jason James Carter (born August 7, 1975) is an American lawyer and politician from the state of Georgia. Carter served in the Georgia State Senate from 2010 to 2015 and was the Democratic Party nominee for governor of Georgia in 2014. He is the grandson of former U.S. President Jimmy Carter.

== Early life and career ==
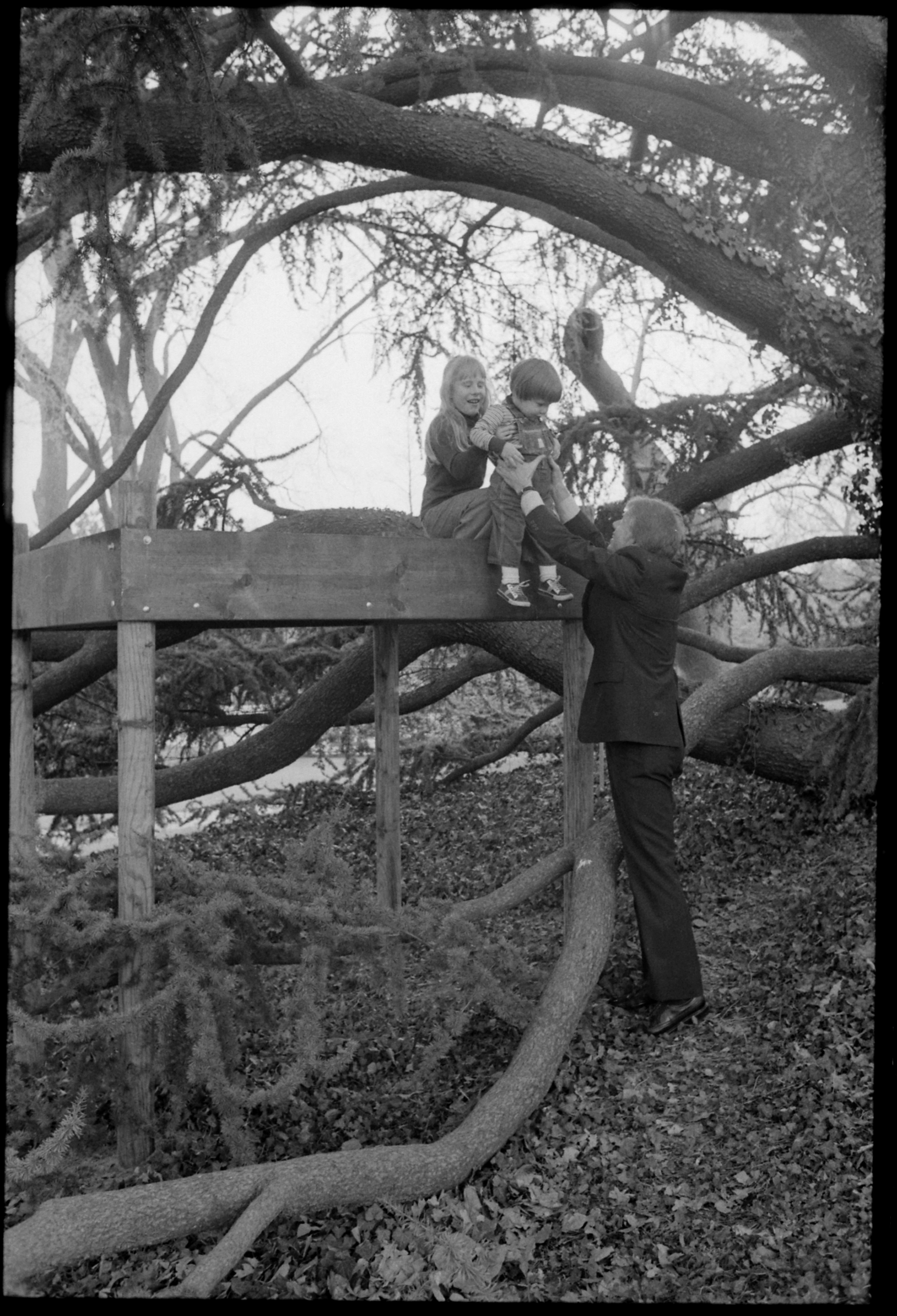
Jimmy Carter with his grandson, Jason Carter, and Amy Carter in a tree house on the White House grounds

Carter was born at Emory University Hospital on August 7, 1975. A ninth-generation Georgian, he is a grandson of former president and first lady Jimmy and Rosalynn Carter and the son of Jack Carter and Judy Langford, daughter of former Georgia state senator James Beverly Langford. After graduating from Evanston Township High School, where he won the Illinois State Policy Debate championship in 1993, Carter attended Duke University, where he obtained a Bachelor of Arts with a double major in philosophy and political science.

=== Peace Corps ===
After graduating from Duke University, Carter served in the Peace Corps stationed in South Africa. In doing so he followed the example of his great grandmother, Lillian Carter (President Jimmy Carter's mother), who became a Peace Corps volunteer at age 68 and spent nearly two years in India working as a nurse with patients with leprosy. Jason Carter lived in Lochiel, South Africa, where he worked on education issues in rural areas. He learned to speak Zulu and Siswati. He wrote a book, titled Power Lines, about his experiences there.

=== Legal career ===
Carter later attended the University of Georgia School of Law, graduating summa cum laude with a Juris Doctor in 2004. He clerked for Frank M. Hull on the United States Court of Appeals for the Eleventh Circuit after graduating from law school.

In 2013, he was a partner at the law firm of Bondurant, Mixson & Elmore in Atlanta. He has represented the National Football League Players Association and won the Stuart Eizenstat Young Lawyer Award, given by the Anti-Defamation League, for his pro bono work defending voting rights.

== Georgia Senate ==
=== 2010 election ===
In a May 11, 2010 special election, Carter was elected to represent Georgia's 42nd district in the state senate. He won with 65.6% of the vote. The seat had been vacated by David I. Adelman, who became the United States Ambassador to Singapore. Carter is the first member of his family to win elected office since his grandfather was elected President of the United States. Carter was later re-elected to the Senate in the 2010 and 2012 general elections.

=== Legislation ===
In the Senate, Carter authored legislation to require the state budget to be presented in two parts: first, a separate education budget, and then a budget to fund the rest of state government.

Carter also sponsored ethics reform legislation, including proposals to limit gifts from lobbyists to legislators, to create and fully fund an independent ethics commission, and to create a non-partisan redistricting commission.

In 2012, he was awarded Common Cause's Democracy Award for his work on promoting ethics reform.

In 2014, Carter voted for House Bill (H.B.) 60, the Safe Carry Protection Act, which opponents nicknamed the "guns everywhere" bill. The Safe Carry Protection Act which took effect on July 1, 2014, permits licensed gun owners to carry guns into many public and private places. The law is supported by the Georgia Baptist Convention which includes 3,600 Baptist churches in Georgia in favor of increased church autonomy, but is not supported by Catholic or Episcopal church leaders.

=== Committee assignments ===
- Judiciary
- Science and Technology
- Special Judiciary
- Transportation
- Urban Affairs

== 2014 gubernatorial election ==
In 2013, Carter commissioned a poll of a potential race against Nathan Deal in the 2014 gubernatorial election. He subsequently announced that he would run for the Democratic nomination.

During his campaign, Carter advocated increased investment in education and technical training to help grow Georgia's film and television industry. "Georgia has seen enormous growth in film and television production, but that success is threatened unless we build the skilled workforce to fill these jobs." Carter said, and added "After years of cuts to HOPE and to our schools, industries across the state simply cannot find the skilled workers they need to fill their jobs."

Polls suggested a surprisingly close race given Georgia's recent electoral history. Real Clear Politics upgraded the race from "Leans GOP" to "Toss Up." Carter also out-raised the incumbent Deal in the second quarter.

Carter said that people in Georgia have the right to have the Sons of Confederate Veterans-backed license plate, which features an image of the Confederate flag and that he would not try to stop them if elected.

During his campaign, Carter reaffirmed his support for the legalization of same-sex marriage, stating, "Marriage equality is something I believe in and have [believed in] for a very, very, very long time since before I got into politics."

In a WSB-TV debate which aired live on C-SPAN, Carter criticized Deal's handling of the state's economy by stating that 380,000 Georgians were looking for jobs and that state government support for public education had dropped.

Carter lost his 2014 bid for the office of governor to incumbent Nathan Deal by 7.9%, receiving 44.9% of the vote.

=== Results ===
Georgia gubernatorial election, 2014
| Party | Candidate | Votes | % | ±% |
|---|---|---|---|---|
| Republican | Nathan Deal (incumbent) | 1,345,237 | 52.74% | −0.28% |
| Democratic | Jason Carter | 1,144,794 | 44.88% | +1.91% |
| Libertarian | Andrew Hunt | 60,185 | 2.36% | −1.65% |
| n/a | Write-ins | 432 | 0.02% | +0.02% |
| Total votes | | 2,550,648 | 100.0% | N/A |
| Republican hold | | | | |

== Carter Center ==
In November 2015, Carter became chair of the board of trustees of the Carter Center. He had previously served on the board since 2009.

== Personal life ==
Carter's wife, Kate, is a high school teacher and former journalist with the Athens Banner-Herald, where she won several awards. They have two sons, Henry (b. 2006) and Thomas (b. 2008).

Carter gave a eulogy at his grandfather's state funeral in January 2025.

== Bibliography ==
- Carter, Jason (2003). Power Lines: Two Years on South Africa's Borders. National Geographic. ISBN 0792241010.

Party political offices
| Preceded by Roy Barnes | Democratic nominee for Governor of Georgia; 2014 | Succeeded by Stacey Abrams |
