= 2014 United States Senate election in Georgia =

- November 4, 2014
- Turnout: 47.5% ▼
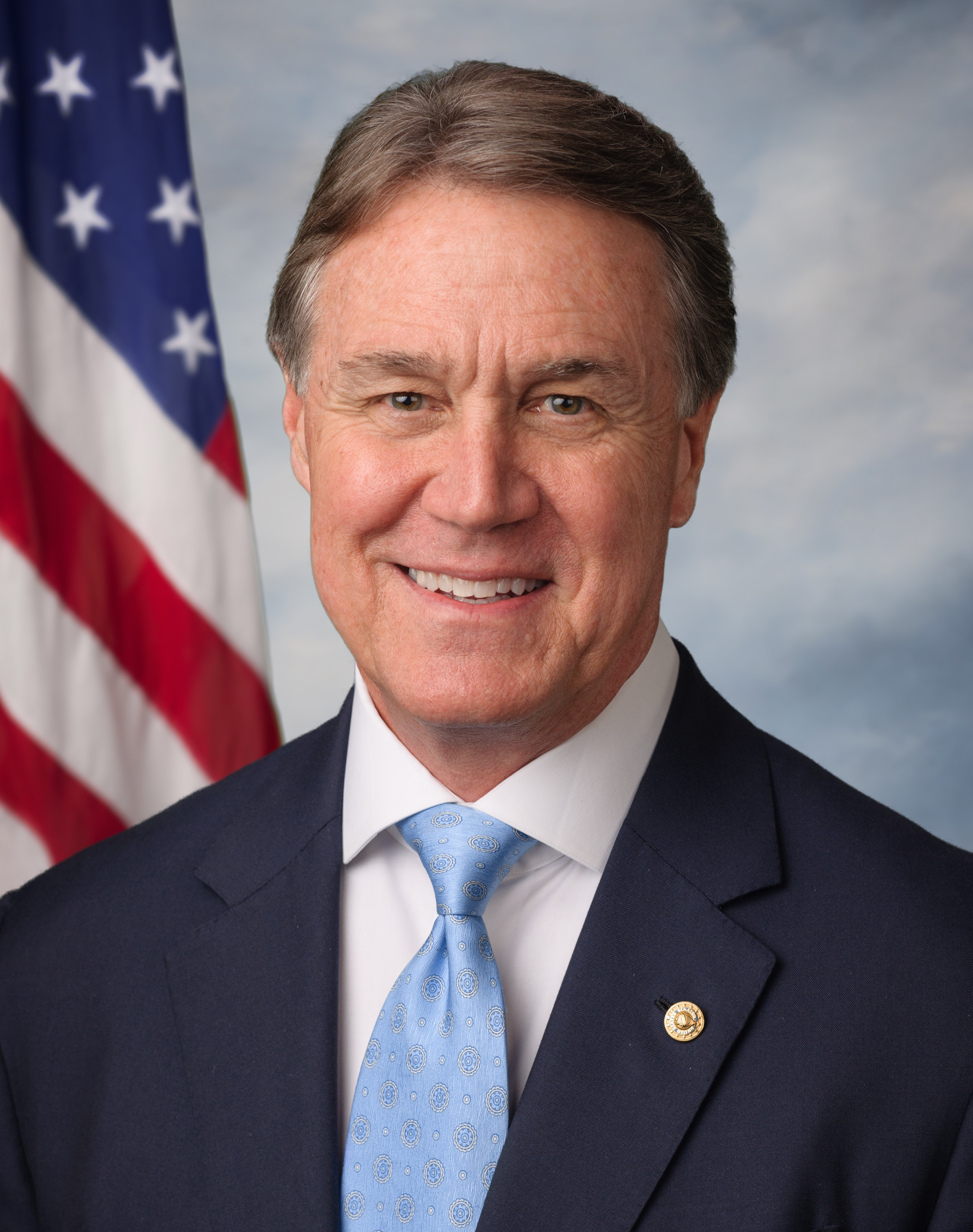

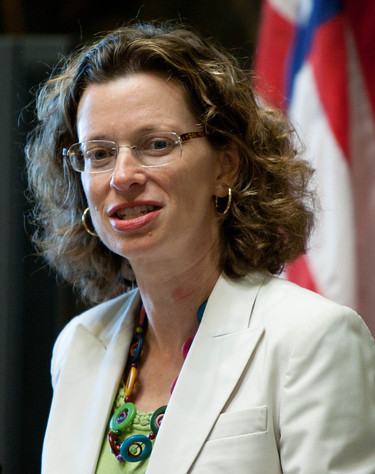
Nominee	David Perdue	Michelle Nunn
Party	Republican	Democratic
Popular vote	1,358,088	1,160,811
Percentage	52.89%	45.21%
- Perdue: 40–50% 50–60% 60–70% 70–80% 80–90% >90% Nunn: 40–50% 50–60% 60–70% 70–80% 80–90% >90% Tie: 40–50% 50% No data
U.S. Senator before election
Saxby Chambliss
Republican
Elected U.S. Senator
David Perdue
Republican

The 2014 United States Senate election in Georgia was held on November 4, 2014, to elect a member of the United States Senate to represent the State of Georgia, concurrently with the election of the governor of Georgia, to the U.S. Senate in other states, to the United States House of Representatives, and to various other state and local offices.

Incumbent Republican senator Saxby Chambliss announced on January 25, 2013, that he would not run for re-election, making it an open-seat race. After a close and contentious primary campaign, businessman David Perdue and U.S. Representative Jack Kingston advanced to a runoff for the Republican nomination, which was narrowly won by Perdue. The Democratic primary was decisively won by Points of Light CEO Michelle Nunn, the daughter of former U.S. senator Sam Nunn. Also running was Libertarian nominee Amanda Swafford, a former Flowery Branch City Councilwoman.

If no candidate had received a majority of the vote, a runoff would have been held between the top two finishers on January 6, 2015, after the 114th Congress would have been sworn in, but in the end, David Perdue defeated Michelle Nunn by a margin of 7.7%.

Perdue's victory was part of a series of Republican victories across the nation. Nunn failed to improve on Obama's losing percentages in the state from two years earlier and any changes in the state's demographics were not enough for Democrats to prevail. Nevertheless, Nunn took credit for making the party competitive in the otherwise inhospitable South: "We put Georgia in play. We have reminded people what a two-party system looks like." Nunn's efforts to appeal to white voters were largely unsuccessful, with her not achieving 25% of the white vote, with conventional wisdom at the time stating that a Democrat needed 30% of the white vote to win.

== Republican primary ==
=== Chambliss announces retirement ===
Incumbent Senator Saxby Chambliss, first elected in 2002, went into the 2014 election cycle facing significant ire from conservatives. Chambliss had infuriated conservatives during the 2011 United States debt-ceiling crisis, having been a member of the bipartisan Gang of Six that proposed a compromise solution to the crisis that was heavily criticised by right-wing groups. Chambliss had posted weak fundraising numbers heading into the 2014 cycle, and this combination meant he was widely considered vulnerable to a primary challenge.

Chambliss announced his retirement in January of 2013. U.S. Representatives Tom Price and Paul Broun had already openly been considering primary campaigns against the incumbent, and following his announcement The Atlantic opined that they, U.S. Representatives Tom Graves and Phil Gingrey, and former Georgia Secretary of State Karen Handel were likely candidates for the seat.

=== Early stages ===
In the early stages of the Republican primary campaign, the field was deemed a "clown car" by The Hill due to the prominence of far-right candidates within it. Prominent Tea Party supporter and U.S. Representative Paul Broun was the early frontrunner for the Republican nomination, with Public Policy Polling showing him with a double-digit lead over his fellow candidates. During September 2013 several prominent Republicans considered buying ads against Broun's campaign, as he was seen as unelectable due to his support for Young Earth creationism and the contention that medical schools taught "lies from the pits of hell." Broun also had a history of proposing controversial congressional amendments, most prominently a proposal to defund and privatise the Transportation Security Administration, which were considered by Republican strategists to be anathema to the wider electorate.

=== National spending ===
As the campaign drew on, businessman David Perdue and U.S. Representative Jack Kingston began to dominate the media with extensive spending, and Perdue in particular developed a lead in the polls. In order to counter the two men's spending advantage Handel relied on support from figures popular amongst the Tea Party such as Sarah Palin, but a lack of national financial support remained a consistent issue for her campaign.

=== Candidates ===
- Paul Broun, U.S. representative and candidate in 1996
- Art Gardner, patent attorney
- Phil Gingrey, U.S. representative
- Derrick E. Grayson, conservative political activist
- Karen Handel, former secretary of state of Georgia, former Susan G. Komen executive and candidate for governor in 2010
- Jack Kingston, U.S. representative
- David Perdue, Georgia Ports Authority board member, former CEO of Dollar General and Reebok and cousin of former Governor Sonny Perdue

==== Withdrew ====
- Eugene Yu, businessman, president of the Federation of Korean Associations and former deputy sheriff of Richmond County (ran for GA-12)

==== Declined ====
- Casey Cagle, lieutenant governor of Georgia
- Herman Cain, former CEO of the National Restaurant Association, former chairman of the Federal Reserve Bank of Kansas City and candidate for president in 2012
- Saxby Chambliss, incumbent U.S. senator
- Doug Collins, U.S. representative
- Erick Erickson, blogger, radio host and former member of the Macon City Council
- Newt Gingrich, former speaker of the House of Representatives and candidate for president in 2012
- Tom Graves, U.S. representative
- Brian Kemp, secretary of state of Georgia
- Ed Lindsey, majority whip of the Georgia House of Representatives (ran for GA-11)
- Kelly Loeffler, co-owner of the Women's National Basketball Association team Atlanta Dream
- Barry Loudermilk, state senator (ran for GA-11)
- Sam Olens, attorney general of Georgia
- Sonny Perdue, former governor of Georgia
- Tom Price, U.S. representative
- David Ralston, speaker of the Georgia House of Representatives
- Austin Scott, U.S. representative
- Eric Tanenblatt, chief of staff to former governor Sonny Perdue
- Ross Tolleson, state senator
- Allen West, former U.S. representative from FL-22
- Lynn Westmoreland, U.S. representative
- Rob Woodall, U.S. representative

=== Endorsements ===
Paul Broun

Federal officials

- Ron Paul, former U.S. representative (R-TX), candidate for president in 2008 and 2012

Organizations

- Association of American Physicians and Surgeons
- Citizens United
- Georgia Right to Life
- Gun Owners of America
- National Association for Gun Rights
- Republican Liberty Caucus
Karen Handel

Federal officials

- Rick Santorum, former U.S. senator from Pennsylvania, 2012 Republican presidential primary candidate
- Austin Scott, U.S. representative from GA-08

State officials

- Jan Brewer, governor of Arizona
- Joshua McKoon, state senator
- Sarah Palin, former governor of Alaska, 2008 Republican nominee for vice president of the United States

Individuals

- Erick Erickson, conservative activist and editor of RedState
- Sue Everhart, former chair of the Georgia Republican Party

Organizations

- American Future Fund
- Susan B. Anthony List
- Tea Party Express
Jack Kingston

Federal officials

- John Linder, former U.S. representative from GA-7
- Lindsay Thomas, former U.S. representative from GA-1 (Democrat)

Individuals

- L. Brent Bozell III, president of the Media Research Center
- Steve Forbes, businessman, activist, and former presidential candidate
- Sean Hannity, conservative talk-radio and television host
- Herschel Walker, professional football player and entrepreneur

Organizations

- U.S. Chamber of Commerce
David Perdue

Executive officials

- George H. W. Bush, 41st president of the United States

State officials

- Tommie Williams, state senator from the 19th district

Individuals

- Herman Cain, former CEO of the National Restaurant Association, former chairman of the Federal Reserve Bank of Kansas City and candidate for president in 2012

=== Polling ===
Poll source	Date(s) administered	Sample size	Margin of error	Paul Broun	Casey Cagle	Art Gardner	Phil Gingrey	Tom Graves	Derrick Grayson	Karen Handel	Jack Kingston	David Perdue	Tom Price	Ross Tolleson	Eugene Yu	Other/ Unsure
Harper Polling	February 11–12, 2013	?	±?	19%	—	—	18%	—	—	—	13%	—	17%	2%	—	30%
PPP	February 15–18, 2013	366	±5.1%	11%	13%	—	12%	3%	—	15%	15%	—	10%	—	—	20%
PPP	February 15–18, 2013	366	±5.1%	14%	—	—	22%	—	—	21%	18%	—	—	—	—	24%
PPP	February 15–18, 2013	366	±5.1%	15%	—	—	24%	—	—	—	18%	—	14%	—	—	28%
Landmark/Rosetta	February 15–18, 2013	483	±4.5%	10%	17%	—	15%	—	—	—	12%	—	11%	2%	—	33%
Landmark/Rosetta	March 28, 2013	570	±4.1%	16%	—	—	22%	—	—	14%	8%	1%	—	2%	—	39%
Insider Advantage	April 1, 2013	573	±4%	15%	—	—	15%	—	—	9%	14%	5%	—	—	—	37%
20/20 Insight	May 7–9, 2013	?	± ?	13%	—	—	19%	—	—	16%	18%	—	—	—	—	34%
GaPundit	May 16, 2013	1,351	±2.66%	14.14%	—	—	15.98%	—	—	15.81%	17.61%	5.77%	—	—	—	30.69%
Landmark/Rosetta	June 2013	450	±4.6%	15%	—	—	17%	—	—	14%	7%	—	—	—	—	44%
PPP	August 2–4, 2013	260	±6.1%	19%	—	—	25%	—	3%	13%	15%	5%	—	—	0%	20%
TPC	January 31 – February 1, 2014	600	±3.9%	13%	—	—	19%	—	1%	14%	11%	8%	—	—	2%	32%
HEG/AP	February 13–16, 2014	923	±3.25%	10.9%	—	0.8%	10.4%	—	0.5%	10.2%	10.9%	12.7%	—	—	0.9%	42.7%
PPP	March 5–6, 2014	324	±?	27%	—	—	14%	—	3%	9%	13%	12%	—	—	—	23%
SurveyUSA	March 16–18, 2014	508	±4.2%	11%	—	1%	12%	—	4%	10%	19%	29%	—	—	—	15%
Landmark/Rosetta	March 23–24, 2014	600	±4%	15%	—	—	13%	—	—	10%	15%	21%	—	—	—	26%
InsiderAdvantage	March 23–24, 2014	893	±3.26%	10%	—	—	8%	—	—	5%	15%	17%	—	—	—	45%
InsiderAdvantage	April 13–15, 2014	804	±3.4%	11%	—	0.5%	9%	—	0.5%	13%	15%	19%	—	—	—	32%
SurveyUSA	April 24–27, 2014	501	± 4.5%	13%	—	1%	6%	—	5%	15%	20%	26%	—	—	—	13%
InsiderAdvantage	April 27–29, 2014	737	±3.5%	14%	—	1%	12%	—	2%	21%	17%	22%	—	—	—	11%
McLaughlin & Associates*	April 28–29, 2014	400	±4.9%	8%	—	—	13%	—	—	14%	20%	17%	—	—	—	28%
NBC News/Marist	April 30 – May 5, 2014	533	±4.2%	11%	—	<1%	11%	—	1%	14%	18%	23%	—	—	—	23%
Saint Leo	May 5–6, 2014	689	±4%	13%	—	—	8%	—	1%	15%	16%	26%	—	—	—	21%
Landmark/Rosetta^	May 6, 2014	729	±3.6%	8.6%	—	—	8.5%	—	—	21%	15.1%	23.1%	—	—	—	20.1%
InsiderAdvantage	May 7, 2014	531	±4.2%	12%	—	1%	11%	—	2%	18%	17%	26%	—	—	—	13%
SurveyUSA	May 8–12, 2014	634	±4%	10%	—	1%	10%	—	3%	16%	19%	27%	—	—	—	14%
GAPundit	May 12–13, 2014	1,006	±3.1%	11%	—	2.1%	12.1%	—	2.4%	20.1%	20.5%	20.1%	—	—	—	11.7%
InsiderAdvantage	May 12–14, 2014	1,182	±2.9%	10%	—	—	9%	—	—	17%	19%	27%	—	—	—	18%
InsiderAdvantage	May 18, 2014	852	±3.36%	9.8%	—	0.3%	11.1%	—	0.7%	17.4%	16.7%	26%	—	—	—	18.1%

- ^ Internal poll for Karen Handel campaign
- * Internal poll for Jack Kingston campaign
Hypothetical polling

Poll source	Date(s) administered	Sample size	Margin of error	Saxby Chambliss	Paul Broun	Herman Cain	Erick Erickson	Karen Handel	Tom Price	Allen West	Someone more conservative	Other	Undecided
Public Policy Polling	November 30 – December 2, 2012	389	±5%	23%	6%	36%	3%	4%	4%	8%	—	5%	10%
Public Policy Polling	November 30 – December 2, 2012	389	±5%	57%	14%	—	—	—	—	—	—	—	29%
Public Policy Polling	November 30 – December 2, 2012	389	±5%	36%	—	50%	—	—	—	—	—	—	13%
Public Policy Polling	November 30 – December 2, 2012	389	±5%	51%	—	—	22%	—	—	—	—	—	26%
Public Policy Polling	November 30 – December 2, 2012	389	±5%	52%	—	—	—	23%	—	—	—	—	26%
Public Policy Polling	November 30 – December 2, 2012	389	±5%	52%	—	—	—	—	22%	—	—	—	28%
Public Policy Polling	November 30 – December 2, 2012	389	±5%	47%	—	—	—	—	—	26%	—	—	28%
Public Policy Polling	November 30 – December 2, 2012	389	±5%	38%	—	—	—	—	—	—	43%	—	19%

=== Results ===
The primary was held on May 20, 2014. No candidate won more than 50% of the vote, so a runoff was held between the top two candidates, businessman David Perdue and U.S. Representative Jack Kingston. The 30.6 percent won by Perdue was the lowest ever for a first-place finisher in a Georgia U.S. Senate primary by either party in state history.

While Perdue advancing to the runoff was expected, Kingston beating out Handel to the second spot was something of a surprise. Kingston's strong performance was attributed by journalist Tom Crawford to his dominance in the regions of Coastal Georgia around the city of Savannah and Southeast Georgia around the city of Valdosta, where he achieved absolute majorities of the vote in many counties. Handel performed strongly in metropolitan Atlanta, but these areas suffered from relatively low turnout when compared to Kingston's base.

Initial primary results by county: Perdue: 20–30%; 30–40%; 40–50%; 50–60%; Kingston: 30–40%; 40–50%; 50–60%; 60–70%; 70–80%; 80–90%; Handel: 20–30%; 30–40%; 40–50%; Gingrey: 30–40%; 40–50%; Broun: 30–40%; 40–50%

Republican primary results
Party	Candidate	Votes	%
Republican	David Perdue	185,466	30.64%
Republican	Jack Kingston	156,157	25.80%
Republican	Karen Handel	132,944	21.96%
Republican	Phil Gingrey	60,735	10.03%
Republican	Paul Broun	58,297	9.63%
Republican	Derrick Grayson	6,045	1.00%
Republican	Art Gardner	5,711	0.94%
Total votes		605,355	100.00%

=== Runoff ===
Kingston and Perdue advancing to the runoff was welcome news to establishment Republicans, as both men were relatively socially moderate and were not considered to be at risk of squandering the Senate seat with controversial comments. Kingston, widely considered the more conservative of the two men, immediately moved to secure right-wing support, declaring that he was the last conservative in the race against the "moderate" Perdue. Kingston quickly secured support from much of Georgia's Republican congressional delegation, but this had the unintentional effect of allowing Perdue to portray himself as an outsider.

The nine-week runoff was defined by negative campaigning, with both Perdue and Kingston running many attack ads. Kingston's main line of attack was that Perdue was an elitist who had presided over job losses while serving as a corporate executive, and that he had outsourced these jobs to Asia. Perdue in turn attacked Kingston as a Washington insider who had allowed the national debt to proliferate. Of particular note were the large amount of advertisements, run by both campaigns, that focused around comparing their opponent to a baby. The runoff was held on July 22, 2014, which Perdue won with 50.9% of the vote. Perdue's victory was attributed to strong support from business-friendly voters residing in the Atlanta suburbs.

==== Endorsements ====
Jack Kingston

Previously endorsed Handel

- Erick Erickson, radio host and blogger
- Sue Everhart, chairperson of the Georgia Republican Party
- Joshua McKoon, member of the Georgia Senate for the 29th district (2011-2019)
- Tom Price, U.S. representative from GA-06 (2005-2017)
- Concerned Women for America

Previously abstained

- Newt Gingrich, U.S. representative from GA-06 (1979-1999)
- Lynn Westmoreland, U.S. representative from GA-03 (2003-2005) & GA-03 (2007-2017)
- Rob Woodall, U.S. representative from GA-07 (2011-2021)
- NRA Political Victory Fund

Defeated candidates

- Phil Gingrey, U.S. representative from GA-11 (2003–2015)
- Karen Handel, secretary of state of Georgia (2007–2010)

==== Polling ====
Poll source	Date(s) administered	Sample size	Margin of error	Jack Kingston	David Perdue	Undecided
Public Policy Polling	May 21–22, 2014	410	± ?%	46%	34%	20%
McLaughlin & Associates*	May 27–29, 2014	500	± 4.5%	49%	35%	16%
SurveyUSA	June 3–5, 2014	419	± 4.9%	52%	41%	7%
InsiderAdvantage	June 10–11, 2014	401	± 4.89%	46.1%	35.1%	18.9%
Gravis Marketing	June 11–12, 2014	1,140	± 3%	49%	38%	14%
WPA Opinion Research^	June 22–24, 2014	600	± 4%	44%	45%	11%
InsiderAdvantage	July 7–9, 2014	1,278	± 2.7%	41.9%	41.1%	17%
InsiderAdvantage	July 15–16, 2014	696	± 3.7%	46%	41%	13%
Landmark Communications	July 16, 2014	1,720	± 2.4%	48%	41%	12%

- ^ Internal poll for David Perdue's campaign
- * Internal poll for Jack Kingston's campaign

==== Results ====
Runoff results by county: Perdue: 50–60%; 60–70%; 70–80%; Kingston: 50–60%; 60–70%; 70–80%; 80–90%; >90%; Perdue/Kingston tie: 50–60%

Republican primary runoff results
Party	Candidate	Votes	%
Republican	David Perdue	245,951	50.88%
Republican	Jack Kingston	237,448	49.12%
Total votes		483,399	100.00%

== Democratic primary ==
=== Campaign ===
With Democratic Congressman John Barrow passing on the race, Michelle Nunn, a businesswoman and the daughter of former U.S. senator Sam Nunn, consulted with the Democratic Senatorial Campaign Committee, as well as with Democratic Georgian political figures such as Shirley Franklin, Roy Barnes and Andrew Young about possibly running. Though she was little known to voters, Democrats embraced the hope that Nunn, with her executive experience as well as family name, could make their party once again competitive in-state.

On July 22, 2013, Nunn declared herself a candidate for U.S. Senate. She said: "Our opportunity is to define ourselves. I'm going to talk a lot about the deficit. Neither side of the equation is really tackling that. I think people are really tired of the mudslinging and the silliness of this." If elected, Nunn would have become the 29th Georgian elected to the U.S. Senate or U.S. House with a family member who previously served in Congress, and the first since her father (who is the grandnephew of Carl Vinson).

She raised $1.7 million in campaign funds during the third quarter of 2013, more than twice that of any Republican running. She followed that with a $1.6 million fourth quarter and a $2.4 million first quarter of 2014, again the most of anyone in the race.

On May 20, 2014, Nunn won the Democratic primary for the Senate seat with 75 percent of the vote, having skipped many of the debates and public forums where three other little-known candidates appeared.

=== Candidates ===
- Steen Miles, former state senator, candidate for lieutenant governor in 2006 and candidate for DeKalb County CEO in 2000 and 2008
- Michelle Nunn, CEO of Points of Light and daughter of former U.S. senator Sam Nunn
- Branko Radulovacki, physician
- Todd Robinson, Reserve Officers' Training Corps instructor and former U.S. Army Ranger

==== Withdrew ====
- Gerald Beckum, mayor of Oglethorpe (ran for secretary of state)

==== Declined ====
- Stacey Abrams, minority leader of the Georgia House of Representatives
- David I. Adelman, U.S. ambassador to Singapore and former state senator
- Peter Aman, former COO of Atlanta
- Thurbert Baker, former attorney general of Georgia and candidate for governor in 2010
- Roy Barnes, former governor
- John Barrow, U.S. representative from 12th Georgia District
- Sanford Bishop, U.S. representative
- Jason Carter, state senator and grandson of former president and former governor Jimmy Carter (ran for governor)
- Max Cleland, former U.S. senator
- Cathy Cox, president of Young Harris College, former secretary of state of Georgia and candidate for governor in 2006
- Shirley Franklin, former mayor of Atlanta
- Scott Holcomb, state representative (endorsed Nunn)
- Vernon Jones, former DeKalb County CEO and candidate for the U.S. Senate in 2008
- Jim Marshall, former U.S. representative
- Keith Mason, chief of staff to former governor Zell Miller
- Stephen Oppenheimer, businessman, task force coordinator for Clean Cities Atlanta and nominee for District 3 of the Georgia Public Service Commission in 2012
- DuBose Porter, former state representative and candidate for governor in 2010
- Kasim Reed, mayor of Atlanta
- Doug Stoner, former state senator
- Mark Taylor, former lieutenant governor of Georgia and nominee for governor in 2006
- Steve Thompson, state senator
- Michael Thurmond, interim superintendent of the DeKalb County School District, former Georgia labor commissioner and nominee for the U.S. Senate in 2010

=== Endorsements ===
Michelle Nunn

Executive officials

- Jimmy Carter, former president of the United States, former governor of Georgia
- Gordon Giffin, former U.S. ambassador to Canada

Federal officials

- Max Cleland, former U.S. senator (D-GA)
- John Lewis, U.S. representative (GA-05)
- Richard Lugar, former U.S. senator (R-IN)
- Claire McCaskill, U.S. senator (D-MO)
- Zell Miller, former U.S. senator (D-GA), former governor of Georgia
- Sam Nunn, former U.S. senator (D-GA); candidate's father
- John Warner, former U.S. senator (R-VA)

State officials

- Stacey Abrams, minority leader of the Georgia House of Representatives
- Roy Barnes, former governor of Georgia
- Jason Carter, state senator
- Scott Holcomb, state representative

Municipal officials

- Lisa Borders, former president of the Atlanta City Council, co-founder of No Labels, president of the Henry W. Grady Health System Foundation
- Shirley Franklin, former mayor of Atlanta
- Nan Orrock, state senator
- Kasim Reed, mayor of Atlanta
- Andrew Young, former mayor of Atlanta, former U.S. representative, former UN ambassador

Individuals

- Hank Aaron, former baseball player
- Arthur Blank, co-founder of The Home Depot, owner of the Atlanta Falcons
- Michelle Obama, First Lady of the United States

Organizations

- EMILY's List

=== Polling ===
Poll source	Date(s) administered	Sample size	Margin of error	Steen Miles	Michelle Nunn	Branko Radulovacki	Todd Robinson	Undecided
SurveyUSA	May 8–12, 2014	549	± 4.2%	7%	59%	5%	10%	19%
SurveyUSA	April 24–27, 2014	435	± 4.7%	13%	57%	5%	7%	18%
SurveyUSA	March 16–18, 2014	443	± 4.8%	11%	48%	5%	14%	23%

Hypothetical polling

Poll source	Date(s) administered	Sample size	Margin of error	Thurbert Baker	John Barrow	Sanford Bishop	Max Cleland	Cathy Cox	Other/ Undecided
Harper Polling	February 11–12, 2013	?	±?	8%	9%	11%	20%	13%	39%

=== Results ===
Democratic primary results
Party	Candidate	Votes	%
Democratic	Michelle Nunn	246,369	74.95%
Democratic	Steen Miles	39,418	11.99%
Democratic	Todd Robinson	31,822	9.68%
Democratic	Branko Radulovacki	11,101	3.38%
Total votes		328,710	100.00%

== Libertarian primary ==
=== Candidates ===
==== Declared ====
- Amanda Swafford, former Flowery Branch city councilwoman

== General election ==
=== Campaign ===
Following the conclusion of the two primaries, the race was set up as being between two self-described political "outsiders" with well-known-in-state political family names, each seeking to reach moderate and independent voters.

In July 2014, National Review, a conservative media outlet, reported on a leaked Nunn campaign memo from December 2013 which made frank recommendations on strategy for Nunn's path to victory in Georgia. The leaked memo said that likely attack lines against Nunn would include that she was a "lightweight", "too liberal", and "not a 'real' Georgian". The memo said that Nunn should feature images of her and her family in rural settings in order to connect with rural voters, and suggested that Nunn focus on African American clergy to raise enthusiasm for her candidacy among African American voters and that Nunn focus her efforts on Jews and Asians to raise money.

First Lady Michelle Obama campaigned on behalf of Nunn, as part of an effort to increase African-American voter turnout in midterm elections.

Nunn's stump speech emphasized an appeal to bipartisanship. She received support and donations from former Republican senators Richard Lugar and John Warner, both of whom were close to her father, and support from former Georgia Senator and Governor Zell Miller, a Democrat who had endorsed Republicans over the previous decade. Nunn's campaign commercials used photographs of herself and President George H. W. Bush, who founded Points of Light, together in campaign commercials and she mentioned him often on the campaign trail. However, in June 2014, Bush sent out a fundraising letter that, while not mentioning her by name, called on Republican donors to support the Republican nominee, and in September 2014, Bush endorsed Perdue. In October 2014, Bush emphatically objected to Nunn continuing to use a photograph of him in her campaign, saying that such actions were disrespectful. Points of Light chair Neil Bush neither endorsed nor opposed her candidacy, but did label as "shameful" an advertisement approved by Perdue that used a past episode to say that Points of Light "gave money to organizations linked to terrorists."

As the campaign moved on, Nunn made her father a focal point, staging joint appearances with him at military bases and saying that she would emulate his bipartisan approach to legislating. She has also said that she would seek a seat on the Senate Armed Services Committee that he once chaired.

Perdue stated that he entered politics out of concern for the rising national debt. He supported repeal and replacement of the Affordable Care Act. He also supported a constitutional balanced budget amendment and comprehensive tax reform. In addition, he pledged to limit himself to two terms in the Senate, if elected.

Perdue touted his business experience, particularly his experience at Dollar General, saying, "We added about 2,200 stores, created almost 20,000 jobs and doubled the value of that company in a very short period of time. Not because of me, but because we listened to our customers and employees." He received the endorsement of the National Federation of Independent Business. But he was hurt during the campaign by revelations that he had in the past been an enthusiastic supporter of outsourcing. Nunn targeted past pre-political statements of Perdue where he had said he was "proud of" his outsourcing efforts, and for the job losses that followed the final closure of Pillowtex.

=== Policy positions ===
Perdue supported repeal and replacement of the Affordable Care Act. He supported a constitutional balanced budget amendment and comprehensive tax reform. He pledged to limit himself to two terms in the Senate, if elected.

Nunn supported abortion rights. Nunn believed that members of Congress should be forced to pass a budget each year, or forfeit their pay. Nunn supported expanding federally mandated background checks to include all local sales to prevent mentally ill persons from buying firearms. Nunn said that going forward, some aspects of the Affordable Care Act should be fixed rather than the whole law being eliminated. She criticized Georgia's refusal to accept Medicaid expansion under the act. Following the start-up problems with the associated HealthCare.gov website, Nunn broke with the Obama administration and said that the individual mandate portion of the law should be delayed. Nunn supported the 2013 Senate immigration plan that would have allowed illegal immigrants to stay in the United States while waiting for American citizenship. Nunn favored construction of the Keystone XL Pipeline. She opposed the Obama administration's proposed cuts to defense spending. On the topic of same-sex marriage, Nunn said she personally favored it, but that the decision should be made on a state-by-state basis.

=== Debates ===
Perdue and Nunn held debates on August 21, October 7, October 26, and November 2.

- Complete video of debate, August 21, 2014
- Complete video of debate , October 7, 2014
- Complete video of debate, October 26, 2014
- Complete video of debate, November 2, 2014

=== Fundraising ===
David Perdue has funded more than $1.9 million of his campaign personally; the second-largest total of any Senate candidate. A total of $23,355,844 was raised by the candidates for this race, of which a total of $22,917,058 was spent by the campaigns.

Candidate	Contributions	Expenditures	Cash on hand	Debt
Michelle Nunn (D)	$13,035,397	$13,064,094	$1,105,870	$2,768
David Perdue (R)	$10,719,297	$11,069,317	$669,343	$150,000

=== Spending ===
This Senate race, as many others across the United States, was heavily influenced by outside PACs and organizations who supported various candidates. The U.S. Chamber of Commerce alone was expected to spend almost $50 million on elections in 2014. More than $4.6 million had been spent on advertising in the race by outside groups by May 2014.

Organization/candidate	Supporting	Amount	Media	Goal
United States Chamber of Commerce	Jack Kingston (R)	$920,000	TV and online ads	Support Jack Kingston (R)
Citizens for a Working America PAC	David Perdue (R)	$1,000,000	TV	Attack Jack Kingston (R)
Citizens for a Working America PAC	David Perdue (R)	$515,000	TV	Support David Perdue (R)
Ending Spending Action Fund	N/A	$1,750,000	TV	Attack Phil Gingrey (R)
Ending Spending Action Fund	N/A	$334,000	TV	Attack Michelle Nunn (D)
Nunn for Senate, Inc.	Michelle Nunn (D)	$55,000	TV	Support Michelle Nunn (D)

=== Predictions ===
Source	Ranking	As of
The Cook Political Report	Tossup	November 3, 2014
Sabato's Crystal Ball	Lean R	November 3, 2014
Rothenberg Political Report	Tossup	November 3, 2014
Real Clear Politics	Tossup	November 3, 2014

=== Polling ===
Poll source	Date(s) administered	Sample size	Margin of error	David Perdue (R)	Michelle Nunn (D)	Amanda Swafford (L)	Other	Undecided
Public Policy Polling	August 2–4, 2013	520	± 4.3%	40%	40%	—	—	21%
Landmark/Rosetta Stone	March 31, 2014	600	± 4%	37.5%	33%	—	—	29.5%
NBC News/Marist	April 30 – May 5, 2014	1,066	± 3%	45%	41%	—	1%	13%
Saint Leo	May 5–6, 2014	1,000	± 3%	41%	37%	—	6%	15%
Atlanta Journal-Constitution	May 5–8, 2014	1,012	± 4%	45%	46%	—	—	8%
Landmark/Rosetta Stone	May 2014	1,000	± 3%	44%	45%	—	—	11%
Public Policy Polling	May 21–22, 2014	803	± ?%	46%	48%	—	—	7%
Rasmussen Reports	May 21–22, 2014	750	± 4%	42%	45%	—	7%	6%
SurveyUSA	June 3–5, 2014	999	± 3.2%	43%	38%	6%	—	14%
Landmark Communications	July 16, 2014	750	± 4%	42%	48%	—	—	10%
CBS News/NYT/YouGov	July 5–24, 2014	2,541	± 3.4%	47%	42%	—	3%	8%
Rasmussen Reports	July 23–24, 2014	750	± 4%	46%	40%	—	4%	10%
Landmark Communications	July 25, 2014	750	± 3.8%	43%	46.6%	3.8%	—	6.6%
Vox Populi Polling	July 27–28, 2014	624	± 3.9%	49%	40%	1%	—	10%
Hicks Evaluation Group	August 8–10, 2014	788	± 3.48%	47.6%	41.5%	—	—	10.9%
InsiderAdvantage	August 12–13, 2014	719	± 3.7%	47%	40%	8%	—	5%
SurveyUSA	August 14–17, 2014	560	± 4.2%	50%	41%	3%	—	6%
Landmark Communications	August 20–21, 2014	600	± 4%	40%	47%	3%	—	10%
GaPundit.com	August 24–25, 2014	1,578	± 2.47%	43.09%	44.74%	7.41%	—	4.75%
CBS News/NYT/YouGov	August 18 – September 2, 2014	1,900	± 3%	47%	41%	3%	1%	9%
SurveyUSA	September 5–8, 2014	558	± 4.2%	47%	44%	5%	—	4%
Atlanta Journal-Constitution	September 8–11, 2014	884	± 4%	45%	41%	—	6%	8%
Landmark Communications	September 9–11, 2014	1,109	± 2.9%	43.4%	46%	6.4%	—	4.2%
Insider Advantage	September 10–11, 2014	1,167	± 2.9%	50.1%	39.8%	5%	—	5.1%
Rasmussen Reports	September 15–16, 2014	750	± 4%	46%	41%	—	4%	9%
SurveyUSA	September 19–22, 2014	550	± 4.3%	46%	45%	4%	—	6%
CBS News/NYT/YouGov	September 20 – October 1, 2014	1,851	± 3%	47%	43%	2%	0%	9%
Greenberg Quinlan Rosner	September 25 – October 1, 2014	1,000	± 2.09%	46%	41%	—	14%	
Insider Advantage	September 29 – October 1, 2014	947	± 3.2%	47%	42.6%	3.6%	—	6.8%
Rasmussen Reports	September 30 – October 1, 2014	1,000	± 3%	46%	42%	—	4%	9%
Hickman Analytics	September 26 – October 5, 2014	500	± 4.4%	41%	39%	6%	—	14%
Public Policy Polling	October 2–5, 2014	895	± 3.3%	45%	43%	5%	—	8%
Public Policy Polling	October 2–5, 2014	895	± 3.3%	48%	45%	—	—	6%
SurveyUSA	October 2–6, 2014	566	± 4.2%	46%	45%	3%	—	6%
Landmark Communications	October 7–9, 2014	1,000	± 3.1%	46%	46%	4%	—	4%
SurveyUSA	October 10–13, 2014	563	± 4.2%	45%	48%	3%	—	4%
GaPundit.com	October 13–14, 2014	1,543	± 2.49%	44.72%	45.69%	6.03%	—	3.56%
SurveyUSA	October 17–20, 2014	606	± 4.1%	44%	46%	4%	—	7%
Landmark Communications	October 20–21, 2014	1,000	± 2.75%	47.3%	47.4%	3.3%	—	2%
CNN/ORC International	October 19–22, 2014	565	± 4%	44%	47%	5%	—	4%
Insider Advantage	October 21–22, 2014	704	± 3.7%	44.9%	47.3%	4.1%	—	3.7%
Atlanta Journal-Constitution	October 16–23, 2014	1,170	± 3.6%	44%	42%	6%	—	8%
CBS News/NYT/YouGov	October 16–23, 2014	1,774	± 4%	47%	44%	1%	0%	8%
Public Policy Polling	October 23–24, 2014	771	± ?%	47%	47%	3%	—	4%
SurveyUSA	October 24–27, 2014	611	± 4%	48%	45%	3%	—	5%
Rasmussen Reports	October 25–27, 2014	977	± 3%	46%	46%	—	3%	5%
Monmouth	October 26–28, 2014	436	± 4.7%	49%	41%	3%	—	7%
Vox Populi Polling	October 28, 2014	602	± 4%	48%	43%	3%	—	6%
Landmark Communications	October 29, 2014	1,500	± 2.5%	47.4%	46.6%	2.7%	—	3.3%
NBC News/Marist	October 26–30, 2014	603 LV	± 4%	48%	44%	3%	1%	4%
NBC News/Marist	October 26–30, 2014	875 RV	± 3.3%	45%	43%	4%	1%	7%
YouGov	October 25–31, 2014	1,743	± 3.2%	44%	42%	1%	1%	12%
Public Policy Polling	October 30–31, 2014	533	± ?	46%	46%	4%	—	4%
Perkins	October 28 – November 2, 2014	?	?	48%	40%	3%	—	9%
SurveyUSA	October 30 – November 2, 2014	591	± 4.1%	47%	44%	5%	—	4%
Insider Advantage	November 2, 2014	1,463	± 3%	48%	45%	3%	—	4%
Landmark Communications	November 2, 2014	1,500	± 2.5%	49.8%	45.6%	2.4%	—	2.2%
Public Policy Polling	November 1–3, 2014	975	± 3.1%	46%	45%	5%	—	5%
Public Policy Polling	November 1–3, 2014	975	± 3.1%	48%	48%	—	—	5%

Hypothetical polling

With Broun

Poll source	Date(s) administered	Sample size	Margin of error	Paul Broun (R)	John Barrow (D)	Other	Undecided
Harper Polling	February 11–12, 2013	939	± 3.2%	17%	19%	—	64%
Public Policy Polling	February 15–18, 2013	602	± 4%	38%	38%	—	24%

Poll source	Date(s) administered	Sample size	Margin of error	Paul Broun (R)	Jason Carter (D)	Other	Undecided
Public Policy Polling	February 15–18, 2013	602	± 4%	42%	40%	—	18%

Poll source	Date(s) administered	Sample size	Margin of error	Paul Broun (R)	Max Cleland (D)	Other	Undecided
Harper Polling	February 11–12, 2013	939	± 3.2%	24%	40%	—	36%
Public Policy Polling	February 15–18, 2013	602	± 4%	40%	47%	—	13%

Poll source	Date(s) administered	Sample size	Margin of error	Paul Broun (R)	Michelle Nunn (D)	Other	Undecided
Public Policy Polling	August 2–4, 2013	520	± 4.3%	36%	41%	—	23%
Public Policy Polling	January 24–26, 2014	640	± ?%	41%	42%	—	17%
Public Policy Polling	March 5–6, 2014	580	± ?%	38%	38%	—	24%
Landmark/Rosetta Stone	March 31, 2014	600	± 4%	38.5%	38.2%	—	23.3%
NBC News/Marist	April 30 – May 5, 2014	1,131	± 2.9%	43%	42%	1%	14%
Saint Leo	May 5–6, 2014	1,000	± 3%	38%	42%	5%	15%
Atlanta Journal-Constitution	May 5–8, 2014	1,012	± 4%	38%	51%	—	11%
Landmark/Rosetta Stone	May 2014	1,000	± 3%	39%	47%	—	14%

With Chambliss

Poll source	Date(s) administered	Sample size	Margin of error	Saxby Chambliss (R)	Roy Barnes (D)	Other	Undecided
Public Policy Polling	November 30 – December 2, 2012	729	± 3.6%	48%	40%	—	13%

Poll source	Date(s) administered	Sample size	Margin of error	Saxby Chambliss (R)	John Barrow (D)	Other	Undecided
Public Policy Polling	November 30 – December 2, 2012	729	± 3.6%	50%	37%	—	13%

Poll source	Date(s) administered	Sample size	Margin of error	Saxby Chambliss (R)	Jason Carter (D)	Other	Undecided
Public Policy Polling	November 30 – December 2, 2012	729	± 3.6%	52%	34%	—	13%

Poll source	Date(s) administered	Sample size	Margin of error	Saxby Chambliss (R)	Max Cleland (D)	Other	Undecided
Public Policy Polling	November 30 – December 2, 2012	729	± 3.6%	45%	45%	—	10%

Poll source	Date(s) administered	Sample size	Margin of error	Saxby Chambliss (R)	Kasim Reed (D)	Other	Undecided
Public Policy Polling	November 30 – December 2, 2012	729	± 3.6%	52%	37%	—	11%

With Gingrey

Poll source	Date(s) administered	Sample size	Margin of error	Phil Gingrey (R)	John Barrow (D)	Other	Undecided
Public Policy Polling	February 15–18, 2013	602	± 4%	42%	43%	—	15%

Poll source	Date(s) administered	Sample size	Margin of error	Phil Gingrey (R)	Jason Carter (D)	Other	Undecided
Public Policy Polling	February 15–18, 2013	602	± 4%	43%	41%	—	16%

Poll source	Date(s) administered	Sample size	Margin of error	Phil Gingrey (R)	Max Cleland (D)	Other	Undecided
Public Policy Polling	February 15–18, 2013	602	± 4%	41%	46%	—	13%

Poll source	Date(s) administered	Sample size	Margin of error	Phil Gingrey (R)	Michelle Nunn (D)	Other	Undecided
Public Policy Polling	August 2–4, 2013	520	± 4.3%	41%	41%	—	18%
Public Policy Polling	January 24–26, 2014	640	± ?%	41%	45%	—	14%
Public Policy Polling	March 5–6, 2014	580	± ?%	40%	42%	—	18%
Landmark/Rosetta Stone	March 31, 2014	600	± 4%	40.5%	37.6%	—	21.9%
NBC News/Marist	April 30 – May 5, 2014	1,131	± 2.9%	42%	44%	1%	13%
Saint Leo	May 5–6, 2014	1,000	± 3%	36%	42%	7%	14%
Atlanta Journal-Constitution	May 5–8, 2014	1,012	± 4%	37%	52%	—	10%
Landmark/Rosetta Stone	May 2014	1,000	± 3%	39%	45%	—	16%

With Grayson

Poll source	Date(s) administered	Sample size	Margin of error	Derrick Grayson (R)	Michelle Nunn (D)	Other	Undecided
Public Policy Polling	August 2–4, 2013	520	± 4.3%	36%	42%	—	22%

With Handel

Poll source	Date(s) administered	Sample size	Margin of error	Karen Handel (R)	John Barrow (D)	Other	Undecided
Public Policy Polling	February 15–18, 2013	602	± 4%	42%	43%	—	15%

Poll source	Date(s) administered	Sample size	Margin of error	Karen Handel (R)	Jason Carter (D)	Other	Undecided
Public Policy Polling	February 15–18, 2013	602	± 4%	44%	40%	—	15%

Poll source	Date(s) administered	Sample size	Margin of error	Karen Handel (R)	Max Cleland (D)	Other	Undecided
Public Policy Polling	February 15–18, 2013	602	± 4%	40%	47%	—	12%

Poll source	Date(s) administered	Sample size	Margin of error	Karen Handel (R)	Michelle Nunn (D)	Other	Undecided
Public Policy Polling	August 2–4, 2013	520	± 4.3%	38%	40%	—	22%
Public Policy Polling	January 24–26, 2014	640	± ?%	40%	44%	—	16%
Public Policy Polling	March 5–6, 2014	580	± ?%	39%	43%	—	18%
Landmark/Rosetta Stone	March 31, 2014	600	± 4%	37%	38.1%	—	24.9%
NBC News/Marist	April 30 – May 5, 2014	1,066	± 3%	39%	42%	1%	18%
Saint Leo	May 5–6, 2014	1,000	± 3%	38%	39%	7%	15%
Atlanta Journal-Constitution	May 5–8, 2014	1,012	± 4%	41%	49%	—	10%
Landmark/Rosetta Stone	May 2014	1,000	± 3%	41%	47%	—	12%

With Kingston

Poll source	Date(s) administered	Sample size	Margin of error	Jack Kingston (R)	John Barrow (D)	Other	Undecided
Harper Polling	February 11–12, 2013	939	± 3.2%	19%	17%	—	64%
Public Policy Polling	February 15–18, 2013	602	± 4%	43%	40%	—	17%

Poll source	Date(s) administered	Sample size	Margin of error	Jack Kingston (R)	Jason Carter (D)	Other	Undecided
Public Policy Polling	February 15–18, 2013	602	± 4%	45%	39%	—	16%

Poll source	Date(s) administered	Sample size	Margin of error	Jack Kingston (R)	Max Cleland (D)	Other	Undecided
Harper Polling	February 11–12, 2013	939	± 3.2%	26%	39%	—	35%
Public Policy Polling	February 15–18, 2013	602	± 4%	43%	46%	—	11%

Poll source	Date(s) administered	Sample size	Margin of error	Jack Kingston (R)	Michelle Nunn (D)	Other	Undecided
Public Policy Polling	August 2–4, 2013	520	± 4.3%	38%	40%	—	21%
Public Policy Polling	January 24–26, 2014	640	± ?%	42%	44%	—	14%
Public Policy Polling	March 5–6, 2014	580	± ?%	41%	44%	—	15%
Landmark/Rosetta Stone	March 31, 2014	600	± 4%	37.7%	37%	—	25.3%
NBC News/Marist	April 30 – May 5, 2014	1,066	± 3%	43%	43%	1%	13%
Saint Leo	May 5–6, 2014	1,000	± 3%	38%	39%	7%	15%
Atlanta Journal-Constitution	May 5–8, 2014	1,012	± 4%	40%	50%	—	10%
Landmark/Rosetta Stone	May 2014	1,000	± 3%	44%	46%	—	10%
Public Policy Polling	May 21–22, 2014	803	± ?%	45%	45%	—	10%
Rasmussen Reports	May 21–22, 2014	750	± 4%	41%	47%	3%	9%
SurveyUSA	June 3–5, 2014	999	± 3.2%	43%	37%	6% (Note: Amanda Swafford (L))	13%
Landmark Communications	July 16, 2014	750	± 4%	41%	49%	—	10%

With Price

Poll source	Date(s) administered	Sample size	Margin of error	Tom Price (R)	Roy Barnes (D)	Other	Undecided
Public Policy Polling	November 30 – December 2, 2012	729	± 3.6%	40%	46%	—	13%

Poll source	Date(s) administered	Sample size	Margin of error	Tom Price (R)	John Barrow (D)	Other	Undecided
Public Policy Polling	November 30 – December 2, 2012	729	± 3.6%	40%	38%	—	21%
Harper Polling	February 11–12, 2013	939	± 3.2%	23%	18%	—	59%
Public Policy Polling	February 15–18, 2013	602	± 4%	43%	42%	—	15%

Poll source	Date(s) administered	Sample size	Margin of error	Tom Price (R)	Jason Carter (D)	Other	Undecided
Public Policy Polling	November 30 – December 2, 2012	729	± 3.6%	42%	36%	—	22%
Public Policy Polling	February 15–18, 2013	602	± 4%	44%	39%	—	16%

Poll source	Date(s) administered	Sample size	Margin of error	Tom Price (R)	Max Cleland (D)	Other	Undecided
Public Policy Polling	November 30 – December 2, 2012	729	± 3.6%	39%	47%	—	14%
Harper Polling	February 11–12, 2013	939	± 3.2%	27%	41%	—	32%
Public Policy Polling	February 15–18, 2013	602	± 4%	43%	44%	—	12%

Poll source	Date(s) administered	Sample size	Margin of error	Tom Price (R)	Kasim Reed (D)	Other	Undecided
Public Policy Polling	November 30 – December 2, 2012	729	± 3.6%	43%	38%	—	18%

With Yu

Poll source	Date(s) administered	Sample size	Margin of error	Eugene Yu (R)	Michelle Nunn (D)	Other	Undecided
Public Policy Polling	August 2–4, 2013	520	± 4.3%	35%	42%	—	24%

Hypothetical runoff polling

Poll source	Date(s) administered	Sample size	Margin of error	David Perdue (R)	Michelle Nunn (D)	Other	Undecided
CNN/ORC International	October 19–22, 2014	565	± 4%	47%	51%	—	2%
NBC News/Marist	October 26–30, 2014	603 LV	± 4%	49%	46%	1%	4%
NBC News/Marist	October 26–30, 2014	875 RV	± 3.3%	48%	45%	1%	6%

=== Results ===
United States Senate election in Georgia, 2014
Party	Candidate	Votes	%	±%
Republican	David Perdue	1,358,088	52.89%	−4.55%
Democratic	Michelle Nunn	1,160,811	45.21%	+2.65%
Libertarian	Amanda Swafford	48,862	1.90%	
Total votes		2,567,761	100.00%	N/A
Republican hold				

==== Counties that flipped from Republican to Democratic ====
- Douglas (largest town: Douglasville)
- Newton (largest town: Covington)
- Rockdale (largest town: Conyers)
- Dooly (largest city: Vienna)
- Henry (largest city: Stockbridge)

==== Counties that flipped from Democratic to Republican ====
- Chattahoochee (largest town: Cusseta)
- Early (largest city: Blakely)
- Quitman (largest city: Georgetown)
- Wilkinson (largest municipality: Gordon)

== See also ==
- 2014 United States Senate elections
- 2014 United States House of Representatives elections in Georgia
- 2014 Georgia gubernatorial election
- 2014 United States elections
