= Michelle Nunn =

American nonprofit executive (born 1966)

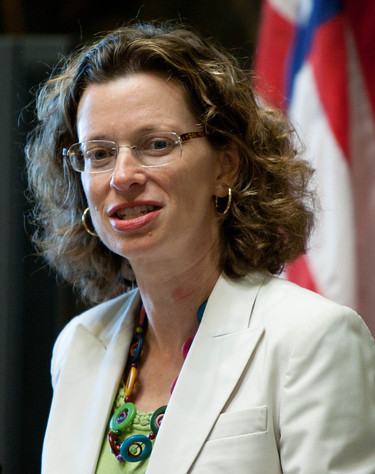
- Nunn in 2012

Personal details
- Born: Mary Michelle Nunn; November 16, 1966 (age 59) Macon, Georgia, U.S.
- Party: Democratic
- Spouse: Ron Martin Jr. (m. 2001)
- Children: 2
- Parent: Sam Nunn (father)
- Education: University of Virginia (BA); Harvard University (MPA)

Mary Michelle Nunn (born November 16, 1966) is an American philanthropic executive and politician. Since 2015 she has been president and CEO of CARE USA, the American national member of CARE International, the humanitarian aid and international development agency. She was CEO of Points of Light, an American nonprofit organization, from 2007 to 2013, and is a member of its board of directors as of 2015. She had been an executive for the volunteer service organization since 1990, previously running the predecessor and member organizations Hands On Atlanta, City Cares, and HandsOn Network. Nunn, a member of the Democratic Party, was her party's nominee in the race for Georgia's U.S. Senate seat in 2014. She is the daughter of former U.S. Senator Sam Nunn.

== Early life and early education ==
Michelle Nunn is the daughter of Sam Nunn, a lawyer, farmer, and politician, and Colleen Ann (née O'Brien) Nunn, who worked for the U.S. State Department, and then briefly for the Central Intelligence Agency under foreign service cover, before becoming a stay-at-home mother. She has a brother, Samuel Brian, known as Brian, two years younger. The family is Methodist. Two years after Michelle's birth, her father entered politics, being elected to the Georgia House of Representatives. He subsequently was elected to four terms as U.S. Senator from Georgia, serving from 1972 to 1997, and was chair of the Senate Armed Services Committee from 1987 to 1995.

Nunn was born in Macon, Georgia, and initially lived in nearby Perry, Georgia, where her grandfather had been mayor and where the family had a 2,400-acre (970 ha; 3.8 sq mi) farm. When she was six, the family moved to Bethesda, Maryland, and then lived in the Washington, D.C. area in conjunction with her father's election to national office. She credits her mother for having "really safeguarded a very normal and private environment for us." She began volunteering in junior high school. She went to the all-girls, private National Cathedral School in Washington, where she played on the basketball team and graduated in 1985. She credits the massive charity rock concert Live Aid in July 1985, including the performance of U2 at it, with inspiring a belief in her that collective action could help change the world and that "Seeing this activism prompted me to imagine how I could be a part of creating change."

She attended the University of Virginia, majoring in history with a minor in religious studies, and was a member of the Phi Beta Kappa honor society. She studied at the University of Oxford during 1987. She also studied for four months in India during 1989. She graduated from the University of Virginia in 1989.

== Hands On Atlanta, City Cares of America ==
After college, Nunn applied to join the Peace Corps and considered going to law school, but instead opted to join Hands On Atlanta. Founded in 1989 by twelve young professionals, Hands On Atlanta was a non-profit dedicated to engaging volunteers, especially young businesspeople who would sign up for single days of service on a monthly basis. Rapidly expanding and needing someone to help manage their efforts, they hired Nunn on a part-time basis as their executive director and only paid staffer (despite the title, she later described the position at first as "a glorified internship").

In May 1990, Nunn became full-time executive director, and by September 1990, Hands On Atlanta was coordinating 700 volunteers. Nunn later said, "I had a real passion for community service and volunteerism, so I had a real passion for the work." She also credited her upbringing, saying in 1992, "My father has influenced me through example. His own work in the public sphere, I'm sure, played a large part in my work in community service." Nunn was an early practitioner in garnering corporate backing for such ventures. Over the next twenty years, volunteers for Hands On Atlanta put in more than 6 million hours, and its founders credited Nunn with a significant role in helping it grow.

Similar organizations developed in other cities, and in 1992 they formed a national group under the name City Cares. By 1995, the concept of appealing to young working people had proven successful, and Hands On Atlanta had a budget of $1 million, a paid staff of 17, and over 11,000 volunteers on its mailing list, 7,500 of whom participated in a Hands On Atlanta Day. At the end of 1998, City Cares of America relocated its headquarters from New York to Atlanta, and Nunn became interim executive director for it, while continuing on as executive director of Hands on Atlanta. (She was sometimes referred to in the press without the 'interim' designation.) Subsequently, Nunn returned to focusing on Hands On Atlanta, and staged a successful, multimillion-dollar capital campaign for a new headquarters building in that city.

== Further education, marriage and family, potential 2004 U.S. Senate run ==
Nunn was a Kellogg National Fellow in the KNFP-15 group, c. 1995–1998. She earned a Master of Public Administration degree from Harvard University's John F. Kennedy School of Government in 2001.

At a beach ceremony on Cumberland Island in Georgia on June 2, 2001, Nunn married Ron Martin Jr., who works in the real estate business. She kept her own name after marriage; she later said that she was established professionally under that name and that "it really, frankly, didn't occur to me to change my name." The couple live in the Inman Park neighborhood of Atlanta with their two children. Martin is a stay-at-home father. The family attends church in Atlanta and the children are being raised in the Methodist faith.

Nunn considered a run in the 2004 U.S. Senate election in Georgia, when Democratic incumbent Zell Miller decided to retire. She was assessed at the time by Emory University political scientist Merle Black as having few political assets other than her father's name. In October 2003, she decided not to become a candidate, saying, "In the next few years, I believe that my primary focus is best directed toward my 11-month-old son and family." The election was won by Republican Johnny Isakson.

== HandsOn Network, Points of Light ==
In late 2003, Nunn left Hands On Atlanta to become president of City Cares. In 2004, City Cares renamed itself to the HandsOn Network. Under Nunn's leadership, the City Cares model changed somewhat, and a majority of new HandsOn Network affiliates were themselves volunteer centers.

In 2006, Nunn was named to the President's Council on Service and Civic Participation. Later in 2006, she was the editor of Be The Change! Change the World. Change Yourself., a collection of stories from hundreds of volunteers. It contained forewords from George H.W. Bush and Tom Brokaw and was republished in 2012.

In 2007, the Points of Light Foundation began talks with the HandsOn Network to join forces through a merger to create one national organization with local affiliates focused on volunteering and service. They formally combined forces on August 11, 2007, to become the Points of Light and Hands On Network (later Points of Light Institute and later still just Points of Light). Nunn presided over the merger, saying of its motivation, "We both could have continued along the route we were on, growing incrementally, but I believe neither of us would have achieved the kind of exponential change we wanted." She also ensured that the combined operation had its main offices in Atlanta. During the three years following the merger, the staff dropped from 175 to 80 employees, due partly to eliminating duplicate positions and partly to the organization having lost its previous $10 million congressional earmark. During this time, Nunn's compensation grew from $120,000 to $250,000, which she later said was still less than that of her predecessor's $325,000. The layoffs and her pay would become issues during her 2014 Senate campaign.

As CEO of Points of Light, Nunn formed good relations with the Bush family, as the Points of Light Foundation had derived from President George H. W. Bush and his "thousand points of light" philosophy. Nunn's trip to Texas to meet with George H. W. Bush had been a key element in forming the merger. Neil Bush, the chair of Points of Light, characterized Nunn as "a fabulous leader". Points of Light became the largest organization in the U.S. purposed towards volunteer service. By 2009, it had a budget of $39 million and its associated HandsOn Network affiliates had a collective budget of $180 million. In 2011, Points of Light had revenues of $55 million and had over 4 million volunteers mobilized under it. Nunn's salary was over $300,000.

One of Points of Light's activities was to validate charities for MissionFish, the charity arm of eBay. One of those validated organizations was Islamic Relief USA, which received $13,500 from individual donors on eBay. This became an issue during Nunn's 2014 Senate campaign, as the umbrella organization Islamic Relief Worldwide has been accused of having ties to Hamas but has denied any such links. Islamic Relief USA itself is an IRS-approved charity and not on any terrorist watch list.

== 2014 U.S. Senate run ==
When Republican Senator Saxby Chambliss from Georgia announced in January 2013 that he would retire after two terms, his seat—which had once been held by her father—became open. Though she was little known to voters, Democrats embraced the hope that Nunn, with her executive experience as well as family name, could make their party once again competitive in-state. Democrats also hoped the demographics of the state were moving in their favor.

On July 22, 2013, Nunn declared herself a candidate for U.S. Senate. (She was granted a leave of absence from her position with Points of Light.) She said: "Our opportunity is to define ourselves.... I think people are really tired of the mudslinging and the silliness [contemporary politics]." Commenting on her public image, The New York Times said, "At 47, the cautious and cerebral Ms. Nunn is every bit her father's daughter, down to her owlish glasses and centrist message about curing dysfunction in Washington." She raised more funds during the balance of 2013 and into 2014 than any Republican in the race. The contest garnered national interest since Democratic control of the Senate might depend upon it.

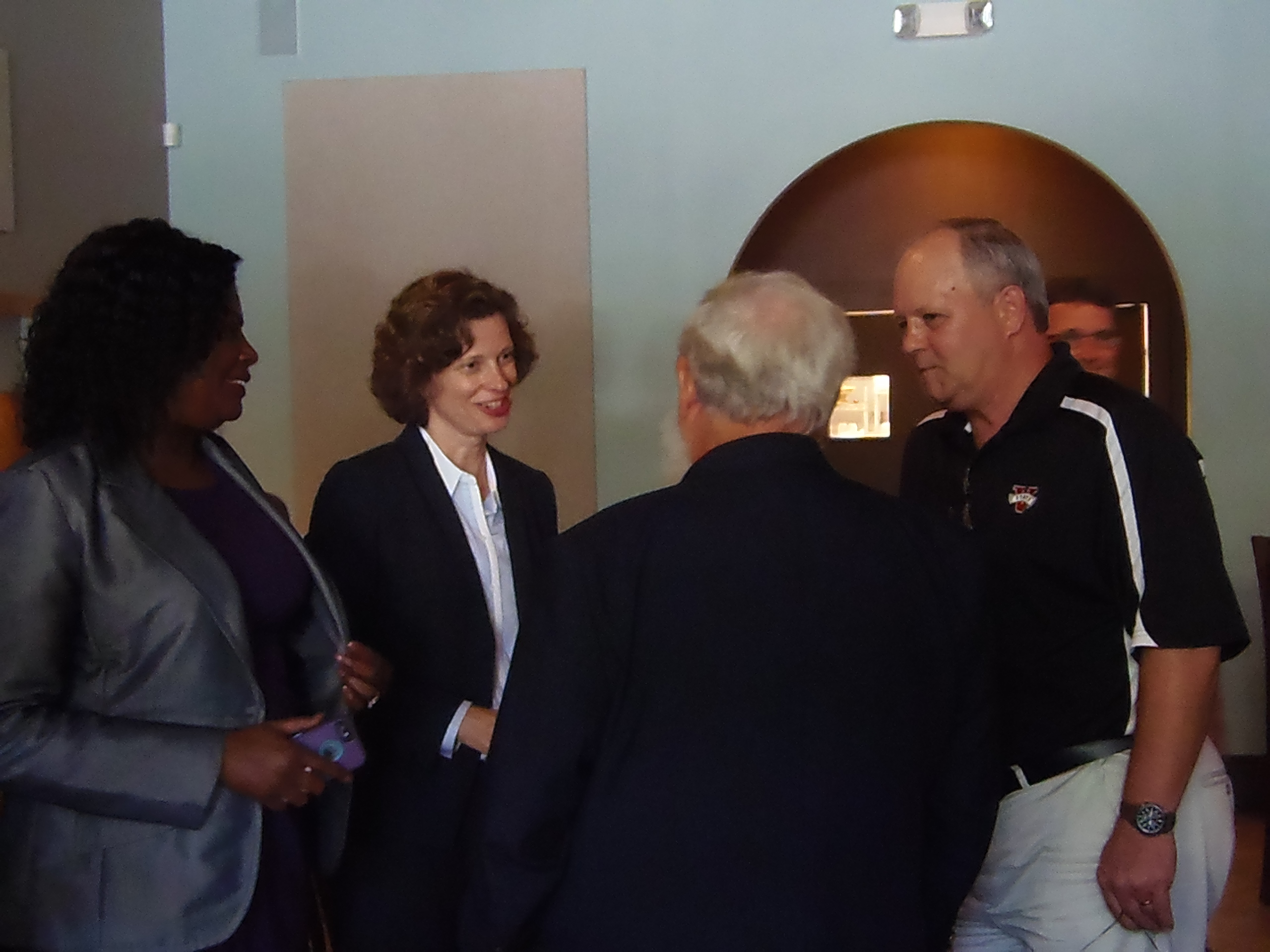
Nunn campaigning in Valdosta, Georgia in August 2013

On May 20, 2014, Nunn won the Democratic primary for the Senate seat with 75 percent of the vote. The Republican primary resulted in a July 22 runoff contest won by businessman David Perdue, a cousin of former Georgia governor Sonny Perdue. This set up a race between two self-described political "outsiders" with well-known-in-state political family names, each seeking to reach moderate and independent voters. Polls throughout the race indicated that it was close.

Nunn's campaign was hurt by a leaked campaign memo from December 2013 which made frank recommendations on strategy for Nunn's path to victory in Georgia. It said that likely attack lines against Nunn would include that she was "too liberal" and "not a 'real' Georgian" and that she should make appeals to specific groups for support and funds, including Jews, Asian Americans, and members of the LGBTQ community. In turn, Perdue was hurt during the campaign by revelations that he had in the past been an enthusiastic supporter of outsourcing.

Nunn's policy positions during the campaign emphasized her attempt to portray a moderate image and distance herself from the unpopular Obama administration. She declined to say whether she would have voted for the Patient Protection and Affordable Care Act had she been in the Senate but said that going forward, some aspects of it should be fixed rather than the whole law being eliminated. She criticized Georgia's refusal to accept Medicaid expansion under the act. Following the start-up problems with the associated HealthCare.gov website, Nunn broke with the Obama administration and said that the individual mandate portion of the law should be delayed. Nunn favored construction of the Keystone XL Pipeline and opposed the Obama administration's proposed cuts to defense spending. On the topic of same-sex marriage, Nunn said she personally favored it, but that the decision should be made on a state-by-state basis. Nunn was endorsed by EMILY's List, a political action committee that assists pro-choice Democratic women with their campaigns.

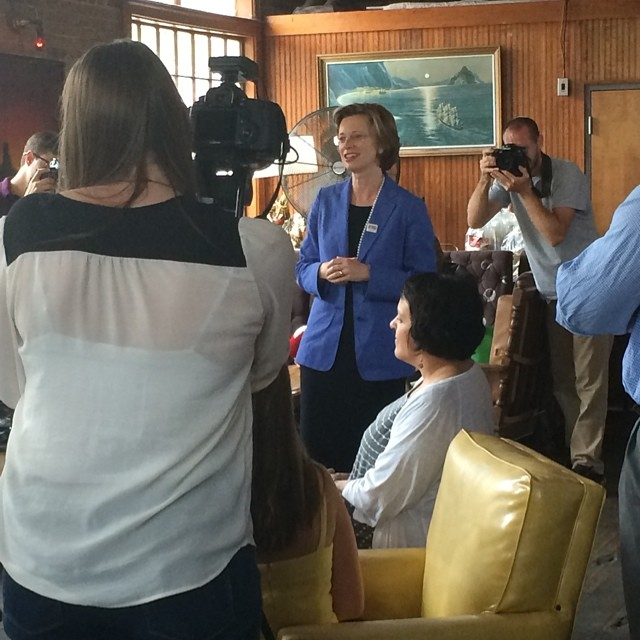
Nunn campaigning in Athens, Georgia in July 2014

Nunn's stump speech emphasized an appeal to bipartisanship. She proposed that members of Congress should be forced to pass a budget each year or forfeit their pay, said there was blame on both sides for ongoing Congressional dysfunction, and declined to say whether she would support Harry Reid remaining as Senate Majority Leader. Nunn made her father a focal point, staging joint appearances with him at military bases and saying that she would emulate his bipartisan approach to legislating. She received support and donations from former Republican Senators Richard Lugar and John Warner, both of whom were close to her father, and support from former Georgia Senator and Governor Zell Miller, a Democrat who had endorsed Republicans over the previous decade. However, the use by Nunn's campaign commercials of photographs of her with George H. W. Bush drew a series of objections from the former president, who endorsed Perdue. Neil Bush neither endorsed nor opposed her candidacy, but did object to some of Perdue's negative ads based upon her time with Points of Light. In all, Nunn raised $14 million during the campaign.

In the November 4, 2014 general election, Nunn lost to Perdue by a 53–45 margin. The loss was part of a wave of Republican victories across the nation. Nunn failed to improve on Obama's losing percentages in the state from two years earlier and any changes in the state's demographics were not enough. Nevertheless, Nunn took credit for making the party competitive in the otherwise inhospitable South: "We put Georgia in play. We have reminded people what a two-party system looks like."

Her performance in the campaign impressed political observers enough that they felt Nunn could try for another run at elective office in the state if she desired to do so. Following the election, she returned to Points of Light in early 2015 as a member of its board of directors but not as its CEO.

== CARE USA ==
In April 2015, CARE USA, the American national member of CARE International, a major international humanitarian aid agency delivering emergency relief and engaging in long-term international development projects, announced that Nunn would join the organization as its new president and CEO, effective July 1. Nunn was named to replace Helene D. Gayle, who had announced she was stepping down after nearly a decade of service at the organization. The position would allow Nunn to remain in Atlanta, where CARE USA had some 200 employees. The 70-year-old CARE faced challenges due to the aging of its donor base, reduced U.S. government funding, and the effects of the Great Recession.

With CARE, Nunn has sought to leverage the skills and concerns of women leaders in the Atlanta area – which besides CARE is also home to the Centers for Disease Control and Prevention, the Carter Center, MAP International, MedShare, the Task Force for Global Health, and Habitat for Humanity International – to produce a "greater global constellation" that would look at the requirements of women and children around the world who were in situations of extreme. Nunn has also focused on the response to the Syrian refugee crisis, traveling to the Azraq refugee camp in Jordan as well as to sites in Turkey, and saying upon her return, "We are going to have a continued European migration crisis if we don't support people to rebuild their lives and create some hope in the places where they are living." At CARE's 2018 national conference, Nunn was one of several speakers who sought to link the organization's purpose to the worldwide Me Too movement. Nunn also expressed concern over isolationist tendencies in American foreign policy: "For more than 70 years, the United States has led efforts to promote peace, prosperity, and share values to foster global stability. But recently that legacy has been under threat."

In 2018, Nunn became a member of the Inter-American Dialogue, a U.S.-based think tank that seeks to foster better governments, prosperity, and social equity in Central and South America. During the United States elections, 2020, Nunn, along with Georgian Republican Party figure Eric Tanenblatt, were co-chairs of Georgia Support the Vote, a nonpartisan effort to gain support from the statewide business community toward make voting easier and safer during the COVID-19 pandemic in Georgia. By 2021, Nunn and CARE USA were heavily involved in trying to facilitate deployment of COVID-19 vaccines in low-income countries and constructing temporary medical facilities to address a devastating wave of the COVID-19 pandemic in India.

== Awards and honors ==
Nunn was chosen in 2006 as one of the 100 most influential Georgians by Georgia Trend. In 2010, she received a Global Ambassador of Youth Award from the World Leadership Awards for her work with volunteer organizations. In 2012, Nunn was named for the sixth straight time to The NonProfit Times' annual Power & Influence Top 50 list of the most influential nonprofit executives.

Nunn, along with her father, received an honorary Doctor of Humane Letters from Oglethorpe University in 2006. In 2010, she received an honorary Doctor of Public Service from Wesleyan College.

In 2022 Nunn was the recipient of the Academy of International Business (AIB) International Executive of the Year Award.

Party political offices
Preceded by Jim Martin	Democratic nominee for U.S. Senator from Georgia (Class 2); 2014	Succeeded by Jon Ossoff
