= 2014 United States House of Representatives elections in Georgia =

- November 4, 2014

All 14 Georgia seats to the United States House of Representatives
- Turnout: 44.60%
	Majority party	Minority party
Party	Republican	Democratic
Last election	9	5
Seats won	10	4
Seat change	▲1	▼1
Popular vote	1,349,076	956,361
Percentage	58.52%	41.48%
Swing	▼0.68%	▲0.68%

Republican hold Republican gain
Democratic hold
Republican
50–60%
60–70%
70–80%
80–90%
90–100%
Democratic
50–60%
60–70%
70–80%
80–90%
90–100%

The 2014 United States House of Representatives elections in Georgia were held on Tuesday, November 4, 2014, to elect the 14 U.S. representatives from the state of Georgia, one from each of the state's 14 congressional districts. The elections coincided with the elections of other federal and state offices, including Governor of Georgia and U.S. Senator.

== Overview ==
United States House of Representatives elections in Georgia, 2014
Party	Votes	Percentage	Seats Before	Seats After	+/–
Republican	1,349,076	58.5%	9	10	+1
Democratic	956,361	41.5%	5	4	-1
Others	228	0.0%	0	0	-
Totals	2,305,665	100.00%	14	14	±0

=== By district ===
Results of the 2014 United States House of Representatives elections in Georgia by district:

District	Republican		Democratic		Others		Total		Result
District	Votes	%	Votes	%	Votes	%	Votes	%	Result
District 1	95,337	60.91%	61,175	39.09%	0	0.00%	156,512	100.00%	Republican hold
District 2	66,537	40.85%	96,363	59.15%	0	0.00%	162,900	100.00%	Democratic hold
District 3	156,277	100.00%	0	0.00%	0	0.00%	156,277	100.00%	Republican hold
District 4	0	0.00%	161,211	99.93%	109	0.07%	161,320	100.00%	Democratic hold
District 5	0	0.00%	170,326	100.00%	0	0.00%	170,326	100.00%	Democratic hold
District 6	139,018	66.04%	71,486	33.96%	0	0.00%	210,504	100.00%	Republican hold
District 7	113,557	65.39%	60,112	34.61%	0	0.00%	173,669	100.00%	Republican hold
District 8	129,938	99.91%	0	0.00%	119	0.09%	130,057	100.00%	Republican hold
District 9	146,059	80.67%	34,988	19.33%	0	0.00%	181,047	100.00%	Republican hold
District 10	130,703	66.52%	65,777	33.48%	0	0.00%	196,480	100.00%	Republican hold
District 11	161,532	100.00%	0	0.00%	0	0.00%	161,532	100.00%	Republican hold
District 12	91,336	54.75%	75,478	45.25%	0	0.00%	166,814	100.00%	Republican gain
District 13	0	0.00%	159,445	100.00%	0	0.00%	159,445	100.00%	Democratic hold
District 14	118,782	100.00%	0	0.00%	0	0.00%	118,782	100.00%	Republican hold
Total	1,349,076	58.51%	956,361	41.48%	228	0.01%	2,305,665	100.00%	

== District 1 ==
2014 Georgia's 1st congressional district election
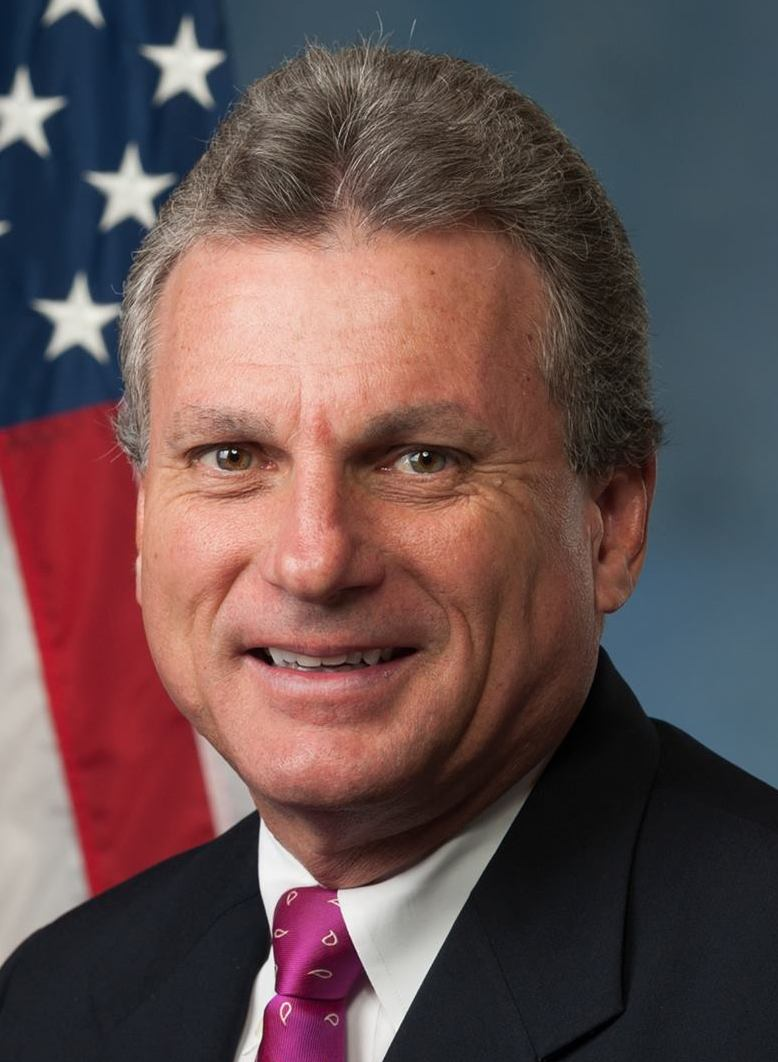

Nominee	Buddy Carter	Brian Reese
Party	Republican	Democratic
Popular vote	95,337	61,175
Percentage	60.9%	39.1%
- County results Carter: 50–60% 60–70% 70–80% 80–90% Reese: 50–60%
U.S. Representative before election
Jack Kingston
Republican
Elected U.S. Representative
Buddy Carter
Republican

Incumbent Republican representative Jack Kingston did not run for re-election, instead running unsuccessfully for the U.S. Senate seat held by retiring Republican Saxby Chambliss.

=== Republican primary ===
==== Candidates ====
===== Nominee =====
- Buddy Carter, state senator

===== Eliminated in primary =====
- Darwin Carter, former USDA official
- Jeff Chapman, state representative
- Bob Johnson, surgeon
- Earl Martin, physician
- John McCallum, venture capitalist

===== Withdrawn =====
- Stefan Jarvis, realtor
- David Schwarz, former congressional aide

===== Declined =====
- Jack Kingston, incumbent U.S. Representative

==== Polling ====
Poll source	Date(s) administered	Sample size	Margin of error	Buddy Carter	Darwin Carter	Jeff Chapman	Bob Johnson	John McCallum	Undecided
Rosetta Stone	February 4, 2014	450	± 3.5%	27%	2%	14%	2%	4%	51%

==== Endorsements ====
Bob Johnson

Organizations

- Club for Growth

==== Primary results ====
Results by county: Carter: 30–40%; 40–50%; 50–60%; Johnson: 20–30%; McCallum: 20–30%; 30–40%; Chapman: 30–40%; Carter: 30–40%

Republican primary results
Party	Candidate	Votes	%
Republican	Buddy Carter	18,971	36.2
Republican	Bob Johnson	11,890	22.7
Republican	John McCallum	10,715	20.5
Republican	Jeff Chapman	6,918	13.2
Republican	Darwin Carter	2,819	5.4
Republican	Earl Martin	1,063	2.0
Total votes		52,376	100.0

Results by county: Carter: 50–60%; 60–70%; 70–80%; Johnson: 50–60%; 60–70%

==== Runoff ====
Republican primary runoff results
Party	Candidate	Votes	%
Republican	Buddy Carter	22,871	53.8
Republican	Bob Johnson	19,632	46.2
Total votes		42,503	100.0

=== Democratic primary ===
==== Candidates ====
===== Nominee =====
- Brian Reese, UPS manager and minister

===== Eliminated in primary =====
- Marc Smith, navy veteran
- Amy Tavio, realtor

===== Withdrawn =====
- Lesli Messinger, businesswoman

==== Primary results ====
Democratic primary results
Party	Candidate	Votes	%
Democratic	Amy Tavio	6,148	34.0
Democratic	Brian Reese	6,122	33.8
Democratic	Marc Smith	5,836	32.2
Total votes		18,106	100.0

==== Runoff ====
Democratic primary runoff results
Party	Candidate	Votes	%
Democratic	Brian Reese	6,531	63.1
Democratic	Amy Tavio	3,821	36.9
Total votes		10,352	100.0

=== General election ===
==== Endorsements ====
Buddy Carter (R)

Organizations

- BIPAC
- National Rifle Association - Political Victory Fund
- National Right to Life Committee

==== Polling ====
Poll source	Date(s) administered	Sample size	Margin of error	Buddy Carter (R)	Brian Reese (D)	Undecided
New York Times/CBS News Battleground Tracker	October 16–23, 2014	128	± 11%	56%	38%	6%

==== Predictions ====
Source	Ranking	As of
The Cook Political Report	Safe R	November 3, 2014
Rothenberg	Safe R	October 24, 2014
Sabato's Crystal Ball	Safe R	October 30, 2014
RCP	Safe R	November 2, 2014
Daily Kos Elections	Safe R	November 4, 2014

==== Results ====
Georgia's 1st congressional district, 2014
Party	Candidate	Votes	%
Republican	Buddy Carter	95,337	60.9
Democratic	Brian Reese	61,175	39.1
Total votes		156,512	100.0
Republican hold			

== District 2 ==
2014 Georgia's 2nd congressional district election
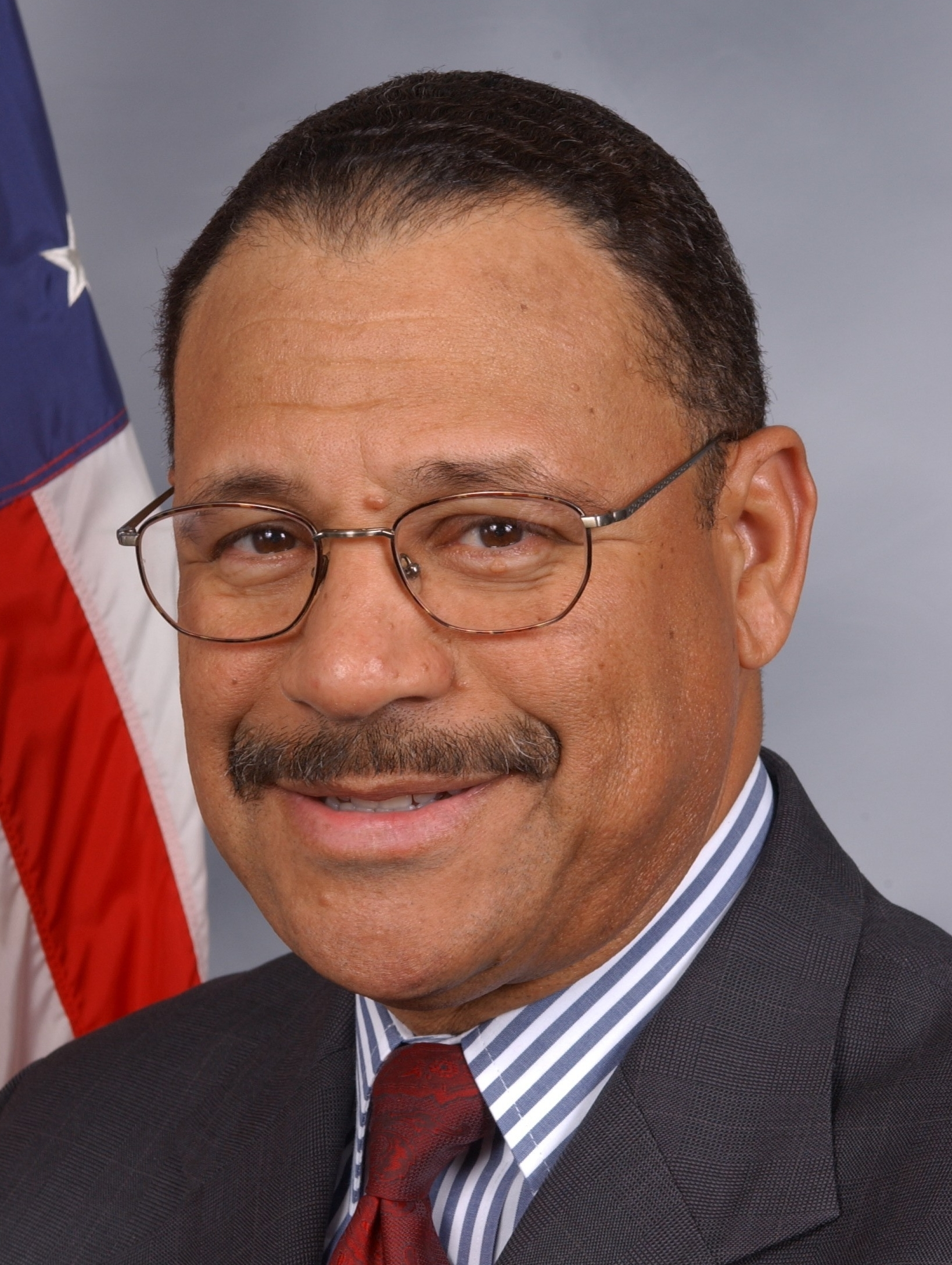

Nominee	Sanford Bishop	Greg Duke
Party	Democratic	Republican
Popular vote	96,363	66,537
Percentage	59.2%	40.8%
- County results Bishop: 50–60% 60–70% 70–80% Duke: 50–60% 60–70% 70–80%
U.S. Representative before election
Sanford Bishop
Democratic
Elected U.S. Representative
Sanford Bishop
Democratic

Incumbent Democratic representative Sanford Bishop has represented southwest Georgia since 1993.

=== Democratic primary ===
==== Candidates ====
===== Nominee =====
- Sanford Bishop, incumbent U.S. Representative

=== Republican primary ===
==== Candidates ====
===== Nominee =====
- Greg Duke, optician and former Lee County School Board member

===== Eliminated in primary =====
- Vivian Childs, retired educator

===== Declined =====
- John House, business consultant, Army veteran and nominee for this seat in 2012

==== Primary results ====
Republican primary results
Party	Candidate	Votes	%
Republican	Greg Duke	16,468	69.4
Republican	Vivian Childs	7,252	30.6
Total votes		23,720	100.0

=== General election ===
==== Endorsements ====
Sanford Bishop (D)

Labor unions

- AFL-CIO
- National Association of Letter Carriers

Organizations

- Blue Dog Coalition
- National Rifle Association - Political Victory Fund
- No Labels

==== Predictions ====
Source	Ranking	As of
The Cook Political Report	Safe D	November 3, 2014
Rothenberg	Safe D	October 24, 2014
Sabato's Crystal Ball	Safe D	October 30, 2014
RCP	Safe D	November 2, 2014
Daily Kos Elections	Safe D	November 4, 2014

==== Results ====
Georgia's 2nd congressional district, 2014
Party	Candidate	Votes	%
Democratic	Sanford Bishop (incumbent)	96,363	59.2
Republican	Greg Duke	66,537	40.8
Total votes		162,900	100.0
Democratic hold			

== District 3 ==
2014 Georgia's 3rd congressional district election
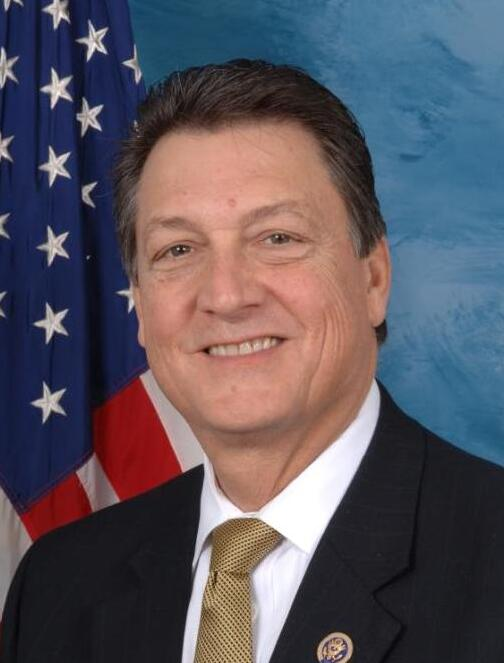
Nominee	Lynn Westmoreland
Party	Republican
Popular vote	156,277
Percentage	100.0%
- County results Westmoreland: 100%
U.S. Representative before election
Lynn Westmoreland
Republican
Elected U.S. Representative
Lynn Westmoreland
Republican

Incumbent Republican representative Lynn Westmoreland, who has represented West-Central Georgia since 2005, was mentioned as a candidate for the U.S. Senate, but he declined to run. He was opposed in the Republican primary by businessman Chip Flanegan, but prevailed and was unopposed in the general election.

=== Republican primary ===
==== Candidates ====
===== Nominee =====
- Lynn Westmoreland, incumbent U.S. Representative

===== Eliminated in primary =====
- Chip Flanegan, businessman

==== Primary results ====
Republican primary results
Party	Candidate	Votes	%
Republican	Lynn Westmoreland (incumbent)	37,106	69.5
Republican	Chip Flanegan	16,294	30.5
Total votes		53,400	100.0

=== General election ===
==== Endorsements ====
Lynn Westmoreland (R)

Organizations

- National Federation of Independent Business
- National Rifle Association - Political Victory Fund
- National Right to Life Committee

==== Predictions ====
Source	Ranking	As of
The Cook Political Report	Safe R	November 3, 2014
Rothenberg	Safe R	October 24, 2014
Sabato's Crystal Ball	Safe R	October 30, 2014
RCP	Safe R	November 2, 2014
Daily Kos Elections	Safe R	November 4, 2014

==== Results ====
Georgia's 3rd congressional district, 2014
Party	Candidate	Votes	%
Republican	Lynn Westmoreland (incumbent)	156,277	100.0
Total votes		156,277	100.0
Republican hold			

== District 4 ==
2014 Georgia's 4th congressional district election
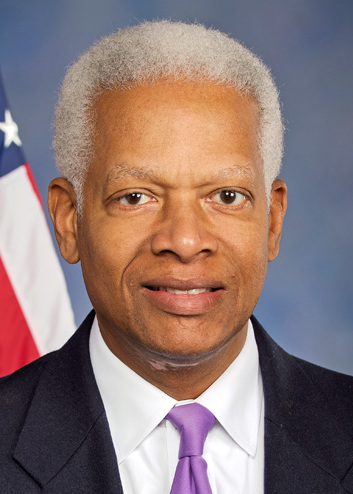
Nominee	Hank Johnson
Party	Democratic
Popular vote	161,211
Percentage	100.0%
- County results Johnson: >90%
U.S. Representative before election
Hank Johnson
Democratic
Elected U.S. Representative
Hank Johnson
Democratic

Incumbent Democratic representative Hank Johnson has represented the DeKalb County-based district since 2007. He was opposed for renomination in the Democratic primary by DeKalb County Sheriff Tom Brown. Despite Brown raising the adequate funds to run a credible challenge to the incumbent, Johnson won with 55% to Brown's 45%.

=== Democratic primary ===
==== Candidates ====
===== Nominee =====
- Hank Johnson, incumbent U.S. Representative

===== Eliminated in primary =====
- Tom Brown, DeKalb County Sheriff

==== Primary results ====
Democratic primary results
Party	Candidate	Votes	%
Democratic	Hank Johnson (incumbent)	26,514	54.7
Democratic	Tom Brown	21,909	45.3
Total votes		48,423	100.0

=== General election ===
==== Endorsements ====
Hank Johnson (D)

Labor unions

- AFL-CIO
- National Association of Letter Carriers

Organizations

- Human Rights Campaign
- Sierra Club

==== Predictions ====
Source	Ranking	As of
The Cook Political Report	Safe D	November 3, 2014
Rothenberg	Safe D	October 24, 2014
Sabato's Crystal Ball	Safe D	October 30, 2014
RCP	Safe D	November 2, 2014
Daily Kos Elections	Safe D	November 4, 2014

==== Results ====
Georgia's 4th congressional district, 2014
Party	Candidate	Votes	%
Democratic	Hank Johnson (incumbent)	161,211	100.0
Total votes		161,211	100.0
Democratic hold			

== District 5 ==
2014 Georgia's 5th congressional district election
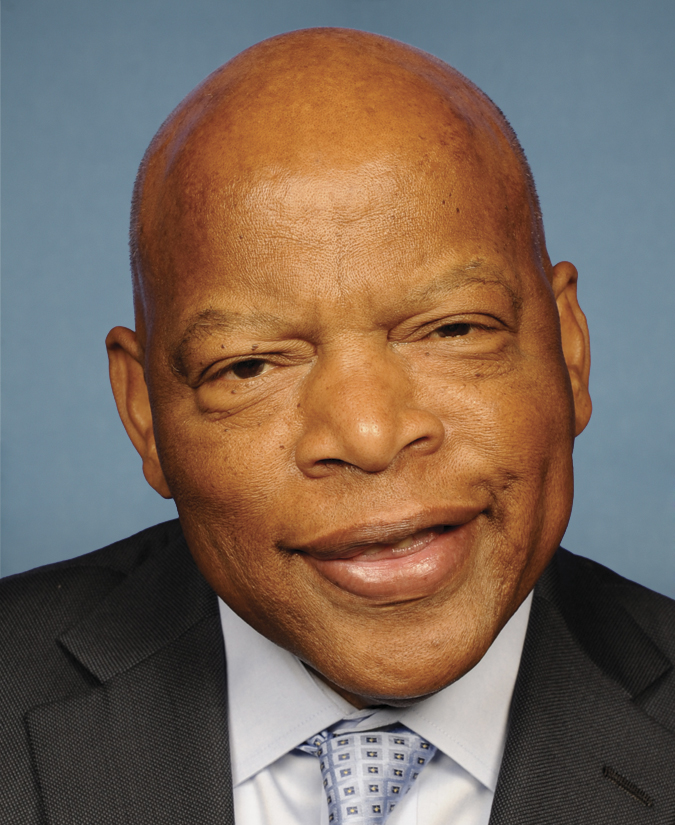
Nominee	John Lewis
Party	Democratic
Popular vote	275,406
Percentage	100%
- County results Lewis: >90%
U.S. Representative before election
John Lewis
Democratic
Elected U.S. Representative
John Lewis
Democratic

Incumbent Democratic representative John Lewis has represented the Atlanta-based district since 1987. He was unopposed in the primary election as well as in the general election.

=== Democratic primary ===
==== Candidates ====
===== Nominee =====
- John Lewis, incumbent U.S. Representative

==== Primary results ====
Democratic primary results
Party	Candidate	Votes	%
Democratic	John Lewis (incumbent)	48,001	100.0

=== General election ===
==== Endorsements ====
Hank Johnson (D)

Labor unions

- AFL-CIO
- National Association of Letter Carriers

Organizations

- Human Rights Campaign
- Sierra Club

==== Predictions ====
Source	Ranking	As of
The Cook Political Report	Safe D	November 3, 2014
Rothenberg	Safe D	October 24, 2014
Sabato's Crystal Ball	Safe D	October 30, 2014
RCP	Safe D	November 2, 2014
Daily Kos Elections	Safe D	November 4, 2014

==== Results ====
Georgia's 5th congressional district, 2014
Party	Candidate	Votes	%
Democratic	John Lewis (incumbent)	170,326	100.0
Total votes		170,326	100.0
Democratic hold			

== District 6 ==
2014 Georgia's 6th congressional district election
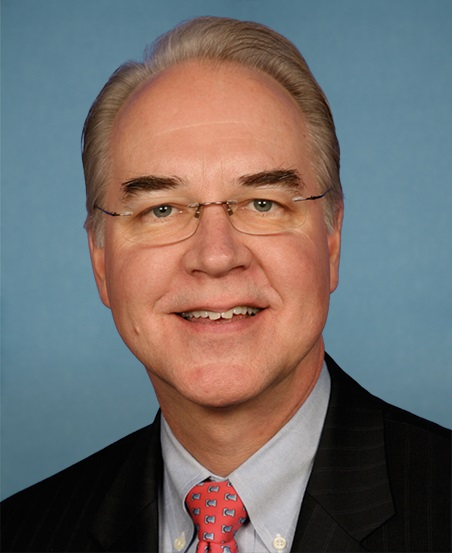

Nominee	Tom Price	Robert Montigel
Party	Republican	Democratic
Popular vote	139,018	71,486
Percentage	66.0%	34.0%
- County results Price: 50–60% 60–70% 70–80%
U.S. Representative before election
Tom Price
Republican
Elected U.S. Representative
Tom Price
Republican

Incumbent Republican representative Tom Price was a potential candidate for U.S. Senate, but ultimately declined to enter the race. Businessman and army veteran Bob Montigel was the Democratic candidate.

=== Republican primary ===
==== Candidates ====
===== Nominee =====
- Tom Price, incumbent U.S. Representative

==== Primary results ====
Republican primary results
Party	Candidate	Votes	%
Republican	Tom Price (incumbent)	44,074	100.0

=== Democratic primary ===
==== Candidates ====
===== Nominee =====
- Bob Montigel, businessman and Army veteran

==== Primary results ====
Democratic primary results
Party	Candidate	Votes	%
Democratic	Robert Montigel	11,493	100.0

=== General election ===
==== Endorsements ====
Tom Price (R)

Organizations

- National Federation of Independent Business
- National Rifle Association - Political Victory Fund
- National Right to Life Committee

==== Predictions ====
Source	Ranking	As of
The Cook Political Report	Safe R	November 3, 2014
Rothenberg	Safe R	October 24, 2014
Sabato's Crystal Ball	Safe R	October 30, 2014
RCP	Safe R	November 2, 2014
Daily Kos Elections	Safe R	November 4, 2014

==== Results ====
Georgia's 6th congressional district, 2014
Party	Candidate	Votes	%
Republican	Tom Price (incumbent)	139,018	66.0
Democratic	Robert Montigel	71,486	34.0
Total votes		210,504	100.0
Republican hold			

== District 7 ==
2014 Georgia's 7th congressional district election
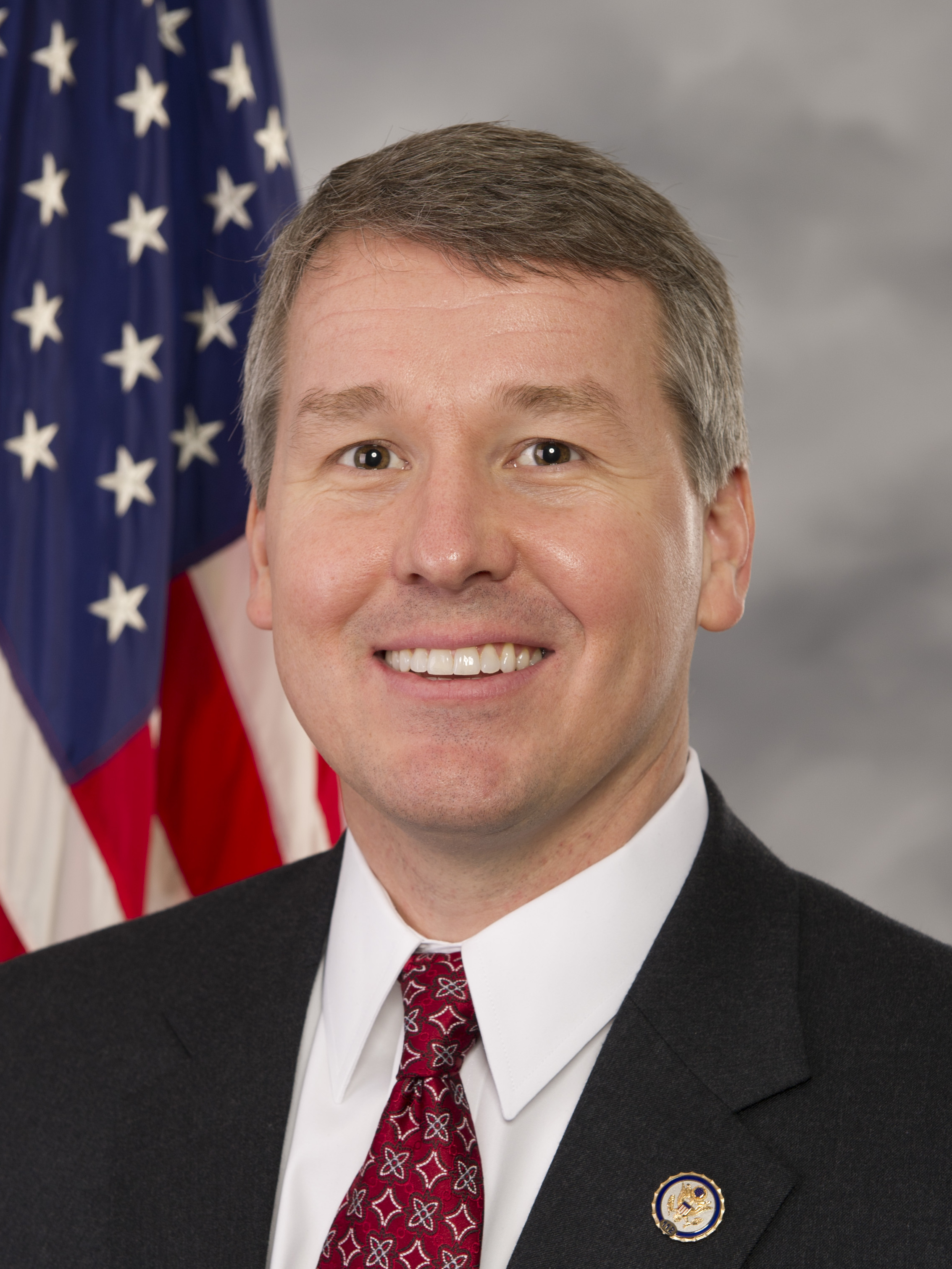

Nominee	Rob Woodall	Thomas Wight
Party	Republican	Democratic
Popular vote	113,557	60,112
Percentage	65.4%	34.6%
- County results Woodall: 60–70% 80–90%
U.S. Representative before election
Rob Woodall
Republican
Elected U.S. Representative
Rob Woodall
Republican

Incumbent Republican representative Rob Woodall, who has represented the Gwinnett County-based district since 2011, was mentioned as a candidate for the U.S. Senate, but he declined to run. Woodall will be opposed by Lilburn City Councilman Thomas Wight as the Democratic candidate.

=== Republican primary ===
==== Candidates ====
===== Nominee =====
- Rob Woodall, incumbent U.S. Representative

==== Primary results ====
Republican primary results
Party	Candidate	Votes	%
Republican	Rob Woodall (incumbent)	33,804	100.0

=== Democratic primary ===
==== Candidates ====
===== Nominee =====
- Thomas Wight, City Councilman

==== Primary results ====
Democratic primary results
Party	Candidate	Votes	%
Democratic	Thomas Wight	7,141	100.0

=== General election ===
==== Endorsements ====
Rob Woodall (R)

Organizations

- National Federation of Independent Business

==== Predictions ====
Source	Ranking	As of
The Cook Political Report	Safe R	November 3, 2014
Rothenberg	Safe R	October 24, 2014
Sabato's Crystal Ball	Safe R	October 30, 2014
RCP	Safe R	November 2, 2014
Daily Kos Elections	Safe R	November 4, 2014

==== Results ====
Georgia's 7th congressional district, 2014
Party	Candidate	Votes	%
Republican	Rob Woodall (incumbent)	113,557	65.4
Democratic	Thomas Wight	60,112	34.6
Total votes		173,669	100.0
Republican hold			

== District 8 ==
2014 Georgia's 8th congressional district election
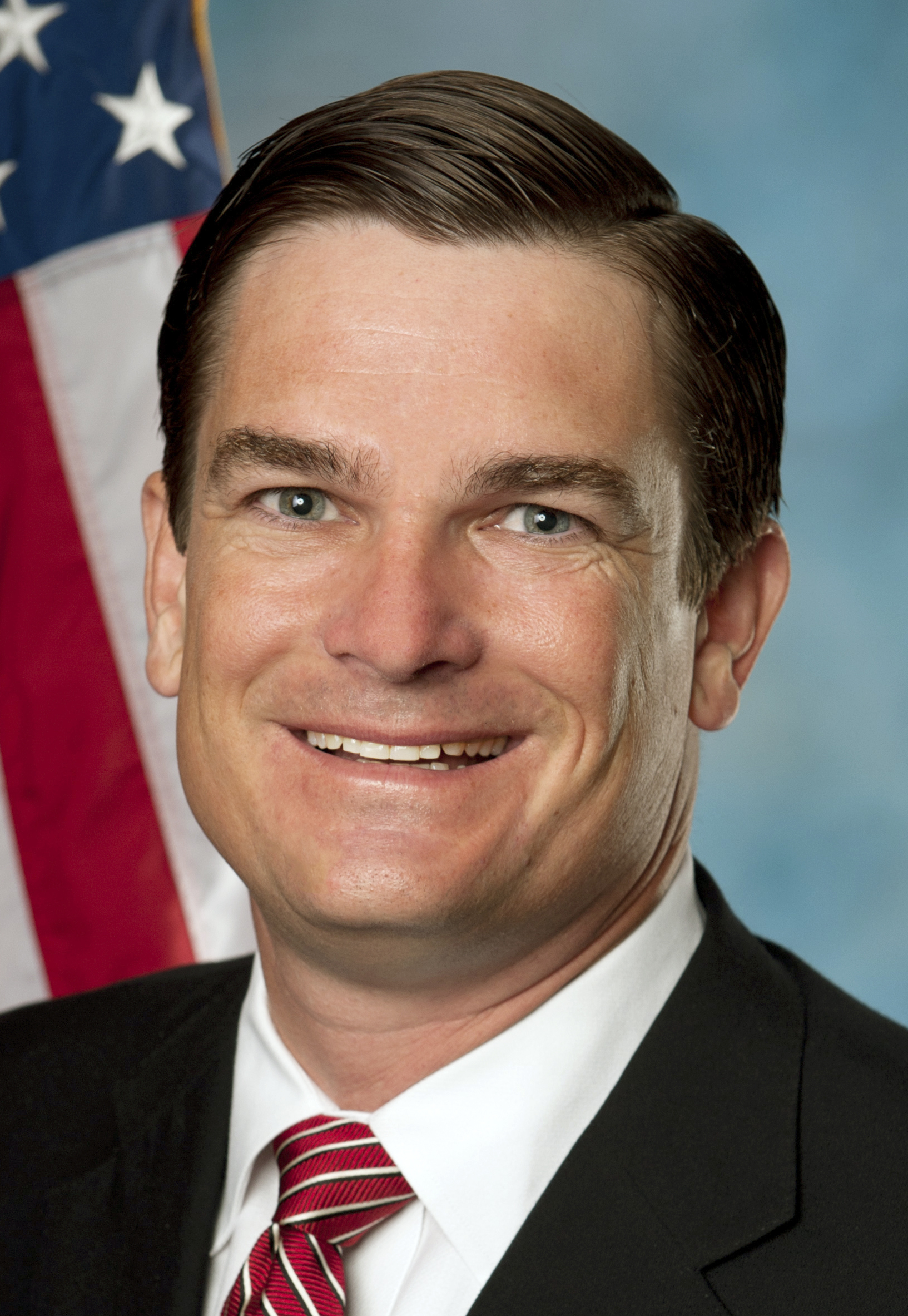
Nominee	Austin Scott
Party	Republican
Popular vote	129,938
Percentage	100%
- County results Scott: 100%
U.S. Representative before election
Austin Scott
Republican
Elected U.S. Representative
Austin Scott
Republican

Incumbent Republican representative Austin Scott, who has represented central Georgia since 2011, was mentioned as a candidate for the U.S. Senate, but he declined to run. He was unopposed in the primary election and was unopposed in the general election.

=== Republican primary ===
==== Candidates ====
===== Nominee =====
- Austin Scott, incumbent U.S. Representative

==== Primary results ====
Republican primary results
Party	Candidate	Votes	%
Republican	Austin Scott (incumbent)	36,073	100

=== General election ===
==== Endorsements ====
Austin Scott (R)

Organizations

- National Federation of Independent Business
- National Rifle Association - Political Victory Fund
- National Right to Life Committee

==== Predictions ====
Source	Ranking	As of
The Cook Political Report	Safe R	November 3, 2014
Rothenberg	Safe R	October 24, 2014
Sabato's Crystal Ball	Safe R	October 30, 2014
RCP	Safe R	November 2, 2014
Daily Kos Elections	Safe R	November 4, 2014

==== Results ====
Georgia's 8th congressional district, 2014
Party	Candidate	Votes	%
Republican	Austin Scott (incumbent)	129,938	100.0
Total votes		129,938	100.0
Republican hold			

== District 9 ==
2014 Georgia's 9th congressional district election
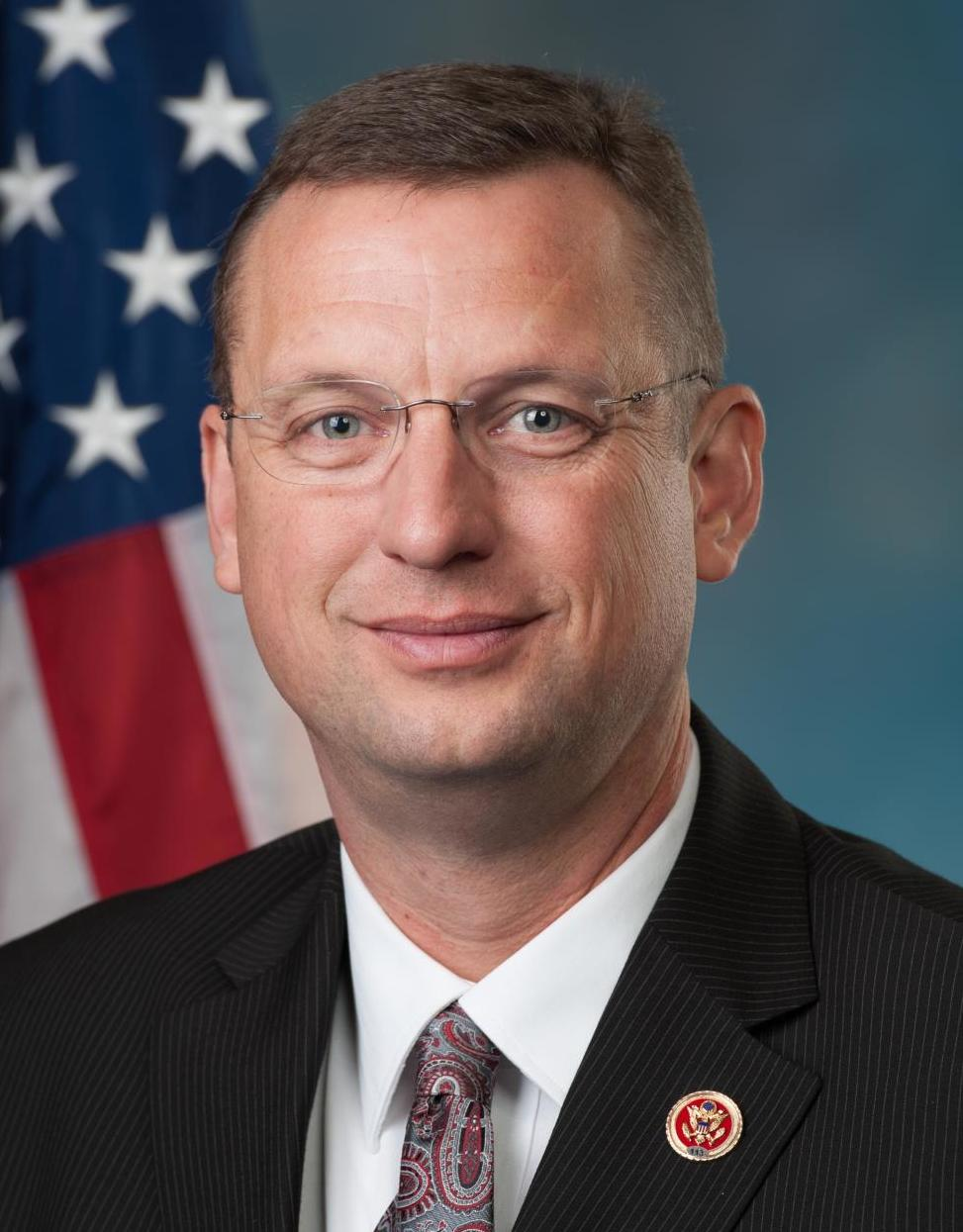

Nominee	Doug Collins	David Vogel
Party	Republican	Democratic
Popular vote	146,059	34,988
Percentage	80.7%	19.3%
- County results Collins: 60–70% 70–80% 80–90% Vogel: 60–70%
U.S. Representative before election
Doug Collins
Republican
Elected U.S. Representative
Doug Collins
Republican

Incumbent Republican representative Doug Collins, who has represented northeastern Georgia since January 2013, was mentioned as a candidate for the U.S. Senate, but he declined to run. He defeated Bernie Fontaine for renomination and will be opposed by Democratic medical researcher David Vogel in the general election.

=== Republican primary ===
==== Candidates ====
===== Nominee =====
- Doug Collins, incumbent U.S. Representative

===== Eliminated in primary =====
- Bernie Fontaine

==== Primary results ====
Republican primary results
Party	Candidate	Votes	%
Republican	Doug Collins (incumbent)	49,951	80.2
Republican	Bernie Fontaine	12,315	19.8
Total votes		62,266	100.0

=== Democratic primary ===
==== Candidates ====
===== Nominee =====
- David Vogel, medical researcher

Democratic primary results
Party	Candidate	Votes	%
Democratic	David Vogel	6,415	100.0

=== General election ===
==== Endorsements ====
Doug Collins (R)

Organizations

- National Federation of Independent Business
- National Rifle Association - Political Victory Fund
- National Right to Life Committee

==== Predictions ====
Source	Ranking	As of
The Cook Political Report	Safe R	November 3, 2014
Rothenberg	Safe R	October 24, 2014
Sabato's Crystal Ball	Safe R	October 30, 2014
RCP	Safe R	November 2, 2014
Daily Kos Elections	Safe R	November 4, 2014

==== Results ====
Georgia's 9th congressional district, 2014
Party	Candidate	Votes	%
Republican	Doug Collins (incumbent)	146,059	80.7
Democratic	David Vogel	34,988	19.3
Total votes		181,047	100.0
Republican hold			

== District 10 ==
2014 Georgia's 10th congressional district election
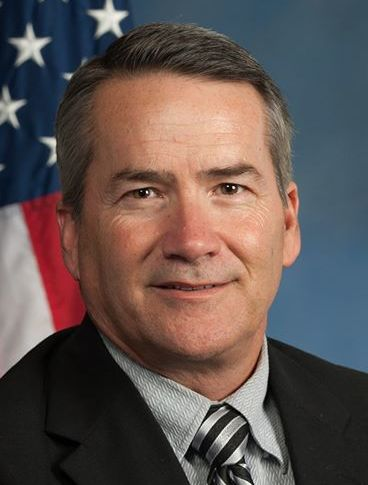

Nominee	Jody Hice	Ken Dious
Party	Republican	Democratic
Popular vote	130,703	65,777
Percentage	66.5%	33.5%
- County results Hice: 50–60% 60–70% 70–80% 80–90% Dious: 50–60% 60–70% 70–80%
U.S. Representative before election
Paul Broun
Republican
Elected U.S. Representative
Jody Hice
Republican

Incumbent Republican representative Paul Broun did not run for re-election, instead running unsuccessfully for the U.S. Senate seat held by retiring Republican Saxby Chambliss.

=== Republican primary ===
==== Candidates ====
===== Nominee =====
- Jody Hice, pastor and candidate for Georgia's 7th congressional district in 2010

===== Eliminated in runoff =====
- Mike Collins, trucking executive and son of former U.S. Representative Mac Collins

===== Eliminated in primary =====
- S. Mitchell Swan, United States Marine Corps Reservist
- Gary Gerrard, attorney
- Donna Sheldon, state representative
- Stephen Simpson, businessman
- Brian Slowinski, former chairman of the Columbia County Republican Party

===== Withdrawn =====
- John Douglas, former state senator

===== Declined =====
- Bill Cowsert, state senator
- John Lunsford, former state representative
- Paul Broun, incumbent U.S. Representative

==== Polling ====
Poll source	Date(s) administered	Sample size	Margin of error	Mike Collins	Gary Gerrard	Jody Hice	Donna Sheldon	Stephen Simpson	Brian Slowinski	Undecided
Rosetta Stone (R-Collins)	December 3–4, 2013	626	± 4.1%	17%	3%	14%	4%	3%	1%	58%

- ^ Internal poll for Mike Collins campaign

==== Primary results ====
Results by county: Hice: 30–40%; 40–50%; 50–60%; Collins: 20–30%; 30–40%; 40–50%; 50–60%; 70–80%; Sheldon: 30–40%; Gerrard: 20–30%; 30–40%

Republican primary results
Party	Candidate	Votes	%
Republican	Jody Hice	17,408	33.5
Republican	Mike Collins	17,143	33.0
Republican	Donna Sheldon	7,972	15.3
Republican	Gary Gerrard	3,830	7.4
Republican	Stephen Simpson	2,423	4.7
Republican	S. Mitchell Swan	2,167	4.2
Republican	Brian Slowinski	1,027	2.0
Total votes		51,970	100.0

==== Runoff ====
Results by county: Hice: 50–60%; 60–70%; Collins: 50–60%; 60–70%; 70–80%

Republican primary runoff results
Party	Candidate	Votes	%
Republican	Jody Hice	26,975	54.3
Republican	Mike Collins	22,684	45.7
Total votes		49,659	100.0

=== Democratic primary ===
==== Candidates ====
===== Nominee =====
- Ken Dious, attorney

===== Declined =====
- Mike Thurmond, former Commissioner of Labor and nominee for the U.S. Senate in 2010

==== Primary results ====
Democratic primary results
Party	Candidate	Votes	%
Democratic	Ken Dious	15,965	100.0

=== General election ===
==== Endorsements ====
Jody Hice (R)

Organizations

- Eagle Forum
- National Rifle Association - Political Victory Fund
- National Right to Life Committee

==== Predictions ====
Source	Ranking	As of
The Cook Political Report	Safe R	November 3, 2014
Rothenberg	Safe R	October 24, 2014
Sabato's Crystal Ball	Safe R	October 30, 2014
RCP	Safe R	November 2, 2014
Daily Kos Elections	Safe R	November 4, 2014

==== Results ====
Georgia's 10th congressional district, 2014
Party	Candidate	Votes	%
Republican	Jody Hice	130,703	66.5
Democratic	Ken Dious	65,777	33.5
Total votes		196,480	100.0
Republican hold			

== District 11 ==
2014 Georgia's 11th congressional district election
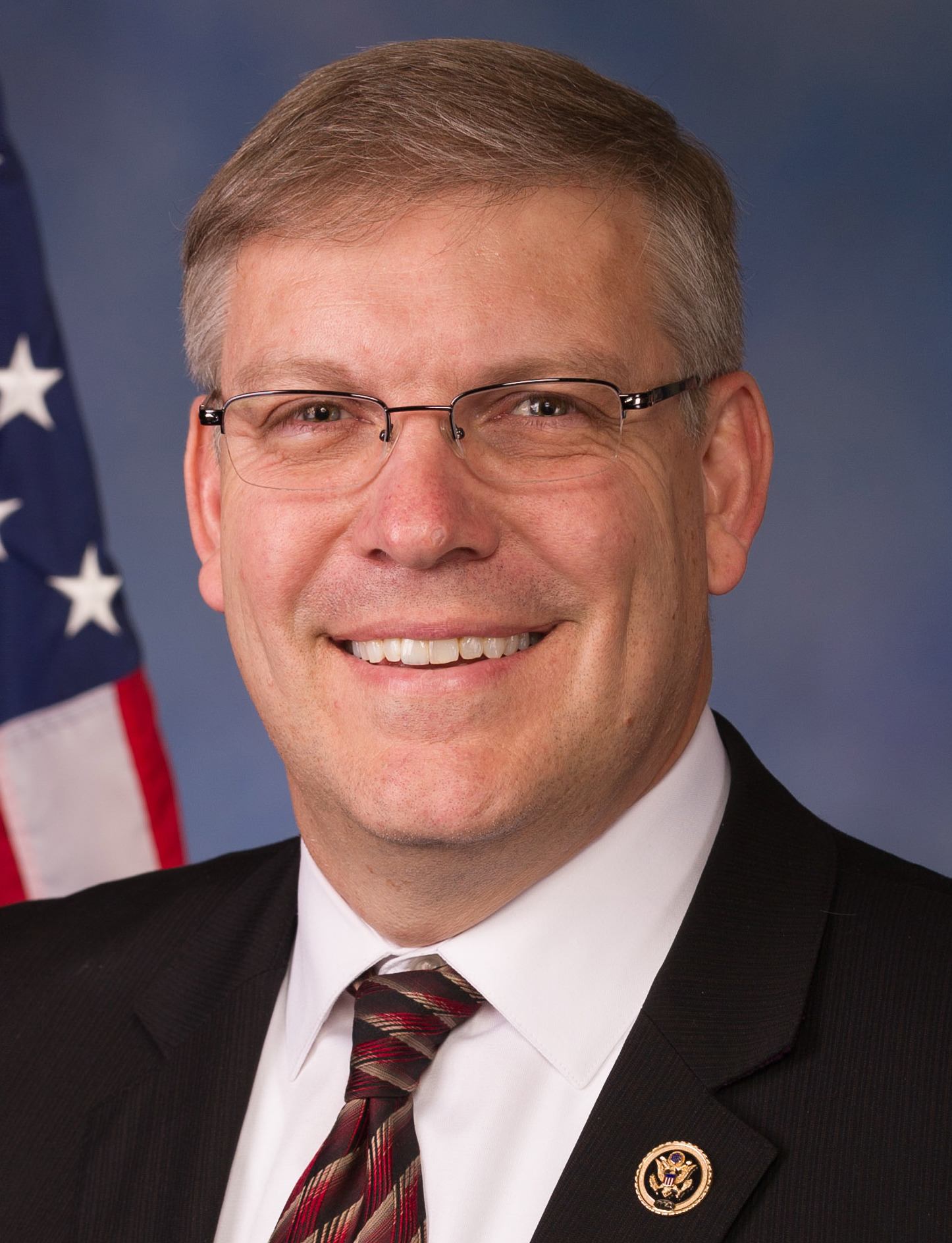
Nominee	Barry Loudermilk
Party	Republican
Popular vote	161,532
Percentage	100.0%
- County results Loudermilk: >90%
U.S. Representative before election
Phil Gingrey
Republican
Elected U.S. Representative
Barry Loudermilk
Republican

Incumbent Republican representative Phil Gingrey did not run for re-election, instead running unsuccessfully for the U.S. Senate seat held by retiring Republican Saxby Chambliss.

Democrat Patrick Thompson, a technology sales executive and the nominee for the seat in 2012, planned to run again, but ultimately declined to do so.

=== Republican primary ===
==== Candidates ====
===== Nominee =====
- Barry Loudermilk, state senator

===== Eliminated in primary =====
- Bob Barr, former U.S. Representative and Libertarian Party Presidential nominee in 2008
- Allan Levene, businessman
- Ed Lindsey, Majority Whip of the Georgia House of Representatives
- Larry Mrozinski, U.S. Army veteran
- Tricia Pridemore, businesswoman and former State Workforce Development Executive Director

===== Withdrawn =====
- Hayden Collins, radio talk show host
- Susan M. Davis, cancer research activist

===== Declined =====
- Phil Gingrey, incumbent U.S. Representative
- Judson Hill, state senator

==== Polling ====
Poll source	Date(s) administered	Sample size	Margin of error	Bob Barr	Allan Levene	Ed Lindsey	Barry Loudermilk	Larry Mrozinski	Tricia Pridemore	Other/ Undecided
Landmark/Rosetta Stone	April 17, 2014	500	± 4.5%	23%	3%	8%	25%	4%	11%	26%
RightPath (R-Loudermilk)	March 20–24, 2014	600	± 4.08%	12.2%	0.3%	2.7%	12.3%	0.3%	3.7%	68.5%

==== Primary results ====
Results by county: Loudermilk: 20–30%; 40–50%; 60–70%; Lindsey: 40–50%

Republican primary results
Party	Candidate	Votes	%
Republican	Barry Loudermilk	20,862	36.6
Republican	Bob Barr	14,704	25.8
Republican	Tricia Pridemore	9,745	17.1
Republican	Ed Lindsey	8,448	14.8
Republican	Larry Mrozinski	2,288	4.0
Republican	Allan Levene	962	1.7
Total votes		57,009	100.0

==== Runoff ====
===== Polling =====
Poll source	Date(s) administered	Sample size	Margin of error	Bob Barr	Barry Loudermilk	Other	Undecided
Magellan Strategies (R-Loudermilk)	July 7–8, 2014	719	± 3.65%	28%	49%	—	23%

===== Results =====
Results by county: Loudermilk: 50–60%; 60–70%; 70–80%

Republican primary runoff results
Party	Candidate	Votes	%
Republican	Barry Loudermilk	34,667	66.1
Republican	Bob Barr	17,807	33.9
Total votes		52,474	100.0

=== Democratic primary ===
==== Candidates ====
===== Declined =====
- Patrick Thompson, technology sales executive and nominee for this seat in 2012

=== General election ===
==== Endorsements ====
Barry Loudermilk (R)

Organizations

- Club for Growth
- National Rifle Association - Political Victory Fund
- National Right to Life Committee
- Tea Party Express

==== Predictions ====
Source	Ranking	As of
The Cook Political Report	Safe R	November 3, 2014
Rothenberg	Safe R	October 24, 2014
Sabato's Crystal Ball	Safe R	October 30, 2014
RCP	Safe R	November 2, 2014
Daily Kos Elections	Safe R	November 4, 2014

==== Results ====
Georgia's 11th congressional district, 2014
Party	Candidate	Votes	%
Republican	Barry Loudermilk	161,532	100.0
Total votes		161,532	100.0
Republican hold			

== District 12 ==
2014 Georgia's 12th congressional district election
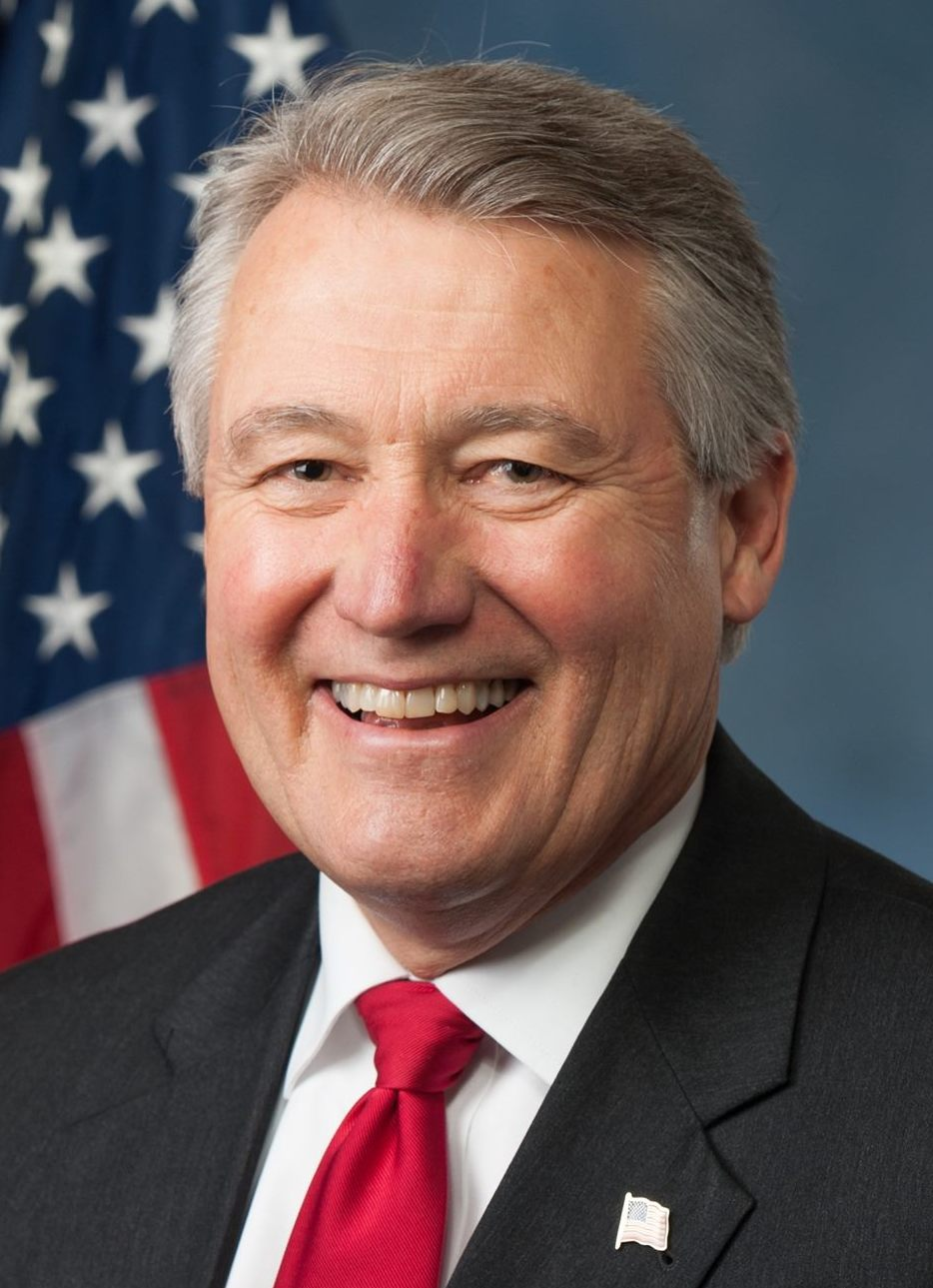

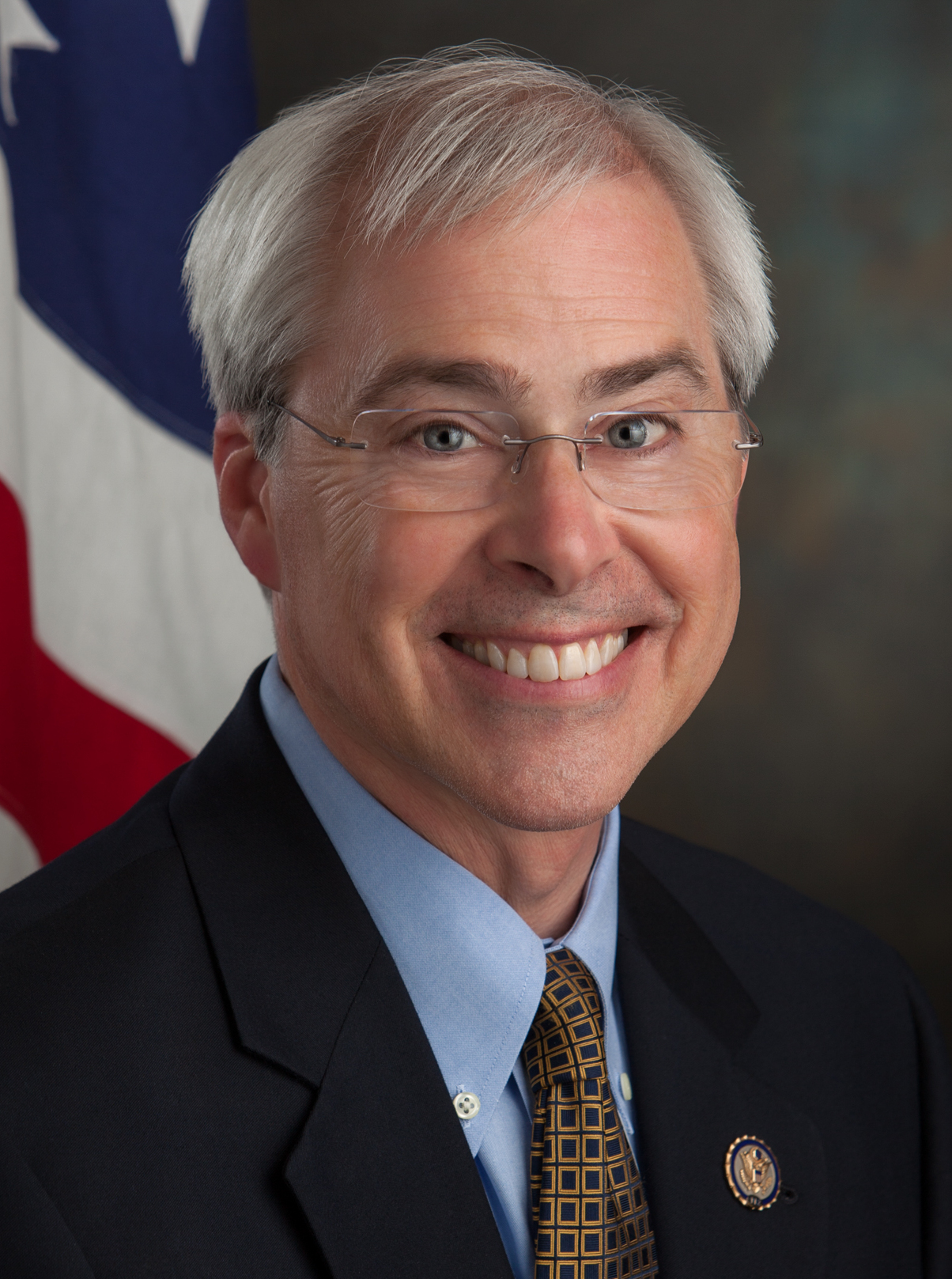
Nominee	Rick W. Allen	John Barrow
Party	Republican	Democratic
Popular vote	91,336	75,478
Percentage	54.8%	45.2%
- County results Allen: 50–60% 60–70% 70–80% Barrow: 50–60% 60–70%
U.S. Representative before election
John Barrow
Democratic
Elected U.S. Representative
Rick W. Allen
Republican

Incumbent Democratic representative John Barrow, who has represented southeastern Georgia since 2005, was mentioned as a candidate for the U.S. Senate, but he declined to run.

=== Democratic primary ===
==== Candidates ====
===== Nominee =====
- John Barrow, incumbent U.S. Representative

==== Primary results ====
Democratic primary results
Party	Candidate	Votes	%
Democratic	John Barrow (incumbent)	26,324	100.0

=== Republican primary ===
==== Nominee ====
- Rick W. Allen, businessman and candidate for this seat in 2012

==== Eliminated in primary ====
- Delvis Dutton, state representative
- John Stone, Congressional aide and nominee for this seat in 2008
- Diane Vann, army nurse and candidate for Georgia's 8th congressional district in 2010
- Eugene Yu, businessman

==== Declined ====
- Deke Copenhaver, Mayor of Augusta
- Wright McLeod, real estate lawyer and retired Navy commander and candidate for this seat in 2012
- Tommie Williams, state senator

==== Polling ====
Poll source	Date(s) administered	Sample size	Margin of error	Rick Allen	Delvis Dutton	John Stone	Diane Vann	Eugene Yu	Undecided
Landmark/Rosetta Stone	May 1, 2014	500	± 4.5%	40%	8%	8%	3%	15%	26%

==== Primary results ====
Republican primary results
Party	Candidate	Votes	%
Republican	Rick Allen	25,093	54.0
Republican	Eugene Yu	7,677	16.5
Republican	Delvis Dutton	6,644	14.3
Republican	John Stone	5,826	12.5
Republican	Diane Vann	1,237	2.7
Total votes		46,477	100.0

=== General election ===
==== Campaign ====
Despite spending most of the campaign at a financial disadvantage to the incumbent, the Allen campaign capitalized on a Barrow fundraising letter sent during the 2012 campaign saying that he had voted with President Obama, whose approval was at an all-time low, 85 percent of the time. Despite PolitiFact rating the NRCC ads highlighting this as "Mostly False", they were nevertheless credited as helping to nationalize the race in a way that was damaging to Barrow.

==== Endorsements ====
John Barrow (D)

Labor unions

- National Association of Letter Carriers

Organizations

- BIPAC
- Blue Dog Coalition
- Democratic Congressional Campaign Committee "Frontline" Program
- National Federation of Independent Business
- National Rifle Association - Political Victory Fund
- New Democrat Coalition
- No Labels
- United States Chamber of Commerce
Rick Allen (R)

Organizations

- National Right to Life Committee
- Tea Party Express

==== Polling ====
Poll source	Date(s) administered	Sample size	Margin of error	John Barrow (D)	Rick Allen (R)	Undecided
Landmark Communications	November 2, 2014	500	± 4.38%	46%	47%	7%
Landmark Communications	October 30, 2014	500	± 4.38%	44%	48%	8%
New York Times/CBS News Battleground Tracker	October 16–23, 2014	197	± 14%	46%	42%	12%
Public Opinion Strategies (R-Allen)	September 15–17, 2014	400	—	44%	42%	11%

==== Debates ====
- Complete video of debate, October 26, 2014

==== Predictions ====
Source	Ranking	As of
The Cook Political Report	Tossup	November 3, 2014
Rothenberg	Lean D	October 24, 2014
Sabato's Crystal Ball	Lean D	October 30, 2014
RCP	Tossup	November 2, 2014
Daily Kos Elections	Tossup	November 4, 2014

==== Results ====
Georgia's 12th congressional district election, 2014
Party	Candidate	Votes	%
Republican	Rick Allen	91,336	54.8
Democratic	John Barrow (incumbent)	75,478	45.2
Total votes		166,814	100.0
Republican gain from Democratic			

== District 13 ==
2014 Georgia's 13th congressional district election
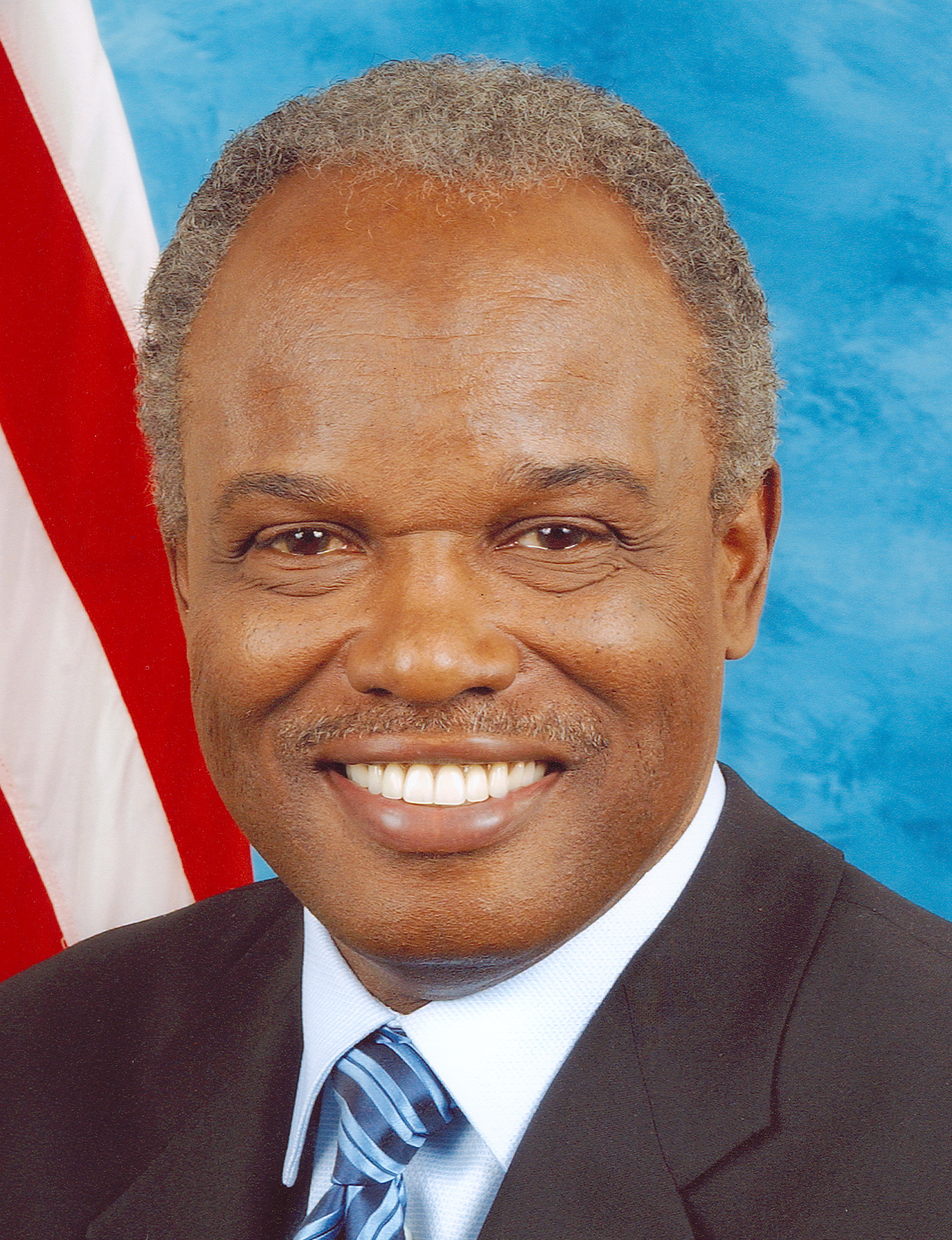
Nominee	David Scott
Party	Democratic
Popular vote	159,445
Percentage	100.0%
- County results Scott: 100%
U.S. Representative before election
David Scott
Democratic
Elected U.S. Representative
David Scott
Democratic

Incumbent Democratic representative David Scott has represented the western and southern portions of the Atlanta metropolitan area since 2003. Michael Owens, a businessman and Marine Corps veteran, ran against Scott in the primary, but was defeated. Scott was unopposed in the general election.

=== Democratic primary ===
==== Candidates ====
===== Nominee =====
- David Scott, incumbent U.S. Representative

===== Eliminated in primary =====
- Michael Owens, businessman and Marine Corps veteran

==== Primary results ====
Democratic primary results
Party	Candidate	Votes	%
Democratic	David Scott (incumbent)	29,486	82.2
Democratic	Michael Owens	6,367	17.8
Total votes		35,853	100.0

=== General election ===
==== Endorsements ====
David Scott (D)

Labor unions

- AFL-CIO
- National Association of Letter Carriers

Organizations

- Blue Dog Coalition
- New Democrat Coalition
- Sierra Club

==== Predictions ====
Source	Ranking	As of
The Cook Political Report	Safe D	November 3, 2014
Rothenberg	Safe D	October 24, 2014
Sabato's Crystal Ball	Safe D	October 30, 2014
RCP	Safe D	November 2, 2014
Daily Kos Elections	Safe D	November 4, 2014

==== Results ====
Georgia's 13th congressional district, 2014
Party	Candidate	Votes	%
Democratic	David Scott (incumbent)	159,445	100.0
Total votes		159,445	100.0
Democratic hold			

== District 14 ==
2014 Georgia's 14th congressional district election
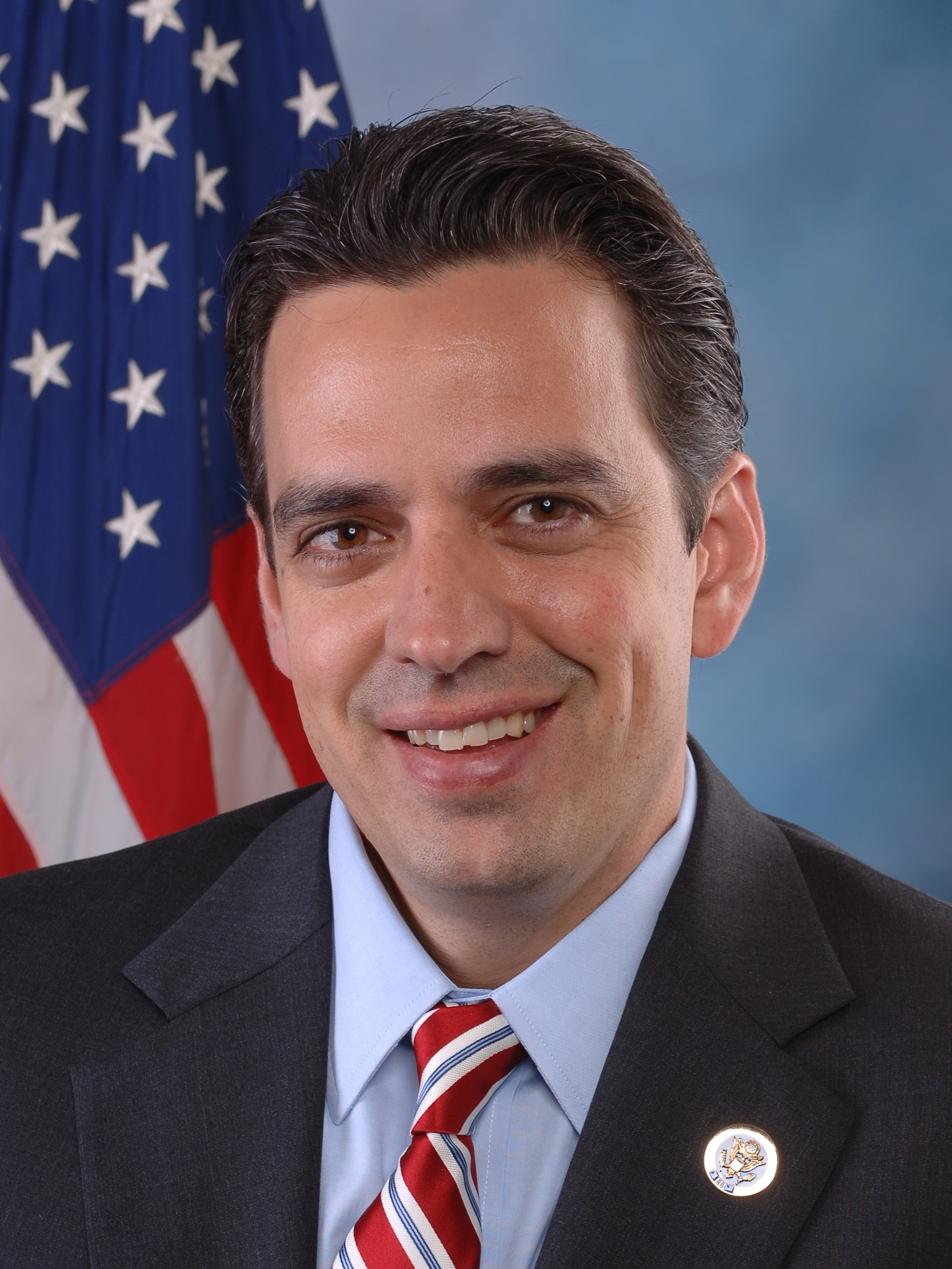
Nominee	Tom Graves
Party	Republican
Popular vote	216,743
Percentage	100.0%
- County results Graves: 100%
U.S. Representative before election
Tom Graves
Republican
Elected U.S. Representative
Tom Graves
Republican

Incumbent Republican representative Tom Graves, who has represented northwestern Georgia since 2010, was mentioned as a candidate for the U.S. Senate, but he declined to run. He was unsuccessfully challenged in the Republican primary by manager and business consultant Ken Herron, and was unopposed in the general election.

=== Republican primary ===
==== Candidates ====
===== Nominee =====
- Tom Graves, incumbent U.S. Representative

===== Eliminated in primary =====
- Ken Herron, business consultant

==== Primary results ====
Republican primary results
Party	Candidate	Votes	%
Republican	Tom Graves (incumbent)	32,343	74.1
Republican	Ken Herron	11,324	25.9
Total votes		43,667	100.0

=== General election ===
==== Endorsements ====
Tom Graves (R)

Organizations

- National Federation of Independent Business
- National Rifle Association - Political Victory Fund
- National Right to Life Committee

==== Predictions ====
Source	Ranking	As of
The Cook Political Report	Safe R	November 3, 2014
Rothenberg	Safe R	October 24, 2014
Sabato's Crystal Ball	Safe R	October 30, 2014
RCP	Safe R	November 2, 2014
Daily Kos Elections	Safe R	November 4, 2014

==== Results ====
Georgia's 14th congressional district, 2014
Party	Candidate	Votes	%
Republican	Tom Graves (incumbent)	118,782	100.0
Total votes		118,782	100.0
Republican hold			

== See also ==
- 2014 United States House of Representatives elections
- 2014 United States elections
