= Eric Tanenblatt =

American lawyer

Personal details
- Born: August 15, 1966 (age 60) Commack, New York, U.S.
- Party: Republican
- Education: Emory University Georgetown University

Eric Tanenblatt (born in Long Island in 1966) is a U.S. Republican Party activist from the state of Georgia. He was a presidential elector in 2000 and 2004. He later served as chief of staff to Governor Sonny Perdue. Tanenblatt is currently a principal and head of the public policy practice at the global law firm of Dentons US LLP.

== Career ==
=== Bush administration ===
Tanenblatt served in the administration of President George H. W. Bush from 1989 to 1991. He served as a Special Assistant to Secretary Louis Sullivan, focusing on Congressional and legislative affairs at the U.S. Department of Health and Human Services. Tanenblatt was also Director of Intergovernmental Affairs at the Peace Corps, where he served as the agency's liaison to the White House, Congress and all federal departments and agencies.

=== Political campaigning ===
Tanenblatt served as a political advisor and National Finance Co-Chair for Governor Mitt Romney's 2012 Presidential campaign. His association with Governor Romney extends back to the Governor's chairmanship of the Republican Governors Association (RGA) in 2004 when Tanenblatt served as Finance Co-Chair for the organization. He also served as the State Chairman for Governor Romney's 2008 primary campaign in Georgia.

Tanenblatt was an advisor to the late U.S. Senator Paul Coverdell, serving as director of his 1992 campaign for the U.S. Senate, vice chairman of his 1998 reelection campaign, and served as the Senator's State Director in Georgia. He also held senior positions in the 1996 presidential campaigns of Bob Dole and Phil Gramm.

In 2000, Tanenblatt served as the state chairman for President George W. Bush's campaign effort in Georgia. He was a member of the Electoral College during the 2000 Presidential election in Georgia and the 2004 Presidential election in Georgia.

=== Perdue administration ===
Tanenblatt started working at Long Aldridge & Norman which later became McKenna Long & Aldridge and is now the global law firm Dentons. He left to serve as Chief of Staff to Governor Sonny Perdue, then returned in 2004. He continued his work with Governor Perdue as state coordinator for the 2004 G8 Summit that was held at Sea Island, Georgia. He later served as the finance chairman for the Governor's 2006 reelection campaign.

=== Private career ===
Tanenblatt led the National Government Affairs Group at McKenna Long & Aldridge LLP. His practice focuses on governmental and regulatory affairs at the federal, state and local levels. He was named by the Atlanta Journal-Constitution as one of the state's "Movers and Shakers"

== Political fundraising ==
Tanenblatt was dubbed a "Ranger" by the President George W. Bush re-election campaign in 2003—a designation for supporters who account for at least $200,000 in contributions. On June 20, 2003, his efforts, combined with those of Reynolds Plantation luxury resort owner Jamie Reynolds, raised at least $2.25 million from donors in one evening at a fundraiser at the resort.

== Board memberships ==
Tanenblatt was appointed by President George W. Bush to a term on the 15-member board of directors of the Corporation for National and Community Service, and in 2010, he was elected vice chair. He currently serves as a National Finance Co-Chair of the Republican Governor's Association. Tanenblatt is also the chairman of the Georgia Chamber of Commerce Tax Committee and is a member of the boards of directors of the Metro Atlanta Chamber of Commerce, and the Georgia Public Policy Foundation. He is a co-founder and past chairman of Hands on Georgia, a statewide program to organize community volunteer efforts throughout the state of Georgia.
