= 2008 DeKalb County, Georgia Chief Executive Officer election =

- November 4, 2008
Candidate	Burrell Ellis
Party	Democratic
Popular vote	263,114
Percentage	99.48%
CEO before election
Vernon Jones
Democratic
Elected CEO
Burrell Ellis
Democratic

The 2008 DeKalb County, Georgia Chief Executive Officer election took place on November 4, 2008. Incumbent CEO Vernon Jones was term limited and could not seek a third consecutive term, and unsuccessfully ran for the U.S. Senate. In the Democratic primary to succeed Jones, County Commissioner Burrell Ellis; State Representative Stan Watson; Ann Kimbrough, Jones's Chief of Staff; former State Senator Steen Miles; and perennial candidate Joe Bembry all ran.

Ellis placed first in the primary with 46 percent of the vote, but did not win a majority, and advanced to a runoff election with Watson, who won 26 percent and placed second. In the runoff election, Ellis defeated Watson by a wide margin, winning 63 percent of the vote. Ellis faced no opponent in the general election and won his first term unopposed.

== Democratic primary ==
=== Candidates ===
- Burrell Ellis, County Commissioner
- Stan Watson, State Representative
- Ann Kimbrough, Chief of Staff to CEO Vernon Jones
- Steen Miles, former State Senator
- Joe Bembry, perennial candidate

=== Results ===
Democratic primary results
Party	Candidate	Votes	%
Democratic	Burrell Ellis	31,379	45.84%
Democratic	Stan Watson	17,872	26.11%
Democratic	Ann Kimbrough	9,325	13.62%
Democratic	Steen Miles	6,458	9.43%
Democratic	Joe Bembry	3,422	5.00%
Total votes		68,456	100.00%

=== Runoff results ===
Democratic primary runoff results
Party	Candidate	Votes	%
Democratic	Burrell Ellis	38,775	62.56%
Democratic	Stan Watson	23,208	37.44%
Total votes		61,983	100.00%

== General election ==
=== Results ===
2008 DeKalb County, Georgia Chief Executive Officer election
Party	Candidate	Votes	%
Democratic	Burrell Ellis	263,114	99.48%
Write-in		1,372	0.52%
Total votes		264,486	100.00%
Democratic hold			
