= Laughing Matters =

American improvisational comedy troupe

Laughing Matters is the longest-running improvisational comedy troupe in Atlanta, Georgia, US. Formed in 1985, the troupe has since branched out and now provides a wide variety of audience interactive entertainment, including murder mysteries, team building, and children’s performances.

Laughing Matters performs both public and private shows at venues that include the Alliance Theatre, Dave & Busters, and the Fox Theatre. They perform improv comedy monthly at a public show at Manuel's Tavern (founded by prominent Atlanta politician Manuel Maloof).

Colleges where Laughing Matters have performed include Emory University, Georgia Tech, and the University of Georgia. Corporate clients include the 1996 Paralympic Organization Committee, BusinessWeek, Coca-Cola, IBM, and the March of Dimes.

For several years, members of Laughing Matters have portrayed clients and witnesses for the National Criminal Defense College in a program designed to sharpen the skills of defense lawyers. The National Criminal Defense College is held in Macon, Georgia, adjacent to Mercer Law School.

== Notable current and former performers ==
- Gary Anthony Williams plays a recurring character on the television series Boston Legal and has numerous TV and film credits.
- Nick Jameson has appeared in numerous video games and animated series.
- Brian Sack is a correspondent on CNN Headline's Glenn Beck program.
- Mike Schatz voices the character of Emory on the animated series Aqua Teen Hunger Force.
