= Liane Levetan =

American politician (born 1936)

Member of the Georgia Senate from the 40 district
- In office 2003–2005
- Preceded by: Rusty Paul
- Succeeded by: Dan Weber

CEO of DeKalb County, Georgia
- In office 1993–2000
- Preceded by: Manuel Maloof
- Succeeded by: Vernon Jones

Member of the DeKalb County Board of Commissioners for District 2
- In office 1975–1985

Personal details
- Born: 1936 (age 89–90) Vienna, Austria
- Party: Democratic

Liane Levetan is an American politician. Initially a special education teacher, in 1975, Levetan became the first woman elected to the DeKalb County Board of Commissioners, in which she represented District 2 until 1985. After being defeated in 1984 by Manuel Maloof for CEO, from 1993 to 2000, Levetan served as CEO of DeKalb County. From 2003 to 2005, Levetan served as a member of the Georgia State Senate.

Levetan serves as a District 7 member of the board of directors of the Atlanta Regional Commission.
