= 2004 DeKalb County, Georgia Chief Executive Officer election =

- November 2, 2004
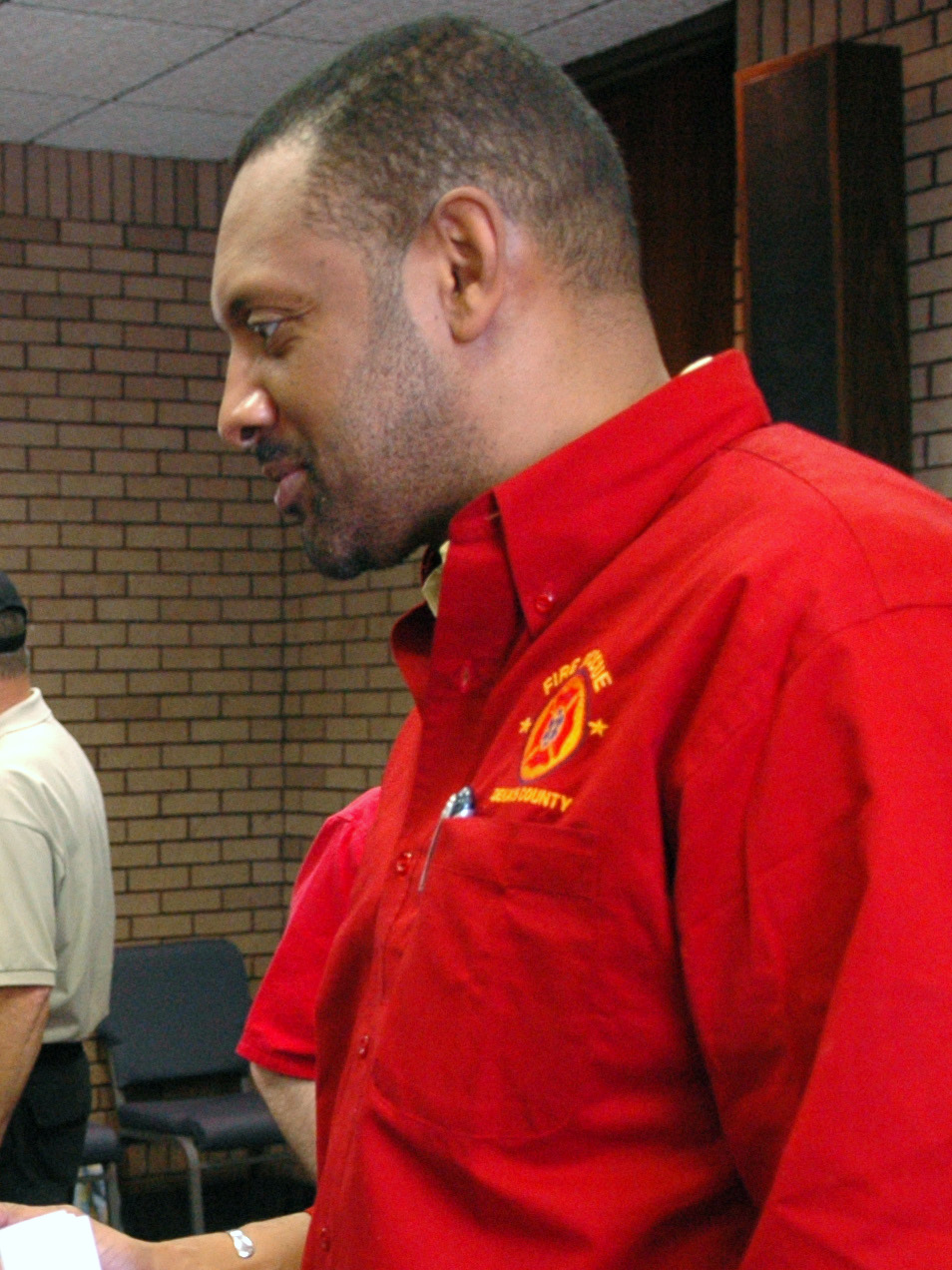
Candidate	Vernon Jones
Party	Democratic
Popular vote	193,211
Percentage	95.91%
CEO before election
Vernon Jones
Democratic
Elected CEO
Vernon Jones
Democratic

The 2004 DeKalb County, Georgia Chief Executive Officer election took place on November 2, 2004. Incumbent CEO Vernon Jones ran for re-election to a second term. Jones, who experienced controversy in office and faced a grand jury inquiry into county finances and his security detail, was challenged by six opponents in the Democratic primary. However, Jones won renomination with 53 percent of the vote, avoiding the need for a runoff election. In the general election, Jones faced no Republican opposition and won 95 percent of the vote.

== Democratic primary ==
=== Candidates ===
- Vernon Jones, incumbent chief executive officer
- Judy Yates, County Commissioner
- Teresa Greene-Johnson, State Representative
- Joe Bembry, tow truck operator and perennial candidate
- Doug Teper, State Representative
- Ron Marshall, activist
- Calvin E. Sims Sr., MARTA mechanic

=== Results ===
Democratic primary results
Party	Candidate	Votes	%
Democratic	Vernon Jones (inc.)	54,400	53.16%
Democratic	Judy Yates	24,938	24.37%
Democratic	Teresa Greene-Johnson	10,705	10.46%
Democratic	Joe Bembry	4,994	4.88%
Democratic	Doug Teper	4,886	4.77%
Democratic	Ron Marshall	1,538	1.50%
Democratic	Calvin E. Sims, Jr.	875	0.86%
Total votes		102,336	100.00%

== General election ==
=== Results ===
2004 DeKalb County, Georgia Chief Executive Officer election
Party	Candidate	Votes	%
Democratic	Vernon Jones (inc.)	193,211	95.91%
Write-in		8,244	4.09%
Total votes		201,455	100.00%
Democratic hold			
