= 2012 DeKalb County, Georgia Chief Executive Officer election =

- November 6, 2012
Candidate	Burrell Ellis
Party	Democratic
Popular vote	243,383
Percentage	98.82%
CEO before election
Burrell Ellis
Democratic
Elected CEO
Burrell Ellis
Democratic

The 2012 DeKalb County, Georgia Chief Executive Officer election took place on November 6, 2012. Incumbent CEO Burrell Ellis ran for re-election to a second term. Though he faced little-known opponents in the primary, he faced controversy over his relationship with the County Commission. Ellis ultimately won renomination without need for a runoff, but by a narrower margin than expected, receiving 60 percent of the vote. In the general election, Ellis faced no opposition and won his second term uncontested.

== Democratic primary ==
=== Candidates ===
- Burrell Ellis, incumbent CEO
- Gregory Adams, minister, former police officer
- Jerome Edmondson, businessman

=== Results ===
Democratic primary results
Party	Candidate	Votes	%
Democratic	Burrell Ellis (inc.)	48,065	60.37%
Democratic	Gregory Adams	16,303	20.48%
Democratic	Jerome Edmondson	15,247	19.15%
Total votes		79,615	100.00%

== General election ==
=== Results ===
2012 DeKalb County, Georgia Chief Executive Officer election
Party	Candidate	Votes	%
Democratic	Burrell Ellis (inc.)	243,383	98.82%
Write-in		2,895	1.18%
Total votes		246,278	100.00%
Democratic hold			
