= Jim Martin (Georgia politician) =

American politician

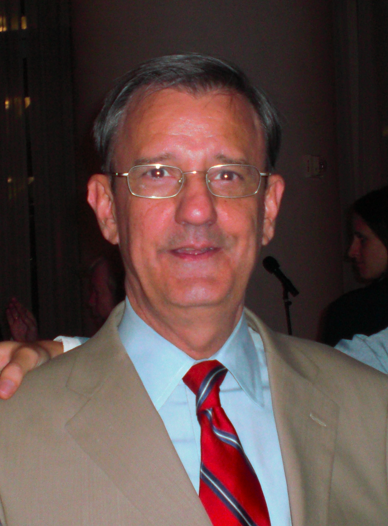
- Martin in 2008

Member of the Georgia House of Representatives
- In office January 3, 1984 – September 26, 2001
- Preceded by: Sidney Marcus
- Succeeded by: Pat Gardner
- Constituency: 26th district (1984–1993); 47th district (1993–2001)

Personal details
- Born: James Francis Martin; August 22, 1945 (age 81) Atlanta, Georgia, U.S.
- Party: Democratic
- Spouse: Joan Martin
- Children: 4
- Education: University of Georgia (BA, JD, LLM); Georgia State University (MBA)
- Profession: Attorney

Military service
- Branch/service: United States Army
- Battles/wars: Vietnam War

James Francis Martin (born August 22, 1945) is an American politician and former member of the Georgia General Assembly. A member of the Democratic Party, Martin opposed incumbent U.S. Senator Saxby Chambliss in the 2008 election. In the general election, no candidate received more than 50% of the vote, forcing a run-off election on December 2, 2008, which Martin subsequently lost.

== Early life, education, and military service ==
Martin was born in Atlanta, Georgia and grew up in a family of six boys. As a child he contracted polio.

In 1963, after graduating from Atlanta's public school system, he enrolled at the University of Georgia, where he was elected freshman class president. He was a member of the Sigma Chi fraternity at the University of Georgia as was his political opponent Senator Saxby Chambliss. After earning his bachelor's and J.D. degrees at Georgia, he entered the U.S. Army and completed a tour of duty in Vietnam.

After his return from the war, Martin re-enrolled at the University of Georgia and earned an LL.M. degree, subsequently working as a private attorney and as assistant legislative counsel to the Georgia General Assembly. In 1980, he earned an M.B.A. from Georgia State University.

== Political career ==
=== Georgia House of Representatives ===
Martin won a special election to the Georgia House of Representatives in 1983. He served in the Assembly from 1983 to 2001, winning re-election in 1984, 1986, 1988, 1990, 1992, 1994, 1996, 1998 and 2000. During his tenure in the House, Martin served as chairman of several committees, including the Judiciary Committee and the Human Services Subcommittee of the Appropriations Committee. He also served as an active member of the Industrial Relations, Special Judiciary and Children and Youth Committees.

In September 2001, Martin relinquished his House seat and was appointed Commissioner of Human Resources by Governor Roy Barnes. On September 19, 2003, he resigned from his position as Commissioner.

From 2004 to 2005, Martin served as the Chief Legal Officer of the Georgia Public Defender Standards Council.

=== 2006 Georgia Lieutenant Governor election ===
Martin was the Democratic nominee for Lieutenant Governor of Georgia in 2006. He received the endorsement of former Governor Roy Barnes, but was defeated by Republican candidate Casey Cagle.

From 2007 to 2008, Martin was an Executive Fellow at the Georgia State University Andrew Young School of Policy Studies.

=== 2008 United States Senate election ===
On March 19, 2008, Martin launched his campaign for U.S. Senate against incumbent Republican senator Saxby Chambliss. He came in second to Vernon Jones in the Democratic primary election and advanced to a run-off election. On August 5, 2008, Martin defeated Jones in the run-off, and prepared to face Chambliss in the general election in November.

For most of the year, incumbent Senator Saxby Chambliss held a comfortable lead in the polls, but the race tightened closer to the election. In the general election on November 4, 2008, Chambliss fell .2% shy of the simple majority needed to win the election and Martin finished about 3% behind. As no candidate received a majority of the vote, a run-off election was held on December 2, 2008, between Martin and Chambliss. Chambliss went on to win the run-off with 57% of the vote to Martin's 43%.

== Personal life ==
Jim Martin has been married to Joan Martin since 1970 and has four children and four grandchildren. He is also an elder at Atlanta's Morningside Presbyterian Church (Presbyterian Church USA).

Georgia House of Representatives
Preceded by Sidney Marcus	Member of the Georgia House of Representatives from the 26th district 1983–1993	Succeeded by Charlie Watts
Preceded by Tom Sherrill	Member of the Georgia House of Representatives from the 47th district 1993–2001	Succeeded by Pat Gardner
Party political offices
Preceded by Mark Taylor	Democratic nominee for Lieutenant Governor of Georgia; 2006	Succeeded by Carol Porter
Preceded by Max Cleland	Democratic Party nominee for United States Senator from Georgia (Class 2); 2008	Succeeded by Michelle Nunn
