= 1981 Atlanta mayoral election =

- October 6, 1981 (general); October 27, 1981 (runoff)
- Turnout: 61.26% (general); 64.04% (runoff)
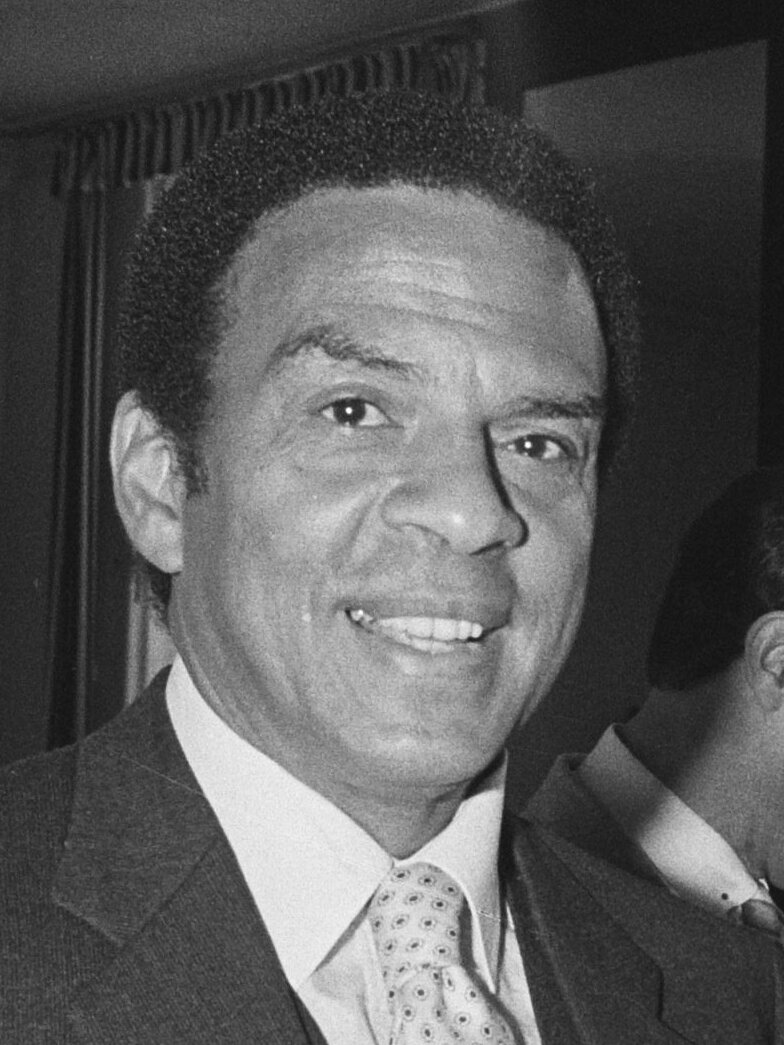

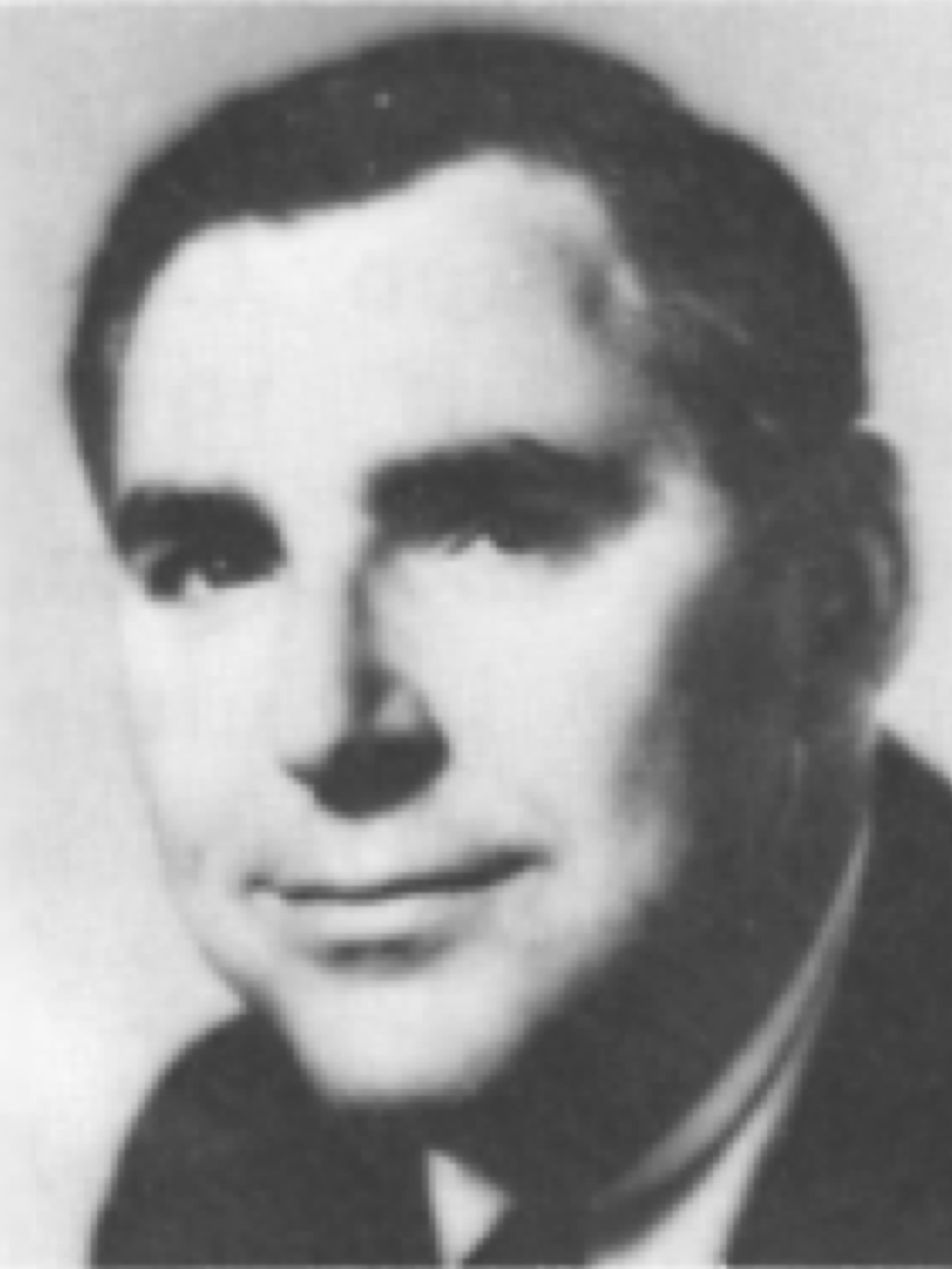

| Candidate | Andrew Young | Sidney Marcus | A. Reginald Eaves |
| Party | Nonpartisan | Nonpartisan | Nonpartisan |
| First-round vote | 44,808 | 42,593 | 17,457 |
| First-round percentage | 40.92% | 38.89% | 15.94% |
| Second-round vote | 65,798 | 53,549 |
| Second-round percentage | 55.13% | 44.87% |
Mayor before election
Maynard Jackson
Democratic
Elected mayor
Andrew Young
Democratic

The 1981 Atlanta Mayoral Election took place on October 6, 1981, with the runoff held on October 27. Mayor Maynard Jackson was ineligible to run due to term limits. The runoff featured two prominent Atlanta politicians: former Congressman and United States in United Nations Ambassador Andrew Young and State Representative Sidney Marcus. Young won in the October 27th runoff by double digits. It became the first time an African American mayor of a major city (Jackson) handed over the office to an African American successor.

== Election results ==
| Candidate | General Election | | Runoff | |
| Candidate | Votes | % | Votes | % |
|---|---|---|---|---|
| Andrew Young | 44,808 | 40.9 | 65,798 | 55.1 |
| Sidney Marcus | 42,593 | 38.8 | 53,549 | 44.9 |
| A. Reginald Eaves | 17,457 | 15.9 | | |
| Warren Shulman | 3,602 | 3.2 | | |
| John E. Thompson | 618 | 0.5 | | |
| Mildred Glover | 275 | 0.2 | | |
| Andree Kahlmorgan | 151 | 0.1 | | |
| Total votes | 109,504 | 100 | 119,347 | 100 |
| Blank/Overvotes | 7,607 | – | 3,080 | – |
| Total ballots | 117,111 | 100 | 122,427 | 100 |
| Registered voters/turnout | 191,166 | 61.26 | 191,166 | 64.04 |
Source: Fulton County Board of Elections
