= Justin Howard (politician) =

American politician

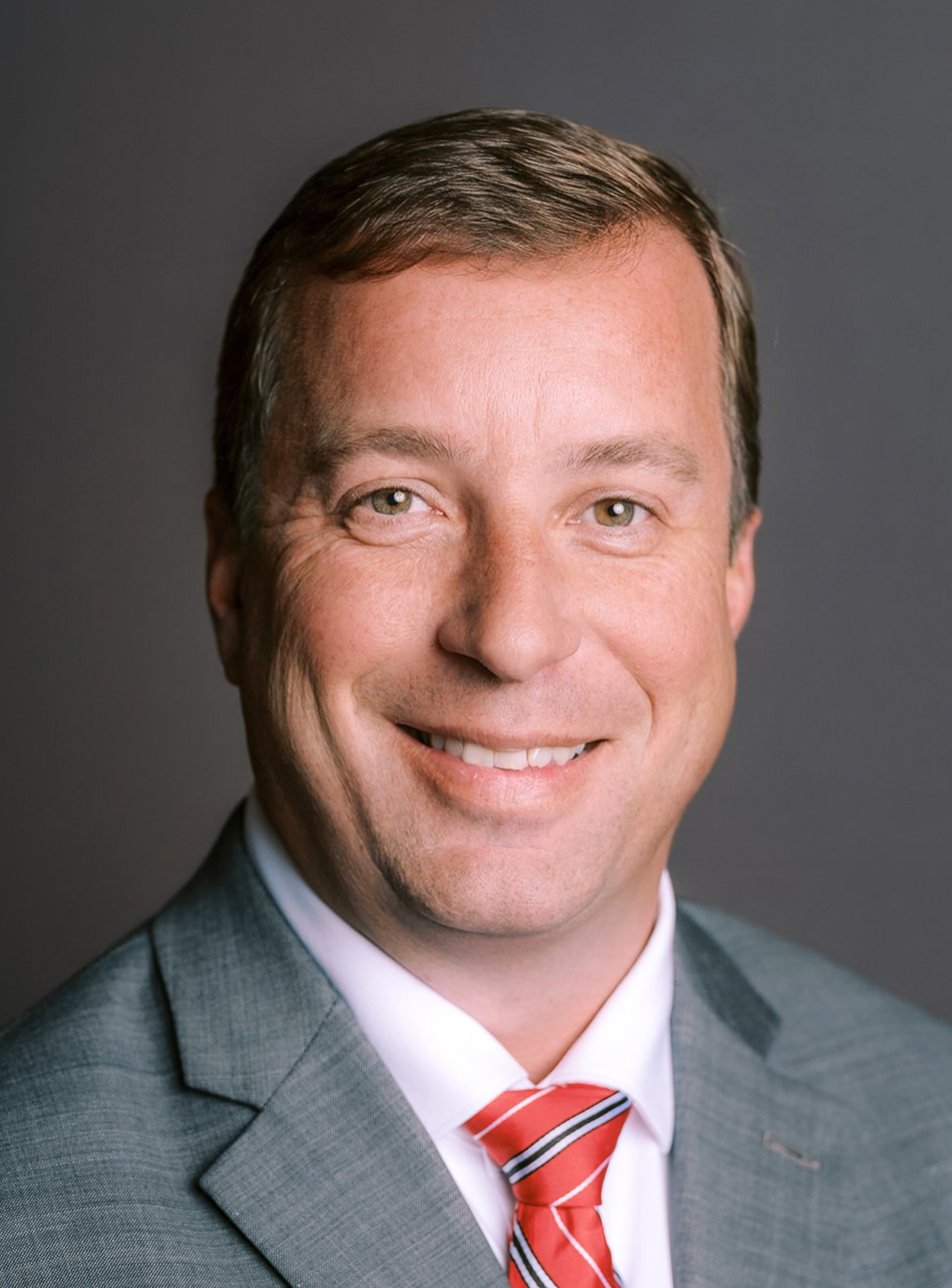

Member of the Georgia House of Representatives from the 71st district
- Incumbent
- Assumed office January 13, 2025
- Succeeded by: J. Collins

Personal details
- Party: Republican

Justin (Jutt) Howard is an American politician who was elected member of the Georgia House of Representatives for the 71st district in 2024.

Howard works in the agriculture industry.
