= Georgia's 68th House of Representatives district =

State district in Georgia, USA

Georgia's 68th State House of Representatives district
Representative
Derrick Jackson; D–Tyrone
- Demographics: 75.1% White; 17.1% Black; 4.3% Hispanic; 0.4% Asian
- Population: 56,047

District 68 elects one member of the Georgia House of Representatives. It contains parts of Fayette County and Fulton County.

== Members ==
- Dustin Hightower (until 2017)
- J. Collins (2017–2023)
- Tish Naghise (2023)
- Derrick Jackson (2023–2027)
- Timoria McQueen Saba (since 2027)
