= Tish Naghise =

American politician (died 2023)

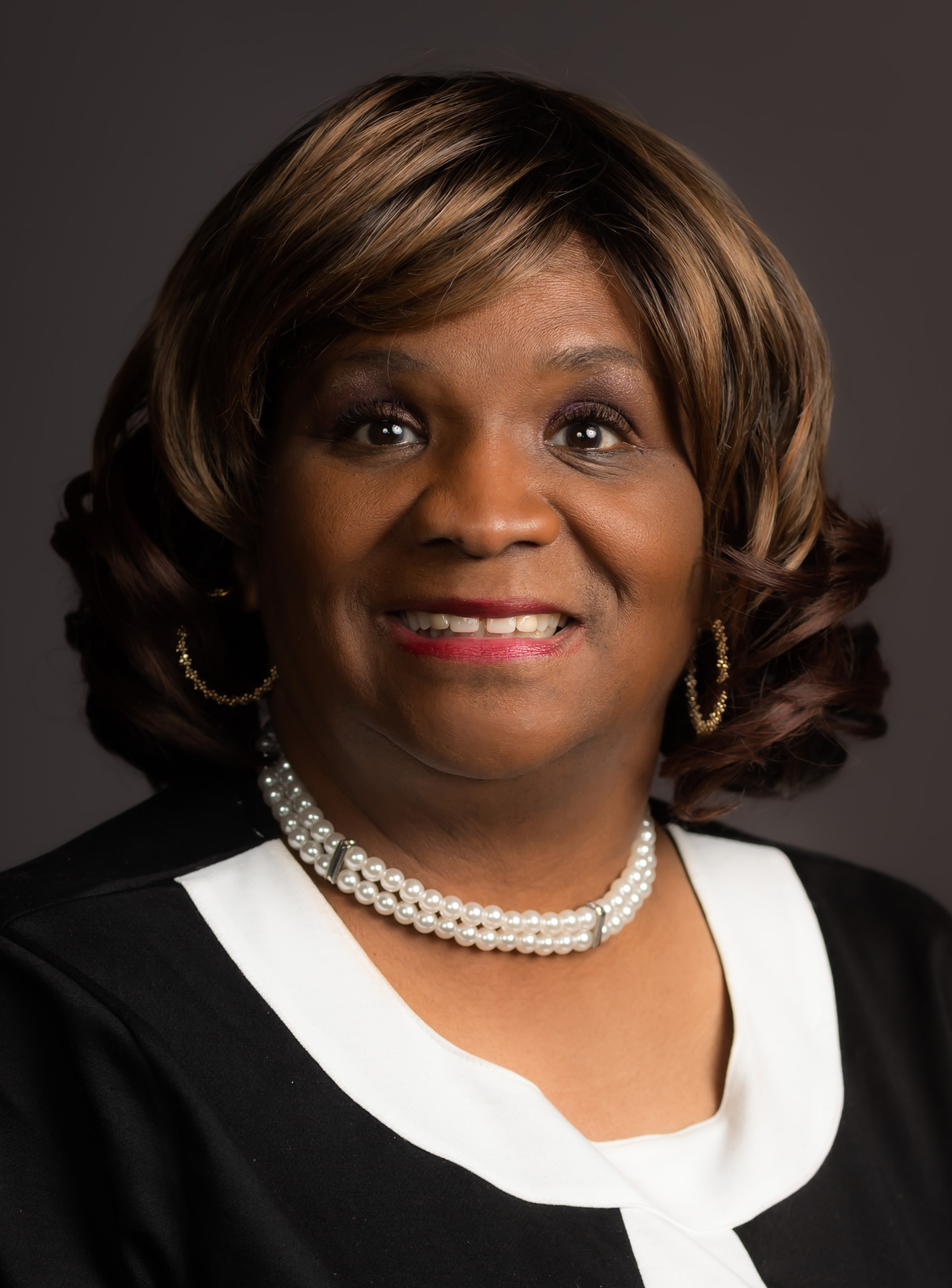

Member of the Georgia House of Representatives from the 68th district
- In office January 9, 2023 – March 8, 2023
- Preceded by: Derrick Jackson (Redistricting)
- Succeeded by: Derrick Jackson

Personal details
- Born: 1963/1964 Atlanta, Georgia, U.S.
- Died: March 8, 2023 (aged 59) Atlanta, Georgia, U.S.
- Citizenship: Nigeria; United States
- Party: Democratic
- Spouse: Charles
- Children: 2

Letitia "Tish" Lenon Naghise (1963/1964 – March 8, 2023) was an American politician of the Democratic Party. She was a member of the Georgia House of Representatives for District 68 from January 2023 until her death in March 2023. She was 59 years old at the time of her death.

== Background and education ==
Tish Naghise was born in Atlanta, and was of Nigerian descent. She earned an associate degree from Atlanta Metropolitan State College in 2006, a bachelor's degree in 2010 and a graduate degree from Clayton State University in 2022, respectively.

== Career ==
A resident of Fayetteville, Georgia, Naghise was a local team leader for Barack Obama's 2008 and 2012 presidential campaigns, a field organizer for the Democratic Party of Georgia's coordinated campaign in 2016, and a field organizer for Jon Ossoff's campaign in the 2017 Georgia's 6th congressional district special election. She was named as a delegate for Georgia to the 2020 Democratic National Convention. Prior to her election, Naghise was an engagement organizer for Georgia Conservation Voters. She had also worked as a paralegal and co-owned a trucking company. In the 2022 Georgia House of Representatives election, Naghise was elected in District 68.

== Personal life and death ==
Naghise and her husband, Charles, had two sons, one of whom predeceased her. She died at Piedmont Hospital in Atlanta on March 8, 2023, at the age of 59.

Georgia House of Representatives
Preceded by J. Collins	Member of the Georgia House of Representatives from the 68th district 2023-2023	Succeeded by Derrick Jackson
