= Derrick Jackson (politician) =

American politician (born 1966)

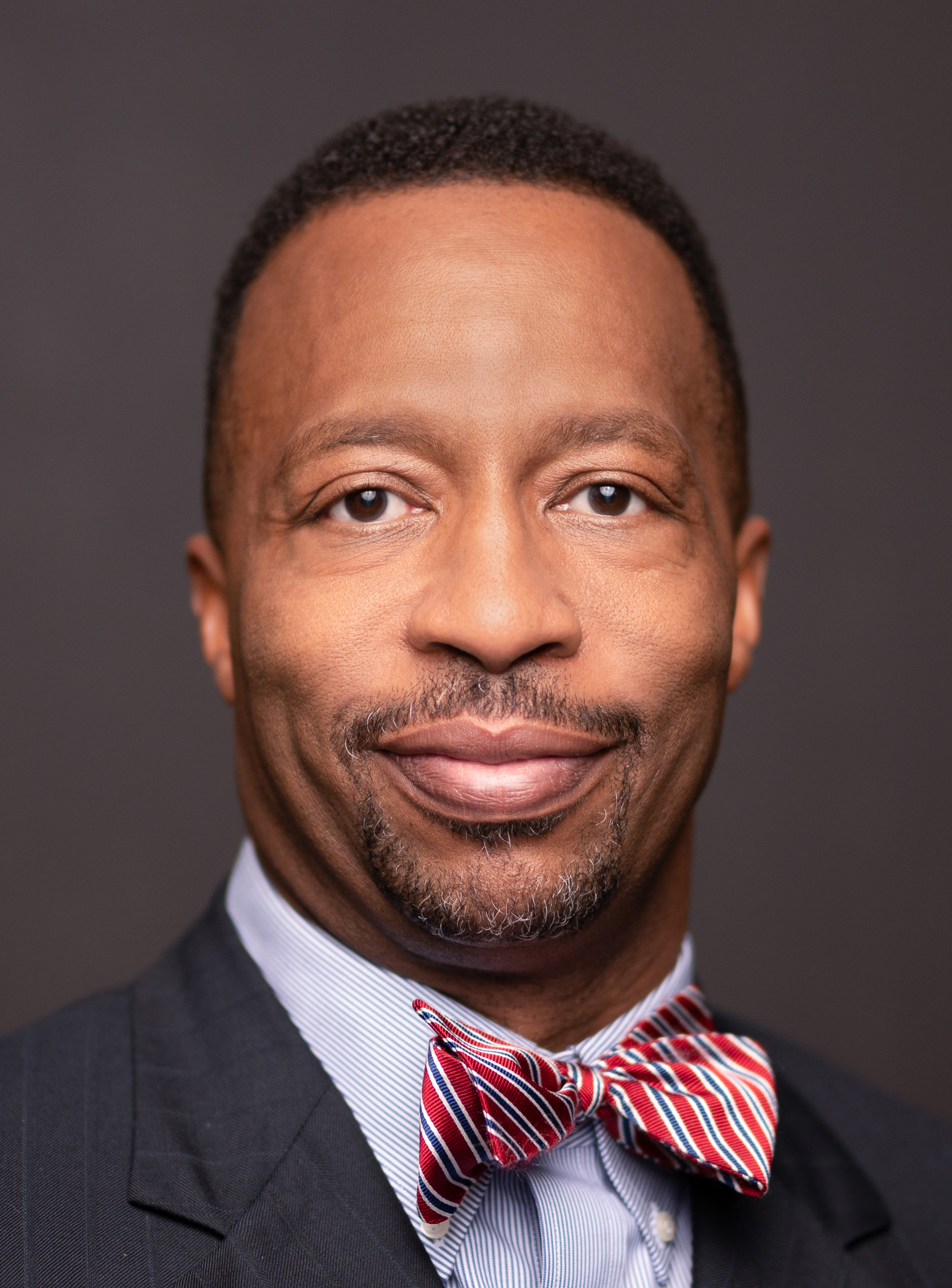
- Official portrait, 2023

Member of the Georgia House of Representatives from the 68th district
- Incumbent
- Assumed office June 29, 2023
- Preceded by: Tish Naghise

Member of the Georgia House of Representatives from the 64th district
- In office January 9, 2017 – January 9, 2023
- Preceded by: Virgil Fludd
- Succeeded by: Tish Naghise (redistricted)

Personal details
- Born: January 11, 1966 (age 60)
- Party: Democratic
- Spouse: CaMia Hopson (m. 2021)
- Education: Southern Wesleyan University; Virginia Wesleyan University (BS); Troy University (MS); Walden University
- Website: Campaign website

Derrick Lamar Jackson (born 11 January 1966) is an American politician who serves as a member of the Georgia House of Representatives representing District 68. He previously represented District 64 prior to seeking the Democratic nomination in the 2022 Georgia lieutenant gubernatorial election.

He was elected in the 2016 Georgia House of Representatives election, and did not seek re-election in 2022 due to his candidacy for the 2022 Georgia lieutenant gubernatorial election. In 2023 he was elected again to the Georgia House of Representatives in a special election to replace his successor Tish Naghise.

In June 2025, Jackson announced that he would run for governor of Georgia in the 2026 Georgia gubernatorial election. He was defeated in the Democratic primary election.
