= 2008 United States Senate election in Georgia =

- November 4, 2008 (first round); December 2, 2008 (runoff)
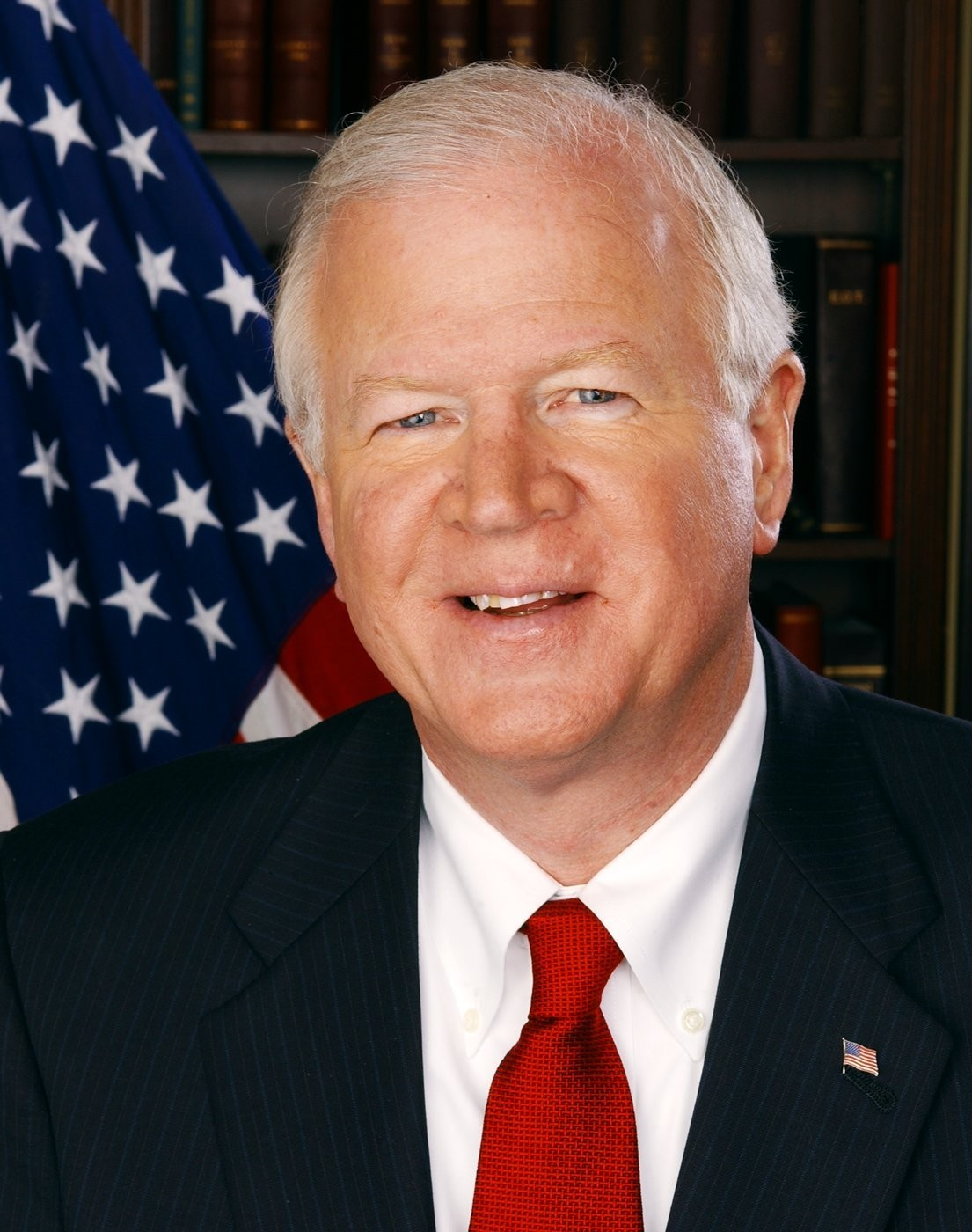

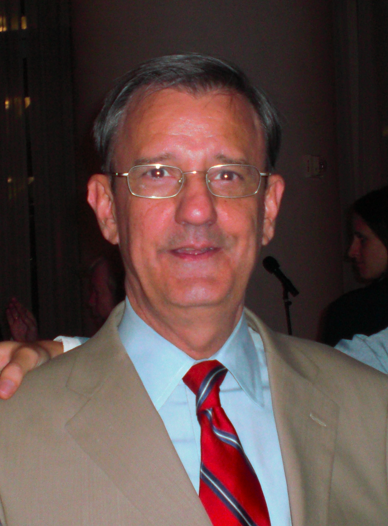
Nominee	Saxby Chambliss	Jim Martin
Party	Republican	Democratic
First round	1,867,097; 49.76%	1,757,393; 46.83%
Runoff	1,228,033; 57.44%	909,923; 42.56%
- Chambliss: 40–50% 50–60% 60–70% 70–80% 80–90% Martin: 40–50% 50–60% 60–70% 70–80% 80–90% Tie: 40–50%
U.S. Senator before election
Saxby Chambliss
Republican
Elected U.S. Senator
Saxby Chambliss
Republican

The 2008 United States Senate election in Georgia took place on November 4, 2008. The runoff election took place on December 2, 2008. Republican Senator Saxby Chambliss, first elected in 2002, sought re-election to his position as a United States senator from Georgia. He was challenged by Democratic nominee Jim Martin and Libertarian nominee Allen Buckley. After a runoff election on December 2, Chambliss was elected.

The runoff was necessary as neither Chambliss nor Martin, the two major party candidates, had won a majority of the vote in the first round. Early voting hours were set by county, and started November 17 or November 18. Prior to the runoff, advanced polls were open from November 24 to 26. Since the election was a runoff, only those voters who registered in time for the general election could cast ballots. It was the second Senate runoff election to be held in Georgia since runoffs were first mandated in 1964, following a runoff in 1992.

As of 2026, this remains the only time in history that a Republican has won re-election to Georgia's Class 2 Senate seat, and the first time that a Republican has also won re-election into a second successful full term in office. (Note: Paul Coverdell was re-elected for a second term in 1998, but died on July 18, 2000 from a cerebral hemorrhage in the second year of that term.)

== Republican primary ==
=== Candidates ===
- Saxby Chambliss, incumbent U.S. Senator

=== Results ===
2008 Georgia U.S. Senate Republican primary election
Party	Candidate	Votes	%	±%
Republican	Saxby Chambliss (incumbent)	392,902	100.0%	
Turnout		392,928	100.0%	

== Democratic primary ==
The general primary was held on July 15, 2008. A runoff between the top two Democratic contenders was held on August 5, in which Jim Martin defeated Vernon Jones.

=== Candidates ===
- Dale Cardwell, TV journalist
- Vernon Jones, businessman, DeKalb County chief executive officer and former state representative
- Rand Knight, businessman
- Josh Lanier, Vietnam War veteran and former aide to U.S. Senator Herman Talmadge
- Jim Martin, former state representative and nominee for lieutenant governor in 2006

=== Polling ===
Source	Date	Cardwell	Jones	Knight	Lanier	Martin
Strategic Vision (R)	May 9–11, 2008	20%	28%	11%	5%	15%
Insider Advantage	May 12, 2008	14%	21%	1%	5%	3%
Mellman Group (D)	May 29, 2008	7%	16%	2%	3%	21%
Strategic Vision (R)	June 27–29, 2008	22%	25%	14%	6%	17%
Insider Advantage	July 8–9, 2008	11%	20%	4%	1%	31%

=== Initial results ===
Results for the first round showed that since Jones did not win a majority of the vote, a runoff was held between him and Martin. Martin subsequently won the runoff.

2008 Georgia U.S. Senate Democratic primary election
Party	Candidate	Votes	%
Democratic	Vernon Jones	199,026	40.4%
Democratic	Jim Martin	169,635	34.4%
Democratic	Dale Cardwell	79,181	16.1%
Democratic	Rand Knight	25,667	5.2%
Democratic	Josh Lanier	19,717	4.0%
Total votes		493,226	100.0%

=== Runoff results ===
2008 Georgia U.S. Senate Democratic primary election runoff
Party	Candidate	Votes	%	±%
Democratic	Jim Martin	191,061	59.9%	+25.5%
Democratic	Vernon Jones	127,993	40.1%	−0.3%
Total votes		319,054	100.0%	

== General election ==
=== Candidates ===
==== Democratic ====
Jim Martin, a former state representative, former state human resources commissioner, Vietnam War veteran, and 2006 nominee for lieutenant governor, challenged Chambliss for his seat. He made his support for PeachCare and other social services a signature issue in the campaign.

==== Libertarian ====
Allen Buckley was an attorney, accountant, 2004 Senate nominee, and 2006 nominee for lieutenant governor. He was eliminated in the general election, but his endorsement was sought by both the Martin and Chambliss campaigns.

==== Republican ====
Sen. Saxby Chambliss, running for re-election for the first time, was a member of the Republican Party. He was elected to the House of Representatives in 1994, and had only one serious election challenge while in the House. He maintained high ratings from conservative interest groups such as the National Rifle Association of America, and the National Right to Life Committee, and correspondingly low marks from liberal interest groups such as the NAACP and ACLU. He sponsored legislation while in the Senate to replace the income tax with a national sales tax.

=== Predictions ===
Source	Ranking	As of
The Cook Political Report	Tossup	October 23, 2008
CQ Politics	Tossup	October 31, 2008
Rothenberg Political Report	Lean R	November 2, 2008
Real Clear Politics	Tossup	November 2, 2008

=== Polling ===
==== Chambliss vs. Martin ====
Source	Date	Chambliss (R)	Martin (D)
Rasmussen Reports	June 26, 2008	52%	39%
Strategic Vision	June 29, 2008	57%	28%
Rasmussen Reports	July 21, 2008	51%	40%
Rasmussen Reports	August 14, 2008	50%	44%
Survey USA	September 14–16, 2008	53%	36%
Rasmussen Reports	September 16, 2008	50%	43%
Survey USA	September 29, 2008	46%	44%
Research 2000	September 29 – October 1, 2008	45%	44%
Rasmussen Reports	October 7, 2008	50%	44%
Insider Advantage	October 9, 2008	45%	45%
Survey USA	October 12, 2008	46%	43%
Rasmussen Reports	October 22, 2008	47%	45%
Rasmussen Reports	October 30, 2008	48%	43%
Survey USA	November 2, 2008	48%	44%
Public Policy Polling	November 2, 2008	48%	46%

==== Chambliss vs. Jones (hypothetical) ====
Source	Date	Chambliss (R)	Jones (D)
Rasmussen Reports	July 21, 2008	59%	29%
Strategic Vision	June 29, 2008	57%	27%
Rasmussen Reports	June 26, 2008	57%	30%
Strategic Vision	December 12, 2007	57%	27%
Rasmussen Report	November 13, 2007	55%	32%
Rasmussen Report	September 23, 2007	53%	28%
Strategic Vision	June 24, 2007	55%	31%
Rasmussen Report	September 23, 2007	53%	28%
Strategic Vision	June 24, 2007	55%	31%
Insider Advantage	May 23, 2007	48%	31%
Strategic Vision	April 7, 2007	57%	29%

=== Results ===
As no candidate reached a majority on November 4, a runoff election was held on December 2, which Chambliss won.

2008 United States Senate general election in Georgia
Party	Candidate	Votes	%	±%
Republican	Saxby Chambliss (incumbent)	1,867,097	49.76%	−3.01%
Democratic	Jim Martin	1,757,393	46.83%	+0.93%
Libertarian	Allen Buckley	127,923	3.41%	+2.08%
Socialist Workers	Eleanor Garcia (write-in)	43	0.00%	n/a
Independent	William Salomone, Jr. (write-in)	29	0.00%	n/a
Majority		109,704	2.93%	−3.95%
Turnout		3,752,577		

== Runoff election ==
=== Candidates ===
- Chambliss (R)
- Martin (D)

=== Campaign ===
Both qualifying candidates' runoff campaigns began in earnest on November 10, when election returns made it clear that a runoff would be required. With an election date of December 2, candidates were given only three weeks for additional campaigning.

The Libertarian nominee did not endorse either candidate in the runoff, though both campaigns reportedly inquired about getting Buckley's endorsement. Major political figures such as former President Bill Clinton, Republican Senator and 2008 presidential nominee John McCain, and his former running mate Sarah Palin, campaigned in Georgia, because of the election's potential to determine whether the Democratic Party could block filibusters in the United States Senate. Historically, runoff elections in Georgia have had significantly lower turnout than have general elections.

Chambliss's campaign verified that former Republican presidential candidates John McCain and Mike Huckabee would be campaigning in Georgia on the senator's behalf, and former Democratic Governor and former U.S. Senator Zell Miller endorsed Chambliss. Former President Bill Clinton campaigned on Martin's behalf. Sarah Palin campaigned for the Chambliss campaign on December 1, the eve of the runoff election. President-elect Barack Obama had also been invited by the Democratic campaign but decided against making a stop.

The results of the runoff election were of particular interest to both parties. Subsequent to the November 4 general elections, Democrats had captured 58 seats in the Senate, two shy of a filibuster-proof supermajority. The result of Georgia's runoff election, as well as the results of an extremely close race and recount in Minnesota, would determine whether or not the required majority of 60 seats would be met. Although the Democratic nominee lost the runoff, the party would still obtain a supermajority after Pennsylvania Senator Arlen Specter switched from the Republican party to the Democratic party in April 2009 and Democrat Al Franken won in Minnesota after several recounts in June 2009.

=== Polling ===
Source	Date	Chambliss (R)	Martin (D)
Rasmussen Reports	November 18, 2008	50%	46%
Public Policy Polling	November 23, 2008	52%	46%
Public Policy Polling	November 30, 2008	53%	46%

=== Results ===
Douglas, Rockdale, Newton, McIntosh, Merriwether, Chattahoochee, Webster, and Marion counties were won by Chambliss in the runoff, after he lost them in the general. Additionally, Mitchell County went from tied to Chambliss, and Early County switched from Chambliss to Martin.

Runoff results
Party	Candidate	Votes	%	±%
Republican	Saxby Chambliss (incumbent)	1,228,033	57.44%	N/A
Democratic	Jim Martin	909,923	42.56%	N/A
Majority		318,110	14.88%	
Turnout		2,137,956		
Republican hold		Swing		

==== Counties that flipped from Democratic to Republican ====
- Ben Hill (largest city: Fitzgerald)
- Brooks (largest city: Quitman)
- Decatur (largest city: Bainbridge)
- Elbert (largest city: Elberton)
- Grady (largest city: Cairo)
- Marion (largest city: Buena Vista)
- Seminole (largest city: Donalsonville)
- Taylor (largest city: Butler)
- Chattahoochee (largest municipality: Cusseta)
- McIntosh (largest municipality: Darien)
- Meriwether (largest municipality: Manchester)
- Mitchell (largest municipality: Camilla)
- Hart (largest city: Hartwell)
- Long (largest city: Ludowici)
- Wilkes (largest city: Washington)
- Webster (largest town: Preston)

== See also ==
- 2008 United States Senate elections
