= Dale Cardwell =

American journalist (born 1962)

William Dale Cardwell (born 1962 in Greenville, Kentucky) is a consumer investigator and television journalist based in Atlanta, Georgia. In 2001, Cardwell and his family were placed in the protective custody of police when Cardwell appeared on a "hit list," based on his investigative reporting of corruption in DeKalb County, Georgia.

Cardwell is the host of TrustDaleTV, a consumer problem-solving show, airing multiple times and multiple cities per week including WANF/Peachtree TV in Atlanta, WTSP (10 Tampa Bay) in Tampa as well as CBS owned-and-operated station KTVT in Dallas/Fort Worth, Texas. Cardwell also hosts TrustDale Radio in five states and nationally on I Heart Radio. Off air, Cardwell owns and operates TrustDale.com, a venue where consumers can read recommendations for products and services across numerous "categories." Cardwell collects an advertising pool fee from each company listed with his service. Cardwell claimed to the Atlanta Journal-Constitution's Rodney Ho, "I choose the companies, they didn't choose me." Cardwell was previously a long-time investigative reporter for Atlanta's WSB-TV. Before that, he worked for Nashville, Tennessee's WSMV, WRAL-TV in Raleigh/Durham, and also served stints at TV stations in Birmingham, Alabama (at present-day WIAT) and western Kentucky.

Cardwell chose to leave conventional news reporting to mount a campaign for the United States Senate in United States Senate election in Georgia, 2008. His reported goal was "to reclaim America from the special interests that pay for and choose candidates." In support of this campaign position he chose to refuse special interest "PAC" financing. He was eliminated in the July 15, 2008 primary.
