= Georgia's 71st House of Representatives district =

State district in Georgia, USA

Georgia's 71st State House of Representatives district
Representative
Justin Howard; R–Carrollton
- Demographics: 78.0% White; 9.9% Black; 7.2% Hispanic; 2.6% Asian
- Population: 57,271

District 71 elects one member of the Georgia House of Representatives. It contains parts of Carroll County.

== Members ==
- Sidney Pope Jones Jr. (until 1993)
- Vernon Jones (1993–2001)
- David Stover (until 2019)
- Philip Singleton (2019–2023)
- J. Collins (2023–2025)
- Justin Howard (since 2025)
