= J. Collins =

American funeral director and politician from Georgia

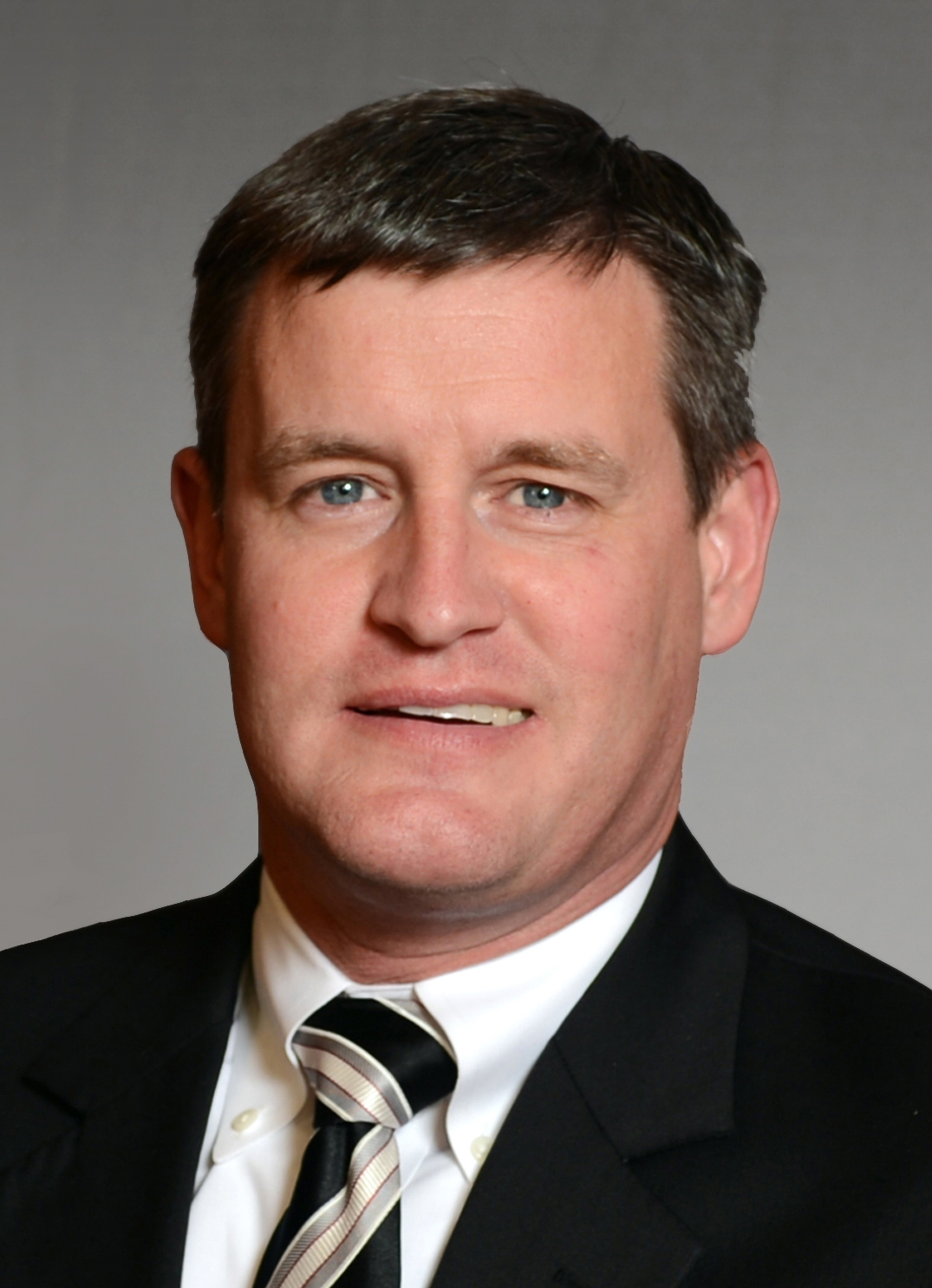

Member of the Georgia House of Representatives
- In office January 9, 2017 – January 13, 2025
- Preceded by: Dustin Hightower
- Succeeded by: Justin Howard
- Constituency: 68th district (2017–2023); 71st district (2023–2025)

Mayor of Villa Rica, Georgia
- In office 2003–2016
- Succeeded by: Mike Williamson (interim); Shirley Marchman

Personal details
- Born: James Allen Collins; September 23, 1976 (age 49)
- Party: Republican
- Spouse: Holly Reece Collins
- Children: 1
- Occupation: Funeral director, politician

James Allen Collins (born September 23, 1976) is an American politician from Georgia. Collins is the former mayor of Villa Rica, Georgia and a Republican member of the Georgia House of Representatives for District 68.

== Early life ==
Collins' parents are a school teacher and a grocer. Collins' grandfather was J. Edwin Busbin, a funeral home director. Collins attended Villa Rica Elementary School.

== Education ==
Collins attended West Georgia College. In February 2000, Collins graduated from Gupton-Jones College of Funeral Service. In September 2000, Collins received his license as a Funeral Director and Embalmers.

== Career ==
In 1997, Collins began working in funeral service. On July 1, 2002, Collins became a funeral home director and owner of J. Collins Funeral Home & Cremation Service in Villa Rica, Georgia.

In November 2003, Collins was elected as the youngest mayor of Villa Rica, Georgia. Collins served as mayor until 2016. Mike Williamson served as interim Mayor until a new mayor was elected in November 2016.

On November 8, 2016, Collins won the election unopposed and became a Republican member of Georgia House of Representatives for District 68. On November 6, 2018, as an incumbent, Collins won the election unopposed and continued serving District 68. On November 3, 2020, as an incumbent, Collins won the election unopposed and continued serving District 68. On November 8, 2022, Collins beat Democrat Afoma Eguh Okafor to represent District 71.

== Personal life ==
Collins has one child with a former wife. Collins married Holly Reece in 2021 and they live with his daughter above their funeral home in Villa Rica, GA.

Georgia House of Representatives
Preceded by Dustin Hightower	Member of the Georgia House of Representatives from the 68th district 2017–2023	Succeeded by Tish Naghise
Preceded by Philip Singleton	Member of the Georgia House of Representatives from the 71st district 2023–2025	Incumbent
