= New Energy Reform Act of 2008 =

The New Energy Reform Act of 2008 was offered by a bipartisan group of Senators in the 110th United States Congress in response to the energy policy gridlock between Republicans and Democrats. The proposal was offered as an alternative to an energy bill sponsored by House Speaker Nancy Pelosi.

House Republicans had attacked the Democratic plan for requiring that new offshore drilling take place at least 50 miles off the US Coast.

This compromise proposal differed from Pelosi's by moving the federally permitted drilling boundary to 100 miles offshore, with states given the option to set it at 50 miles. In what Washington Post calls "a key difference with Pelosi's bill" they would allow new drilling off Florida's west coast. Also unlike Pelosi's plan, the "Gang of 20" proposal allows for revenue sharing with the states.

== Background and sponsors ==
This compromise legislation was first proposed on August 1, 2008 by a bipartisan group calling themselves the "Gang of 10" as the New Energy Reform Act of 2008 or "New Era". The group was founded by Senators Saxby Chambliss (R-GA) and Kent Conrad (D-ND) as the "Gang of 10", but ten additional members have since joined the coalition, creating a "Gang of 20". This nickname is in response to the 2006 Gang of 14, of which several members in the Gang of 10 were also a part.

The original ten included five Republicans (Saxby Chambliss of Georgia (founding member), Bob Corker of Tennessee, Lindsey Graham of South Carolina, Johnny Isakson of Georgia, and John Thune of South Dakota) and five Democrats (Kent Conrad of North Dakota (founding member), Mary Landrieu of Louisiana, Blanche Lincoln of Arkansas, Ben Nelson of Nebraska, and Mark Pryor of Arkansas.) Ten additional members have since joined: five Republicans (Norm Coleman of Minnesota, Susan Collins of Maine, Elizabeth Dole of North Carolina, John Sununu of New Hampshire, and John Warner of Virginia) and five Democrats (Evan Bayh of Indiana, Tom Carper of Delaware, Tim Johnson of South Dakota, Amy Klobuchar of Minnesota, and Ken Salazar of Colorado.)

== The proposal ==
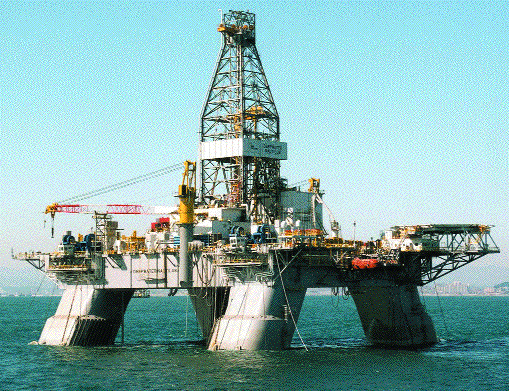
The plan would allow offshore drilling outside of a 50-mile buffer zone in the Gulf of Mexico as well as along the southeastern coast.

The Gang of 20's proposal focuses on several main components:

- Increasing access to America's domestic energy reserves by opening additional acreage in the Gulf of Mexico for leasing and giving Virginia, North Carolina, South Carolina and Georgia the option of allowing energy exploration at least 50 miles offshore.
- Enhancing conservation through a variety of tax incentives and providing a tax credit of $2,500 for the purchase of fuel efficient vehicles.
- Investing $7.5 billion in research and development to break technological barriers to alternative fuel vehicles.
- Providing $7.5 billion to help American auto manufacturers become the world's leader in making alternative fuel vehicles.
- Initiating a $7,500 tax credit for the purchase of primarily non-petroleum fueled vehicles and a tax credit of up to $2,500 for the retro-fitting of existing vehicles with advanced alternative fuel engines;
- Providing a CO_{2} sequestration credit for use in enhanced oil recovery to increase production from existing wells and reduce greenhouse gas emissions.
- Supporting nuclear energy by increasing staff at the Nuclear Regulatory Commission, providing workforce training, accelerating depreciation for nuclear plants and supporting research and development on spent fuel recycling to reduce nuclear waste.

The $84 billion New Energy Reform Act of 2008 calls for a focused effort to transition the nation's motor vehicle fleets to fuels other than gasoline and diesel. To ease gas prices in the interim, the proposal includes significant conservation provisions, consumer tax credits, and responsible measures to increase domestic production.

The plan also would require cars to become more fuel efficient and would provide research funds for improved batteries to move away from petroleum-products in cars. The proposal calls for 85 percent of vehicles to run on non-petroleum-based fuel in 20 years.

The bill would open new areas in the Eastern Gulf of Mexico and Southeast Atlantic to oil and gas drilling, while raising taxes on the major oil companies. Oil companies would be allowed to drill outside of a 50-mile buffer zone off the beaches of Virginia, the Carolinas and Georgia — if those states agree. To pay for their proposal, the Gang of 10 would raise the major oil companies' taxes by excluding them from tax credits that apply to other manufacturers.

The Senate has come to a screeching halt. But the Gang of 10 has reached a potential breakthrough. This bill would do more to lower [gasoline] prices at the pump than any other plan.

— Mary Landrieu, member of the Gang of 10 (D-LA)

== Reaction and criticism ==
From Sen. Harry Reid (D-NV) as reported by Fox News:

This proposal includes some very good ideas to address our country's many energy-related challenges, and while I do not agree with every part of it, I very much appreciate the bipartisan spirit in which it was constructed. ... I am hopeful this plan can begin to break the current legislative stalemate on the Senate floor. The American people deserve a real debate with productive Senate action on bipartisan proposals to help make energy more abundant, secure and affordable for America's families and businesses.

The response from Florida, however, has been mixed at best. "I compliment the group for coming together in a bipartisan way to try to address the current energy crisis. Unfortunately, the proposal would eliminate Florida's 2006 Gulf protections and give Floridians absolutely no voice in determining where exploration could occur," said Sen. Mel Martinez (R-FL). Martinez's Democratic colleague, Florida Senator Bill Nelson, has vowed to filibuster the proposal or any other legislation that would open the waters off Florida's western beach resorts.

Both Pelosi's proposal and this $84 billion compromise are strongly opposed by many Republicans, including John McCain, described in Sept 12's Guardian as "the plan's biggest opponent." McCain and many others consider the plan too expensive. Furthermore, McCain has made ending restrictions on offshore drilling a centerpiece of his election campaign.

"I'd call it 40% tax increase, 10% energy and 50% snake oil" said Bob Schaffer (R-CO), 2008 Senate candidate. Wall Street Journal columnist Kimberley Strassel explains,

Republicans like Mr. Schaffer had successfully turned this summer's political debate into a fight over domestic energy exploration, putting antidrilling Democrats on defense. Or at least that was the scene until the 'Gang' – five Republicans and five Democrats – announced a lackluster 'drilling' deal that may provide the left the cover it needs to defuse the energy issue.

Rush Limbaugh's voiced a similar objection:

And so, last Friday, in stumbled Sens. Lindsey Graham, John Thune, Saxby Chambliss, Bob Corker and Johnny Isakson — alongside five Senate Democrats. This 'Gang of 10' announced a 'sweeping' and 'bipartisan' energy plan to break Washington's energy 'stalemate.' What they did was throw every vulnerable Democrat, and Mr. Obama, a life preserver.

Others questioned the motivation of the proposal's Republican sponsors. "The package could prove difficult to resist for Republicans in tight reelection races. Nearly every potentially vulnerable Senate Republican, from Coleman to Elizabeth Dole of North Carolina and John Sununu of New Hampshire, has signed on to the legislation" according to the Minneapolis Star Tribune. Nine of the twenty sponsors (Pryor, Landrieu, Johnson, Chambliss, Collins, Coleman, Sununu, and Graham) are up for re-election this fall.

All 10 Republican co-sponsors had earlier pledged their allegiance to Grover Norquist and the Americans for Tax Reform, by signing his anti-tax pledge. Norquist says their participation in this effort violates the terms of that promise because the legislation would increase taxes on oil companies.
