= Manuel's Tavern =

American historic tavern

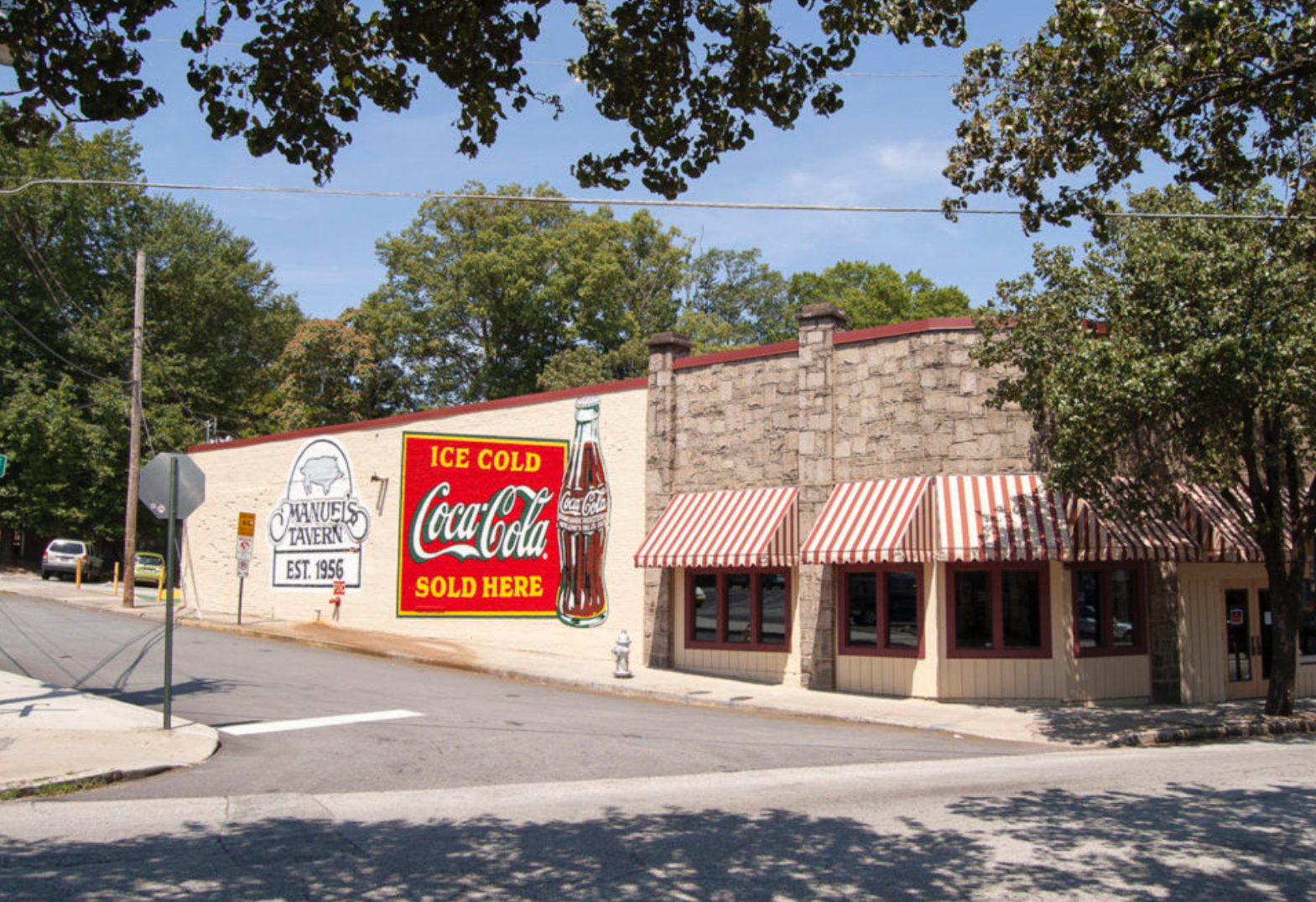
- Manuel's Tavern (2020)
- Interactive map of Manuel's Tavern

Restaurant information
- Established: 1956
- Owner: Brian Maloof
- Previous owner: Manuel Maloof
- Location: 602 North Highland Ave NE, Atlanta, Georgia, 30307, United States
- Coordinates: 33°46′14.8872″N 84°21′9.828″W
- Website: manuelstavern.com

- Manuel's Tavern
- U.S. National Register of Historic Places
- Built: c. 1922
- NRHP reference No.: 100005253
- Added to NRHP: May 29, 2020

Manuel's Tavern is a historic tavern in the Poncey–Highland district of Atlanta, Georgia. Established by Manuel Maloof in 1956, the location is notable as a meeting place for influential people in the Democratic Party. It was added to the National Register of Historic Places in 2020.

== History ==
Manuel's Tavern was established in 1956 by Manuel Maloof. The building itself is a commercial building from around 1922. To encourage discussions between patrons, Maloof banned live music and jukeboxes in the establishment.

The bar is notable as a venue and meeting place for members of the Democratic Party. In 1970, Jimmy Carter announced his gubernatorial campaign in the bar. In 2015, President Barack Obama visited the bar during a visit to Atlanta, playing a game of darts at the location. Maloof himself was politically active, being elected to the DeKalb County Board of commissioners in 1974.

In the 1980s, two additional locations were opened on Memorial Drive and near Norcross, Georgia, though both locations closed within a short time. In 1984, the tavern hosted a stage production of As You Like It, leading to what would eventually become Shakespeare Tavern, a prominent playhouse and acting group in Atlanta. In 2015, Brian Maloof, son of Manuel Maloof, sold the bar to developers. The bar closed in December of that year for extensive renovations, with the bar reopening in July the next year. In 2017, plans were unveiled by Manuel's grandson for a spin-off eatery in Grant Park, called Manny's Grant Park Pub. On May 29, 2020, the tavern was added to the National Register of Historic Places.

In November 2020, during the COVID-19 pandemic, Maloof announced that the tavern was experiencing financial difficulties and could possibly close by the end of the year. Following this, a GoFundMe was set up with a goal of raising $75,000 for the tavern. This goal was met within the first 24 hours, and within several days had raised over $180,000 for the tavern.

== See also ==
- National Register of Historic Places listings in Fulton County, Georgia
