= Saxby Chambliss =

American politician (born 1943)

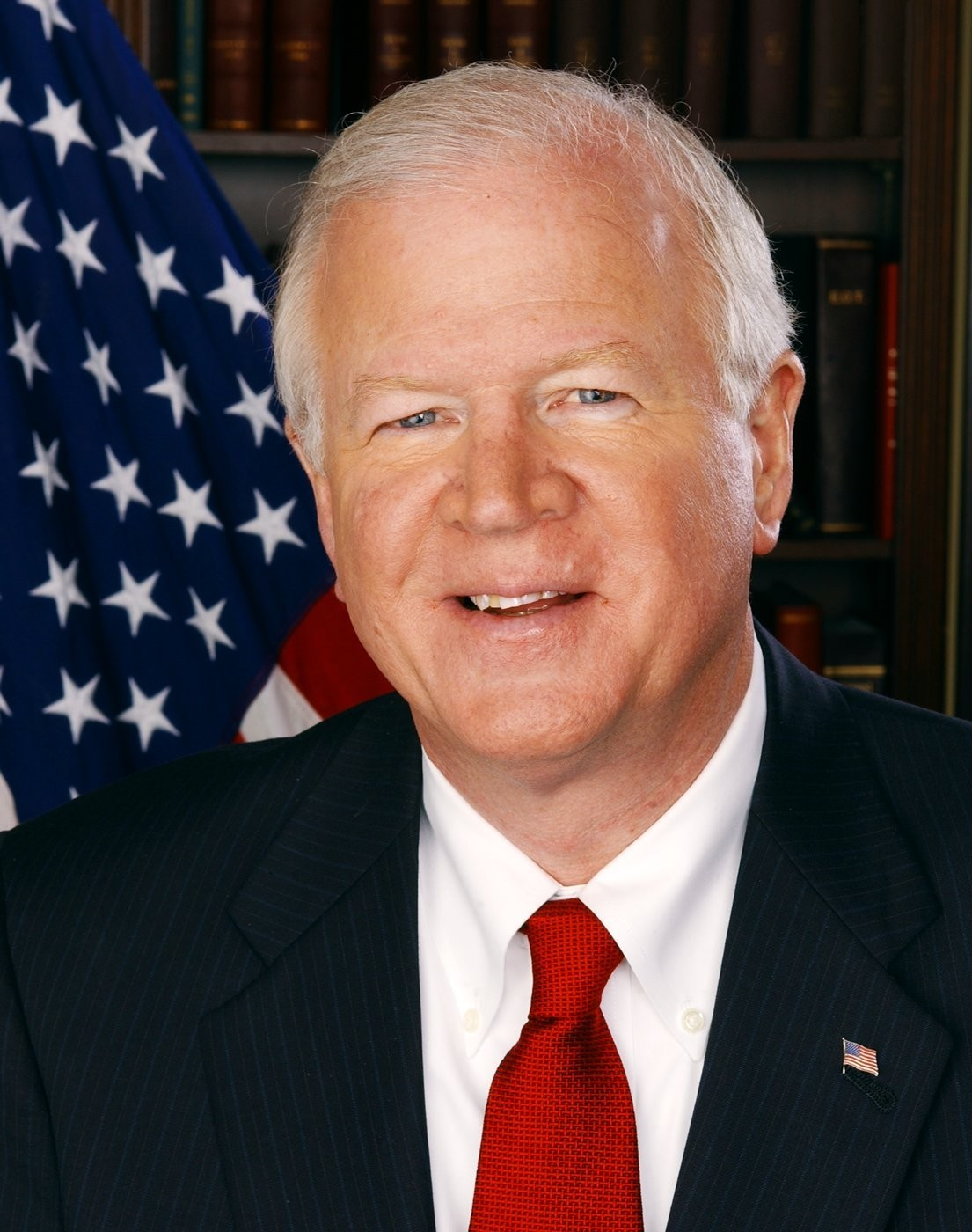

Chair of the Senate Agriculture Committee
- In office January 3, 2005 – January 3, 2007
- Preceded by: Thad Cochran
- Succeeded by: Tom Harkin

United States Senator from Georgia
- In office January 3, 2003 – January 3, 2015
- Preceded by: Max Cleland
- Succeeded by: David Perdue

Member of the U.S. House of Representatives from Georgia's 8th district
- In office January 3, 1995 – January 3, 2003
- Preceded by: Roy Rowland
- Succeeded by: Jim Marshall (redistricted)

Personal details
- Born: Clarence Saxby Chambliss; November 10, 1943 (age 83) Warrenton, North Carolina, U.S.
- Party: Republican
- Spouse: Julianne Frohbert (m. 1966)
- Children: 2
- Education: Louisiana Tech University (attended); University of Georgia (BBA); University of Tennessee (JD)
- Chambliss's voice Chambliss discusses the 2009 Southeastern United States floods. Recorded September 24, 2009

Clarence Saxby Chambliss (/ˈsæksbi ˈtʃæmblɪs/; born November 10, 1943) is an American lawyer and retired politician who was a United States senator from Georgia from 2003 to 2015. A member of the Republican Party, he previously served as a U.S. representative from 1995 to 2003.

During his House tenure, Chambliss chaired the House Intelligence Subcommittee on Terrorism and Homeland Security. This subcommittee oversaw investigations of the intelligence community following the September 11 attacks in 2001.

Chambliss was first elected to the U.S. Senate in 2002, defeating Democratic incumbent Max Cleland. As a senator, he chaired the Senate Committee on Agriculture, Nutrition and Forestry during the 109th Congress (2005–2007). During the 112th Congress (2011–2012), he was the ranking Republican on the Senate Select Committee on Intelligence. In December 2011, the Washington Post named Chambliss as one of the Best Leaders of 2011 for his attempts to craft a bipartisan deficit reduction package. Chambliss was re-elected to the Senate in 2008, but did not seek reelection in 2014.

== Early life and education ==
Chambliss was born in Warrenton, North Carolina, the son of Emma Baker (née Anderson) and Alfred Parker Chambliss Jr., an Episcopal priest. He graduated from C.E. Byrd High School in Shreveport, Louisiana, in 1961. He attended Louisiana Tech University from 1961 to 1962 and earned a Bachelor of Business Administration from the University of Georgia’s Terry College of Business in 1966, working his way through college at a bakery in Athens. He received his Juris Doctor from the University of Tennessee College of Law in 1968. He is a member of the Sigma Chi fraternity.

During the Vietnam War, Chambliss received student deferments and was also given a medical deferment (1-Y) for bad knees due to a football injury.

== U.S. House of Representatives ==
Chambliss was elected to the U.S. House of Representatives in 1994 as one of the new conservative Republican congressmen whose elections caused the party to gain a majority in both houses of Congress. A long-time Congressman and fellow Georgian, Newt Gingrich, was the leader of the movement, and Chambliss and the other Republicans elected that year are known as the Class of '94.

Chambliss was elected from the Macon-based 8th District, after six-term incumbent J. Roy Rowland retired. He was elected with 63% of the vote—an unexpectedly large margin since the 8th had never elected a Republican. He faced a tough re-election fight in 1996 against Macon attorney Jim Wiggins, but breezed to reelection in 1998 and 2000. In the latter contest, he faced a reasonably well-financed challenger in former Macon mayor Jim Marshall, but turned back this challenge fairly easily with almost 59 percent of the vote.

During his four terms in the House, Chambliss served on the United States House of Representatives Permanent Select Committee on Intelligence and chaired the House Intelligence Subcommittee on Terrorism and Homeland Security.

Less than a month after the September 11, 2001, terrorist attacks, the House Intelligence Subcommittee on Terrorism and Homeland Security, which Chambliss chaired, investigated intelligence issues related to the attacks. The committee's investigation resulted in the first comprehensive report detailing critical shortfalls within the United States intelligence community's performance and technological capabilities.

Chambliss was criticized for remarks he made during a November 19, 2001 meeting with first responders in Valdosta, Georgia, where he said that homeland security would be improved by turning the sheriff loose to "arrest every Muslim that crosses the state line." Chambliss apologized for the remarks.

In 2006, Chambliss was among several congressional Republicans and Democrats who returned campaign donations from Jack Abramoff.

== U.S. Senate ==
=== Elections ===
==== 2002 ====
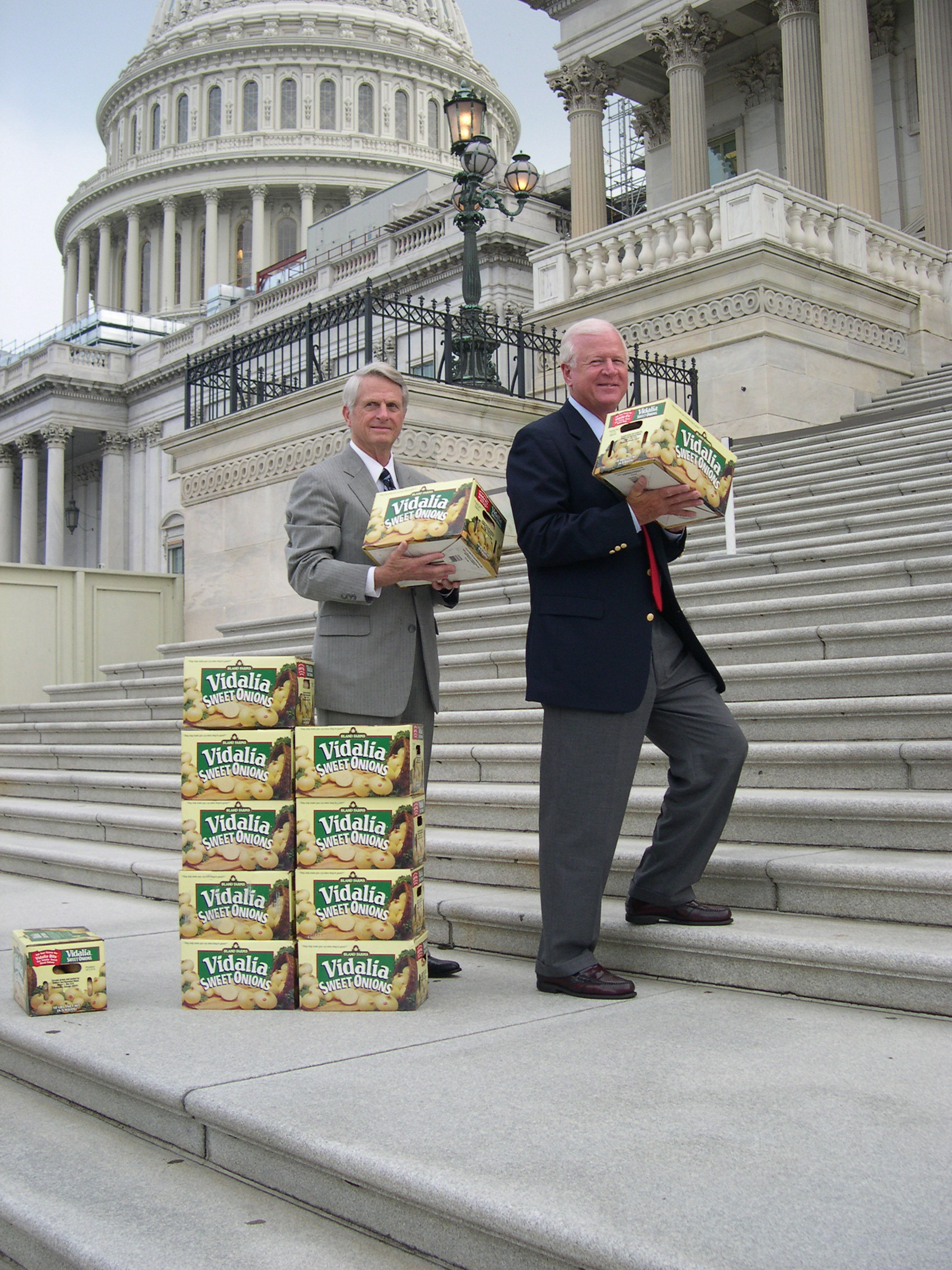
Chambliss with Zell Miller in 2004

Upon urging from Karl Rove and the Bush administration who viewed the Democratic party of Georgia as vulnerable, Chambliss ran for the Senate in 2002, facing freshman Democratic incumbent Max Cleland. During the campaign, Chambliss ran an advertisement against Cleland, a decorated Vietnam War veteran who lost three limbs during the war, in which Cleland was described as weak on defense and homeland security. Chambliss received criticism from Democrats and Republicans for this advertisement. Republican Sens. John McCain and Chuck Hagel complained to the Republican National Committee about the advertisement, and it was taken down.

Chambliss won the election, receiving 53 percent of the votes to Cleland's 46 percent.

==== 2008 ====
On November 4, 2008, Chambliss received 49.8% of the vote, while Democratic challenger Jim Martin received 47% and Libertarian Allen Buckley received 3% of the vote.

Since no candidate exceeded 50% of the vote, a runoff election between Chambliss and Martin was held on December 2, 2008.

During the run-off period, Chambliss received a subpoena regarding the investigation of a lawsuit against Imperial Sugar that claims that Imperial "wrongfully" failed to remove hazards that caused the disaster of a Savannah-based sugar refinery that exploded on February 7, 2008. Chambliss was accused of "harassing" a former sugar company executive. In a statement, Chambliss stated that he sympathized with the families affected by the explosion and had referred the matter to Senate lawyers. When he was subpoenaed to testify in the case, Chambliss claimed "legislative immunity."

Chambliss defeated Martin 57% to 43% in the runoff election.

=== Tenure ===
Chambliss was first elected to the U.S. Senate in 2002. As a senator, he chaired the Senate Committee on Agriculture, Nutrition and Forestry during the 109th Congress (2005–2007). During the 112th Congress (2011–2013), he was the ranking Republican on the Senate Select Committee on Intelligence.

Although Chambliss had a conservative voting record, he participated in bipartisan legislation—such as the 2007 Farm Bill, the bipartisan immigration reform (led by John McCain and Ted Kennedy) in 2007 and the Emergency Economic Stabilization Act of 2008. He was also the Republican leader of the Gang of 10, a bipartisan group which worked to create a compromise surrounding the energy policy of the United States. In December 2011, the Washington Post named Chambliss as one of the Best Leaders of 2011 for his attempts to craft a bipartisan deficit reduction package.

On March 6, 2013, Chambliss was among 12 Senators invited to a private dinner hosted, and personally paid for, by President Obama at The Jefferson Hotel. That same night, Chambliss participated in Rand Paul's filibuster over the government's use of lethal drone strikes—forcing the Senate to delay the expected confirmation of John O. Brennan to lead the Central Intelligence Agency.

In April 2013, Chambliss was one of 46 senators to vote against a bill which would have expanded background checks for all firearms buyers. Chambliss voted with 40 Republicans and five Democrats to stop the passage of the bill.

Chambliss received bipartisan criticism in 2013 after discussing the "hormone level created by nature" as a possible cause of sexual assault in the military.

In January 2014, Chambliss signed an amicus brief in support of Senator Ron Johnson's legal challenge against the U.S. Office of Personnel Management's Affordable Care Act ruling.

Chambliss's son, Bo, was a registered lobbyist for the Chicago Mercantile Exchange. Bo Chambliss lobbied on commodity futures trading issues that fell under legislative jurisdiction of the Senate Agriculture Committee, of which the Senator was a member. Sen. Chambliss's office enacted a policy that prevented Bo Chambliss from lobbying the Senator or his staff.

Chambliss did not seek reelection in 2014. Days after his retirement from the Senate in 2015, it was announced he was joining DLA Piper as a partner.

==== Committee assignments ====
- Vice Chairman, Senate Select Committee on Intelligence
- Senate Armed Services Committee
  - Subcommittee on Emerging Threats and Capabilities
  - Subcommittee on Readiness and Management Support
  - Subcommittee on Personnel
- Senate Committee on Agriculture, Nutrition, and Forestry
  - Subcommittee on Commodities, Markets, Trade and Risk Management (Ranking Member)
  - Subcommittee on Jobs, Rural Economic Growth and Energy Innovation
  - Subcommittee on Conservation, Forestry and Natural Resources
- Senate Committee on Rules and Administration
- Senate Special Committee on Aging
- Commission on Security and Cooperation in Europe

== Personal life ==
Chambliss is a member of St. Mark's Anglican Church in Moultrie, Georgia. He married Julianne Frohbert in 1966 and they have two children and six grandchildren.

Chambliss suffered a minor stroke in December 2020.

== Electoral history ==
Georgia's 8th congressional district: Results 1994–2000
Year	Democratic	Votes	Pct	Republican	Votes	Pct
1994	Craig Mathis	53,408	37.3%	Saxby Chambliss	89,591	62.7%
1996	Jim Wiggins	84,506	47.44%	Saxby Chambliss (incumbent)	93,619	52.56%
1998	Ronald L. Cain	53,079	38%	Saxby Chambliss (incumbent)	87,993	62%
2000	Jim Marshall	79,051	41%	Saxby Chambliss (incumbent)	113,380	59%

Georgia Senator (Class II): 2002 results
Year	Democratic	Votes	Pct	Republican	Votes	Pct	3rd Party	Party	Votes	Pct
2002	Max Cleland (incumbent)	931,857	45.90%	Saxby Chambliss	1,071,153	52.77%	Claude "Sandy" Thomas	Libertarian	26,981	1.33%
2008	Jim Martin	1,757,393	46.83%	Saxby Chambliss (incumbent)	1,867,093	49.76%	Alan Buckley	Libertarian	127,923	3.41%

2008 Georgia U.S. Senator general election runoff
Party	Candidate	Votes	%	±%
Republican	Saxby Chambliss (incumbent)	1,228,033	57.44%	
Democratic	Jim Martin	909,923	42.56%	
Majority		318,110	14.88%	
Turnout		2,137,956		

== Recognition ==
In 2026, Chambliss was inducted as a Georgia Trustee, an honor given by the Georgia Historical Society in conjunction with the Governor of Georgia to individuals whose accomplishments and community service reflect the ideals of the founding body of Trustees, which governed the Georgia colony from 1732 to 1752.

U.S. House of Representatives
Preceded by Roy Rowland	Member of the U.S. House of Representatives from Georgia's 8th congressional district 1995–2003	Succeeded by Mac Collins
Party political offices
Preceded by Guy Millner	Republican nominee for U.S. Senator from Georgia (Class 2); 2002, 2008	Succeeded by David Perdue
U.S. Senate
Preceded by Max Cleland	U.S. Senator (Class 1) from Georgia; 2003–2015; Served alongside: Zell Miller, Johnny Isakson	Succeeded by David Perdue
Preceded by Thad Cochran	Chair of the Senate Agriculture Committee; 2005–2007	Succeeded by Tom Harkin
Preceded by Tom Harkin	Ranking Member of the Senate Agriculture Committee; 2007–2011	Succeeded by Pat Roberts
Preceded by Kit Bond	Vice Chair of the Senate Intelligence Committee; 2011–2015	Succeeded by Dianne Feinstein
U.S. order of precedence (ceremonial)
Preceded by Pat Toomey as Former U.S. Senator	Order of precedence of the United States as Former U.S. Senator	Succeeded by Gordon J. Humphrey as Former U.S. Senator
