= Shakespeare Tavern =

Elizabethan-style theater in Atlanta, Georgia, US

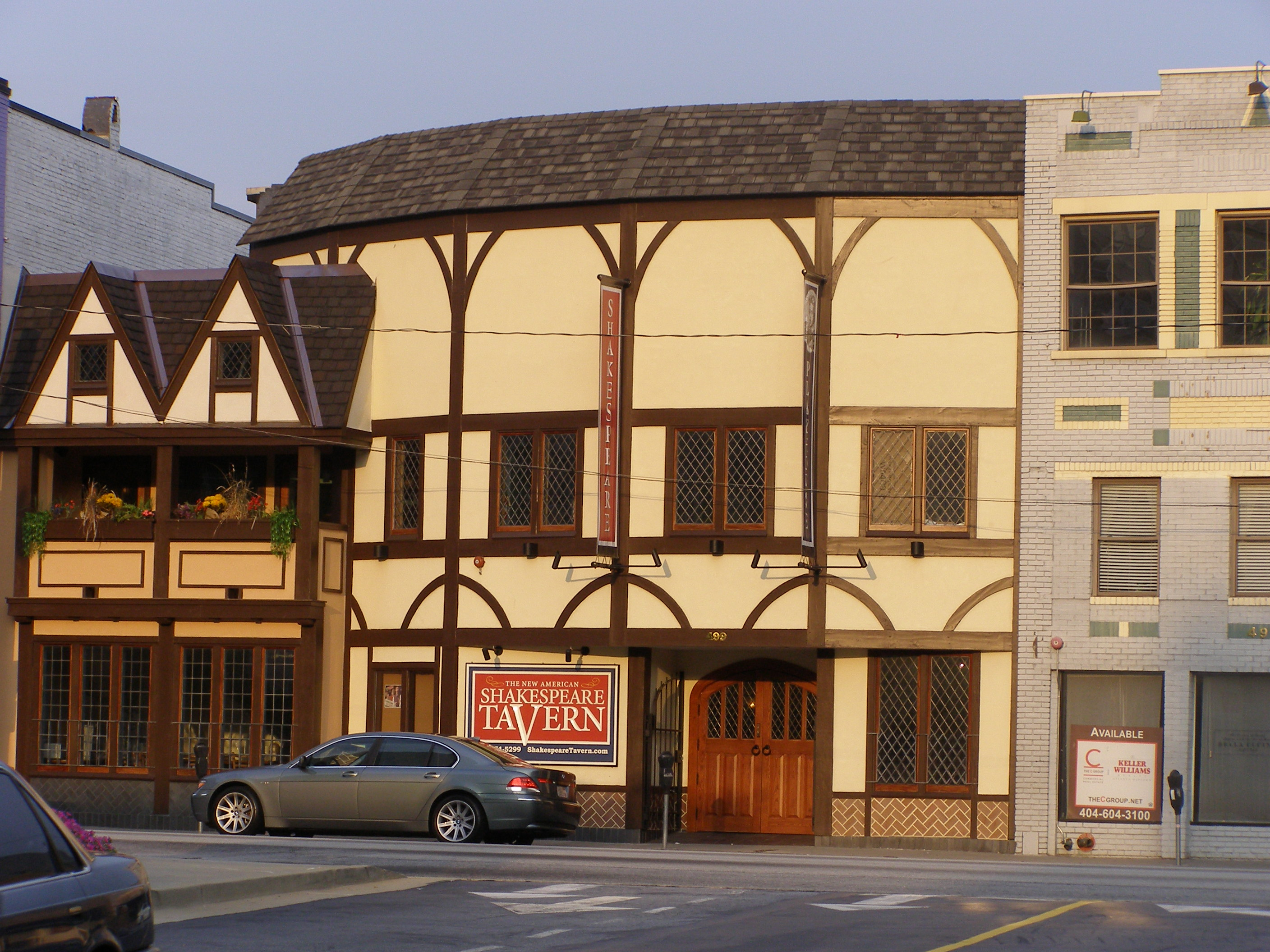
The Shakespeare Tavern Playhouse 2006 – present

The Shakespeare Tavern is an Elizabethan playhouse located in downtown Atlanta, Georgia, United States. Starting productions at Manuel's Tavern in Atlanta in 1984, the Tavern moved to 499 Peachtree Street in 1990.

The Shakespeare Tavern is home to the Atlanta Shakespeare Company, the first Shakespearean company in the United States to have performed at Shakespeare's Globe in London, England. The Shakespeare Tavern specializes in a theatrical approach called original practice, which focuses on presenting the authentic aesthetics of the Elizabethan era.

== History of the Atlanta Shakespeare Company ==
=== 1984 to 1990 ===
The Atlanta Shakespeare Company began on May 16, 1984. It began with a performance of As You Like It at Manuel's Tavern on North Highland Avenue. Over a period of six years, The Atlanta Shakespeare Company produced Romeo and Juliet, Much Ado about Nothing, A Midsummer Night's Dream, The Merchant of Venice, Twelfth Night, The Two Gentlemen of Verona, and The Taming of the Shrew in the back room at Manuel's and at the nearby Excelsior Mill, attracting national attention with articles in The Wall Street Journal, The New York Times, and also received coverage by CBS and CNN.

=== 1990 to 1999 ===
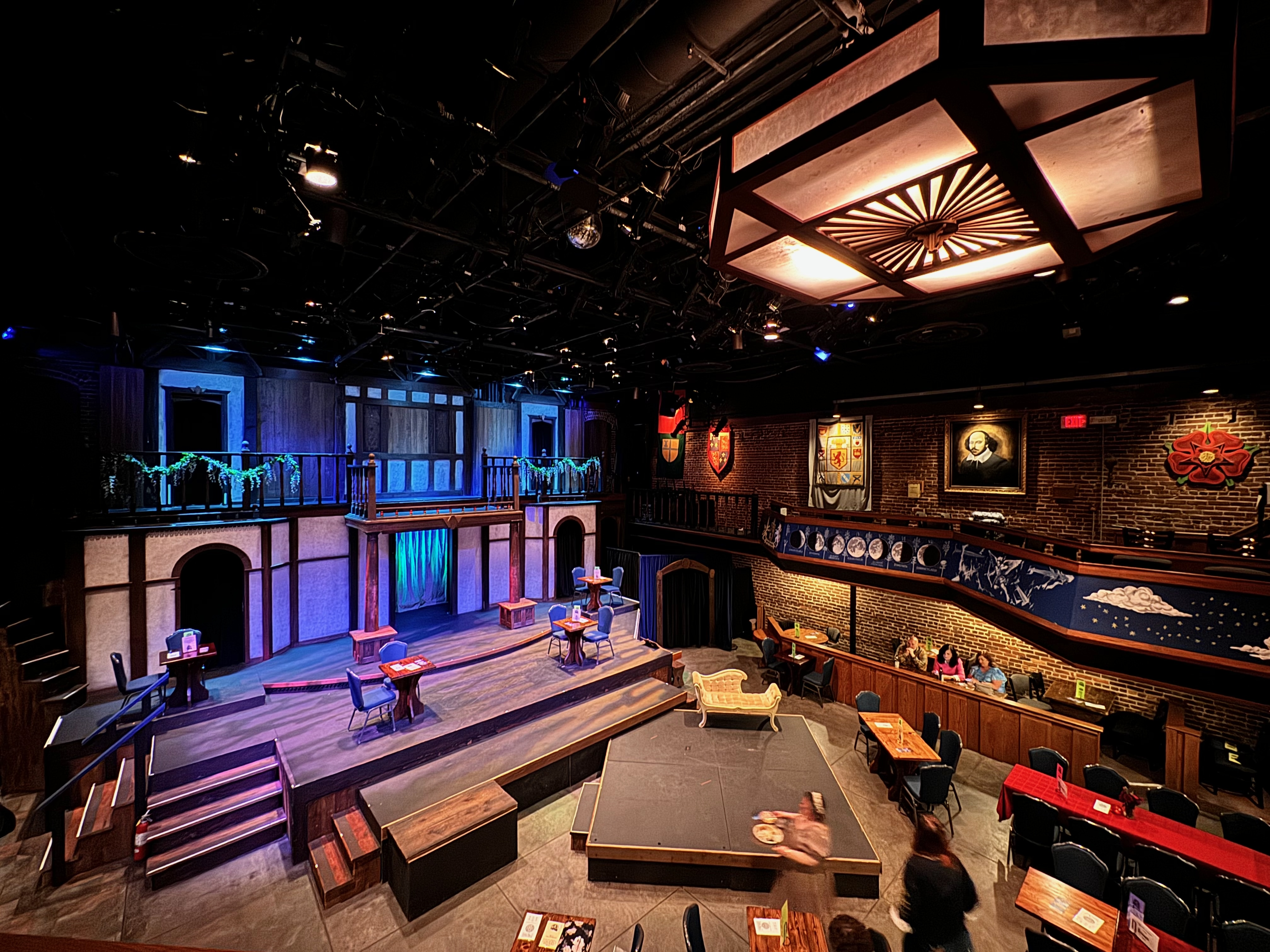
The Shakespeare Tavern stage

In 1990, the Atlanta Shakespeare Company opened the Shakespeare Tavern at 499 Peachtree Street. Since the Tavern opened, the Atlanta Shakespeare Company has produced over 73 plays, presenting 1,600 plus performances, including more than 30 Shakespeare titles and over 18 period classics by the likes of Aristophanes, Shaw, Aphra Behn, Jean Racine, Christopher Marlowe, Jean Anouilh, Ryūnosuke Akutagawa, Niccolò Machiavelli, Albert Camus, Jean Genet, Tennessee Williams, Molière, Bertolt Brecht, Jean Cocteau, and Thornton Wilder. In 1995, The Atlanta Shakespeare Company was the first American company to perform on the stage of Shakespeare's Globe in London, England.

=== 1999 to present ===
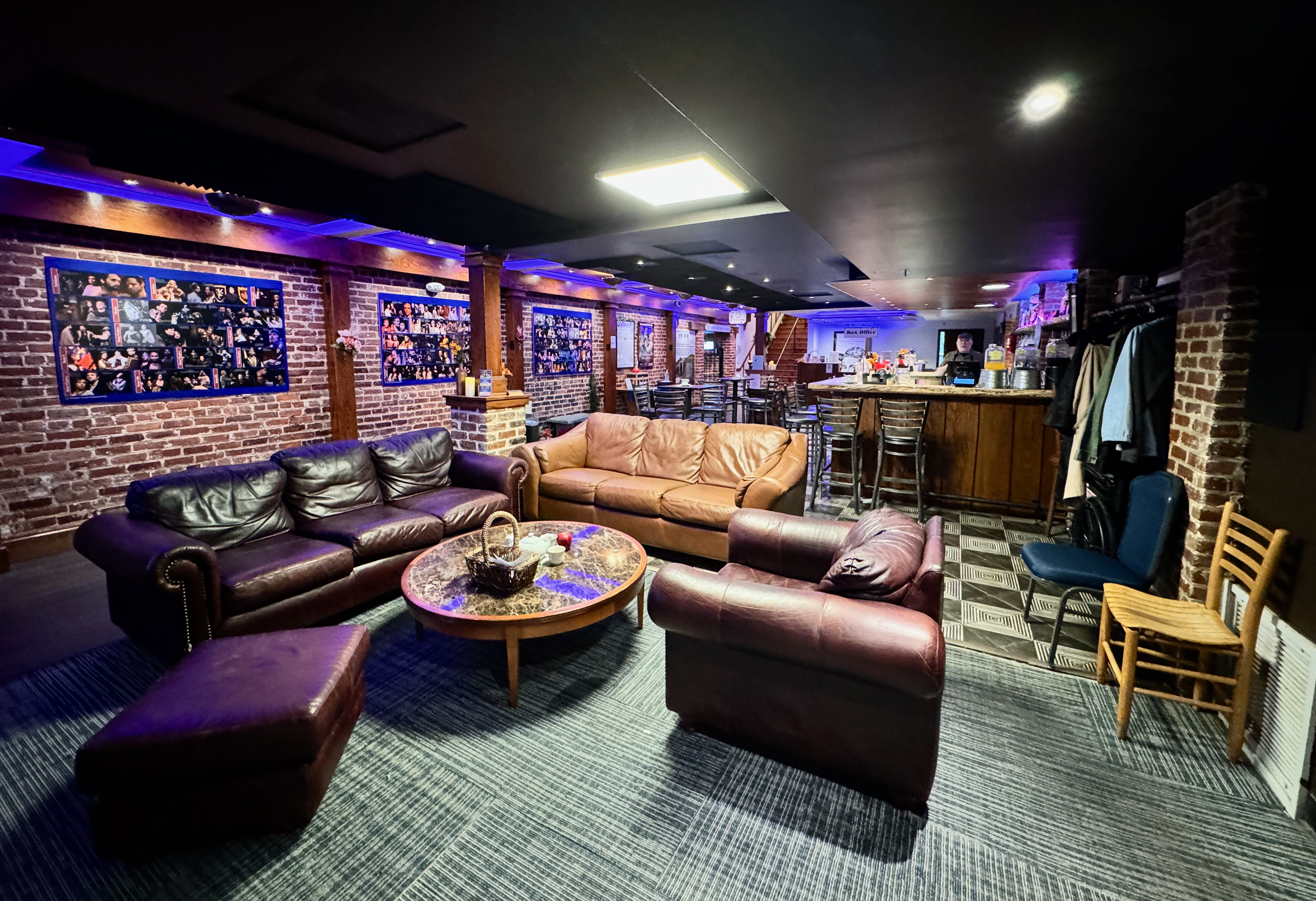
The lobby and pub

After a $1.6 million renovation and expansion, the Atlanta Shakespeare Company re-opened the Shakespeare Tavern Playhouse on October 15, 1999. Complete with a Globe-inspired balcony, the renovated Tavern created an even more active Elizabethan actor/audience dynamic. In spring 2006, after completing a $500,000 renovation, the Atlanta Shakespeare Company revealed a Globe-inspired façade, further adding to the Elizabethan feel of the Tavern.

As of 2006, the production was the only one in the United States to stay as true to the original as possible and the only one with a Globe-inspired theater. The company had performed every one of Shakespeare's plays by 2011.
