= Sidney Marcus =

American politician

Sidney J. Marcus
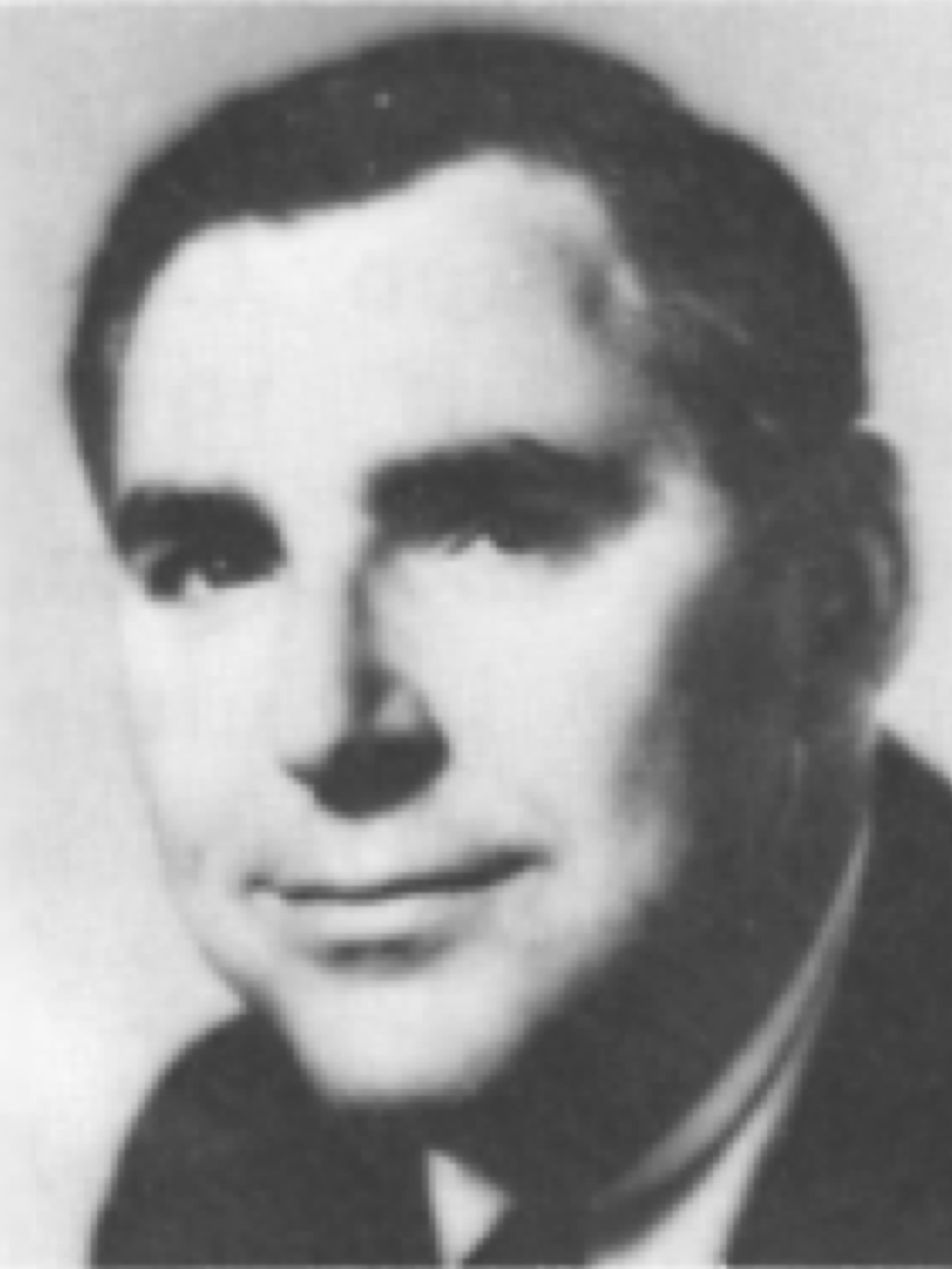
- Official portrait, circa 1975

Member of the Georgia House of Representatives from the 26th district
- In office 1972–1983

Member of the Georgia House of Representatives from the 105th district
- In office 1968–1972

Personal details
- Born: Sidney Julius Marcus; February 5, 1928 Chicago, Illinois, U.S.
- Died: October 27, 1983 (aged 55) Atlanta, Georgia, U.S.
- Party: Democratic
- Spouse: Charlotte Glyck
- Children: 3
- Education: University of Georgia (BA); Emory University School of Law (JD)

Sidney Julius Marcus (February 5, 1928 – October 27, 1983) was an American politician from Atlanta who served in the Georgia House of Representatives from 1968 until his death in 1983.

== Early life and education ==
Marcus was born February 5, 1928 in Chicago, Illinois. He attended Atlanta Public Schools and graduated from the University of Georgia in 1948, as a member of Zeta Beta Tau fraternity. He was a 1955 graduate of the Emory University School of Law. Marcus married Charlotte Glyck of Waycross, GA, and they had three children, Robyn, Bradley and Beth.

== Political career ==
He initially represented the 105th district until 1972, and represented the 26th district from 1972 onwards. He served on several committees: Health and Ecology, on which he was chairman; Ways and Means; and Rules. For several years, Marcus was chairman of the Fulton County delegation. He was also an unsuccessful candidate for mayor of Atlanta in 1981, defeated by Andrew Young. He was a noted Atlanta politician, and active in the Jewish community. His accomplishments included helping to stop the I-485 freeway which threatened several intown neighborhoods (leading to the park named in his honor).

== Monuments ==
- Sidney Marcus Boulevard, which runs 1.1 km (0.7 mi) from Piedmont Road (S.R. 237) to the Buford Highway Connector (S.R.13) in Atlanta, is named in his honor.
- Sidney Marcus Park, Cumberland Road at Cumberland Circle, Morningside, Atlanta, GA.
- Sidney Marcus Auditorium, Georgia World Congress Center
- On the Right Track, campaign show at the Fox Theatre

== Sources ==
- SIDNEY J. MARCUS PAPERS, University of Georgia
- Sidney Marcus Park
- Microsoft MapPoint North America 2004
- Daily news, October 1981
- ZBT Fraternity at U of FL
- APS Notable Graduates
- Morningside / Lenox Park Association
- Atlanta Jewish Times
