= Manuel Maloof =

American businessman and politician

Manuel Joseph Maloof (May 10, 1924–August 7, 2004) was the Chief Executive Officer and Commission Chairman of DeKalb County, Georgia, prominent Atlanta politician and owner of Manuel's Tavern, a popular Atlanta bar.

== Early life ==
Manuel Maloof was born in Atlanta, his parents were Gibran Mansour (William M) "Brown" Maloof and Lillian Shikany Maloof. He was the second of seven children. His father emigrated to the U.S. from Kafarakab, Lebanon in 1907; his mother was born in Savannah to Lebanese parents from Zahle, Lebanon. After graduating from Tech High School he served in World War II as an Army Air Forces mechanic and mess sergeant. While stationed in England he met his wife, Dolly Green.

In 1956 Maloof purchased Harry's Delicatessen on Highland Avenue, just outside DeKalb County, later transforming it to Manuel's Tavern which is still in operation.

== Tavern proprietor ==
The Atlanta Journal-Constitution describes Maloof's colorful tenure as owner of Manuel's Tavern:

In 1968-69, Paul Hemphill, a popular columnist for The Atlanta Journal, drank at Manuel's Tavern and wrote columns that made the proprietor into a local folk hero. Mr. Maloof was portrayed as a bartender-philosopher and a talented organizer of political protests. In December 1965, Mr. Maloof had organized 16 other tavern operators to successfully protest a move by the Atlanta Board of Aldermen to raise the Atlanta beer license fee from $144 to $750.

In the 1980s, the sideroom of the tavern served as the home for the theatre company of the Shakespeare Tavern before they moved to their own building in 1990.

== Political career ==
Maloof first won a seat on the DeKalb County Commission as a Democrat in 1974 after losing a previous attempt in 1972. He served on the commission until 1978. He then defeated incumbent commission chairman Walter B. Russell, Jr. in 1980. During his first term as chairman, the county changed its form of government to one headed by a chief executive officer.

In 1984 Maloof defeated Liane Levetan in the first DeKalb election for CEO. He was re-elected in 1988.

He also served as chairman of the Atlanta Regional Commission, a metro planning group, and the Association of County Commissioners of Georgia. In May 1989, DeKalb County named its six-story county administration building and its annex the Manuel J. Maloof Center for DeKalb County Governmental Administration. Maloof served as CEO until December 1992.

Maloof is known for pushing through the construction of the interstate cloverleaf known as Spaghetti Junction and for diversifying the hiring for top government positions in DeKalb. He is also remembered for his colorful and often caustic observations and actions.

Maloof, a Melkite Catholic, died in 2004. He was cremated and his ashes are in an urn over the bar at Manuel's Tavern.
