= Burrell Ellis =

American politician

Chief Executive Officer of DeKalb County
- In office January 1, 2009 – January 1, 2017
- Preceded by: Vernon Jones
- Succeeded by: Mike Thurmond

Commissioner DeKalb County, Georgia
- In office January 2001 – December 2008
- Preceded by: Ken Davis
- Succeeded by: Sharon Barnes Sutton

Personal details
- Born: November 22, 1957 (age 68) Washington, D.C., U.S.
- Party: Democratic
- Education: Wharton School; University of Texas at Austin (JD)
- Profession: Attorney
- Website: DeKalb County; Burrell Ellis

W. Burrell Ellis Jr. is an American attorney and politician who is the former political director for the ACLU of Georgia, and the former CEO of DeKalb County, Georgia.

== Early years ==
Ellis was born November 22, 1957, in Washington, D.C. and later moved to Silver Spring, Maryland.

After graduating from John F. Kennedy High School in Silver Spring, Ellis earned a degree in economics and finance from The Wharton School of the University of Pennsylvania. During his time at the University of Pennsylvania, he became a member Alpha Phi Alpha fraternity. Ellis went on to earn a Doctor of Jurisprudence degree from The University of Texas at Austin. While at the University of Texas, Ellis was elected to serve as student body president.

After graduating from law school, Ellis relocated to Atlanta, where he volunteered on several campaigns while building his law practice.

== Career in the private sector ==
Prior to becoming DeKalb County CEO, Ellis practiced law for more than 20 years, primarily in real estate development. In December 2017, Ellis joined the American Civil Liberties Union of Georgia as their political director.

== DeKalb County Board of Commissioners ==
When DeKalb County Commissioner Ken Davis made the decision to run for CEO instead of seeking re-election, Ellis decided to run to replace Davis. In the November 2000 election, Ellis defeated two challengers to serve the citizens in the commission's fourth district, and he was reelected in 2004.

During his tenure on the commission, Ellis served five terms as its presiding officer, where he led the board through its most extensive reorganization ever, ensuring openness and transparency in the legislative process. His legislative accomplishments include authoring the county's innovative Local Small Business Enterprise Ordinance and championing Georgia's first comprehensive Clean Indoor Air Ordinance to protect the health of tens of thousands of DeKalb County citizens from the dangers of second-hand smoke.

While on the commission, Ellis served as the chair of the National Association of Counties' Large Urban County Caucus, a bipartisan coalition of elected county officials that represented the interests of the nation's 100 largest metropolitan communities to Congress and the president.

== DeKalb County Chief Executive Officer ==
Ellis delivers the 2010 State of the County address.

Ellis became DeKalb County Chief Executive Officer in 2009. During his first year in office, Ellis implemented a major restructuring of government by grouping departments by function into the following operating units: development, infrastructure, public safety and administration.

In response to the impact the downturn in the economy had on county revenues, Ellis reduced spending in every office under the supervision of the CEO, and made recommendations for reductions in other county offices and agencies, as well. Despite these changes, Ellis has still faced controversies over his budgets, and has been forced to raise property taxes.

On February 22, 2011, Ellis announced that DeKalb County had cut more in spending than any other local government in the Atlanta metropolitan region since he took office.

The Atlanta Journal-Constitution (AJC) decided to put the statement to the Truth-O-Meter test. By comparing DeKalb County's budgets to other local governments, the AJC found that DeKalb County had indeed cut more than any other jurisdiction in metro Atlanta by reducing the budget by $107 million, or 17 percent. In addition, Ellis' administration absorbed more than $30 million in increased costs from 2010 to 2011.

Providing citizens a voice in county government and furthering community involvement on a grassroots level in policy decisions and operations, Ellis:

- Created a neighborhood empowerment initiative—referred to as Our Neighborhood Empowerment or ONE—to bring the government closer to its residents. ONE helps residents solve disputes at a grassroots level, volunteer for community improvement and public safety projects and work to strengthen neighborhood stabilization.
- Established the DeKalb County Code Enforcement Task Force. The task force, which includes community leaders, county officials, and other key individuals, identified and assisted in the implementation of solution-driven recommendations to address code enforcement issues affecting communities throughout DeKalb.
- Launched the Revenue Enhancement Commission (REC), in partnership with the Board of Commissioners, as an initiative to concentrate on innovative ways to identify new sources of non-tax revenue. Chaired by Commissioner Kathie Gannon, the Revenue Enhancement Commission completed a report outlining recommendations to increase non-tax revenues and continue our high level of quality government service.
- Created the Green Commission, under the leadership of Commissioner Kathie Gannon, to help fulfill DeKalb's vision of being the Greenest County in America, by developing sustainable practices and policies that enhance quality of life for all county stakeholders.

In July 2012, Ellis became president of the County Executives of America, an organization that represents nearly 700 counties in 45 states that operate under a "county executive" government structure. The organization works directly with the principal decision-makers in all areas of the federal government to ensure the concerns of counties and their citizens are addressed at the national level.

=== Corruption allegations, trial, conviction and reversal ===
Ellis faced allegations of corruption in the county's water department. While he was tried and convicted, his conviction was later reversed and was not retried.

In January 2012, DeKalb County District Attorney Robert James convened a grand jury to investigate allegations of corruption. There had been allegations of bid rigging and kickbacks involving the county and a contractor. After law enforcement performed a search of Ellis' house, the grand jury completed their report in January 2013, as Ellis began his second term. The grand jury's report remained sealed for several months. In March 2013, DeKalb County denied his request to set up a legal defense fund. On June 18, Ellis was indicted on 15 counts, 14 of them felonies, including extortion, theft by taking and several conspiracy charges. Ellis refused to resign. A state law requires the governor form an advisory committee headed by the Attorney General to determine if Ellis should be suspended and on July 15, 2013, the panel unanimously recommended that Ellis be suspended. Georgia Gov. Nathan Deal suspended Ellis and appointed Dekalb County Commissioner Lee May as interim chief executive officer.

On July 1, 2015, Ellis was found guilty of perjury and attempted theft by extortion. He was found not guilty of bribery. Seven days later, he was sentenced to eighteen months in jail and five years on probation.

In November 2016, the Supreme Court of Georgia ruled that Ellis did not get a fair trial. Ellis was not allowed to present evidence "...that could have rebutted the implication by the State that Ellis attempted to extort County vendors as a matter of practice." Because the Supreme Court could not "...say that it is highly probable that the exclusion of this evidence did not contribute to the verdict", the conviction was reversed. District Attorney Sherry Boston could have filed for a retrial, but she decided not to do so.

On April 18, 2017, the Dekalb Board of Commissioners voted to reimburse Ellis for his defense costs. The defense costs came to $1.1 million. Ellis also received $223,000 of backpay.
