= Vernon Jones =

American politician (born 1960)

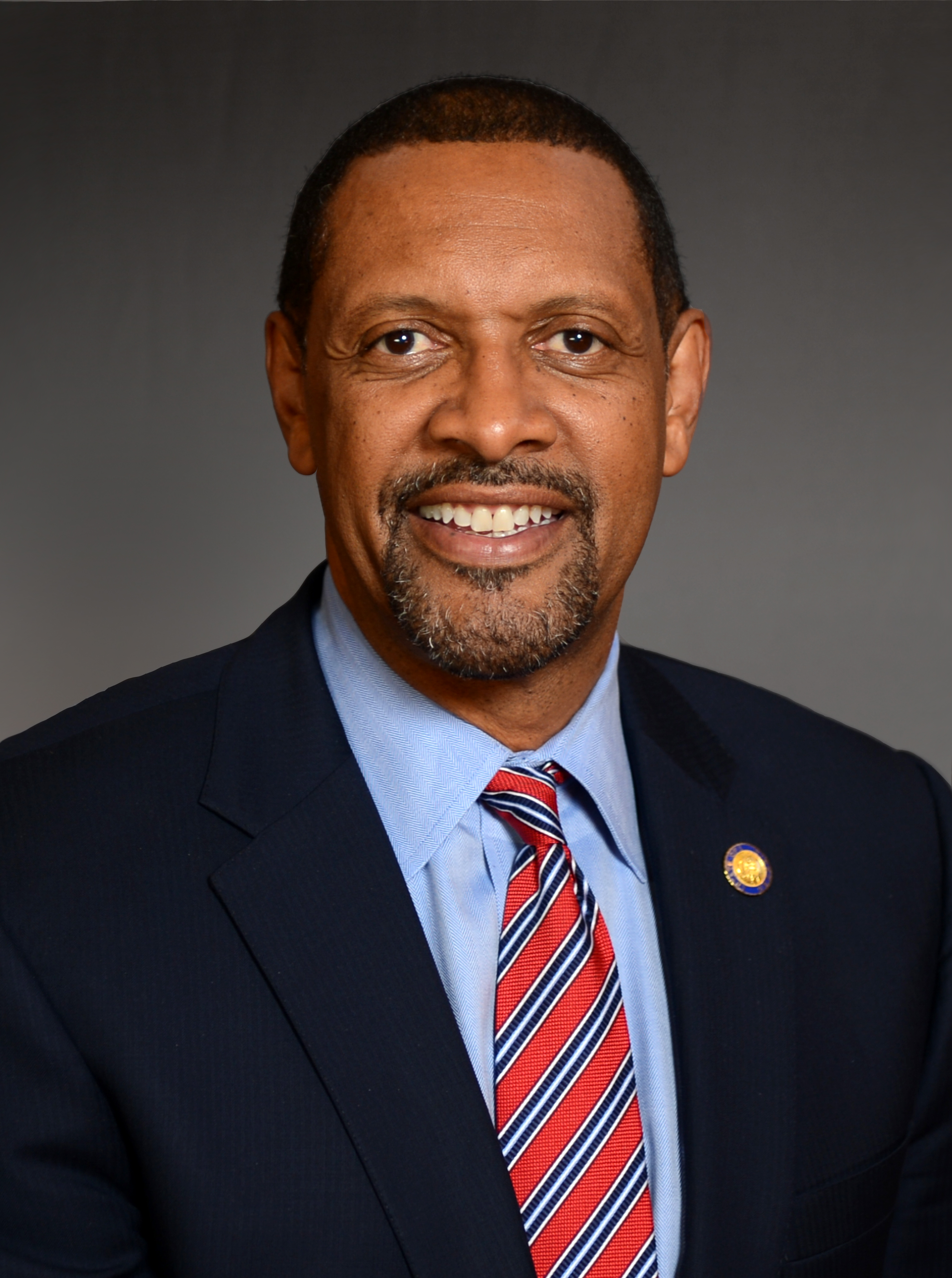
- Official portrait, 2017

Member of the Georgia House of Representatives
- In office January 9, 2017 – January 11, 2021
- Preceded by: Dee Dawkins-Haigler
- Succeeded by: Rhonda Taylor
- Constituency: 91st district
- In office January 1, 1993 – January 1, 2001
- Preceded by: Sidney Jones
- Succeeded by: Walter Ronnie Sailor Jr.
- Constituency: 71st district

Chief Executive Officer of DeKalb County
- In office January 1, 2001 – January 1, 2009
- Preceded by: Liane Levetan
- Succeeded by: Burrell Ellis

Personal details
- Born: Vernon Angus Jones; October 31, 1960 (age 66) Laurel Hill, North Carolina, U.S.
- Party: Democratic (before 2021); Republican (2021–present)
- Education: North Carolina Central University (BA)

Vernon Angus Jones (born October 31, 1960) is an American politician who served in the Georgia House of Representatives from 1993 to 2001 and from 2017 to 2021. In 2021 he switched from the Democratic Party to the Republican Party. He was a candidate to be Georgia Secretary of State in the 2026 election but was eliminated in the runoff.

Between his periods in the Georgia House of Representatives, Jones was chief executive officer of DeKalb County from 2001 to 2009. He has also run unsuccessfully for the United States Senate, United States House of Representatives, and DeKalb County Sheriff.

Jones began his political career as a Democrat, but became a Republican in 2021 after endorsing Donald Trump for re-election and speaking at the 2020 Republican National Convention. Jones initially ran for Governor of Georgia in the Republican primary against incumbent Brian Kemp in the 2022 Georgia gubernatorial election before running unsuccessfully for the U.S. House.

== Early life and business career ==
Born in Laurel Hill, North Carolina, Jones grew up on a farm in rural North Carolina. His father was a veteran of World War II who worked in a mill; his mother and siblings worked on the family farm. Jones was the fifth of six children, with four brothers and a sister. He attended North Carolina Central University in Durham, North Carolina, and became a member of the Kappa Alpha Psi fraternity there, before graduating with a B.A. in business administration in 1983. Jones also completed the John F. Kennedy School of Government's Executive Program.

Jones began his career in the telecommunications industry, first working with MCI Communications (which later became MCI Inc.) and later BellSouth Corporation. At BellSouth, he was part of a team that established wireless communications in Montevideo, Uruguay. Jones has served on the DeKalb Board of Health, the Atlanta Regional Commission, the DeKalb Library Board, the DeKalb Pension Board, and the Board of Visitors for Emory University and North Carolina Central University.

== Political career ==
=== Georgia House of Representatives ===
Jones was elected to the Georgia House of Representatives in 1992, representing Georgia's 71st House of Representatives district, succeeding Sidney Pope Jones Jr. Jones served from 1993 to 2001, during which time he was a member of the Appropriations Committee, the Insurance Committee, and the Health & Ecology Committee, as well as the Banking Committee, and a special Judiciary Committee. Jones also chaired the Chairman of the Health Professions Subcommittee. Among the proposals Jones sponsored or co-sponsored in the Georgia House was a bill to remove the Confederate battle flag emblem from Georgia State flag, and a bill that would have banned minors from purchasing music with explicit lyrics. Jones did not stand for reelection in 2000, instead running for DeKalb County CEO, and was succeeded in the Georgia House by Ron Sailor.

=== DeKalb County CEO ===
Jones was elected as chief executive officer of DeKalb County, Georgia, in 2000, winning 64% of the vote, and was re-elected in 2004 with 54% of the vote. Jones is the first African American to serve as CEO of the county. In April 2001, shortly after Jones became CEO, he voted, along with five other DeKalb County Commissioners, to offer life and health insurance benefits to the domestic partners of gay and unmarried County employees. DeKalb was the first county in Georgia to offer such benefits. During his administration, DeKalb County established the first local Homeland Security Office in 2001. He requested and received Congressional designation of Arabia Mountain as a National Heritage Area. Jones was also primarily responsible for creation of DeKalb County's first economic development department, which generated $4 billion in new investments.

However, Jones's term as DeKalb County CEO was also known for controversies and accusations of improprieties. Shortly after taking office Jones went back on his campaign pledge to keep the homestead exemption sales tax in place. He was criticized for vetoing pay raises for police officers. In January 2005, the Georgia State Ethics Commission sanctioned Jones for campaign contribution limit violations in his 2004 reelection campaign. Under a Consent Order, Jones returned all excess contributions and personally paid a $7,500 civil penalty. Jones apologized and stated that changes in campaign finance laws between the initial election and the run-off election were the reason for his acceptance of nineteen improper campaign contributions. He was initially accused of illegally using campaign funds to promote the 2005 bond referendum, but the State Ethics Commission "found no reasonable grounds" for the complaint.

=== 2008 United States Senate campaign ===
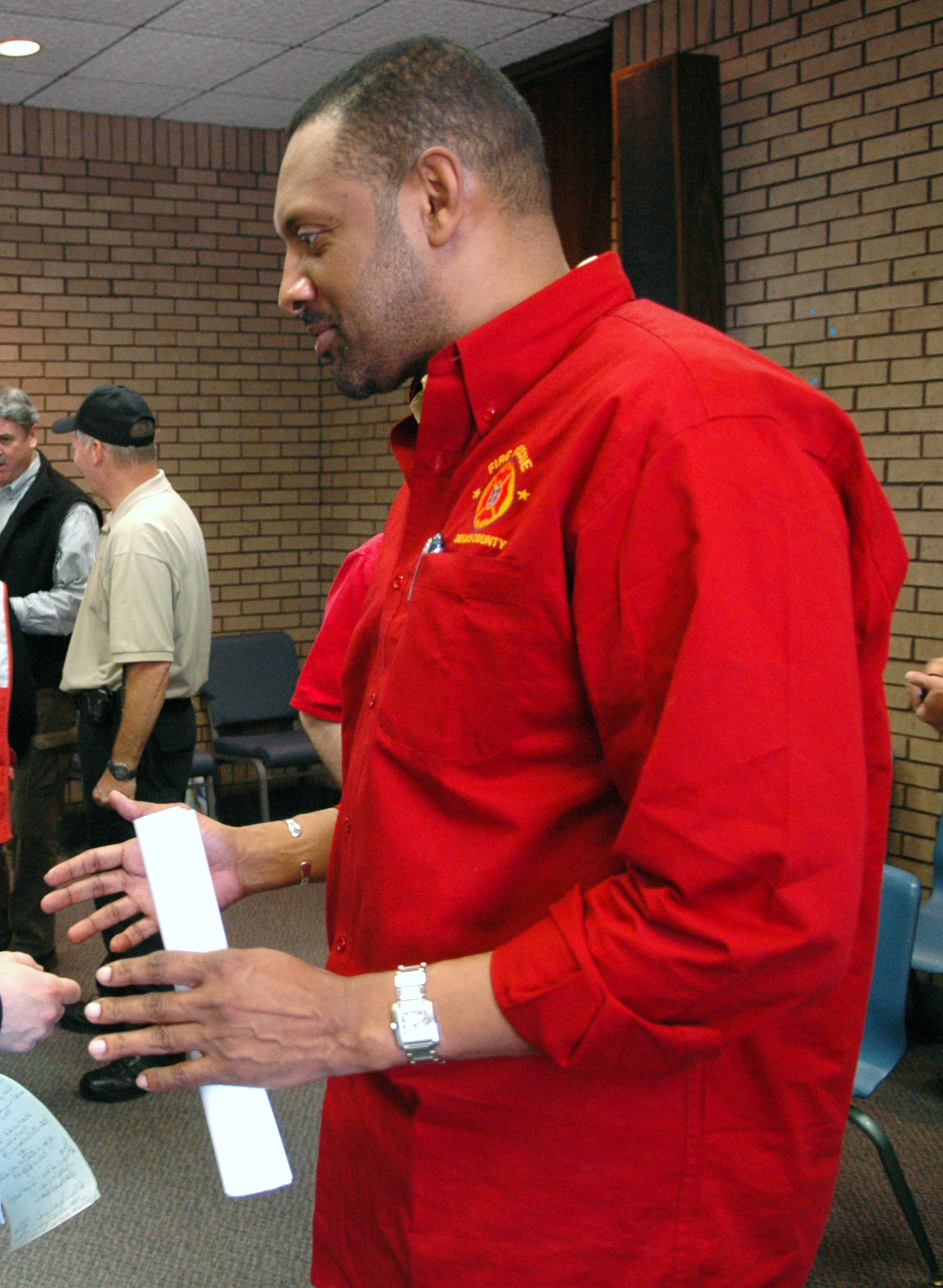
Jones in 2007

Jones ran for the U.S. Senate in 2008, but was defeated 60% to 40% in the 2008 run-off for Georgia's Democratic U.S. Senate primary.

On March 23, 2007, Jones announced he was running for the United States Senate against incumbent Republican Saxby Chambliss. Jones was criticized by his chief rival Jim Martin over his more conservative politics and past support for George W. Bush. Jones' campaign was also marred by two new controversies. Jones sent out a flier in which he appeared in a digitally altered picture next to Democratic presidential candidate Barack Obama with the words "Yes We Can." However, Obama himself stated he not only never posed with Jones, he did not endorse Jones or any other candidate for the Democratic nomination for Senate. In response, Jones blamed his "liberal opponents backed by the liberal media" for trying to ruin his campaign. Jones was also criticized for the appearance of the tagline "Vote Vernon Jones for GA Senate" on tickets, produced using county funds, for the Dekalb County Blues and Jazz Festival. The company who printed the tickets, supporters of Jones' campaign, took responsibility for the incident; saying that they were unaware campaign finance laws made such an action illegal.

In the July 15, 2008 Democratic primary election, Jones won a plurality of votes in the Democratic primary. However, Georgia law requires a majority; if no majority is reached by a candidate, the two top vote-getters must face one another in a runoff. On August 5, 2008, Jones lost the run-off election to Jim Martin by a margin of 20 points. Jones unexpectedly lost to Martin in his home base of Dekalb County. Jones had lost support within the Black community before the runoff election, and only captured two-thirds of the Black vote in the head-to-head match up against Martin. The Black turnout in the run-off was also substantially lower than the initial primary election, further hurting Jones' chances in the runoff.

2008 Georgia U.S. Senate Democratic Primary Election
Party	Candidate	Votes	%	±%
Democratic	Vernon Jones	199,026	40.4	
Democratic	Jim Martin	169,635	34.4	
Democratic	Dale Cardwell	79,181	16.1	
Democratic	Rand Knight	25,667	5.2	
Democratic	Josh Lanier	19,717	4.0	
Turnout		493,226	100.0	

2008 Georgia U.S. Senate Democratic Primary Election Runoff
Party	Candidate	Votes	%	±%
Democratic	Jim Martin	191,061	59.9	+25.5
Democratic	Vernon Jones	127,993	40.1	−0.3
Turnout		319,054	100.0	

=== Unsuccessful races ===
In 2010, Jones launched an unsuccessful campaign for the U.S. Congress in Georgia's 4th congressional district. In 2014, Jones ran unsuccessfully for Sheriff of DeKalb County, GA. He lost to incumbent Sheriff Jeff Mann, 76% to 24%.

=== Return to the Georgia House ===
In March 2016, Jones filed to run for Georgia House of Representatives, this time in House District 91, an open seat vacated by Dee Dawkins-Haigler. In the May 2016 Democratic primary election, Jones came within sixty votes of an outright victory, but was forced into a runoff election with Rhonda Taylor. Jones won the July runoff election and in November 2016, once again won election to the Georgia House, defeating Republican Carl Anuszczyk.

=== Endorsement of Donald Trump and change in party affiliation ===
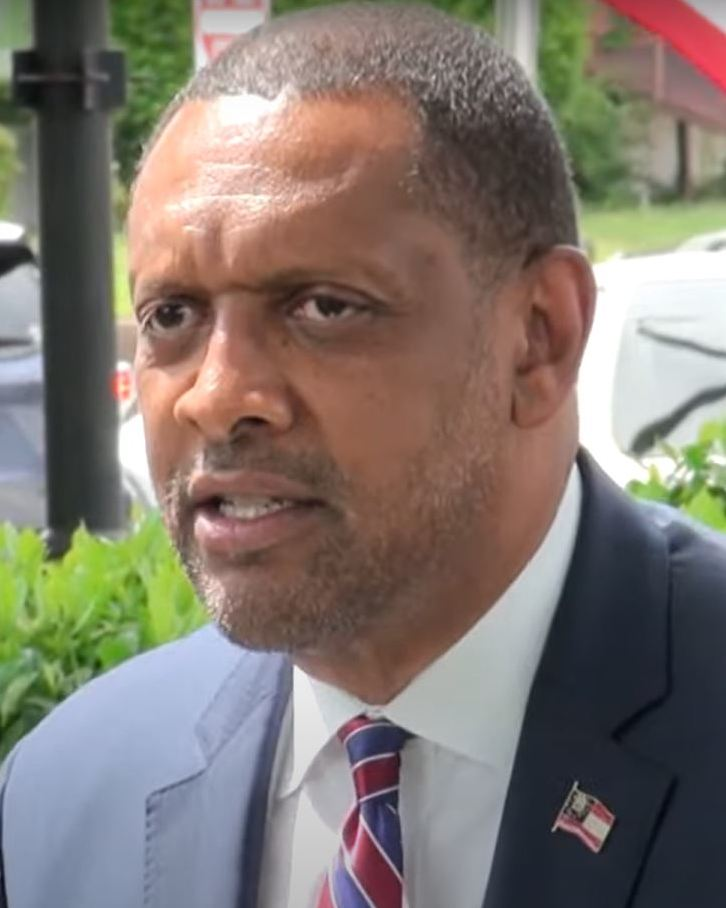
Jones in 2021

On April 14, 2020, Jones became the first state elected Democratic official in Georgia to endorse President Donald Trump's re-election bid. Jones said he had no plans to switch political parties and cited Trump's "handling of the economy, his support for historically black colleges and his criminal justice initiatives" as reasons for his endorsement. Jones was swiftly disowned by Georgia Democrats, many of whom announced support for Jones' primary challenger, Rhonda Taylor. After initially saying he would resign from the state House, Jones reversed himself and said that he would complete the rest of his term, but would not seek reelection.

Jones addressed the Republican National Convention in August 2020 and reiterated his endorsement of Trump. On October 16, 2020, Jones spoke at a Trump rally in Macon, Georgia and crowd-surfed afterwards, which drew criticism as it occurred in the middle of a pandemic with a mostly maskless crowd.

Jones promoted and perpetuated Trump's false claims of election fraud in the 2020 presidential election. Jones withdrew his bid for re-election in 2020 and his term ended on January 11, 2021. On January 6, 2021, he spoke at the rally in Washington D.C. before Trump's own speech, saying that he stands "firm for President Donald J. Trump" and announcing that he was changing his party affiliation from Democrat to Republican amid cheers from the audience; after the rally, the pro-Trump protesters stormed the United States Capitol Building.

=== 2022 Georgia gubernatorial election ===
In April 2021, Jones announced his intention to declare a run in the 2022 Georgia gubernatorial election against incumbent Republican Brian Kemp. He was joined by 107th Mayor of New York City Rudy Giuliani and 40th New York City Police Commissioner Bernard Kerik in his announcement. His announcement came after movement from Republicans to challenge Kemp in the challenge, after Donald Trump criticized Kemp for refusing to overturn the results of the 2020 presidential election in Georgia.

Jones trailed Kemp and former Senator David Perdue in the Republican primary polls. In February 2022, Jones announced that he was suspending his campaign and endorsed Perdue.

=== 2022 United States House campaign ===
After withdrawing his candidacy for governor, Jones announced he would run for the United States House of Representatives in Georgia's 10th congressional district. He entered the crowded Republican primary with the endorsement of former President Donald Trump. Jones pledged if elected, he would introduce articles of impeachment against President Joe Biden and Vice President Kamala Harris. In May 2022, Jones placed second in the primary behind trucking executive Mike Collins. Neither candidate got above 50% of the vote so the two advanced to a runoff in June 2022, which Jones lost.

2022 Georgia's 10th congressional district Republican Primary Election
Party	Candidate	Votes	%	±%
Republican	Mike Collins	28,741	25.6	
Republican	Vernon Jones	24,165	21.5	
Republican	Timothy Barr	16,007	14.3	
Republican	Paul Broun	14,901	13.3	
Republican	David Curry	19,717	9.4	
Republican	Alan Sims	7,388	6.6	
Republican	Marc McMain	5,222	4.7	
Republican	Mitchell Swan	5,184	4.6	
Turnout		112,165	100.0	

2022 Georgia's 10th congressional district Republican Primary Election Runoff
Party	Candidate	Votes	%	±%
Republican	Mike Collins	30,536	74.4	+48.8
Republican	Vernon Jones	10,469	25.5	+4.0
Turnout		41,005	100.0	

=== 2026 Georgia Secretary of State election ===
On October 13, 2025, Jones announced his campaign for Secretary of State in 2026. He finished second in the Republican Primary and lost to Tim Fleming (politician) in the June 16th runoff election.

== Political positions ==
During his 2008 Senate campaign, Jones described himself as a "conservative Democrat" who favors "tough immigration laws and fiscal responsibility" as well as "supporter of gun rights and a staunch environmental advocate". During his 2008 campaign, he stated that he opposed same-sex marriage. OnTheIssues.org rated Jones as a "Moderate Libertarian Conservative". Jones stated that he voted for George W. Bush in 2004, and supported Barack Obama in 2008. Jones donated $2,464 (~$4,480 in 2025) in two separate donations to the Georgia Republican Party in 2001. In a 2014 press release, Jones characterized himself as an "advocate for limited government, security and protections for all citizens, balanced budgeting, ethical and efficient elections, [and] job creation". Jones was the only Democratic cosponsor of the bill to legalize the concealed carry of firearms on Georgia's college campuses.

=== Abortion ===
Jones has been unclear about his position on abortion. While he was a Democratic member of the Georgia House of Representatives, he voted against Georgia House Bill 481, an anti-abortion law that sought to prevent Georgia physicians from performing an abortion beyond six weeks. He claimed at the time that he would become Speaker of the Georgia House because of the anti-abortion bill if Democrats took the House. While running for the Republican nomination for the 2022 Georgia gubernatorial election, he told the University of Georgia's College Republicans organization that he voted against HB 481 because the bill did not go far enough to protect unborn children.

=== LGBT rights ===
Jones opposes civil rights for LGBT people, having told Steve Bannon, "civil rights for Blacks, and gay rights for gays, are two different things."

== Controversies ==
=== Behavior toward women ===
According to a 2021 examination of Jones' record by the Atlanta Journal-Constitution, "Jones has a long history of problematic behavior toward women, repeatedly accused of threatening, intimidating and harassing women in his personal and professional lives" over three decades. The newspaper reviewed several previously reported episodes, as well as new details that had not previously been reported. In June 1989, three years before his election to the state legislature, Jones (who was then 28 years old) was arrested on a charge of pointing a pistol at a woman in her home in Doraville. Criminal charges were dismissed, and Jones was ordered to attend anger management classes instead.

In 2003, a community activist who complained about Jones' handling of flooding issues said that a disheveled Jones, accompanied by a plainclothes county police officer, confronted her in the evening at her home, approaching her with waving arms and clenched fists and mentioning her husband's recent death. The activist said that she felt threatened and intimidated by Jones. A prosecutor declined to charge Jones with criminal trespass, but warned Jones to stay away from the activist. The activist sued Jones for trespassing and assault; the case was settled out of court on confidential terms in 2009.

In 2004, DeKalb County Commissioner Elaine Boyer made a complaint to Decatur police that Jones "deliberately walked into her and made hard shoulder-to-shoulder contact" after a heated public meeting; she did not pursue charges against Jones, but accused him of verbally abusing commissioners and staff and making "derogatory and degrading comments."

A woman accused Jones of raping her in late December 2004 at a party at his home. Before detectives could take the statement of the woman, the police chief of DeKalb telephoned Jones to inform him of the allegation; a Georgia Attorney General's Office investigation concluded that the chief's call was inappropriate. The woman's name was later leaked to the media, and in 2005, the woman declined to press charges, citing the emotional distress that it would entail. Jones was not prosecuted, and the allegation did not cause him significant political damage.

=== Security detail expenses ===
In 2003, Jones was investigated by a grand jury for his security detail, which cost $800,000 a year. The cost of the detail far surpassed other county officials. The grand jury investigation found that Jones' five-officer protective detail was "a very expensive decoration" but not unlawful.

=== Jury finding of hostile work environment ===
In 2004, two current (Michael Bryant, John Drake) and two former (Becky Kelley, Herbert Lowe) senior employees of the Parks Department at the time filed suit against Jones (as CEO of the county), as well as three of Jones' subordinates (former parks director Marilyn Boyd Drew, his former executive assistant Richard Stogner, and Morris Williams), and DeKalb County. The plaintiffs alleged racial discrimination, or in the case of Lowe, "retaliation for refusing to assist in racial discrimination". Kelly, Bryant, and Drake were white, while Lowe was black.

The defendants moved for summary judgment on the grounds of qualified immunity. In 2006, U.S. District Judge William S. Duffey Jr. denied their motion, holding that the law does not allow "a public official defendant to engage in calculated racial discrimination costumed in a racially neutral garb of administrative actions so it can masquerade as a qualified immunity defense". On November 21, 2006, Duffey ruled that the case could go forward to a jury trial. In 2009, the U.S. Court of Appeals for the Eleventh Circuit rejected an appeal by Jones and other defendants, upholding the denial of summary judgment. Judge Gerald Bard Tjoflat, writing for the court, wrote in the ruling that DeKalb County had "embarked on a wholesale plan to replace its white county managers with African Americans" and that Jones had "devised the plan and monitored its execution".

At a jury trial in 2010, the plaintiffs' attorneys called witnesses from across county government in an attempt to demonstrate a countywide policy of discrimination. Jones denied any discrimination. Testimony revealed that during the first five years of Jones' term in office, the number of white senior county managers had dropped from 61 to 57, and the number of African-American senior county managers had risen from 33 to 61.

On April 2, 2010, the jury awarded damages to two of the four plaintiffs (to Bryant, who died before the trial, and to John Drake). The jury found DeKalb County liable for intentional discrimination. The jury found that Jones, Stogner, and Drew "created and maintained a hostile work environment"; they were ordered to pay $185,000 in damages, which was lower than the $2 million requested by plaintiffs. Jones was ordered to personally pay $27,750 in damages, which was covered by DeKalb County's liability insurance policy.

While the verdict was initially hailed as a victory for Jones, the judge later awarded the plaintiffs an additional $1.9 million in legal fees. In a post-trial settlement, DeKalb County ultimately agreed to pay the plaintiffs a total of $1.3 million for legal fees and damages.

Political offices
Preceded by Liane Levetan	Chief Executive Officer of DeKalb County; 2001–2009	Succeeded by Burrell Ellis
