= 2026 Georgia Secretary of State election =

- November 3, 2026

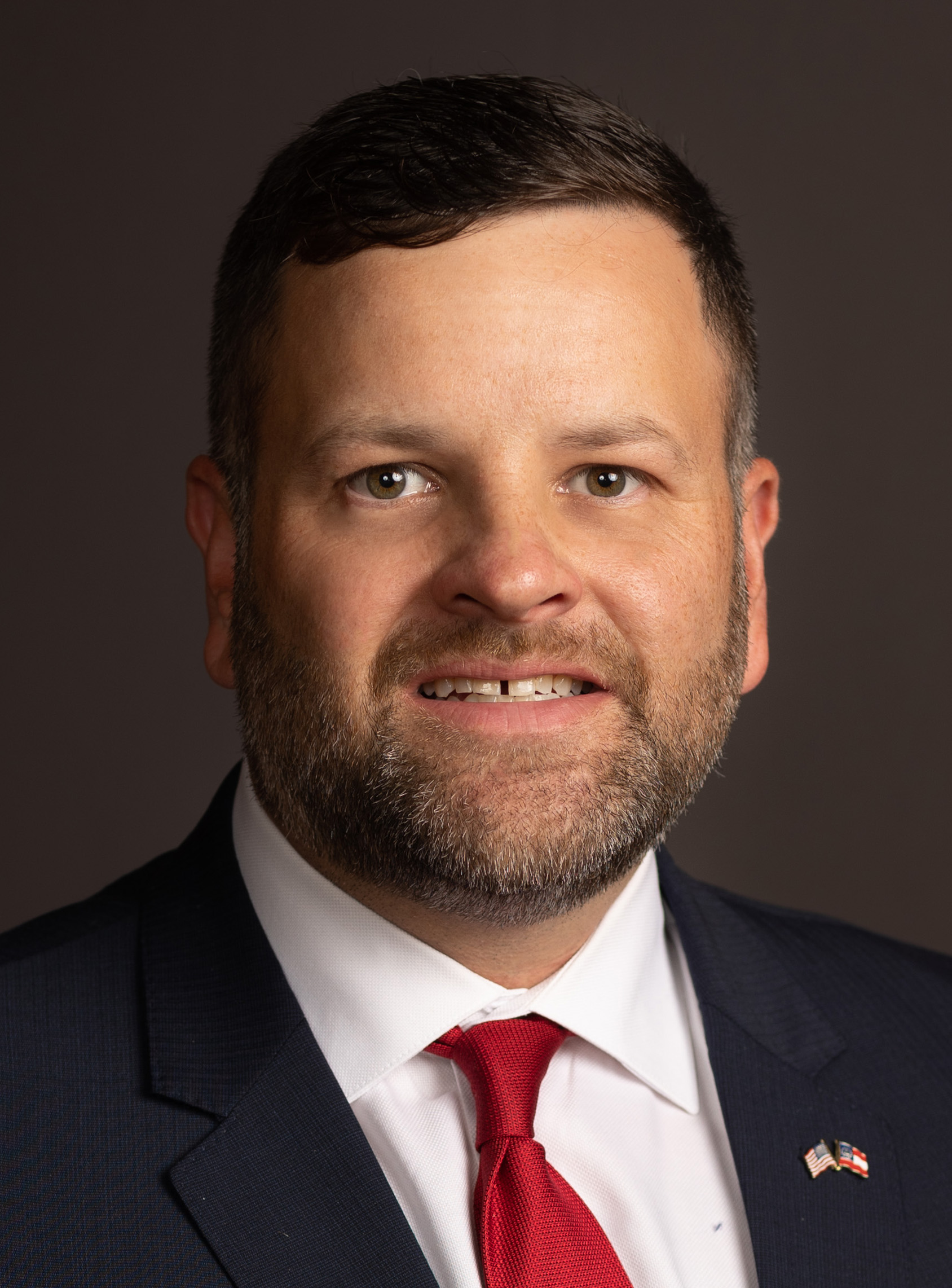
Nominee	Penny Brown Reynolds	Tim Fleming
Party	Democratic	Republican
Popular vote	2,324,667	1,847,872
Percentage	55.71%	44.29%
- Reynolds: 50–60% 60–70% 70–80% 80–90% >90% Fleming: 50–60% 60–70% 70–80% 80–90% >90%
Secretary of State before election
Brad Raffensperger
Republican
Elected Secretary of State
Penny Brown Reynolds
Democratic

The 2026 Georgia Secretary of State election was held on November 3, 2026, to elect the secretary of state of Georgia. Incumbent Republican secretary of state Brad Raffensperger decided against seeking reelection, instead choosing to run for governor. Primary elections were held on May 19, with runoff elections being held on June 16. In the general election, Democratic nominee Penny Brown Reynolds defeated Republican nominee Tim Fleming to win the office.

== Republican primary ==
=== Candidates ===
==== Nominee ====
- Tim Fleming, state representative from the 114th district (2023–present), and former chief of staff for Governor Kemp

==== Eliminated in runoff ====
- Vernon Jones, former Democratic state representative from the 91st district (1993–2001, 2017–2021), candidate for U.S. Senate in 2008, candidate for Georgia's 4th congressional district in 2010, and Republican candidate for Governor in 2022 and Georgia's 10th congressional district in 2022

==== Eliminated in primary ====
- Kelvin King, construction company owner and candidate for U.S. Senate in 2022
- Ted Metz, former chair of the Georgia Libertarian Party and Libertarian nominee for governor in 2018 and Secretary of State in 2022
- Gabriel Sterling, former chief operating officer of the Secretary of State's office

==== Declined ====
- Brad Raffensperger, Georgia Secretary of State (2019–present) (Unsuccessfully ran for governor)

=== Results ===
Primary results by county: Fleming: 30–40%; 40–50%; 50–60%; 60–70%; Jones: 30–40%; 40–50%

Republican primary
Party	Candidate	Votes	%
Republican	Tim Fleming	334,055	39.2
Republican	Vernon Jones	232,448	27.3
Republican	Kelvin King	135,795	15.9
Republican	Gabriel Sterling	101,746	12.0
Republican	Ted Metz	47,724	5.6
Total votes		851,768	100.0

=== Runoff ===
==== Results ====
Runoff results by county: Fleming: 50–60%; 60–70%; 70–80%; Jones: 50–60%; Tie: 50–60%

Republican primary runoff
Party	Candidate	Votes	%
Republican	Tim Fleming	430,455	64.5
Republican	Vernon Jones	236,920	35.5
Total votes		667,375	100.0

== Democratic primary ==
=== Candidates ===
==== Nominee ====
- Penny Brown Reynolds, former Fulton County Superior Court judge (2000–2008) and television host

==== Eliminated in runoff ====
- Dana Barrett, Fulton County commissioner (2023–present) and nominee for Georgia's 11th congressional district in 2020

==== Eliminated in primary ====
- Cam Ashling, political organizer
- Adrian Consonery Jr., voting rights advocate

=== Endorsements ===
Dana Barrett

Organizations

- 314 Action
- Fair Fight Action (endorsed in runoff)
Penny Brown Reynolds

U.S. senators

- Raphael Warnock, Georgia (2021–present) (endorsed in runoff)

Organizations

- Georgia AFL-CIO
- Georgia Conservation Voters

=== Results ===
Primary results by county: Reynolds: 30–40%; 40–50%; 50–60%; 60–70%; Barrett: 30–40%; 40–50%; Consonery: 40–50%

Democratic primary
Party	Candidate	Votes	%
Democratic	Penny Brown Reynolds	435,185	42.4
Democratic	Dana Barrett	361,997	35.2
Democratic	Cam Ashling	126,515	12.3
Democratic	Adrian Consonery Jr.	104,140	10.1
Total votes		1,027,837	100.0

=== Runoff ===
==== Results ====
Runoff results by county: Reynolds: 50–60%; 60–70%; 70–80%; 80–90%; Barrett: 50–60%; 60–70%

Democratic primary runoff
Party	Candidate	Votes	%
Democratic	Penny Brown Reynolds	242,439	63.1
Democratic	Dana Barrett	141,759	36.9
Total votes		384,198	100.0

== General election ==
=== Predictions ===
Source	Ranking	As of
Sabato's Crystal Ball	Tossup	October 29, 2026

=== Post-primary endorsements ===
Penny Brown Reynolds (D)

Organizations

- EMILYs List
- Everytown for Gun Safety
- Reproductive Freedom for All
Tim Fleming (R)

Executive Branch Officials

- Donald Trump, 45th and 47th President of the United States (2017–2021, 2025 – present)

=== Results ===
2026 Georgia Secretary of State election
Party	Candidate	Votes	%	±%
Republican	Tim Fleming			
Democratic	Penny Brown Reynolds			
Total votes			100.0	
