= 2022 Georgia Secretary of State election =

- November 8, 2022
- Turnout: 57.02% ▲
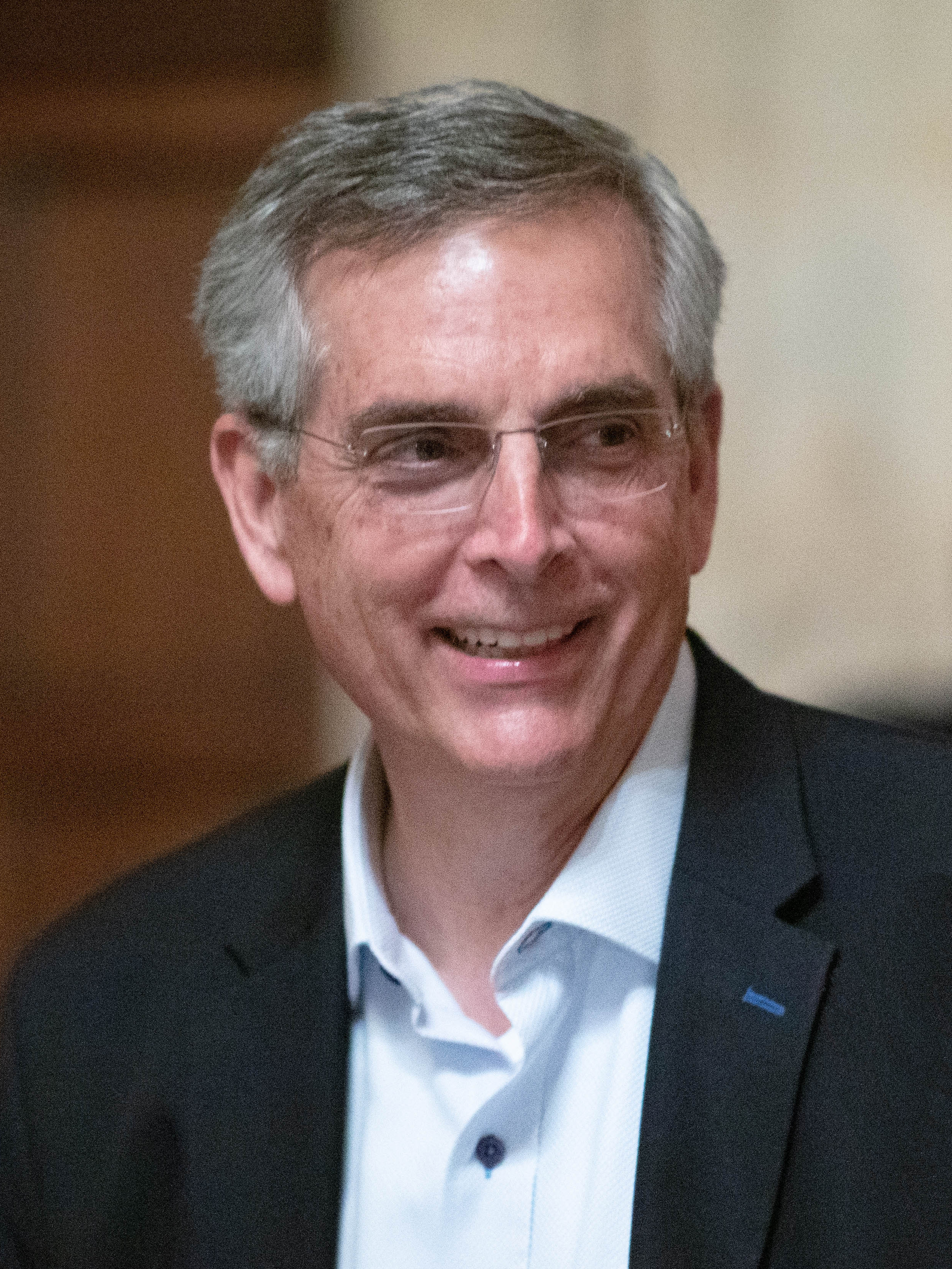

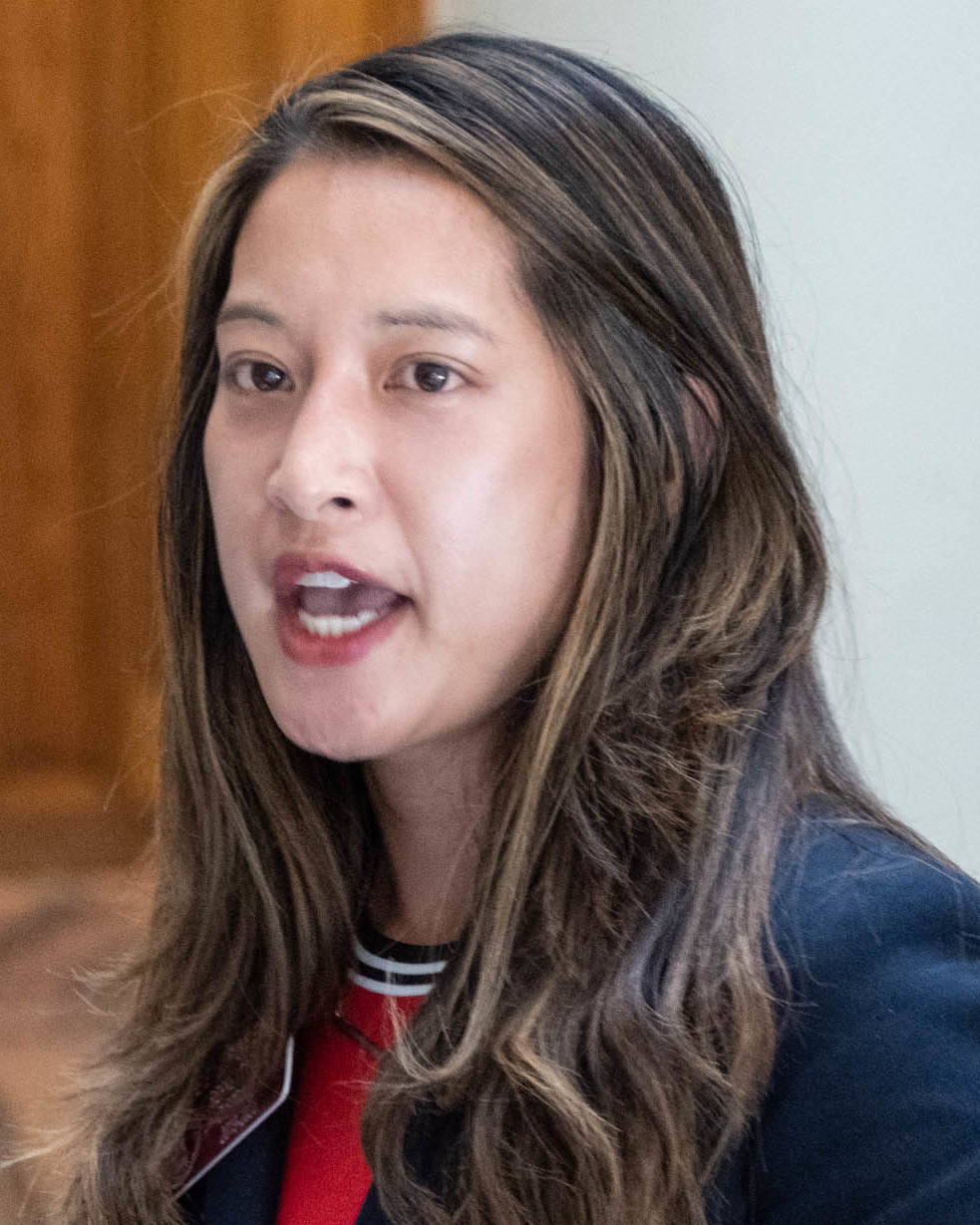
Nominee	Brad Raffensperger	Bee Nguyen
Party	Republican	Democratic
Popular vote	2,081,421	1,719,922
Percentage	53.23%	43.99%
- Raffensperger: 40–50% 50–60% 60–70% 70–80% 80–90% >90% Nguyen: 40–50% 50–60% 60–70% 70–80% 80–90% >90% No data
Secretary of State before election
Brad Raffensperger
Republican
Elected Secretary of State
Brad Raffensperger
Republican

The 2022 Georgia Secretary of State election was held on November 8, 2022, to elect the Secretary of State of Georgia. Incumbent Republican Secretary of State Brad Raffensperger won re-election to a second term. Raffensperger emerged as a major national figure in early January 2021 when he faced significant pressure from then-President Donald Trump to overturn the 2020 presidential election in Georgia. Trump had been taped in a phone call asking Raffensperger to "find 11,780 votes," the exact number needed for Trump to carry the state. The party primary elections took place on May 24, with runoffs scheduled for June 21.

Raffensperger was elected in 2018 to a first term in a runoff against Democratic former U.S. representative John Barrow, the first time in Georgia history that any statewide executive election went to a second round.

== Republican primary ==
=== Candidates ===
==== Nominee ====
- Brad Raffensperger, incumbent Secretary of State

==== Eliminated in primary ====
- Jody Hice, U.S. representative for Georgia's 10th congressional district
- TJ Hudson, former Treutlen County probate judge
- David Belle Isle, former mayor of Alpharetta and candidate for Secretary of State in 2018

=== Endorsements ===
Jody Hice

U.S. executive branch officials

- Donald Trump, 45th and later 47th president of the United States (2017–2021, 2025-present)

U.S. representatives

- Matt Gaetz, U.S. representative from Florida's 1st congressional district (2017–2024)
- Marjorie Taylor Greene, U.S. representative from Georgia's 14th congressional district (2021–2026)

Organizations

- America First Secretary of State Coalition
- American Conservative Union
- Gun Owners of America
David Belle Isle

County commissioners

- Dan Perdue, Houston County commissioner

Mayors

- Tommy Allegood, mayor of Acworth
- Keith Brady, mayor of Newnan
- Allen Brown, mayor of Hinesville
- Jimmy Burnette, mayor of Suwanee
- Danny Dunagan, mayor of Gainesville
- Steve Edwards, mayor of Sugar Hill
- Steve Fry, mayor of Williamson
- Jimmy Gilvin, mayor of Alpharetta
- Kevin Gowen, mayor of Tunnel Hill
- Alan Hallman, mayor of Hapeville
- Douglas Hollberg, mayor of Griffin
- Joe Lockwood, mayor of Milton
- Steve Miller, mayor of Holly Springs
- Robert Price, mayor of Locust Grove
- Shirley Sessions, mayor of Tybee Island
- Julie Smith, mayor of Tifton
- Jim Still, mayor of Mountain Park
- Jim Thorton, mayor of LaGrange
- Randy Toms, mayor Mayor of Warner Robins
- Mike Young, mayor of McRae-Helena

City councilors

- Jay Flowers, Thomasville city councilor
- Randal Franks, Ringgold city councilor
- Wayne Swanson, LaFayette city councilor
- Justin Wright, Centerville city councilor

=== Debates ===
2022 Georgia Secretary of State Republican primary election debates
No.	Date	Organizer	P Participant A Absent (invited) I Invited N Not invited				Source
No.	Date	Organizer	David Belle Isle	Jody Hice	T.J. Hudson	Brad Raffensperger	Source
1	May 2, 2022	Atlanta Press Club, Georgia Public Broadcasting	P	P	P	P	

=== Fundraising ===
Campaign finance reports as of April 30, 2022
Candidate	Raised	Spent	Cash on hand
Brad Raffensperger (R)	$1,683,799	$1,372,857	$310,941
Jody Hice (R)	$2,221,750	$1,781,490	$440,260
David Belle Isle (R)	$479,175	$476,319	$2,855
Source: Georgia Campaign Finance Commission

=== Polling ===
Graphical summary

Poll source	Date(s) administered	Sample size (Note: Key: A – all adults RV – registered voters LV – likely voters V – unclear)	Margin of error	David Belle Isle	Jody Hice	T.J. Hudson	Brad Raffensperger	Undecided
Landmark Communications	May 22, 2022	500 (LV)	± 4.4%	9%	39%	2%	38%	11%
SurveyUSA	April 22–27, 2022	559 (LV)	± 4.9%	4%	20%	5%	31%	40%
University of Georgia	April 10–22, 2022	886 (LV)	± 3.3%	5%	26%	4%	28%	37%
Landmark Communications	April 9–10, 2022	660 (LV)	± 3.8%	10%	35%	3%	18%	33%
University of Georgia	March 20 – April 8, 2022	~329 (LV)	± 5.4%	4%	30%	4%	23%	39%
Emerson College	April 1–3, 2022	509 (LV)	± 4.3%	6%	26%	3%	29%	37%

=== Results ===
Primary results map by county: Raffensperger: 30–40% 40–50% 50–60% 60–70%; Hice: 40–50% 50–60% 60–70% 70–80%; Hudson: 70–80%

Despite opinion polls suggesting a tight race between Brad Raffensperger and Jody Hice as well as Trump's endorsement of Hice, Raffensperger ultimately won the primary election with a 19-point margin over Hice and avoided a potential runoff by winning an outright majority of the vote. This has been attributed to Hice's insufficient name recognition across the state and crossover voting in Georgia's open primary system where some Democratic voters voted in the Republican primary to vote against "Trump-backed extremists" like Hice.

Raffensperger performed best in the Atlanta metropolitan area, while Hice performed best in Georgia's 10th congressional district, where he served as a U.S. representative; only five counties outside the district were won by Hice. The only county to not be won by either Raffensperger or Hice was Treutlen County, Hudson's home county, which he won with 76.42% of the vote.

Republican primary results
Party	Candidate	Votes	%
Republican	Brad Raffensperger (incumbent)	611,616	52.37%
Republican	Jody Hice	389,447	33.34%
Republican	David Belle Isle	103,272	8.84%
Republican	TJ Hudson	63,646	5.45%
Total votes		1,167,981	100.0%

== Democratic primary ==
=== Candidates ===
==== Nominee ====
- Bee Nguyen, state representative

==== Eliminated in runoff ====
- Dee Dawkins-Haigler, former state representative and candidate for Secretary of State in 2018

==== Eliminated in initial primary ====
- John Eaves, former chair of the Fulton County Commission and candidate for Georgia's 7th congressional district in 2020
- Floyd Griffin, former state senator and former mayor of Milledgeville
- Michael Owens, former chair of the Cobb County Democratic Party, U.S. Marine Corps veteran and cybersecurity executive

==== Did not file ====
- Manswell Peterson, former college professor

=== Endorsements ===
Michael Owens

Statewide officials

- Roy Barnes, former governor of Georgia (1999–2003)

State senators

- Michael Rhett, state senator from the 33rd district (2015–present)

Organizations

- The Collective PAC
Bee Nguyen

State senators

- Michelle Au, state senator from the 48th district (2021–present)
- Kim Jackson, state senator from the 41st district (2021–present)
- Nikki Merritt, state senator from the 9th district (2021–present)
- Sheikh Rahman, state senator from the 5th district (2019–present)

State representatives

- Stacey Abrams, former state representative from the 89th district (2007–2017), nominee for Governor in 2018 and 2022 and founder of Fair Fight Action (endorsed in runoff)
- Jasmine Clark, state representative from the 108th district (2019–present)
- Shelly Hutchinson, state representative from the 107th district (2019–present)
- Gregg Kennard, state representative from the 102nd district (2019–present)
- Marvin Lim, state representative from the 99th district (2021–present)
- Pedro Marin, state representative from the 96th district (2003–present)
- Dewey McClain, state representative from the 100th district (2013–present)
- Donna McLeod, state representative from the 105th district (2019–present)
- Rebecca Mitchell, state representative from the 106th district (2021–present)
- Beth Moore, state representative from the 95th district (2019–present)
- Sam Park, state representative from the 101st district (2017–present)

Local officials

- Kirkland Carden, Gwinnett County commissioner (2020–present)
- Ben Ku, Gwinnett County commissioner (2018–present)

Organizations

- EMILY's List
- End Citizens United
- NARAL Pro-Choice America
- People for the American Way

=== First round ===
==== Debates ====
2022 Georgia Secretary of State Democratic primary election debates
No.	Date	Organizer	P Participant A Absent (invited) I Invited N Not invited					Source
No.	Date	Organizer	Dee Dawkins-Haigler	John Eaves	Floyd Griffin	Bee Nguyen	Michael Owens	Source
1	May 2, 2022	Atlanta Press Club, Georgia Public Broadcasting	P	P	P	P	P	

==== Polling ====
Poll source	Date(s) administered	Sample size	Margin of error	Dee Dawkins-Haigler	John Eaves	Floyd Griffin	Bee Nguyen	Michael Owens	Manswell Peterson	Undecided
SurveyUSA	April 22–27, 2022	549 (LV)	± 5.1%	7%	7%	6%	12%	9%	–	60%
Emerson College	April 1–3, 2022	509 (LV)	± 4.3%	13%	14%	4%	7%	5%	0%	57%

==== Results ====
Initial primary results map by county: Nguyen: 20–30%; 30–40%; 40–50%; 50–60%; 60–70%; Dawkins-Haigler: 20–30%; 30–40%; 40–50%; Owens: 20–30%; 30–40%; 40–50%; Griffin: 20–30%; 30–40%; 40–50%; 70–80%; Nguyen/Owens tie: 20–30%

Democratic primary results
Party	Candidate	Votes	%
Democratic	Bee Nguyen	309,437	44.33%
Democratic	Dee Dawkins-Haigler	130,278	18.67%
Democratic	Michael Owens	114,621	16.42%
Democratic	Floyd Griffin	75,423	10.81%
Democratic	John Eaves	68,233	9.78%
Total votes		697,992	100.0%

=== Runoff ===
==== Debate ====
2022 Georgia Secretary of State democratic primary runoff debate
No.	Date	Host	Moderator	Link	Democratic	Democratic
Key: P Participant A Absent N Not invited I Invited W Withdrawn						
Key: P Participant A Absent N Not invited I Invited W Withdrawn					Dee Dawkins-Haigler	Bee Nguyen
1	Jun. 6, 2022	Atlanta Press Club	Lisa Rayam	YouTube	P	P

==== Results ====
Runoff primary results map by county: Nguyen: 50–60%; 60–70%; 70–80%; 80–90%; >90%; Dawkins-Haigler: 50–60%; 60–70%; Nguyen/Dawkins-Haigler tie: 50–60%

Democratic primary runoff results
Party	Candidate	Votes	%
Democratic	Bee Nguyen	198,511	77.00%
Democratic	Dee Dawkins-Haigler	59,310	23.00%
Total votes		257,821	100.0%

== Libertarian primary ==
=== Candidates ===
==== Declared ====
- Ted Metz, former chair of the Libertarian Party of Georgia and nominee for governor in 2018

== General election ==
=== Debate ===
2022 Georgia Secretary of State debate
No.	Date	Host	Moderator	Link	Republican	Democratic	Libertarian
Key: P Participant A Absent N Not invited I Invited W Withdrawn							
Key: P Participant A Absent N Not invited I Invited W Withdrawn					Brad Raffensperger	Bee Nguyen	Ted Metz
1	Oct. 28, 2022	Atlanta Press Club; Georgia Public Broadcasting	Lisa Rayam	YouTube	P	P	P

=== Predictions ===
Source	Ranking	As of
Sabato's Crystal Ball	Lean R	November 3, 2022
Elections Daily	Lean R	November 7, 2022

=== Post-primary endorsements ===
Brad Raffensperger (R)

U.S. representatives

- Adam Kinzinger, U.S. representative for Illinois's 16th congressional district (2011–2023)
Bee Nguyen (D)

U.S. executive branch officials

- Barack Obama, former president of the United States (2009–2017)

Organizations

- Georgia Equality

=== Polling ===
Graphical summary

Poll source	Date(s) administered	Sample size	Margin of error	Brad Raffensperger (R)	Bee Nguyen (D)	Ted Metz (L)	Other	Undecided
Landmark Communications	November 4–7, 2022	1,214 (LV)	± 2.8%	48%	40%	6%	–	6%
SurveyUSA	September 30 – October 4, 2022	1,076 (LV)	± 3.7%	39%	36%	–	7%	18%
University of Georgia	September 5–16, 2022	861 (LV)	± 3.3%	50%	31%	6%	–	13%
Phillips Academy	August 3–7, 2022	971 (RV)	± 3.1%	50%	34%	–	–	16%
SurveyUSA	July 21–24, 2022	604 (LV)	± 5.3%	40%	33%	–	7%	20%
University of Georgia	July 14–22, 2022	902 (LV)	± 3.3%	46%	32%	7%	–	15%

=== Results ===
2022 Georgia Secretary of State election
Party	Candidate	Votes	%	±%
Republican	Brad Raffensperger (incumbent)	2,081,241	53.23%	+4.14%
Democratic	Bee Nguyen	1,719,922	43.99%	−5.32%
Libertarian	Ted Metz	108,884	2.78%	+0.55%
Total votes		3,910,047	100.0%	
Republican hold				

==== By congressional district ====
Raffensperger won nine of 14 congressional districts.

District	Raffensperger	Nguyen	Representative
1st	60%	37%	Buddy Carter
2nd	48%	49%	Sanford Bishop
3rd	67%	30%	Drew Ferguson
4th	24%	74%	Hank Johnson
5th	21%	77%	Nikema Williams
6th	63%	33%	Lucy McBath (117th Congress)
6th	63%	33%	Rich McCormick (118th Congress)
7th	41%	56%	Carolyn Bourdeaux (117th Congress)
7th	41%	56%	Lucy McBath (118th Congress)
8th	67%	30%	Austin Scott
9th	72%	25%	Andrew Clyde
10th	64%	33%	Jody Hice (117th Congress)
10th	64%	33%	Mike Collins (118th Congress)
11th	61%	35%	Barry Loudermilk
12th	59%	38%	Rick Allen
13th	21%	78%	David Scott
14th	70%	27%	Marjorie Taylor Greene
