= Dee Dawkins-Haigler =

American politician from Georgia (born 1970)

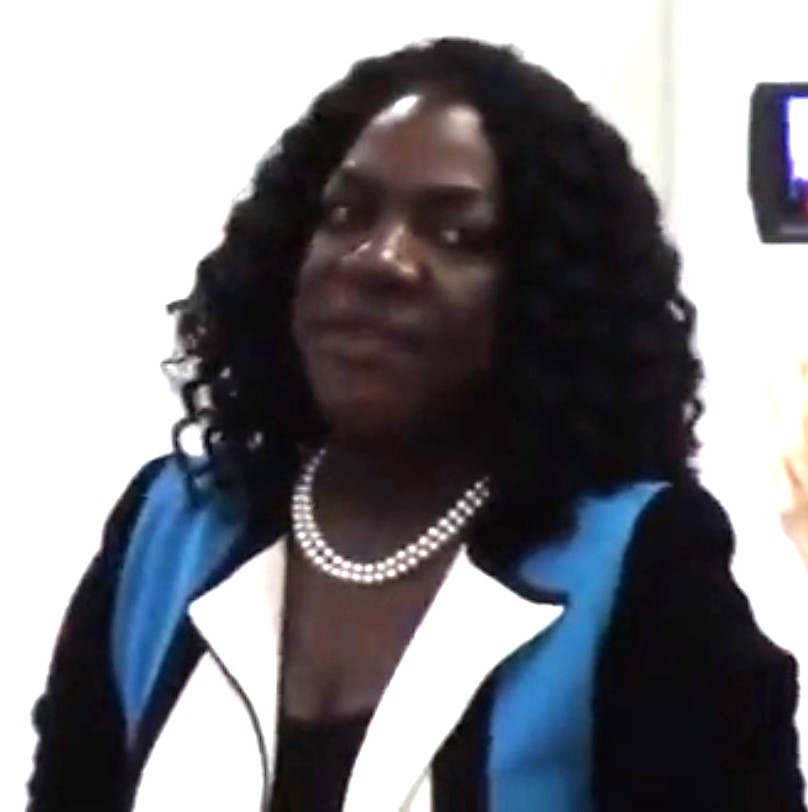
- Dawkins-Hagler in 2018

Member of the Georgia House of Representatives
- In office June 16, 2008 – January 9, 2017
- Preceded by: Walter Ronnie Sailor Jr.
- Succeeded by: Vernon Jones
- Constituency: 93rd district (2008–2013); 91st district (2013–2017)

Personal details
- Born: Dorothea Hawkins; January 31, 1970 (age 56)
- Party: Democratic
- Education: South Carolina State University (BA); Kentucky State University (MPA); Interdenominational Theological Center (MDiv); Clark Atlanta University

Dee Dawkins-Haigler (née Dorothea Dawkins; January 31, 1970) is an American politician from the U.S. state of Georgia. A Democrat, she was a member of the Georgia House of Representatives representing the state's 91st district from 2008 until 2017. She has also run twice as a candidate for secretary of state of Georgia. She is a pastor in the African Methodist Episcopal Church.

== Early life and education ==
Dawkins-Haigler attended South Carolina State University, earning a Bachelor of Arts in political science. She earned a Master of Public Administration from Kentucky State University, a Master of Divinity in theology and ethics from Interdenominational Theological Center's Turner Theological Seminary, and is a doctoral candidate in political science at Clark Atlanta University.

== Career ==
Dawkins-Haigler is a member of the African Methodist Episcopal Church. She is the associate pastor at First St. Paul AME Church in Lithonia, Georgia.

In 2008, Dawkins-Haigler ran in a special election for the 93rd district of the Georgia House of Representatives, to succeed Walter Ronnie Sailor Jr., who resigned the seat. Dawkins-Haigler finished in first place in the primary election on May 13, advancing to a runoff election against Malik Douglas. She won the runoff election on June 10. She faced a primary election for the 2016 general elections on July 15. She entered into a rematch against Douglas, and defeated him in the runoff election on August 5.

Dawkins-Haigler was elected chair of the Georgia Legislative Black Caucus in January 2013. She also served as the chaplain for the National Black Caucus of State Legislators. In the Georgia House, Dawkins-Haigler worked to ensure that sickle-cell anemia was covered under Georgia's medical cannabis program. Dawkins-Haigler ran for reelection in 2010, 2012, and 2014.

Dawkins-Haigler did not seek re-election to the Georgia House of Representatives in 2016. Instead, she was a candidate to represent the 43rd district of the Georgia State Senate, which was represented by Republican JaNice Van Ness. She advanced to a runoff election against Tonya Anderson. In the runoff, Anderson led Dawkins-Haigler in the official vote count by 0.12 percent (4,276 votes to 4,266 votes), leading to Georgia Secretary of State Brian Kemp to order a recount. The recount confirmed Anderson's victory over Dawkins-Haigler by 10 votes.

In the 2018 election, Dawkins-Haigler ran for Georgia Secretary of State; she faced John Barrow and RJ Hadley in the primary election. Barrow received the majority of the vote in the primary election, winning the Democratic nomination without a runoff; Dawkins-Haigler finished second. She was again a candidate for secretary of state in the 2022 election. In the primary election, she received 19 percent of the vote, second to Bee Nguyen, who received 44 percent. Nguyen defeated Dawkins-Haigler in the June 21 runoff election to become the Democratic nominee.

== Personal life ==
Dawkins-Haigler and her husband, David Haigler, met while attending South Carolina State University. They have four children. Her mother, Peggy Butler, involved Dawkins-Haigler in community work, including with the NAACP, from a young age. Butler served as a city councilor and as mayor pro tem for West Columbia, South Carolina. Butler is a candidate for secretary of state of South Carolina in 2022.

Dawkins-Haigler was diagnosed with breast cancer in 2015. She had surgery twice and underwent radiation therapy.

Dawkins-Haigler received the President's Call to Service Award in 2017, in the final days of President Barack Obama's administration. It recognised her work including over 4,000 hours of volunteering.
