= Penny Brown Reynolds =

American judge and politician (born 1961)

- Official portrait, 2022

Secretary of State-elect of Georgia
- Assuming office January 2027
- Governor: Keisha Lance Bottoms (elect)
- Succeeding: Brad Raffensperger

Personal details
- Born: February 23, 1961 (age 65)
- Party: Democratic
- Education: Georgia State University (BS, JD); Interdenominational Theological Center (MDiv); Nova Southeastern University (PhD)

Penny Brown Reynolds (born February 23, 1961), also known as Judge Penny, is an American lawyer, judge, pastor, and civil servant who is the Secretary of State-elect of Georgia. She is most known for her television show Family Court with Judge Penny, which aired for one season and was nominated for an Emmy Award. She spent over a decade as a Fulton County Superior Court judge. During the Biden administration, Reynolds served as deputy assistant secretary of agriculture for civil rights and as acting assistant secretary of agriculture for civil rights from September 2022 to January 2025. She is the first African American elected to the office of Georgia Secretary of State.

== Education ==
Reynolds attended East St. John High School in Reserve, Louisiana. She earned a Bachelor Science degree in criminal justice from Georgia State University, a Juris Doctor from the Georgia State University College of Law, a Master of Divinity from the Interdenominational Theological Center, and a PhD in criminal justice from Nova Southeastern University.

== Career ==
Reynolds worked in the Georgia attorney general's office, as executive counsel and chief of staff to Lieutenant Governor Pierre Howard, and as the first Black woman to serve as executive counsel to the governor of Georgia, at the time Roy Barnes. Barnes later appointed Reynolds to the Fulton County Superior Court. She went on to host the TV show Family Court with Judge Penny, which earned an Emmy nomination but was not renewed for a second season.

After studying at the Interdenominational Theological Center, Reynolds became an associate pastor at the Midway Missionary Baptist Church, where her husband also served as senior pastor. Reynolds has also worked as a mediator and practicing attorney.

In 2022, Reynolds was appointed deputy assistant secretary of agriculture for civil rights, where her portfolio focused on management and operations. She began serving as acting assistant secretary of agriculture for civil rights in November 2023, and remained in that role at least through July 2024.

Reynolds announced her campaign for the Democratic nomination for the 2026 Georgia Secretary of State election in 2025. She defeated Fulton County Commissioner Dana Barrett in the runoff and faced State Representative Tim Fleming in the November general election. Reynolds defeated Fleming.

== Selected works ==
- Brown-Reynolds, Penny (1998). Women and the Law: A Guide to Women's Legal Rights in Georgia: An Update, June 1996 through December 1997 (PDF). Atlanta: Georgia Commission on Women.
- Reynolds, Penny Brown (2010). 7 Steps to Peace of Mind. Brentwood Christian Press. ISBN 978-1-59581-544-6.
- Reynolds, Penny Brown (2015). Real Talk for Real Sisters: Wisdom and Truth for Today's Women and Teens. SparrowHouse Publishing. ISBN 978-1-942545-30-9. OCLC 1285760416.

== See also ==
- List of African American jurists
- List of African-American statewide elected officials
- List of female secretaries of state in the United States
- Timeline of African-American firsts

Political offices
Preceded by Brad Raffensperger	Secretary of State of Georgia; Taking office 2027	Elect
