= Bee Nguyen =

American politician (born 1981)

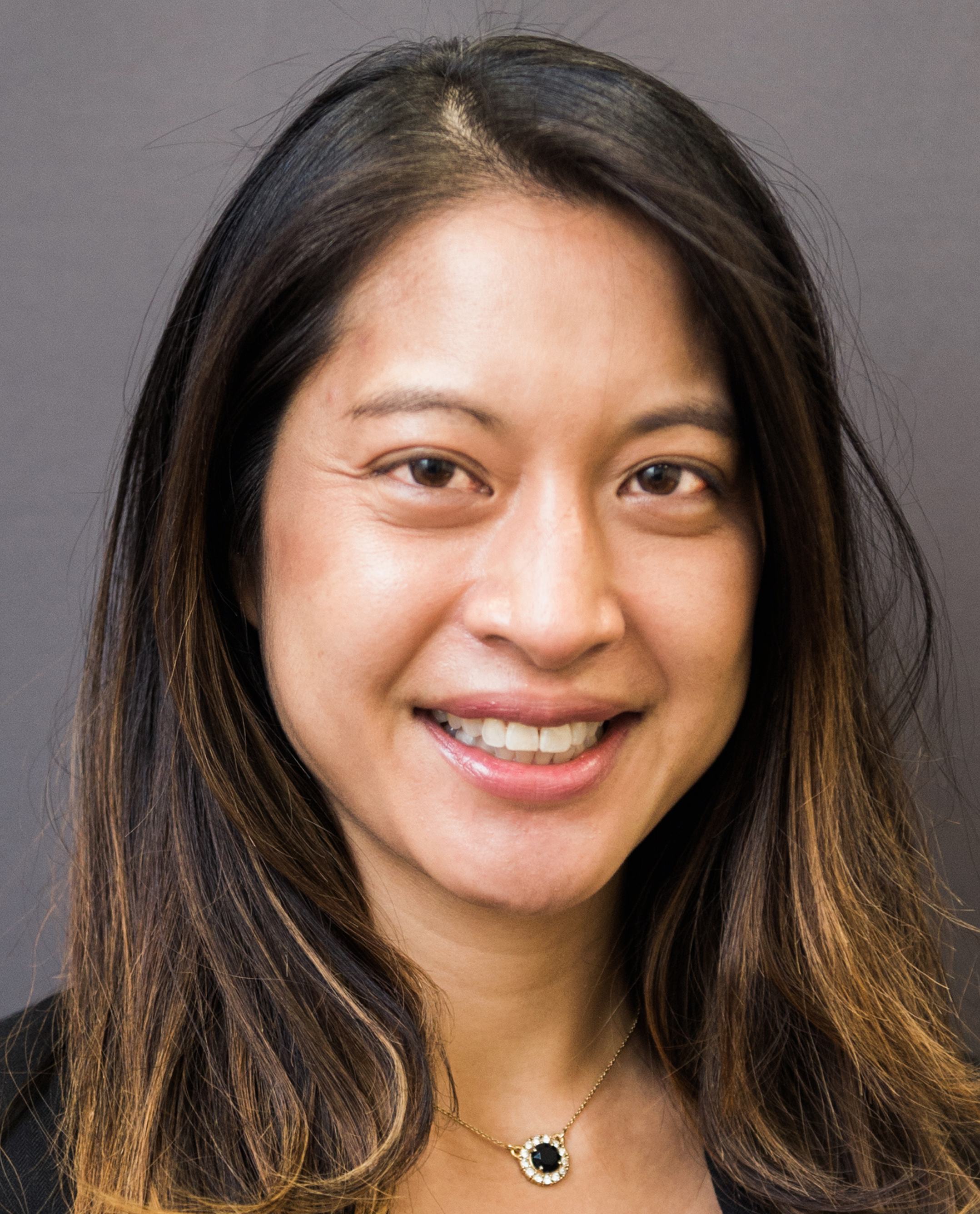
- Official portrait, 2017

Member of the Georgia House of Representatives from the 89th district
- In office December 15, 2017 – January 9, 2023
- Preceded by: Stacey Abrams
- Succeeded by: Saira Draper (redistricted)

Personal details
- Born: July 18, 1981 (age 44) Ames, Iowa, U.S.
- Party: Democratic
- Education: Georgia State University (BA, MA, MPA)

Bee Nguyen (born July 18, 1981) is an American nonprofit executive and politician who served as a member of the Georgia House of Representatives from the 89th District from 2017 to 2023. A member of the Democratic Party, she was elected during a special election in December 2017 to fill the seat vacated following Stacey Abrams's resignation in August 2017 to focus on her run for governor. Nguyen is the first Vietnamese-American elected to the Georgia House of Representatives.

Having left elected office, Nguyen now works on the staff of Senator Raphael Warnock as State Director.

== Early life and education ==
Nguyen's parents fled Vietnam by boat, settling in Iowa in 1979. Born in Ames, Iowa, Nguyen grew up in Augusta, Georgia, and attended Georgia State University for her bachelor's and master's in English literature and an MPA in finance and management. She moved to Atlanta in 1999.

== Career ==
Nguyen was previously the executive director of a nonprofit organization she founded, Athena Warehouse, a program to educate and empower girls in under-resourced communities. She is currently National Policy Advisor for New American Leaders. In November 2018, BizJournals included her on a list of 40 under 40s. Nguyen described her charitable work as helping to "focus her desire to reduce economic disparity".

=== Georgia Legislature ===
==== Elections ====
After Abrams resigned from the state legislature, four candidates announced efforts to succeed her.

In addition to being the first Vietnamese-American to win election to the Georgia House, Nguyen became the first Asian-American Democratic woman to hold a state office in Georgia.

In June 2020, Nguyen won the Democratic nomination for reelection to her seat by a wide margin.

==== Tenure ====
Nguyen opposed the Election Integrity Act of 2021.

=== 2022 Georgia Secretary of State election ===
On May 4, 2021, Nguyen declared her candidacy for Georgia Secretary of State in the 2022 election. In February 2022, she announced that she had raised over $1 million in her campaign. Nguyen received 44% of the vote, and advanced to a runoff election against Dee Dawkins-Haigler, who received 19% of the vote. Nguyen defeated Dawkins-Haigler in the runoff. She lost to the incumbent, Brad Raffensperger, in the November 8 general election.

Party political offices
Preceded by John Barrow	Democratic nominee for Secretary of State of Georgia; 2022	Succeeded by Penny Reynolds
