= Gabriel Sterling =

American politician and elections official

Personal details
- Born: Robert Gabriel Sterling; November 14, 1970 (age 55) Sandy Springs, Georgia, U.S.
- Party: Republican
- Education: University of Georgia (BA)

Robert Gabriel Sterling (born November 14, 1970) is an American politician and elections official from the state of Georgia. He is the chief operating officer (COO) in the office of the Georgia Secretary of State. He previously served on the city council for Sandy Springs, Georgia. Sterling received widespread attention for his speech denouncing false claims of election fraud in the 2020 election.

== Early life and career ==
Sterling graduated from Riverwood International Charter School in Sandy Springs, and the University of Georgia. He began working in Republican Party politics as a volunteer for Mack Mattingly in his unsuccessful 1986 reelection bid to the U.S. Senate. He served as campaign manager for Charlie Norwood in his successful election to the U.S. House of Representatives in 1994. In 1998, Sterling ran for the Georgia House of Representatives in District 43, facing Dorothy Felton in the Republican Party primary election. Sterling lost the election.

Sterling was elected to the Sandy Springs City Council, taking office in 2011. In 2017, he did not run for reelection, and instead ran for the chair's seat on the Fulton County Commission. He finished in third place, behind Robb Pitts and Keisha Waites, both members of the Democratic Party.

== Georgia Secretary of State's office ==
Georgia Secretary of State Brad Raffensperger appointed Sterling the COO of the Secretary of State's office after winning the 2018 election. He became an independent contractor in November 2019, and worked to roll out the use of new voting machines purchased from Dominion Voting Systems for the 2020 Georgia state elections. Sterling held a press conference in which he publicly rejected President Donald Trump's allegations of voter fraud after Joe Biden won Georgia in the 2020 United States presidential election, saying they were "all easily, provably false," and warned that statements by Trump and other leading Republicans would result in innocent people getting killed.

Sterling testified in public hearings before the United States House Select Committee on the January 6 Attack on June 21, 2022. During the hearing, Congressman Adam Schiff (D-CA) played a recording of Sterling's remarks and asked him what had inspired them. Sterling replied that he had "lost it" after seeing a death threat against a Georgia elections worker written on Twitter by QAnon supporters spreading the same conspiracy theories about the 2020 election that Trump was espousing, and decided to speak out against such misinformation.

== 2026 Secretary of State campaign ==
On September 4, 2025, Sterling announced that he would run for Georgia Secretary of State as a Republican in 2026. He did not advance to the runoff election.
