= Jody Hice =

American politician and radio host (born 1960)

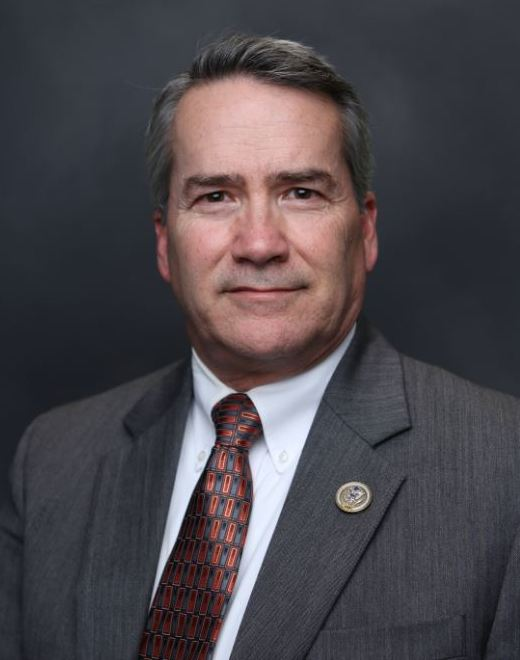
- Official portrait, 2017

Member of the U.S. House of Representatives from Georgia's 10th district
- In office January 3, 2015 – January 3, 2023
- Preceded by: Paul Broun
- Succeeded by: Mike Collins

Personal details
- Born: Jody Brownlow Hice; April 22, 1960 (age 66) Atlanta, Georgia, U.S.
- Party: Republican
- Spouse: Dee Dee Hice (m. 1983)
- Children: 2
- Education: Asbury University (BA); Southwestern Baptist Theological Seminary (MDiv); Luther Rice College and Seminary (DMin)

Jody Brownlow Hice (born April 22, 1960) is an American politician, radio show host, and political activist who served as the U.S. representative for Georgia's 10th congressional district from 2015 to 2023. He is a member of the Republican Party.

Hice was a candidate in the 2022 Georgia Secretary of State election, running against incumbent Brad Raffensperger, a fellow Republican. Raffensperger refused to overturn the results of the 2020 presidential election in Georgia after former president Donald Trump and his Republican allies, including Hice, made baseless claims of fraud. After Hice announced his candidacy, Trump endorsed him. On May 24, 2022, he lost the primary to Raffensperger.

== Early life and education ==
Hice is a native of Atlanta and received his Bachelor of Arts degree from Asbury College in Wilmore, Kentucky, a Master of Divinity degree from Southwestern Baptist Theological Seminary in Fort Worth, Texas, and a Doctor of Ministry degree from Luther Rice Seminary in Atlanta, Georgia.

== Ministry ==
In 1998, he became senior pastor of the Bethlehem First Baptist Church in Bethlehem, Georgia, until April 2010. In addition, he was first vice president of the Georgia Baptist Convention (2004–05) and Professor of Preaching at Luther Rice Seminary. In 2002, he started Let Freedom Ring, a talk radio show originally heard on WIMO 1300 AM, Bethlehem, Georgia. Hice was senior pastor at The Summit Church, a Southern Baptist church, in Loganville, Georgia, from 2011 until December 2013, when he stepped down to run for office.

== U.S. House of Representatives ==
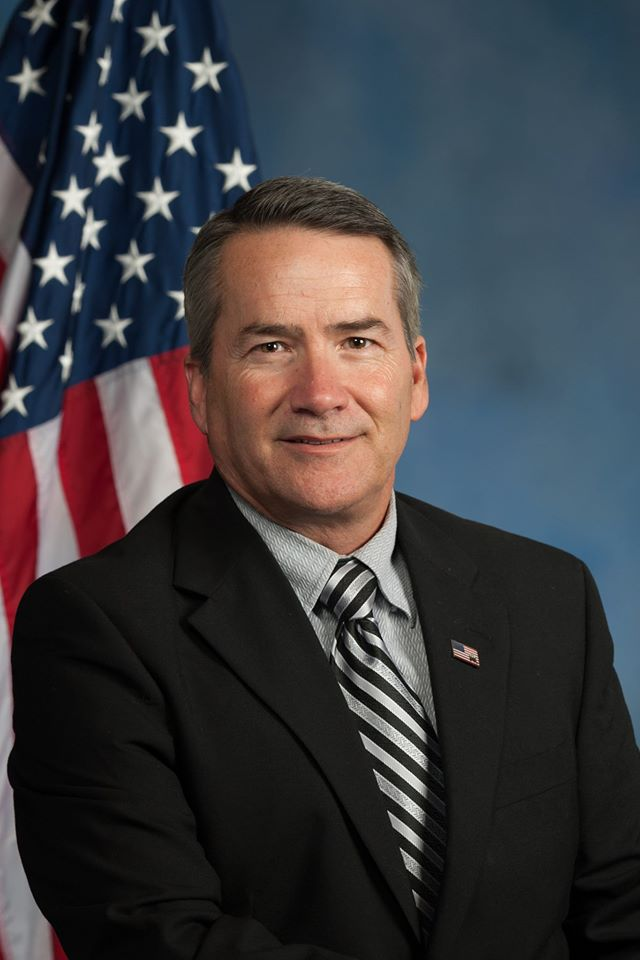
Official freshman portrait (114th Congress)

=== Elections ===
==== 2010 ====
Hice unsuccessfully sought the Republican nomination for the U.S. House of Representatives in Georgia's 7th congressional district in 2010, losing the runoff to former congressional aide Rob Woodall.

==== 2014 ====
Georgia's 10th congressional district became an open seat when the sitting representative, Paul Broun, announced his bid for U.S. Senate in 2014. Hice was the second to formally enter the race on April 15, 2013, citing government spending as his foremost concern. He was soon joined by five other candidates, leading to a seven-way primary campaign. Hice finished first in the May 20 primary with 34% of the vote, followed closely by trucking company owner Mike Collins with 33%.

Since no candidate won 50% of the vote, a primary runoff election between Hice and Collins ensued. The race quickly grew heated amid accusations of campaign sign theft from both sides and reports of supporters being harassed at debates. Hice won the runoff with 54% of the vote.

Hice won the November general election with 66.52% of the vote in a Republican wave year.

==== 2018 ====
After winning the Republican primary with 78% of the vote, Hice faced Democratic nominee Tabitha A. Johnson-Green.

During an October 2018 campaign event in which he appeared with Georgia secretary of state Brian Kemp, Hice decried former president Barack Obama as having "pushed his own socialist agenda" during his two terms in office. Hice urged the small crowd to oppose the resurgence of Democratic candidates in the 2018 midterm elections, saying, "it's time for this so-called blue wave to be body-slammed!" He defeated Johnson-Green in the general election.

==== 2020 ====
After winning the Republican primary, Hice once again faced Democratic nominee Johnson-Green. He won the general election.

In January 2021, Hice made an unsuccessful objection to the counting of Georgia's electoral votes. Georgia senator Kelly Loeffler had planned on objecting to Georgia's electors, but withdrew her objection after the 2021 United States Capitol attack earlier in the day. Hice was one of the 139 Republican representatives who voted to overturn the results of the 2020 presidential election in Congress that day.

=== Committee assignments ===
- Committee on Natural Resources
  - Subcommittee on Energy and Mineral Resources
  - Subcommittee on Water, Power and Oceans
- Committee on Oversight and Government Reform
  - Vice Chairman of the Subcommittee on Government Operations
  - Subcommittee on National Security

=== Caucus memberships ===
- Freedom Caucus
- Congressional Western Caucus
- Veterinary Medicine Caucus
- Republican Study Committee
- Second Amendment Caucus

== 2022 Georgia secretary of state election ==
On March 22, 2021, Hice announced that he would run against incumbent Georgia secretary of state Brad Raffensperger, a fellow Republican, in 2022. Raffensperger refused to overturn the results of the 2020 election in Georgia after Trump and his Republican allies, including Hice, made false claims of fraud. After Hice announced his run, Trump endorsed him. During his campaign, Hice continued to make numerous false claims about the 2020 election. On May 24, 2022, Hice lost the primary to Raffensperger, who garnered enough votes to avoid a runoff.

== Political positions ==
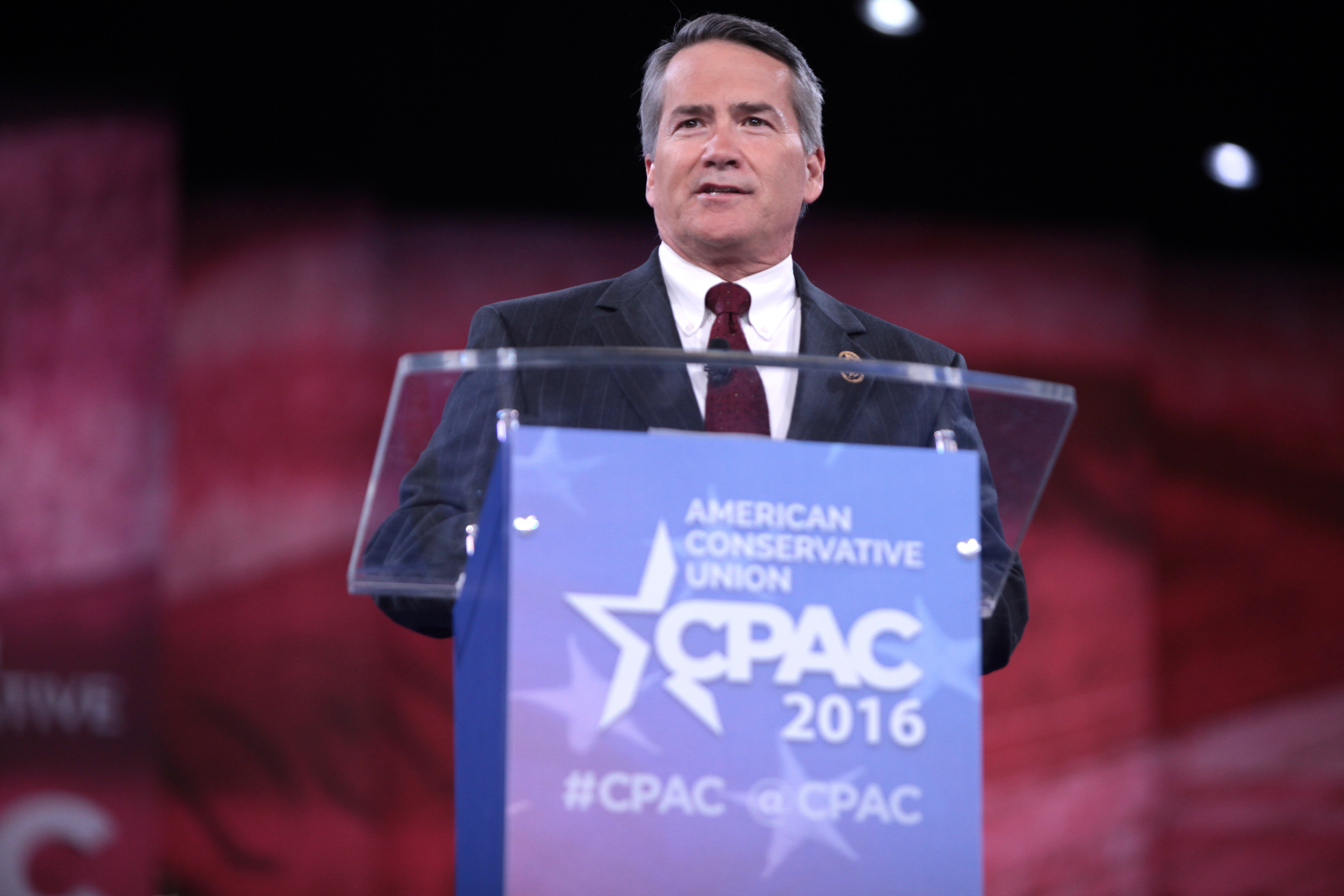
Hice speaking at the 2016 Conservative Political Action Conference

Hice calls himself a "constitutional conservative." He has a history of repeatedly sharing quotes falsely attributed to the Founding Fathers. He has been described as a staunch Trump loyalist and an America First Republican.

=== Economic issues ===
Hice supports a balanced budget amendment.

Hice supports auditing the Federal Reserve and its activities around mortgages. He co-sponsored the Federal Reserve Transparency Act.

Hice voted for the Tax Cuts and Jobs Act of 2017.

Along with all other Senate and House Republicans, Hice voted against the American Rescue Plan Act of 2021.

=== Abortion ===
Hice opposes abortion. He has said that supporters of abortion rights are worse than Adolf Hitler. Hice believes that life begins at fertilization or cloning. He opposes family planning assistance that includes abortion.

=== U.S. Capitol Police ===
In June 2021, Hice was one of 21 House Republicans to vote against a resolution to give the Congressional Gold Medal to police officers who defended the U.S. Capitol on January 6.

=== Foreign policy ===
In 2021, during a House vote on a measure condemning the Myanmar coup d'état that overwhelmingly passed, Hice was one of 14 Republican representatives to vote against it, for reasons reported to be unclear.

In July 2021, Hice voted against the bipartisan ALLIES Act, which would increase by 8,000 the number of special immigrant visas for Afghan allies of the U.S. military during its invasion of Afghanistan, while also reducing some application requirements that caused long application backlogs; the bill passed in the House 407–16.

Hice was one of 19 House Republicans to vote against the final passage of the 2022 National Defense Authorization Act.

In February 2022, Hice co-sponsored the Secure America's Borders First Act, which would prohibit the expenditure or obligation of military and security assistance to Kyiv over the U.S. border with Mexico.

=== Interest group ratings ===
Hice has a "D" rating from pro-marijuana legalization group NORML for his voting history regarding cannabis-related issues.

=== LGBT rights ===
Hice opposes same-sex marriage. According to Right Wing Watch, he compared homosexuality to alcoholism and opposed a ban on conversion therapy. In a 2012 book, Hice wrote that gay people were plotting to recruit and sodomize children, citing as proof an essay by gay writer Michael Swift that he took out of context. In 2015, Hice cosponsored a resolution to amend the Constitution to ban same-sex marriage. Hice condemned the Supreme Court decision in Obergefell v. Hodges, which held that same-sex marriage bans violated the constitution. He has compared gay relationships to incest and bestiality.

=== Religious issues ===
Hice was a leading supporter of the public display of the Ten Commandments in government buildings; he founded Ten Commandments Georgia, Inc., a group advocating for the display of the Ten Commandments in every Georgia county courthouse. Hice began the initiative as a pastor, waging a fight against the American Civil Liberties Union over a display in the Barrow County Courthouse, and later supported similar efforts in the Morgan County Superior Courthouse.

In September 2008, Hice was one of 33 pastors across America to participate in "Pulpit Freedom Sunday" in opposition to the Johnson Amendment, a provision of the tax code that prohibits tax-exempt organizations (such as churches) from endorsing or opposing political candidates. In the sermon, Hice endorsed Senator John McCain for president.

Hice has argued that Christians have been "tricked" into a "false belief" in separation of church and state. He asserted that church-state separation leads to government corruption.

In his 2012 book A Call to Reclaim America, Hice wrote, "Although Islam has a religious component, it is much more than a simple religious ideology. It is a complete geo-political structure and, as such, does not deserve First Amendment protection." In his book It's Now or Never, Hice quoted former U.S. general William G. Boykin as stating that there is a Muslim Brotherhood plot to take over the United States.

=== Texas v. Pennsylvania ===
In December 2020, Hice was one of 126 Republican members of the House of Representatives to sign an amicus brief in support of Texas v. Pennsylvania, a lawsuit filed at the United States Supreme Court contesting the results of the 2020 presidential election, in which Joe Biden defeated Trump. The Supreme Court declined to hear the case on the basis that Texas lacked standing under Article III of the Constitution to challenge the results of an election held by another state.

House speaker Nancy Pelosi issued a statement that called signing the amicus brief an act of "election subversion." She also reprimanded Hice and the other House members who supported the lawsuit: "The 126 Republican Members that signed onto this lawsuit brought dishonor to the House. Instead of upholding their oath to support and defend the Constitution, they chose to subvert the Constitution and undermine public trust in our sacred democratic institutions."

=== Biden administration ===
Hice supported efforts to impeach President Joe Biden. During the 117th United States Congress, Hice co-sponsored two resolutions to impeach President Biden. During the 117th Congress, Hice also co-sponsored a resolution to impeach Secretary of Homeland Security Alejandro Mayorkas and a resolution to impeach Secretary of State Antony Blinken.

=== DC statehood ===
In March 2021, in a statement on the House floor, Hice argued against statehood for the District of Columbia and HR 51 by claiming that D.C. would be the only state "without an airport, without a car dealership." Hice was criticized for his statements because airports and car dealerships are not prerequisites for statehood and because D.C. does have car dealerships. Representative Jamie Raskin called his argument "frivolous" and accused Republicans of attempting to "gin up whatever arguments they can think of" to oppose D.C. statehood.

=== Immigration ===
Hice voted against the Further Consolidated Appropriations Act of 2020, which authorizes DHS to nearly double the available H-2B visas for the remainder of FY 2020.

Hice voted against the Consolidated Appropriations Act (H.R. 1158), which effectively prohibits Immigration and Customs Enforcement from cooperating with the Department of Health and Human Services to detain or remove illegal alien sponsors of Unaccompanied Alien Children.

== Personal life ==
He is married to Dee Dee Hice.

U.S. House of Representatives
Preceded by Paul Broun	Member of the U.S. House of Representatives from Georgia's 10th congressional district 2015–2023	Succeeded by Mike Collins
U.S. order of precedence (ceremonial)
Preceded by Paul Broun as Former U.S. Representative	Order of precedence of the United States as Former U.S. Representative	Succeeded by Drew Ferguson as Former U.S. Representative
