= 2018 Georgia Secretary of State election =

- November 6, 2018 (general); December 4, 2018 (runoff)
- Turnout: 61.44% ▲ (first round); 22.98% ▼ (runoff)
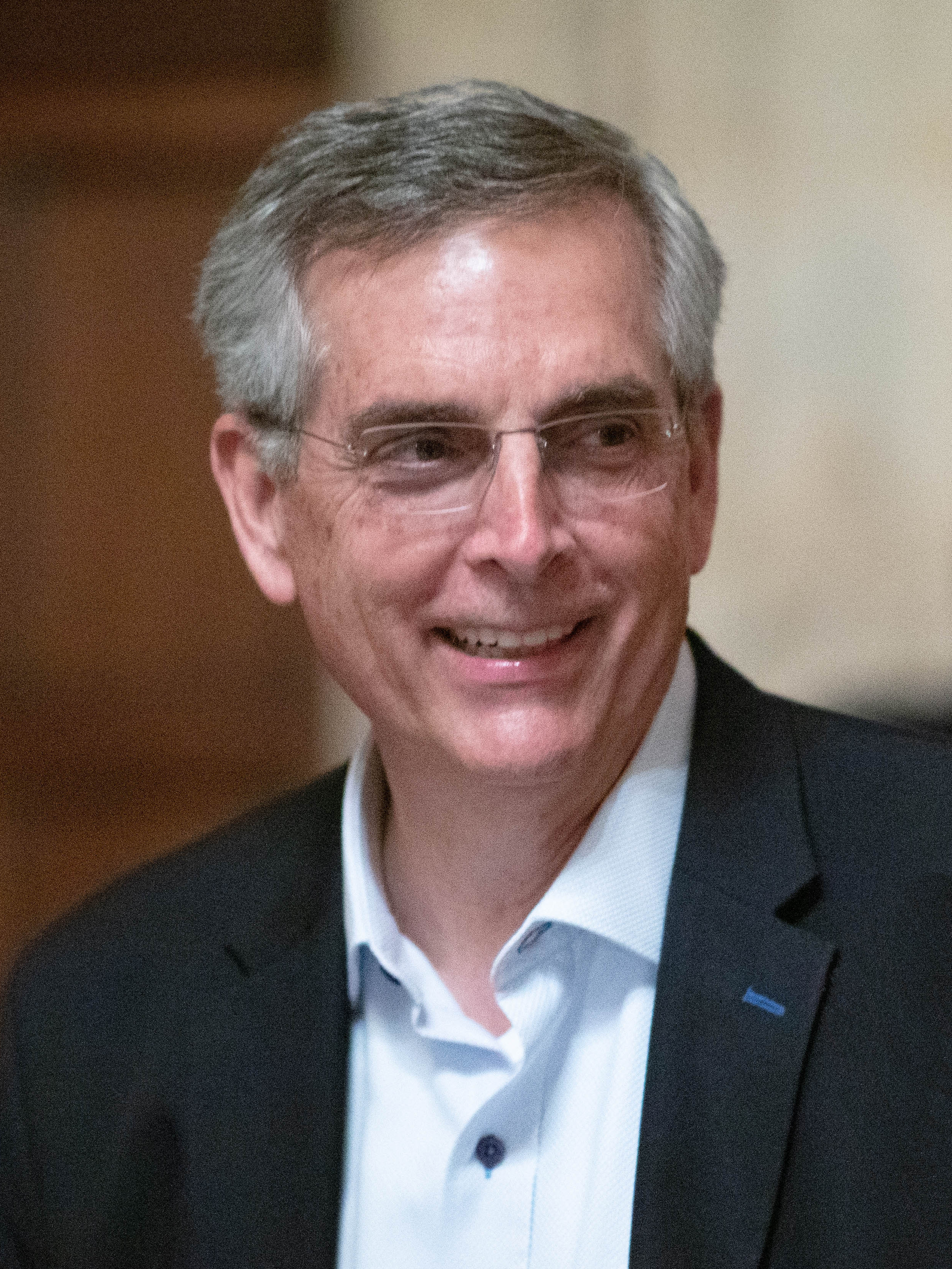

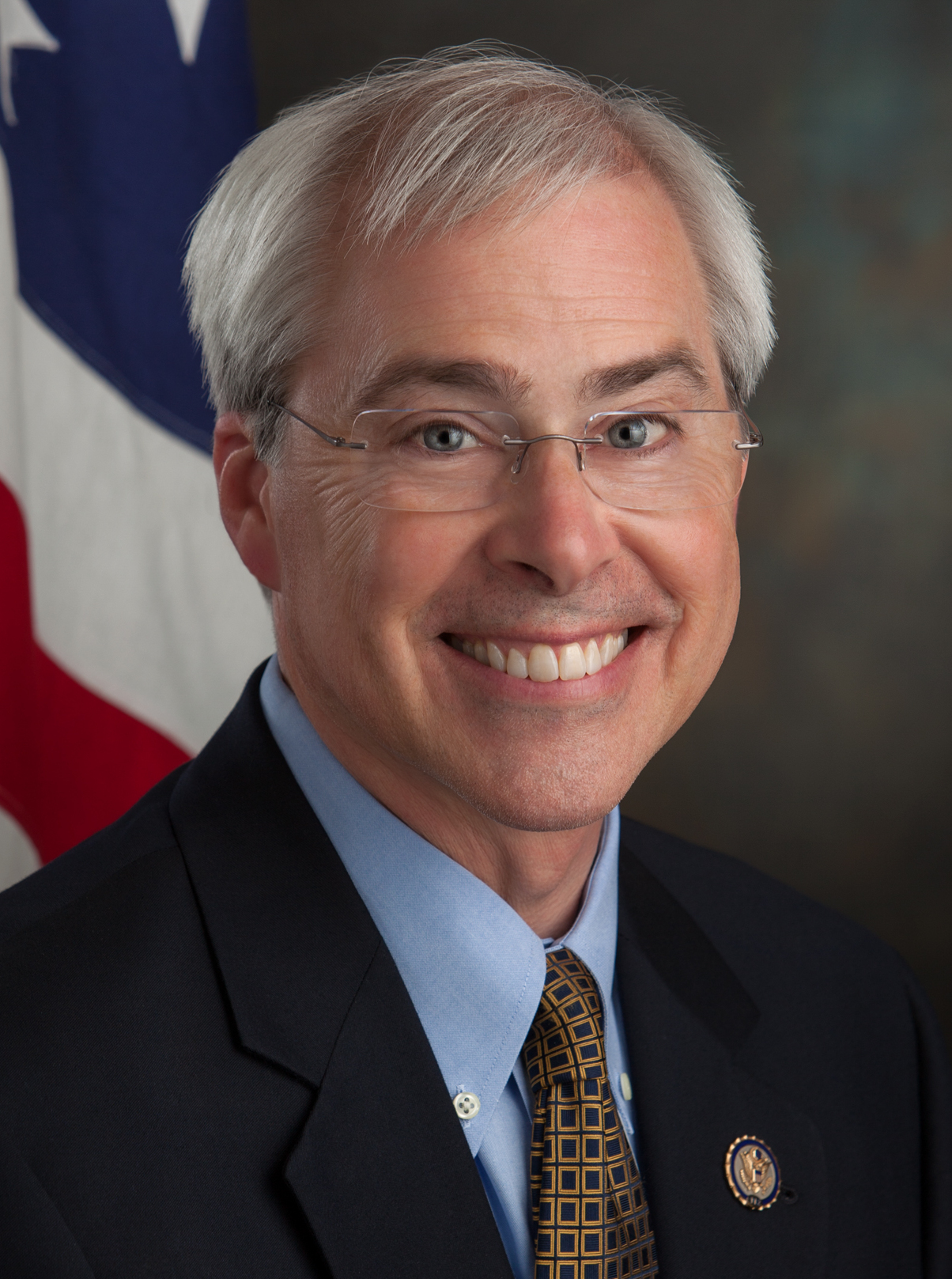
Nominee	Brad Raffensperger	John Barrow
Party	Republican	Democratic
First round	1,906,588; 49.09%	1,890,310; 48.67%
Runoff	764,855; 51.89%	709,049; 48.11%
- Raffensperger: 40–50% 50–60% 60–70% 70–80% 80–90% >90% Barrow: 50–60% 60–70% 70–80% 80–90% >90% Tie: 50% No data
Secretary of State before election
Brian Kemp
Republican
Elected Secretary of State
Brad Raffensperger
Republican

The 2018 Georgia Secretary of State election was held on November 6, 2018, to elect the secretary of state of Georgia. It was held concurrently with the 2018 gubernatorial election, as well as elections for the United States Senate and elections for the United States House of Representatives, and various state and local elections. Republican Incumbent Secretary of State Brian Kemp chose not to run for re-election, and instead ran successfully for governor. Since no candidate received the requisite 50 percent of the vote, the top two candidates, Democrat John Barrow and Republican Brad Raffensperger, proceeded to a runoff on December 4, 2018.

At 22.98%, the runoff saw the lowest voter turnout out of any Georgia statewide election since the senate runoff of 1992.

In the runoff election, Raffensperger unexpectedly flipped rural counties Sumter and Warren, which were reliably Democratic counties that have not voted Republican on the presidential levels since 1972 for Warren, and 2004 for Sumter. However, both counties had been trending Republican in recent elections. Raffensperger also flipped Atlanta suburban counties Cobb and Newton, which had been trending away from Republicans in recent elections. As of 2022, this was the last time Cobb and Newton went Republican in a statewide race in Georgia.

Georgia has been a Republican triplex since 2011, meaning that its governor, attorney general, and secretary of state have all been members of the same party. The state maintained that status following this election, as Republicans won every statewide office. This was the first time in Georgia state history that any statewide executive election went to a second round.

== Republican primary ==
=== Candidates ===
==== Nominee ====
- Brad Raffensperger, state representative

==== Eliminated in runoff ====
- David Belle Isle, mayor of Alpharetta

==== Eliminated in primary ====
- Buzz Brockway, state representative
- Joshua McKoon, state senator

==== Declined ====
- John Albers, state senator
- Steve Gooch, state senator
- Liz Hausmann, Fulton County commissioner
- Brian Kemp, incumbent secretary of state of Georgia (running for governor)
- Michael Williams, State Senator (running for governor)

=== Endorsements ===
David Belle Isle

Mayors

- Tommy Allegood, Acworth mayor
- Boyd Austin, Dallas mayor
- Peter Banks, Barnesville mayor
- Billy Copeland, McDonough mayor
- Jamie Doss, Rome mayor
- Danny Dunagan Gainesville mayor
- Ken Gowen, Tunnel Hill mayor
- Alan Hallman, Hapeville mayor
- John Harley, Centerville mayor
- Donnie Henriques, Woodstock mayor
- Gene Hobgood, Canton mayor
- Bucky Johnson, Norcross mayor
- Joe Lockwood, Milton mayor
- Jack Longino, College Park mayor
- Steve Miller, Holly Springs mayor
- Dennis Mock, Dalton mayor
- Robert Price, Locust Grove mayor
- Tom Reed, Chattahoochee Hills mayor
- Rick Roberts, Ball Ground mayor
- Jim Sill, Mountain Park mayor
- Julie Smith, Tifton mayor
- Gary Thrower, Milledgeville mayor
- Vince Williams, Union City mayor
Buzz Brockway

State representatives

- Michael Caldwell, state representative

=== First round ===
==== Results ====
Initial primary results map by county: Raffensperger: 30–40% 40–50% 50–60%; Isle: 30–40% 40–50%; McKoon: 30–40% 40–50% 50–60% 60–70%; Isle/Brockway tie: 30–40%

Republican primary results
Party	Candidate	Votes	%
Republican	Brad Raffensperger	185,386	34.96%
Republican	David Belle Isle	151,328	28.54%
Republican	Joshua McKoon	112,113	21.14%
Republican	Buzz Brockway	81,492	15.37%
Total votes		530,319	100.00%

=== Runoff ===
==== Polling ====
Poll source	Date(s) administered	Sample size	Margin of error	David Belle Isle	Brad Raffensperger	Undecided
Rosetta Stone	June 7, 2018	400	± 4.9%	24%	42%	34%

==== Results ====
Runoff primary results map by county: Raffensperger: 50–60% 60–70% 70–80%; Isle: 50–60% 60–70% 70–80%

Republican primary runoff results
Party	Candidate	Votes	%
Republican	Brad Raffensperger	331,127	61.74%
Republican	David Belle Isle	205,223	38.26%
Total votes		536,350	100.00%

== Democratic primary ==
=== Candidates ===
==== Nominee ====
- John Barrow, former U.S. representative

==== Eliminated in primary ====
- Dee Dawkins-Haigler, former state representative and candidate for state senate in 2016
- RJ Hadley, former Rockdale County tax commissioner and candidate for U.S. Senate in 2010

==== Declined ====
- Teresa Tomlinson, mayor of Columbus
- David Worley, Georgia State Elections Board member, former chair of the Democratic Party of Georgia and nominee for GA-06 in 1990

=== Results ===
Primary results map by county: Barrow: 30–40% 40–50% 50–60% 60–70% 70–80% 80–90%; Dawkins-Haigler: 40–50%

Democratic primary results
Party	Candidate	Votes	%
Democratic	John Barrow	264,864	51.48%
Democratic	Dee Dawkins-Haigler	151,963	29.54%
Democratic	RJ Hadley	97,682	18.99%
Total votes		514,509	100.00%

== Libertarian convention ==
=== Candidates ===
==== Nominee ====
- J. Smythe DuVal, registered nurse and medical I.T. entrepreneur

== General election ==
=== Predictions ===
Source	Ranking	As of
Governing	Lean R	October 11, 2018

=== Polling ===
Poll source	Date(s) administered	Sample size	Margin of error	Brad Raffensperger (R)	John Barrow (D)	Smythe DuVal (L)	Undecided
20/20 Insights (D-Southern Majority)	October 31 – November 2, 2018	614	± 4.0%	42%	48%	3%	7%
Cygnal (R)	October 27–30, 2018	467	± 4.4%	47%	45%	6%	2%
University of Georgia	September 30 – October 9, 2018	1,232	± 2.8%	41%	37%	6%	15%
Public Policy Polling	October 5–6, 2018	729	± 3.0%	43%	41%	–	16%
Gravis Marketing	July 27–29, 2018	650	± 3.8%	41%	45%	–	15%

=== Results ===
2018 Georgia secretary of state election
Party	Candidate	Votes	%	±%
Republican	Brad Raffensperger	1,906,588	49.09%	−8.38
Democratic	John Barrow	1,890,310	48.67%	+6.14
Libertarian	Smythe DuVal	86,696	2.23%	N/A
Total votes		3,883,594	100.0%	

=== Runoff ===
2018 Georgia secretary of state runoff election
Party	Candidate	Votes	%	±%
Republican	Brad Raffensperger	764,855	51.89%	−5.58
Democratic	John Barrow	709,049	48.11%	+5.58
Total votes		1,473,904	100.0%	
Republican hold				
