= Joshua McKoon =

American politician

Josh McKoon
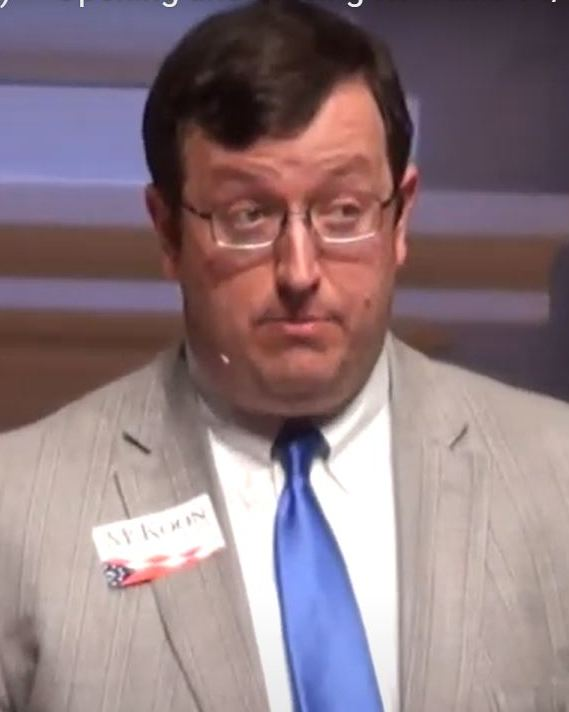

Chair of the Georgia Republican Party
- Incumbent
- Assumed office June 10, 2023
- Preceded by: David Shafer

Member of the Georgia Senate from the 29th district
- In office January 2011 – January 14, 2019
- Preceded by: Seth Harp
- Succeeded by: Randy Robertson

Personal details
- Born: February 25, 1979 (age 47) Columbus, Georgia, U.S.
- Party: Republican
- Education: Furman University (BA); University of Alabama (JD)
- Website: Official website

Joshua McKoon (born February 25, 1979) is an American politician who is Chairman of the Georgia Republican Party. A member of the Republican Party, he formerly represented the 29th district in the Georgia State Senate.

In 2017, McKoon announced that he would not be seeking re-election for State Senate. During his time in the State Senate, McKoon championed "religious liberty" legislation and stricter ethics legislation.

He ran for Georgia Secretary of State, but came in third in the primary receiving nearly 112,000 votes.

As chairman of the Georgia Republican Party, McKoon has pushed for changes to voting laws in Georgia and advocated for 2020 election deniers to serve on the Georgia State Election Board to "stop [Democrats] from cheating in 2024." McKoon is a close ally of his predecessor David Shafer who was indicted in 2023 for his role in the Trump fake electors plot.

Party political offices
Preceded by David Shafer	Chair of the Georgia Republican Party; 2023–present	Incumbent
