= Family Court with Judge Penny =

American reality court show (2008–2009)

- Genre: Arbitration-based reality court show
- Starring: Penny Brown Reynolds (judge); Damon Ormsby (bailiff)
- Narrated by: Bill Fike
- Country of origin: United States
- Original language: English
- No. of seasons: 1
- No. of episodes: 130

Production
- Executive producers: Rasha Drachkovitch; Stephanie Drachkovitch; Judge Penny Brown Reynolds
- Running time: 30 minutes
- Production companies: Walnut Hill Media; 44 Blue Productions; Program Partners

Original release
- Network: Syndication
- Release: September 8, 2008 – May 14, 2009

Family Court with Judge Penny is an American arbitration-based reality court show, presided over by former judge and lawyer Penny Brown Reynolds. The half-hour program, which aired in Syndication, premiered on September 8, 2008. It was produced by 44 Blue Productions and distributed by Program Partners in the United States and Canada. Sony handled barter advertising. The show was nominated for a Daytime Emmy in 2009, but was never renewed and ended production that same year with the final episode airing on May 14, 2009 and reruns continuing until early September.

As of 2024, the show is available for viewing on free streaming services Tubi, Amazon's Prime Video and its sister AVOD service Freevee and The Roku Channel, under license from FilmRise.

In November 2026, Penny Brown Reynolds won the election for Georgia Secretary of State, where she was elected as a Democrat.
