= Robyn Crittenden =

American politician

Commissioner of the Georgia Department of Revenue
- In office July 1, 2021 – November 25, 2022
- Governor: Brian Kemp
- Preceded by: David Curry
- Succeeded by: Frank O’Connell

28th Secretary of State of Georgia
- In office November 8, 2018 – January 14, 2019
- Governor: Nathan Deal
- Preceded by: Brian Kemp
- Succeeded by: Brad Raffensperger

Commissioner of the Georgia Department of Human Services
- In office January 14, 2019 – July 1, 2021
- Governor: Brian Kemp
- Preceded by: Gerlda B. Hines
- Succeeded by: Gerlda B. Hines
- In office July 1, 2015 – November 8, 2018
- Governor: Nathan Deal
- Preceded by: Keith Horton
- Succeeded by: Gerlda B. Hines

Personal details
- Party: Republican
- Education: Yale University (BA); University of Michigan (JD)

Robyn A. Crittenden is an American attorney from the state of Georgia. She was the 28th Georgia Secretary of State. She is the first African-American woman to serve as a statewide constitutional officer in Georgia.

== Biography ==
Crittenden earned her Bachelor of Arts from Yale University and her Juris Doctor from the University of Michigan Law School. Crittenden is a former general counsel for Morehouse College, assistant vice chancellor for legal affairs for the Georgia Board of Regents, and an assistant county attorney for DeKalb County, Georgia.

In 2015, Governor Nathan Deal appointed Crittenden as the commissioner of the Department of Human Services. Following the resignation of Brian Kemp as Secretary of State on November 8, 2018, Deal appointed Crittenden as the 28th Secretary of State to serve the remainder of his term. Following the completion of the term, she was re-appointed commissioner of the Georgia Department of Human Services. In June 2021, Governor Kemp appointed Crittenden to lead the Georgia Department of Revenue, succeeding David Curry, who stepped down to run for U.S. Congress.

Crittenden and her daughter live in Tucker, Georgia.

Political offices
| Preceded by Brian Kemp | Secretary of State of Georgia; 2018–2019 | Succeeded by Brad Raffensperger |
