= Brad Raffensperger =

American politician (born 1955)

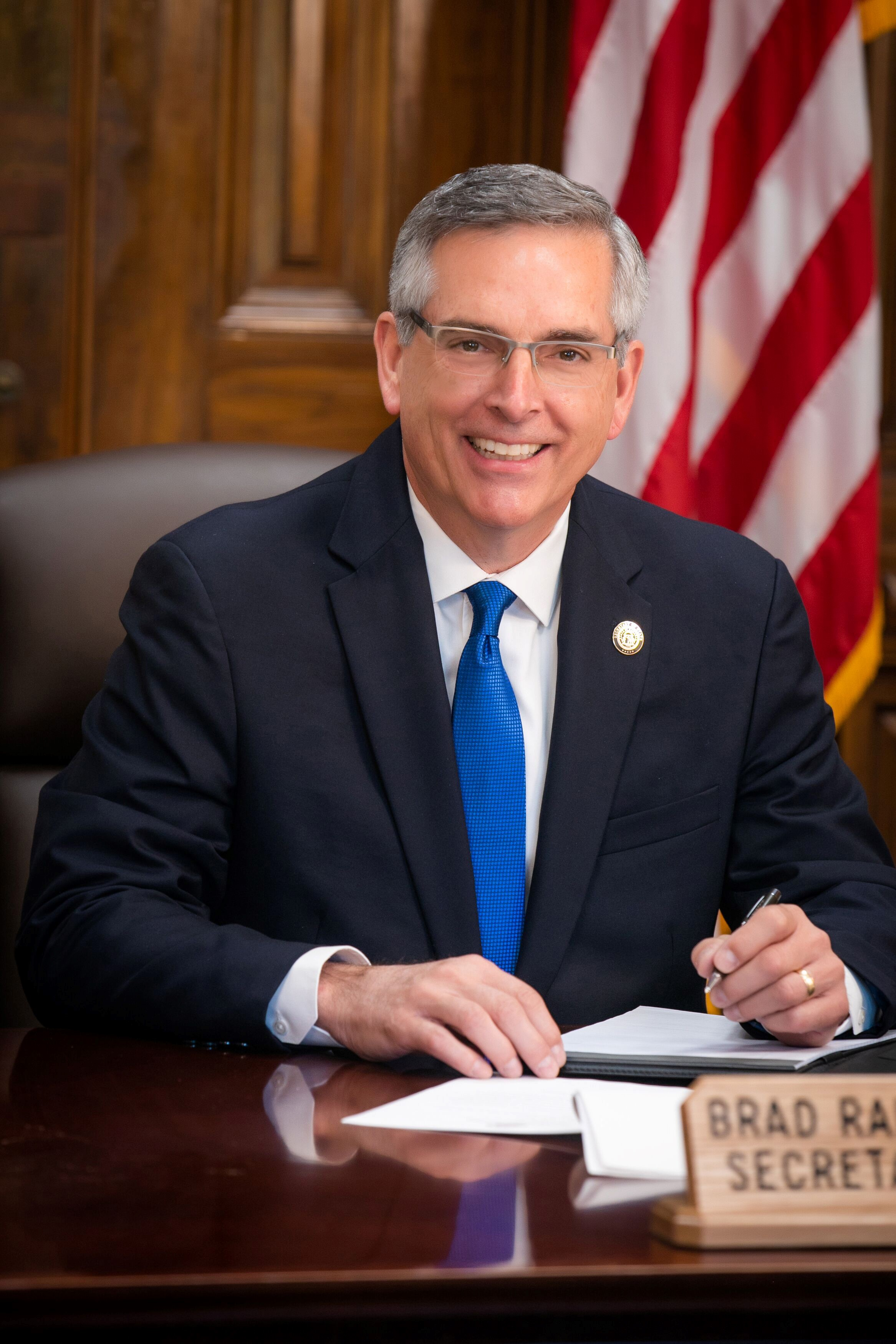
- Raffensperger in 2024

29th Secretary of State of Georgia
- Incumbent
- Assumed office January 14, 2019
- Governor: Brian Kemp
- Preceded by: Robyn Crittenden

Member of the Georgia House of Representatives from the 50th district
- In office February 10, 2015 – January 14, 2019
- Preceded by: Lynne Riley
- Succeeded by: Angelika Kausche

Personal details
- Born: Bradford Jay Raffensperger; May 18, 1955 (age 71)
- Party: Republican
- Spouse: Tricia
- Children: 3
- Education: University of Western Ontario (BS); Georgia State University (MBA)

Bradford Jay Raffensperger (born May 18, 1955) is an American politician serving as the secretary of state of Georgia since 2019. A member of the Republican Party, he previously served in the Georgia House of Representatives, representing District 50.

Raffensperger rose to national prominence in the aftermath of the 2020 U.S. presidential election, in which incumbent president Donald Trump lost. Trump refused to accept defeat, made claims of fraud, and launched an unsuccessful protracted campaign to overturn the election results. As part of this campaign, Trump made a recorded phone call on January 2, 2021, in which he attempted to persuade Raffensperger to change the election results in Georgia in Trump's favor. Raffensperger refused to do so, and said the outgoing president's claims were based on falsehoods.

Raffensperger was reelected in the 2022 Georgia Secretary of State election, after defeating Trump-endorsed challenger Jody Hice in the Republican primary and Democratic challenger Bee Nguyen in the general election.

In September 2025, Raffensperger announced his candidacy for Governor of Georgia in the 2026 Georgia gubernatorial election. He did not advance to the Republican primary runoff.

== Early life and career ==
Raffensperger earned a bachelor's degree in civil engineering from the University of Western Ontario and a Master of Business Administration from Georgia State University.

Raffensperger is the chief executive officer of Tendon Systems, LLC, a contracting and engineering firm that operates in Columbus, Georgia, and Forsyth County, Georgia. He amassed a net worth of $26.5 million from his work in the private sector.

== Political career ==
=== Johns Creek City Council ===
Raffensperger is a lifelong Republican. He served on the Post 2 seat of the Johns Creek City Council from January 1, 2012 to November 19, 2014. He replaced Dan McCabe on the City Council. He resigned in November 2014 to run for the special election to represent the 50th district in the Georgia House, and was succeeded by Chris Coughlin.

=== Georgia House of Representatives ===
Raffensperger subsequently won his bid to the Georgia House in 2015, succeeding Lynne Riley in District 50. In the state House, Raffensperger sponsored legislation to bar county officials from personally profiting from tax liens. Previously, the Fulton County tax commissioner personally collected fees from tax liens and sales of tax liens to private collection companies, allowing him to amass $200,000 over a four-year period. The legislation ended this self-enrichment practice. Raffensperger also sponsored a measure to amend the Georgia state constitution to allow the re-creation of a county that previously existed but had later merged with another county; the measure would allow northern Fulton County to split off to form Milton County.

=== Georgia Secretary of State ===
==== 2018 election ====
Raffensperger ran for the Secretary of State of Georgia in the 2018 election. The Secretary of State in Georgia oversees elections and is chairman of the state election board. The Secretary of State also oversees business registration and occupational licensing.

In the Republican Party primary, Raffensperger faced former Alpharetta mayor David Belle Isle, state representative Buzz Brockway, and state representative Josh McKoon. In the primary, Raffensperger came in first place and Belle Isle came in second place; because no candidate obtained a majority, the race for the Republican nomination went to a primary runoff, which Raffensperger won. During his campaign, Raffensperger "said he would reduce government bureaucracy, support voter ID laws and push for verifiable paper ballots when Georgia replaces its electronic voting machines."

In the November 6, 2018, general election, Raffensperger finished with the most votes, leading Democrat John Barrow by less than one percent. He defeated Barrow in a runoff election on December 4, 2018.

==== Disputes regarding purging of voter rolls and Latino voter access ====
In 2019, Raffensperger fought 2018 Democratic gubernatorial candidate Stacey Abrams, the former minority leader of the Georgia House of Representatives, as she contested his action to remove 300,000 names from the voter registration rolls, and he won the case. In 2021, he removed over 100,000 additional names from the Georgia rolls, depending in part on data received from ERIC, the national Electronic Registration Information Center; nearly all were voters who had filed paperwork to move, as well as those who had passed away.

The Georgia Association of Latino Elected Officials (GALEO) and other civil rights groups sued Raffensperger's Office and the Gwinnett County elections board in federal court, arguing that the county's mailing of mail-in ballot applications printed only in English should also have been sent in the Spanish language to registered voters in Gwinnett County because of its large Spanish-speaking population. The suit was dismissed in October 2020 by U.S. District Judge William M. Ray II, who ruled that the plaintiffs lacked standing and the English-only mailings did not violate the Voting Rights Act. The number of Latinos eligible to vote in Georgia has expanded and turnout percentage has increased since 2016, exceeding countrywide participation rates of that ethnicity said Jerry Gonzalez, GALEO's executive director. Latinos are 5 percent of Georgia's electorate, with about 377,000 Latinos eligible to vote, and about 250,000 registered.

==== 2020 elections ====
===== May and June primary elections =====
In 2020, the Georgia presidential primaries, originally set for March 24, were moved to May 19 (the date for non-presidential primaries in Georgia), due to the COVID-19 pandemic. Later, Raffensperger further postponed the Georgia primaries to June 9 due to the coronavirus crisis. During the 2020 Georgia elections, Raffensperger sought to prevent Georgia polling places from printing paper backups of voter registration and absentee voting information in case polling places would struggle to use voter check-in tablets, called Poll Pads, which had been problematic in Georgia's primary elections in June 2020. The tablets had caused long lines at polling places. Voting rights groups had requested paper backups to prevent a risk of chaos on election day in case the tablets failed. The voting rights groups sued Raffensperger in federal court; they obtained an order from a district judge ordering Georgia election officials to prepare such paper backups, but this order was blocked by the U.S. Court of Appeals for the Eleventh Circuit.

To protect voting rights during the pandemic, Raffensperger directed the mailing of absentee (mail-in) ballot applications to all of Georgia's 6.9 million active registered voters for the state's June 2020 primary. After David Ralston, the Republican speaker of the state House, said that expanded use of mail-in voting would "be extremely devastating to Republicans and conservatives in Georgia," Republicans on a Georgia state House committee advanced legislation to block election officials from sending mail-in ballot request forms to voters ahead of elections. Raffensperger pushed back on the proposal, saying: "By a wide margin, voters on both sides of the political spectrum agree that sending absentee applications to all active voters was the safest and best thing our office could do to protect our voters at the peak of COVID-19. Some seem to be saying that our office should have ignored the wave of absentee voting that was clearly coming." After encountering opposition, the proposed ban died in the Georgia General Assembly.

===== November general elections =====
Raffensperger did not send out mail-in ballot applications to every active registered voter in Georgia for the November 2020 general election, citing the cost of a mass mailing. Rather, Raffensperger created an online portal for Georgia voters to request absentee ballots. He encouraged voters to take advantage of in-person early voting and mail-in voting.

The November 2020 general election in Georgia went smoothly, avoiding the problems that had plagued the primary election in June; Raffensperger credited the successful process to the record numbers of voters who cast ballots before Election Day, either by mail or during Georgia's three-week period of in-person early voting. Democratic presidential candidate Joe Biden became president-elect, defeating incumbent Donald Trump, and Democrats made gains in Georgia, with Biden winning the state, the first time since 1992 that a Democratic presidential nominee had won Georgia.

===== Trump's efforts to change the election results =====
After the election, Raffensperger's fellow Republicans, Georgia's U.S. senators, David Perdue and Kelly Loeffler, issued a joint statement accusing Raffensperger of unspecified "failures" and calling for him to resign. Perdue and Loeffler offered no evidence in support of their claims, which they made after pressure from Trump, who had promoted conspiracy theories about the election and falsely claimed it was rigged. State elections officials and other Republican leaders noted that there was no evidence of wrongdoing in connection with the election. Both Perdue and Loeffler were up for re-election but failed to achieve a majority of the vote, triggering a runoff election in Georgia against their Democratic opponents, which took place on January 5, 2021, and determined party control of the Senate. Raffensperger rejected the calls for his resignation, saying, "As a Republican, I am concerned about Republicans keeping the U.S. Senate. I recommend that Senators Loeffler and Perdue start focusing on that." Raffensperger added, "If I was Senator Perdue, I'd be irritated I was in a runoff. And both Senators and I are all unhappy with the potential outcome for our President."

Under pressure from fellow Republicans, Raffensperger ordered a statewide hand recount/audit of all five million votes in the Georgia presidential race, in which Biden led Trump by approximately 14,000 votes. Critics, including the voting rights group Coalition for Good Governance, described Raffensperger's decision to go forward with the hand recount being motivated by the political pressure he had received from Trump, and said it was not contemplated by Georgia law. Raffensperger denied this, although he did say that fellow Republicans were pressuring him to find ways to exclude legal ballots. Raffensperger said that South Carolina senator Lindsey Graham pressured him in a call to throw out postal ballots favoring Biden. Though Graham denied the allegations, a separate Republican election official who was also present in the call, Gabriel Sterling, confirmed Raffensperger's statement. Doug Collins, a Republican congressman from Georgia who lost his race and oversaw Trump's efforts in Georgia, falsely claimed fraud in the Georgia election, prompting Raffensperger, typically known for his mild manner, to call Collins a "liar" and "charlatan" for his rhetoric. The hand recount reaffirmed Biden's victory, with Biden receiving 2.47 million votes and Trump receiving 2.46 million votes, a margin of 12,670 votes (0.25%). On November 20, Raffensperger certified the final vote totals, and Georgia Governor Brian Kemp issued the formal certification of the state's slate of electors. Trump continued to promote false claims about the electoral process after certification; some Trump supporters harassed or threatened Raffensperger, his wife, and Raffensperger aide Sterling, the state voting system implementation manager, including death threats. Sterling publicly called on Trump to condemn the acts and "Stop inspiring people to commit potential acts of violence."

In March 2021, the Republican-controlled state legislature passed a bill, which was signed into law by Kemp, that removed the position of state election board chair from the Georgia Secretary of State's duties. The law handed control of the state election board chair to the state legislature.

====== Trump–Raffensperger phone call ======
A recording of an hour-long phone call between President Donald Trump, Raffensperger, and several other state and federal officials on January 2, 2021, was obtained by The Washington Post and released the following day. On the call, Trump pressured Raffensperger to change the election results for the state of Georgia to make him the winner; Trump told Raffensperger, "I just want to find 11,780 votes." Raffensperger repeatedly rebuffed Trump's attempts to pressure him.

After the taped call was published, Democratic congressional leaders asked the FBI to investigate the call and probe whether Trump had "engaged in solicitation of, or conspiracy to commit, a number of election crimes." Journalist Carl Bernstein, who in 1972 broke the Watergate scandal with Bob Woodward leading to the resignation of President Richard Nixon, called the Trump–Raffensperger scandal "far worse than Watergate" and said that in any other presidency it would result in impeachment, conviction, and bipartisan demands for the president's resignation. In an interview, Raffensperger said that Trump "did most of the talking" on the call and noted that Trump's voter fraud allegations were "just plain wrong". In a letter to Congress on January 6, 2021, Raffensperger gave a point-by-point refutation of Trump's false election claims. While some House Republicans tried to defend Trump's Georgia call, Democrats began drafting a censure resolution. On January 6, 2021, days after the call, a pro-Trump mob attacked the Capitol while the Congress was counting the electoral votes to formalize Biden's victory. After the attack, the U.S. House of Representatives impeached Trump for incitement of insurrection. The article of impeachment adopted by the House notes the Raffensperger call, stating: "President Trump's conduct on January 6, 2021, followed his prior efforts to subvert and obstruct the certification of the results of the 2020 Presidential election. Those prior efforts included a phone call on January 2, 2021, during which President Trump urged the Secretary of State of Georgia, Brad Raffensperger, to 'find' enough votes to overturn the Georgia Presidential election results and threatened Secretary Raffensperger if he failed to do so."

Raffensperger testified in public hearings before the United States House Select Committee on the January 6 Attack on June 21, 2022.

=== 2022 election ===
Raffensperger was reelected to a second term in 2022. Trump had endorsed a primary challenger Jody Hice, a supporter of his election fraud claims. Facing punitive opposition by the former president, death threats, harassment, and having to confront misinformation and lies asserted by an opponent, Raffensperger explained his motivation to run for reelection: "If the good walk off the field and leave the field to the bad, then the bad wins."

Raffensperger fended off his primary challengers, ultimately winning the 50% of the votes needed to avoid a runoff. He defeated the Democratic Party nominee, Democratic state representative Bee Nguyen, in the November general election.

A week after the Senate runoff election he called for the Assembly to end the runoff system in Georgia, one of only two states with such a system.

=== 2024 election ===
In early 2023, Georgia's state legislature denied a $25 million request by Raffensperger to implement the 2022 security update for Dominion Voting Systems machines before the 2024 elections, though the QR codes will be eliminated by 2026. According to POLITICO in June of 2023, Raffensperger insisted that the cybersecurity flaws identified in voting software were not significant and that no update was needed since the hackers would need physical access to the machines, over the objection of some cybersecurity experts who insist that a voter-verifiable print-out of the ballot and updating to the latest software are important steps that should have been taken for security reasons and to bolster confidence in the final tally.

On July 29, 2024, Raffensberger added another way to cancel a voter's registration through an online portal, which groups like Fair Fight Action worried would be abused. On August 5, cybersecurity researcher Jason Parker disclosed a vulnerability in Georgia’s voter cancellation portal that allowed users to bypass the requirement for a driver’s license number, enabling the submission of voter registration cancellations with minimal, publicly available information. The discovery drew attention to weaknesses in the system and the importance of continued efforts to secure election infrastructure.

After an administrative law judge disqualified Claudia De la Cruz and Cornel West from the ballot due to their electors not registering in their own name, Raffensperger overruled the judge on August 29, 2024, and put them on the ballot. It is the first time since 1946 with more than four candidates on the ballot. On September 12, 2024, a judge disqualified both West and De la Cruz from running for president in Georgia. On September 25, the Georgia Supreme Court unanimously confirmed the ruling keeping votes for De la Cruz and West from counting even though Raffensperger intended to keep both on the ballot saying there was not enough time to reprint the ballots. Republicans had been working to get West and De la Cruz on the ballot believing they would take votes away from Kamala Harris, while Democrats had been working to keep them off citing how their presence benefits Trump.

=== 2026 Georgia gubernatorial campaign ===
On September 17, 2025, Raffensperger announced his candidacy for the Republican nomination for Governor of Georgia in the 2026 election. He finished third in the primary, behind Rick Jackson and Burt Jones.

== Electoral history ==
2018 Georgia Secretary of State election Republican primary results
| Party | Candidate | Votes | % |
|---|---|---|---|
| Republican | Brad Raffensperger | 185,386 | 34.96 |
| Republican | David Belle Isle | 151,328 | 28.54 |
| Republican | Joshua McKoon | 112,113 | 21.14 |
| Republican | Buzz Brockway | 81,492 | 15.37 |
| Total votes | | 530,319 | 100.00 |

2018 Georgia Secretary of State election Republican primary runoff results
| Party | Candidate | Votes | % |
|---|---|---|---|
| Republican | Brad Raffensperger | 331,127 | 61.74 |
| Republican | David Belle Isle | 205,223 | 38.26 |
| Total votes | | 536,350 | 100.00 |

2018 Georgia Secretary of State election
| Party | Candidate | Votes | % |
|---|---|---|---|
| Republican | Brad Raffensperger | 1,906,588 | 49.09 |
| Democratic | John Barrow | 1,890,310 | 48.67 |
| Libertarian | Smythe DuVal | 86,696 | 2.23 |
| Total votes | | 3,883,594 | 100.00 |

2018 Georgia Secretary of State runoff election
| Party | Candidate | Votes | % |
|---|---|---|---|
| Republican | Brad Raffensperger | 764,855 | 51.89 |
| Democratic | John Barrow | 709,049 | 48.11 |
| Total votes | | 1,473,904 | 100.00 |

2022 Georgia Secretary of State election Republican primary results
| Party | Candidate | Votes | % |
|---|---|---|---|
| Republican | Brad Raffensperger (incumbent) | 611,616 | 52.37 |
| Republican | Jody Hice | 389,447 | 33.34 |
| Republican | David Belle Isle | 103,272 | 8.84 |
| Republican | TJ Hudson | 63,646 | 5.45 |
| Total votes | | 1,167,981 | 100.00 |

2022 Georgia Secretary of State election
| Party | Candidate | Votes | % |
|---|---|---|---|
| Republican | Brad Raffensperger (incumbent) | 2,081,241 | 53.23 |
| Democratic | Bee Nguyen | 1,719,922 | 43.99 |
| Libertarian | Ted Metz | 108,884 | 2.78 |
| Total votes | | 3,910,047 | 100.00 |

2026 Georgia gubernatorial election Republican primary
| Party | Candidate | Votes | % |
|---|---|---|---|
| Republican | Burt Jones | 157,569 | 37.45 |
| Republican | Rick Jackson | 145,639 | 34.61 |
| Republican | Brad Raffensperger | 62,872 | 14.94 |
| Republican | Chris Carr | 47,285 | 11.24 |
| Republican | Clark Dean | 2,897 | 0.69 |
| Republican | Gregg Kirkpatrick | 2,325 | 0.55 |
| Republican | Ken Yasger | 1,882 | 0.45 |
| Republican | Thomas Williams | 292 | 0.07 |
| Total votes | | 420,761 | 100.00 |

== Personal life ==
Raffensperger and his wife, Tricia, have three children and two grandchildren. Raffensperger is a member of the North Point Community Church.

Raffensperger has four siblings. Donald Trump has falsely claimed that Raffensperger has a brother, Ron, who "works for China", but Raffensperger's only brother is not named Ron and does not work for or in China. There is a Huawei executive named Ron Raffensperger, but they are not related.

Party political offices
| Preceded by Brian Kemp | Republican nominee for Secretary of State of Georgia; 2018, 2022 | Succeeded by Tim Fleming |
Political offices
| Preceded by Robyn Crittenden | Secretary of State of Georgia; 2019–present | Incumbent |
