= Nathan Crawford Barnett =

American politician (1801–1890)

- The Great Seal of the State of Georgia

Georgia Secretary of State
- In office 1843-1849; 1851-1853; 1861-1868; 1873-1890

Member of the Georgia House of Representatives from the Clarke County district
- In office 1836–1840

Personal details
- Born: June 28, 1801 Columbia County, Georgia
- Died: February 2, 1890 (aged 88) Milledgeville, Georgia
- Spouse: Mary A. Barnett

Military service
- Allegiance: United States of America
- Branch/service: Georgia Militia
- Rank: Colonel

Nathan Crawford Barnett (June 28, 1801 - February 2, 1890) was a state legislator and long serving Secretary of State in the U.S. State of Georgia. He is remembered as the man who twice saved the Great Seal of the State of Georgia.

== Early life ==
Barnett was born in Columbia County, Georgia in 1801 to William Barnett and Ann Crawford Barnett. His father died while Barnett was still quite young, and his widowed mother moved the family to Lexington in Oglethorpe County where he received his education at the Lexington Academy. Barnett married Margaret J. Morton of Clarke County and the couple established a home in Watkinsville, which was the county seat at that time.

Barnett engaged in planting and merchandising, and in 1832 he was elected Surveyor, and assisted in surveying the Cherokee Purchase in the area of present day Roswell, Georgia in preparation for the sixth state administrated land lottery. It was during this time that he was also elected to the position of major in the Georgia Militia. He was subsequently promoted to the rank of colonel, and in that capacity assisted in the Cherokee Removal from Georgia. Col. Barnett's first wife died in 1840, and he remarried shortly thereafter to Mary Ann Cooper.

== Political career ==
=== Georgia House of Representatives ===
In 1836 Col. Barnett was elected to the Georgia House of Representatives. Of the legislative initiatives which he sponsored or supported, during this period, the most notable was one which authorized construction of the Western and Atlantic Railroad. That government-owned railroad was established on December 21, 1836. The city of Atlanta was founded as the end of the W&A, with the terminus marked with the Atlanta Zero Mile Post. The line is still owned by the State of Georgia from Atlanta to CT Tower in Chattanooga. After two terms in the House, Barnett declined to run for re-election, after the illness and death of his first wife in 1840.

=== Secretary of State ===
In 1843, Barnett was elected (by the Georgia State Senate) to the position of Georgia Secretary of State, a position he held for three terms until 1849. He was subsequently elected to another, single, term in 1851. He was again elected to the position for the period 1861-1868, but was removed by the Military Governor at the onset of the Reconstruction era. It is said that Barnett twice saved the Great Seal of the State of Georgia. The first time was when Union troops under William Tecumseh Sherman were about to capture the State Capitol at Milledgeville. Barnett took the seal, and numerous official documents and Acts, and with the assistance of his wife Mary, buried them at his farm. After Sherman's troops marched on, Barnett returned the seal and the documents to the state. In 1866 Barnett again removed the Great Seal from the capitol. General Ruger, who was at that time acting as the Military Governor of Georgia, requested that Barnett affix the seal to an executive act, which Colonel Barnett could not approve. He refused to sanction the papers with the imprint of the seal and as a consequence was removed by General Ruger. Colonel Barnett then took the seal with him to prevent it from falling into the hands of what was considered an illegitimate Carpetbagger government which occupied the state: so that it was never affixed to any of the documents of misrule which followed under the carpetbag government. Since the seal was required, to certify official acts of the state government, the Reconstruction government fabricated a replacement. That replacement was identical in all respects except one. The soldier depicted on the replacement seal held his sword in the wrong hand. The period of the Reconstruction government in Georgia is thus referred to as the "Period of the False Seal". The Great Seal and documents were buried on Barnett's farm, and remained hidden there until 1868, when a new state constitution was enacted and a new government installed. After democrats regained control of state government, Barnett was again elected Secretary of State in 1873. Upon his return to office, both houses of the Legislature voted to present him with a replica of the Executive Seal, which replica is now in Savannah, Georgia, the property of the Georgia Historical Society. Barnett continued to serve as Secretary of State until his death on 2 February 1890. After an 1880 amendment to the state constitution, he became the first Secretary of State to be directly elected. Toward the end of his more than 30 years of service as secretary of state under numerous administrations and into his late 80s, he was said to wear a row of three pairs of glasses. A portrait of Barnett hangs in the office of the Georgia Secretary of State to this day.

== Death and legacy ==
Nathan Crawford Barnett, who was reported to be tall and thin in his youth, at 6'6" in height, died at the age of 89. Only three of Nathan and Mary Barnett's eight children survived into adulthood. Barnett was remembered as a life-long Methodist. The Georgia Capitol (relocated to Atlanta in 1868) was closed February 4, 1890, the day of Colonel Barnett's funeral, held at Milledgeville. The Central Railroad tendered free use of its cars for Colonel Barnett's family and members of the funeral party. Mary A. Barnett died in Atlanta on January 11, 1902, at the age of 82. She was buried in Milledgeville.
