= John Barrow (American politician) =

American politician (born 1955)

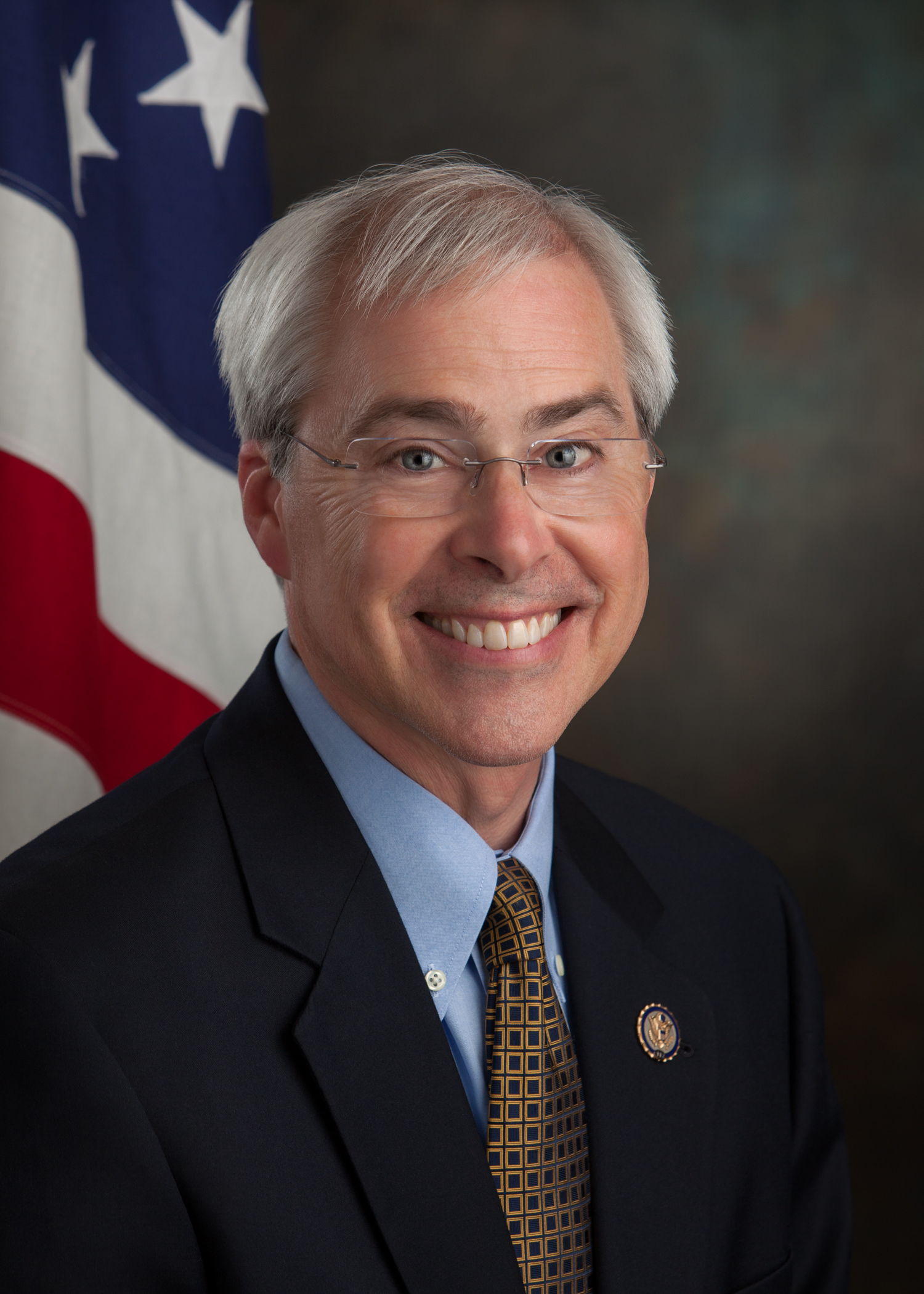
- Official portrait

Member of the U.S. House of Representatives from Georgia's 12th district
- In office January 3, 2005 – January 3, 2015
- Preceded by: Max Burns
- Succeeded by: Rick Allen

Personal details
- Born: John Jenkins Barrow; October 31, 1955 (age 70) Athens, Georgia, U.S.
- Party: Democratic
- Education: University of Georgia (BA); Harvard University (JD)

John Jenkins Barrow (born October 31, 1955) is an American politician who was the U.S. representative for Georgia's 12th congressional district from 2005 to 2015. He is a member of the Democratic Party.

Described as "extraordinarily crafty and unquestionably persistent on the stump," Barrow survived several tough reelection bids in an increasingly Republican district. GOP legislators repeatedly redrew Barrow's district with the explicit intention of complicating his path to reelection, twice forcing him to move to remain within the boundaries of his district. In 2014, Barrow was defeated by Republican Rick Allen in one of that cycle's most closely-watched contests.

Barrow was the Democratic nominee for Georgia Secretary of State in 2018, losing to Republican Brad Raffensperger. In 2024, Barrow ran for a seat on the Supreme Court of Georgia, losing to incumbent Justice Andrew Pinson.

== Education, early career, and family ==
Barrow was born in Athens, Georgia, to Judge James Barrow and his wife, Phyllis (Jenkins) Barrow, who both had served as military officers during World War II. His family has deep roots in the Athens area, and according to his staff he is a great-great-nephew of David Crenshaw Barrow Jr., for whom nearby Barrow County was named. Through his Barrow ancestors he is related to 19th-century Georgia Governor Wilson Lumpkin.

Barrow graduated from the University of Georgia with a political science degree in 1976. While a student, he was a member of the university's Demosthenian Literary Society. In 1979, he earned a Juris Doctor degree from Harvard Law School. After graduation, he entered private practice as a lawyer, working until his election to public office. Barrow is married to the former Angèle Hawkins of Atlanta. Together they have 5 children: Charlie, Manette, Alex, James, and Ruth.

Barrow is a Baptist.

== Athens-Clarke County politics ==
In 1990, voters from the City of Athens and Clarke County voted to consolidate the two governing bodies. Barrow was elected to the newly created Athens-Clarke County Commission, representing the county's fourth district. He won re-election in 1992, 1996, and in 2000.

== U.S. House of Representatives ==
=== Elections ===
==== 2008 ====
Shortly after Barack Obama's victory in the 2008 Georgia Democratic presidential primary, Barrow endorsed Obama for president.

Barrow drew a primary challenge from state Sen. Regina Thomas in 2008, who argued that the congressman voted too frequently with Republicans. Despite the district's substantial Black population, Obama endorsed Barrow over Thomas. Barrow ultimately defeated Thomas in a landslide, calling the outcome "a real victory for those of us who believe that the big things we agree on are more important than the little things that divide us."

He won a third term in November, defeating Republican John Stone by 32 points.

==== 2010 ====
In 2010, Thomas again challenged Barrow in the Democratic primary. She attacked Barrow for his vote against the Affordable Care Act, accusing him of propagating "lies and more lies" by misrepresenting his political stances on the campaign trail. Barrow outspent Thomas by a margin of 21-to-one during the campaign. He defeated Thomas by double digits.

Barrow defeated Republican Ray McKinney in the general election. With his victory, Barrow became the last white Democrat from the Deep South left in the House.

==== 2012 ====
During 2011 redistricting, the Republican-controlled state Legislature sought to gerrymander Barrow out of office by severing liberal Chatham County from his district. The enacted plan replaced it with more conservative counties in the Augusta metropolitan area, turning the 12th District into a seat that would have been carried by Republican John McCain with 59% of the vote in 2008. The new boundaries significantly hindered Barrow's reelection prospects, and The Washington Post named it the second-most gerrymandered district in the nation.

Barrow, a moderate Democrat who frequently bucked his party, remained competitive in the redrawn district nonetheless. He benefited from the lackluster campaign of his GOP opponent, state Rep. Lee Anderson, "whose laid-back and slow-talking demeanor" contrasted with Barrow's aggressive performance on the stump. Barrow defeated Anderson with nearly 54% of the vote.

==== 2014 ====
Despite initial speculation that Barrow would run for the Senate in 2014, he chose to seek a sixth term in the House. Barrow again emerged as a top target for Republicans.

In the general election, Barrow faced Republican construction company owner Rick Allen. Allen successfully unseated Barrow, in large part thanks to ads criticizing Barrow for voting with Obama 85% of the time.

=== Legislation ===
Barrow sponsored 59 bills of his own, including:

==== 109th Congress (2005–2006) ====
- H.R. 2073, a bill to create a tax credit for businesses with no more than 50 employees equal to 50% of the amount paid by the employer for health insurance coverage for the business's employees, introduced May 4, 2005. A version of this tax credit would later be included as part of the Patient Protection and Affordable Care Act (PPACA).
- H.R. 5694, introduced June 28, 2006, reintroduced in the 110th Congress as H.R. 1473, the 111th Congress as H.R. 1662 and the 112th Congress as H.R. 4283, a bill to require states to recommend the purchasing of liability insurance for child care centers, and to require child care centers to disclose whether the center carries current liability insurance 1) publicly and conspicuously in the service area of the premises of the center, and 2) in a written notice to each child's parents or legal guardian. Child care centers would be required to receive a signature from at least one of the child's parents verifying that he or she has received the notice, and would be required to maintain records of these signatures while the child is receiving care and for one year thereafter. While this bill has yet to become law, many states, including Georgia, have adopted their own versions of it.

==== 110th Congress (2007–2008) ====
- H.R. 1563, a bill to require Medicare Advantage organizations to provide at least the same amount provided under Medicare Part A or B if such services had been provided under either of those programs for critical access rural hospitals, introduced March 19, 2007
- H.R. 2398, a bill to create the National Institute of Food and Agriculture to promote research aimed at improving agriculture, introduced June 21, 2007. This bill's provisions were included in the 2008 U.S. farm bill.
- H.R. 3607, a bill to increase the allowable HOPE Scholarship tax credit from $1,000 to $2,000, allow it to be used for four taxable years, and allow it to include expenditures on books, classroom supplies, and housing, introduced September 20, 2007
- H.R. 5897, a bill to create a registry of individuals exposed to excess formaldehyde in the Federal Emergency Management Agency's temporary housing units after Hurricane Katrina, to study the adverse effects of this excess exposure, and to provide free health care and counseling to individuals in the registry who are suffering from adverse effects of excess formaldehyde exposure linked to the temporary housing units, introduced April 24, 2008, reintroduced in the 111th Congress as H.R. 1661
- H.R. 5918, a bill to create a program to make it easier for small businesses to provide health insurance coverage to their employees, introduced April 29, 2008. A version of this program would later be included as the PPACA's Small Business Health Options Program.

==== 111th Congress (2009–2010) ====
- H.R. 3652, a bill to require the Secretary of Health and Human Services to create minimum education and certification standards for physicians who administer medical imaging and radiation therapy, introduced September 25, 2009
- H.R. 5594, a bill to create a program to award competitive grants to technical schools to pay for up to $2,000 in tuition costs for unemployed individuals enrolled or accepted at the school, introduced June 24, 2010, reintroduced in the 112th Congress as H.R. 2851

==== 112th Congress (2011–2012) ====
- H.R. 3121, a bill to require Congress to approve of any contract, grant, or loan awarded to any entity from the federal government if its value exceeds $100 million for a single fiscal year, introduced October 6, 2011
- H.R. 4167, a bill to create a refundable tax credit for businesses whose employees' average wages rise in excess of inflation to partially offset these costs, up to a maximum of $500,000 per calendar year, introduced March 8, 2012
- H.R. 6144, a bill to reduce the allowable amount of expenditures on new vehicles for federal employees, excluding vehicles acquired for national security purposes, introduced September 18, 2012
- H.R. 6499, a bill to subject the pay of members of Congress to budgetary cuts under the Gramm–Rudman–Hollings Balanced Budget Act, introduced September 21, 2012

==== 113th Congress (2013–2014) ====
- H.R. 37, introduced January 3, 2013, a bill to repeal the employer mandate, individual mandate, and the Independent Payment Advisory Board of the PPACA, to prohibit the Environmental Protection Agency from awarding any type of financial assistance to any entity for the purpose of preventing or controlling air pollution if that financial assistance would be used outside of the United States, and to grant the Office of Management and Budget the authority to consolidate existing government agencies and programs if doing so would increase government efficiency. H.R. 37 also contains modified provisions of some bills sponsored by Barrow in the 112th Congress: H.R. 3121, 6144, and 6499.
- H.R. 223, a bill to prohibit states from redrawing congressional districts more than once after each 10-year reapportionment unless ordered to do so by a court so that the districts comply with the U.S. Constitution and the Voting Rights Act of 1965, introduced January 14, 2013
- H.R. 4331, a bill to reduce the number of limousines in the federal vehicle fleet by 50%, introduced March 27, 2014
- H.R. 4591, introduced May 7, 2014, a bill to direct the Secretary of Labor to develop a strategy to deal with the country's skill gap (which the bill defines). H.R. 4591 also contains modified provisions of some bills sponsored by Barrow in the 111th and 112th Congresses: H.R. 5594 and 4167.

=== Committee assignments ===
- Committee on Energy and Commerce
  - Subcommittee on Environment and Economy
  - Subcommittee on Commerce, Manufacturing and Trade
  - Subcommittee on Energy and Power
  - Subcommittee on Health

== Political campaigns ==
=== 2018 ===
While considered to be a potential candidate for Governor of Georgia in the 2018 election, Barrow decided instead to pursue the office of Georgia Secretary of State. He announced his candidacy on September 24, 2017 and won the Democratic primary. Neither Barrow nor his Republican opponent, Brad Raffensperger, received 50% of the vote in the 2018 general election, so a run-off election was held. In that election, Barrow lost by 55,806 votes.

=== 2020 ===
In 2019, Barrow announced his intention to run for a seat on the Supreme Court of Georgia. The election was controversially canceled by Secretary of State Brad Raffensperger after outgoing Justice Keith R. Blackwell announced his intention to resign from his position before his term was complete. Blackwell's decision allowed Governor Brian Kemp to appoint a successor, which Kemp argued rendered an election unnecessary. Barrow sued in state court to force an election, but Raffensperger's decision to cancel the election was upheld by the state Supreme Court in a 6–2 vote.

=== 2024 ===
Final results by county: Pinson: 50–60%; 60–70%; 70–80%; Barrow: 50–60%; 60–70%; 70–80%; Tie

On May 21, 2024, John Barrow lost the Georgia Supreme Court election against sitting Justice Andrew Pinson by a 10-point margin.

== Political views ==
Barrow is a Blue Dog Democrat as well as a member of the New Democrat Coalition. Based on Barrow's bill sponsorship, the GovTrack website had classified him as a centrist Democrat. Following the defeat of fellow Georgia Democrat Jim Marshall in 2010, he was the only white Democratic congressman from the Deep South.

Barrow got a 75% rating from the NAACP, which indicates a "mixed record" on civil rights; 83% from U.S. Border Control, indicating a "sealed-border stance"; 25% from Americans United for Separation of Church and State, indicating a "mixed record on church-state separation"; 0% from Citizens for Tax Justice, indicating opposition to progressive tax structure; 100% from the Campaign for America's Future, indicating support for energy independence; -10 from NORML, indicating a "hard-on-drugs" stance; 36% from the National Right to Life Committee, indicating a mixed record on abortion.

=== Abortion ===
Barrow has a mixed record on abortion. In 2005, Barrow voted for the Child Interstate Abortion Notification Act. The legislation would have punished any individual who helped transport a minor across state lines to obtain an abortion without receiving proper parental consent. He was one of 54 Democrats to support the measure, which was not enacted.

NARAL Pro-Choice America gave Barrow a 100% rating in 2013, citing his votes against the Pain-Capable Unborn Child Protection Act and legislation intended to make it easier for insurance providers to deny birth control.

While campaigning for a seat on the Supreme Court of Georgia in 2024, Barrow said, "I believe that abortion rights are protected by the Georgia Constitution, and I believe the federal Constitution allows me to say that."

=== Gun rights ===
In 2012, Barrow aired an ad that touted his support for the Second Amendment. The spot featured Barrow displaying his own weapons and pledging, "Ain't nobody gonna take them away."

Barrow ran for reelection in 2014 with the endorsement of the NRA Political Victory Fund, which praised him for standing "strong against the Obama-Bloomberg gun control agenda."

=== Healthcare ===
Barrow voted against both the first and final drafts of the Affordable Care Act. He argued that the legislation put "too much of the burden of paying for it on working folks who are already being overcharged" and expressed concerns that the bill would "overwhelm" Medicaid.

=== LGBT rights ===
Barrow was one of 34 Democrats to vote for the Federal Marriage Amendment in 2006, which sought to define marriage as being between one man and one woman. Four years later, he voted for the Don't Ask, Don't Tell Repeal Act of 2010, which allowed LGBT Americans to serve openly in the United States Armed Forces.

=== Stimulus spending ===
Barrow voted for the American Recovery and Reinvestment Act. He was one of 44 Democrats in the House to vote against the American Clean Energy and Security Act, also known as the cap and trade bill.

=== Intellectual property ===
In 2011, Rep. Barrow became a co-sponsor of Bill H.R.3261 otherwise known as the Stop Online Piracy Act.

U.S. House of Representatives
Preceded by Max Burns	Member of the U.S. House of Representatives from Georgia's 12th congressional district 2005–2015	Succeeded by Rick W. Allen
Party political offices
Preceded by Baron Hill	Chair of the Blue Dog Coalition for Policy; 2011–2013; Served alongside: Heath Shuler (Administration), Mike Ross (Communications)	Succeeded by Jim Cooper
Preceded by Heath Shuler	Chair of the Blue Dog Coalition for Administration; 2013–2015; Served alongside: Kurt Schrader (Communications), Jim Cooper (Policy)	Succeeded by Kurt Schrader
Preceded by Doreen Carter	Democratic nominee for Secretary of State of Georgia; 2018	Succeeded by Bee Nguyen
U.S. order of precedence (ceremonial)
Preceded by Lindsay Thomas as Former U.S. Representative	Order of precedence of the United States as Former U.S. Representative	Succeeded by Tom Graves as Former U.S. Representative
