= Tim Fleming (politician) =

American politician (born 1982)

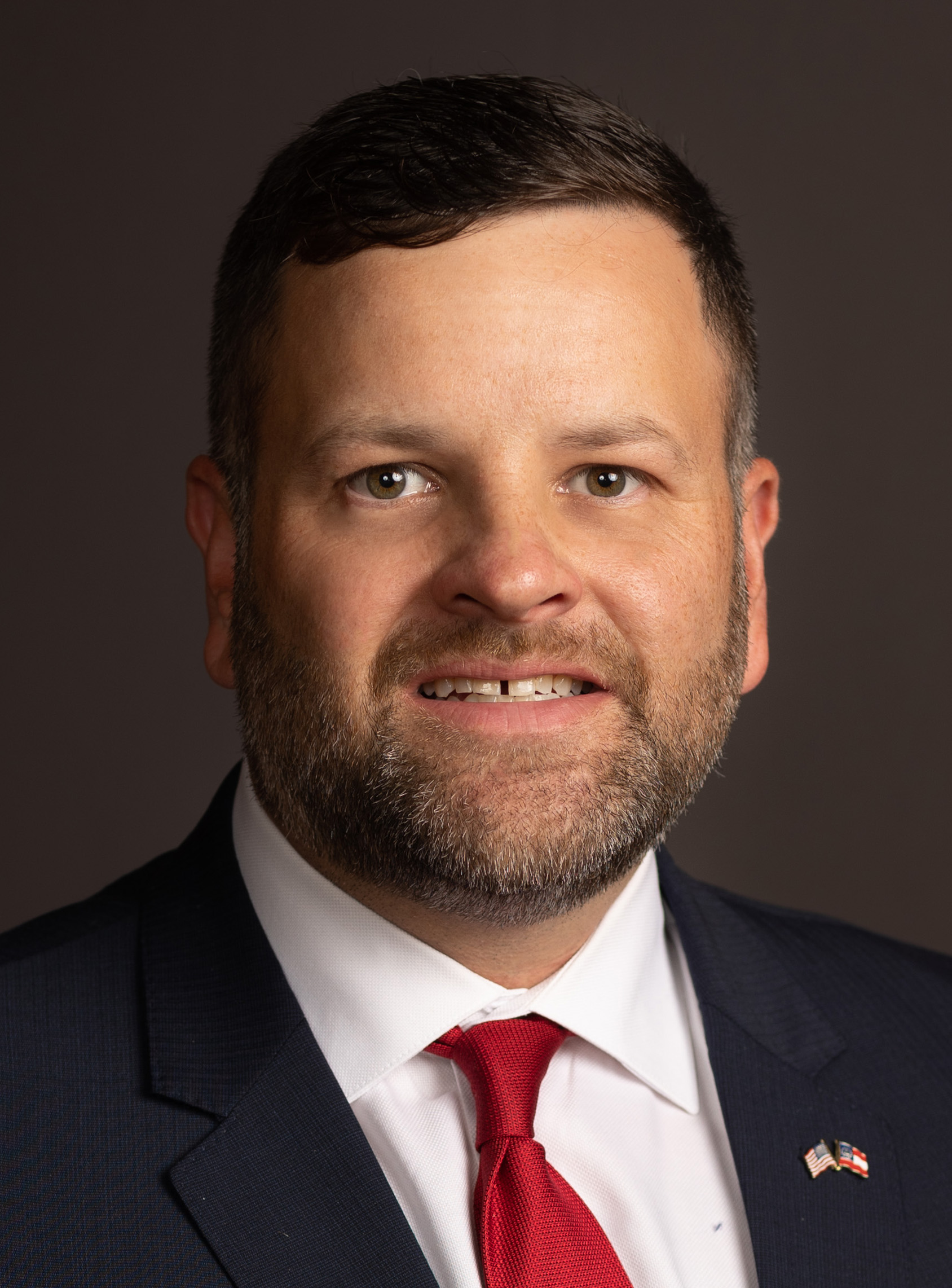
- Official portrait, 2025

Member of the Georgia House of Representatives from the 114th district
- Incumbent
- Assumed office January 9, 2023
- Preceded by: Dave Belton (redistricted)

Member of the Newton County Board of Commissioners
- In office January 1, 2009 – December 31, 2012
- Preceded by: Monty Laster
- Succeeded by: Levie Maddox
- Constituency: 5th district

Personal details
- Born: Timothy Kyle Fleming; August 19, 1982 (age 44)
- Party: Republican
- Spouse: Lacey Foisy (m. 2007)
- Children: 3
- Education: Georgia Perimeter College (AA); University of Georgia (BA)
- Website: State house website Campaign website

Timothy Kyle Fleming (born August 19, 1982) is an American politician serving as a member of the Georgia House of Representatives for the 114th district. He is a member of the Republican Party. Prior to being elected to the Georgia House of Representatives, Fleming was the Newton County commissioner from 2009 to 2013 and the chief of staff for Governor Brian Kemp.

In July 2025, Fleming announced his candidacy for the 2026 Georgia Secretary of State election. While he won the Republican primary, he was defeated by Penny Brown Reynolds in the November general election. Fleming has stated that there were "irregularities" in Georgia's 2020 presidential election.
