= Fair Fight Action =

American organization advocating voting rights

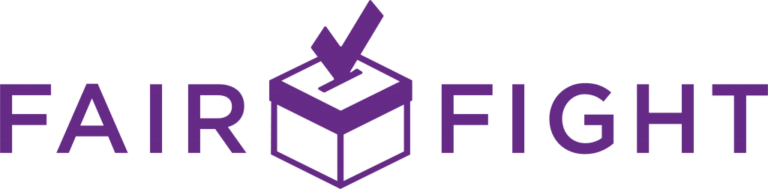
- Founded: 2018
- Founders: Stacey Abrams
- Registration no.: C00693515 a Hybrid PAC; 471427359 a 501(c)(4)
- Headquarters: Atlanta, Georgia, U.S.
- Executive Director: Lauren Groh-Wargo
- Website: fairfight.com

Fair Fight Action is an American political organization founded in 2018 by Stacey Abrams to address voter suppression in Georgia and across the United States.

== Origins ==
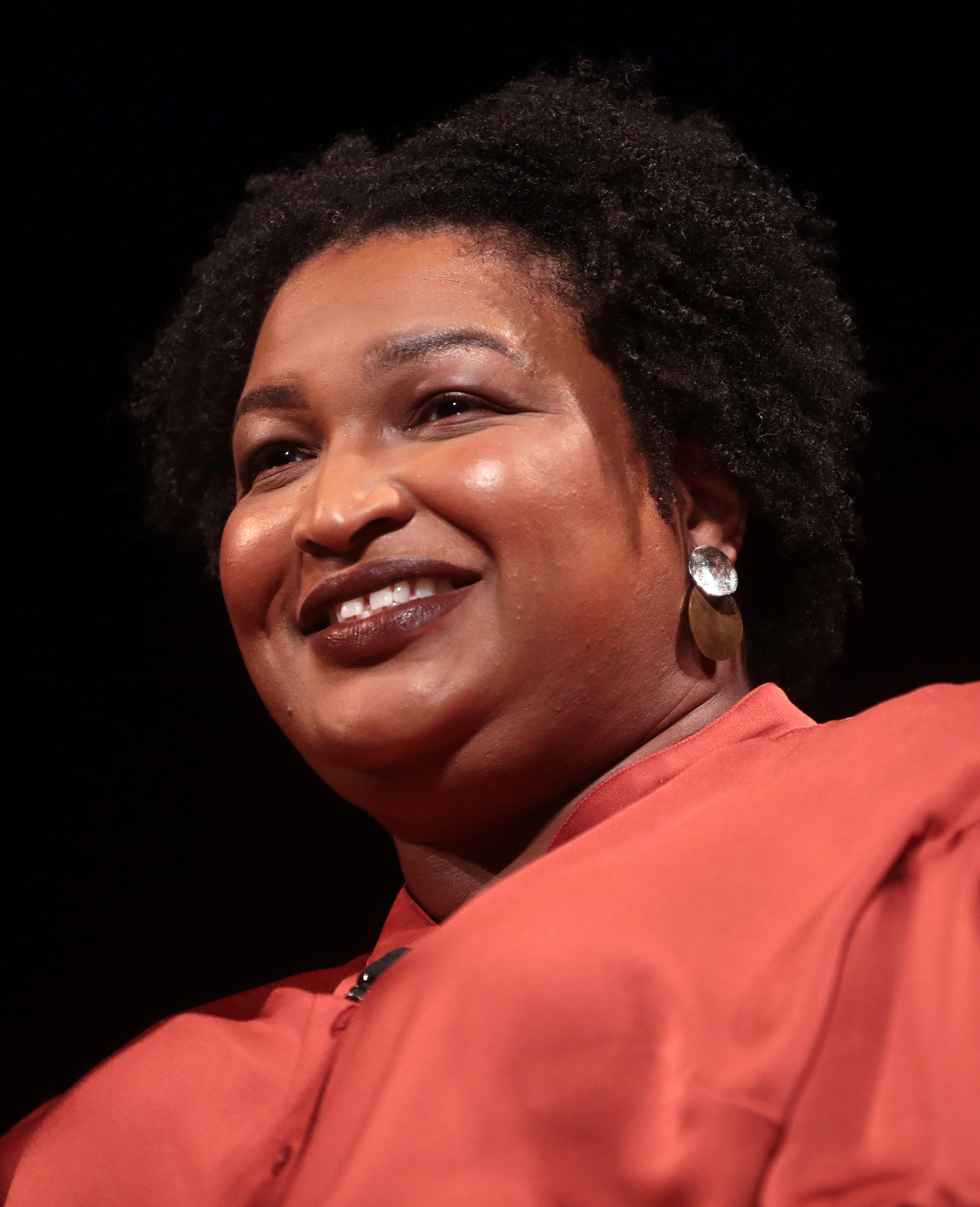
Fair Fight Action founder, Stacey Abrams in 2021

Stacey Abrams had long been involved with the Democratic Party, serving as a member of the Georgia House of Representatives since 2007, and was the minority leader 2011–2017. In 2018 Abrams ran for Governor of Georgia against Republican Brian Kemp. The 2018 gubernatorial race received national attention for alleged irregularities in voter access to the ballot. At the time, Kemp was serving as Secretary of State and was responsible for the state's voter rolls. He stalled 50,000 votes while he held this position. Civil rights groups interpreted this as intentional voter suppression since his action affected predominantly black voters. In the aftermath of her loss to Kemp, Abrams established Fair Fight Action, "after witnessing the gross mismanagement of the 2018 election by the Secretary of State's office." Abrams decided not to run for president and instead commit to this interest group in the 2020 election. In 2021, Abrams announced to run again for governor in the 2022 election.

In 2019, Abrams created Fair Fight 2020, an initiative aimed at monitoring voting practices in key battleground states.

== Goals and initiatives ==
Fair Fight Action aims to make elections in Georgia and the rest of the U.S. more equitable by advocating for changes in voter registration laws that will increase the number of eligible voters. Their goals are to encourage voter turnout and to ensure that all votes are accurately counted. They also want to make absentee ballots more consistent. Abrams has stated she will "use my energies and my very loud voice to raise the money we need to train those across the country in our 20 battleground states".

Fair Fight Action joined the Voter Empowerment Task Force, which is composed of other civil rights groups such as GA NAACP, Black Voters Matter Fund, and the Georgia Coalition for People's Agenda. The coalition's mission was to fight voter intimidation and Raffensperger's task force. The organization has also condemned Brian Kemp's signing of House Bill 838, which further strengthened protections for first responders, including police officers. Fair Fight Action believes that this legislation will only make black people more vulnerable to corrupt officers.

The 2020 presidential election brought national attention to the state of Georgia. Georgia was one of the swing states that potentially determined the outcome of the election. Former Vice President Joe Biden won the state by a razor-thin lead over President Donald Trump. Many have credited her for not only turning Georgia into a blue state, but for Fair Fight Action's influence on voter turnout in 20 other states, including crucial states such as Michigan, Wisconsin, North Carolina, and Pennsylvania. Thus, she has been praised for playing a significant role in Biden's win by bringing in more voters from marginalized communities.

Fair Fight Action has raised $6 million to support Reverend Raphael Warnock and Jon Ossoff in the Georgia Senate runoff elections that were held on January 5, 2021. Fair Fight Action works with the non-partisan VoteRiders organization to spread state-specific information on voter ID requirements. Warnock and Ossoff both won their races, flipping the control of the Senate to the Democrats.

In July 2025, the organization launched a tool to make it easier for voters in Georgia to check and see if they are on the list to be removed from the voter registration list. Earlier that month, 480,000 voters received a letter with a warning that their voter registration could be canceled if there was no response.

== Legal action ==
In August 2019, Fair Fight Action sued the Georgia Secretary of State's office over what they consider to be unconstitutional voting issues. Fair Fight Action was a party to the court case Curling v. Raffensperger which ordered the state of Georgia to dispose of all old Diebold voting machines prior to Georgia's 2020 presidential preference primary in March. The lawsuit initially alleged that voting lines and wait times were too long, that voter ID laws discriminated against people of color, that "exact match" policies for voter names and addresses were racially discriminatory, that voter rolls were being improperly maintained, and that voting machines were vulnerable to being hacked and were switching votes from Abrams to Kemp. These claims gradually narrowed to three before being rejected in federal court.

In December 2020, Fair Fight Action filed a lawsuit again True the Vote, alleging voter intimidation ahead of the January 2021 U.S. Senate runoff election. In January 2024, U.S. District Judge Steven C. Jones ruled in favor of True the Vote and Fair Fight Action appealed the ruling to the U.S. Court of Appeals for the Eleventh Circuit. The appeal remains pending.

== See also ==
- Voting Rights Act of 1965
