= Georgia Secretary of State =

Statewide executive office in Georgia, United States

- Great Seal of the State of Georgia

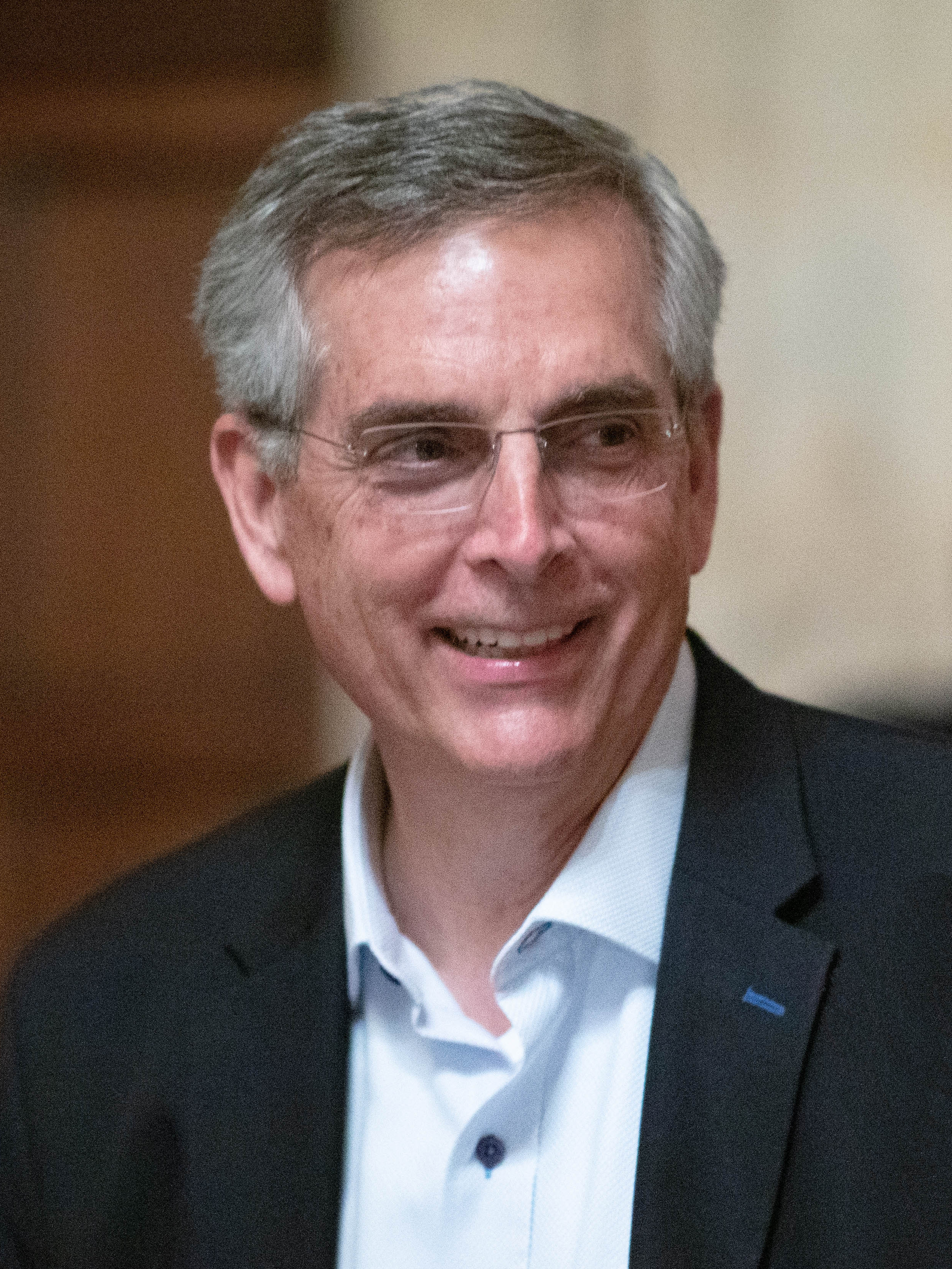
- Incumbent; Brad Raffensperger since January 14, 2019
- Term length: 4 years
- First holder: John Milton
- Website: sos.ga.gov

The secretary of state of the U.S. state of Georgia is an elected official with a wide variety of responsibilities, including supervising elections and maintaining public records.

The office has had a four-year term since 1946. Before 1880, the secretary of state was elected by the Georgia Assembly, not in a popular election.

== List of secretaries of state of Georgia ==
#	Image	Name	Party	Took office	Left office
1		John Milton		1777	1799
2		Horatio Marbury		1799	1811
3		Abner Hammond		1811	1823
4		Everard Hamilton		1823	1833
5		William A. Tennille		1833	1843
6		Nathan Crawford Barnett		1843	1849
7		George Washington Harrison		1849	1851
8		Nathan Crawford Barnett		1851	1853
9		Elihu P. Watkins		1853	1861
10		Nathan Crawford Barnett		1861	1868
11		David G. Cotting	Republican	1868	1873
12		Nathan Crawford Barnett	Democratic	1873	1890 ^{a}
13		Philip Cook Sr.	Democratic	1890	1894 ^{a}
14		Allen D. Candler	Democratic	1894	1898
15		William C. Clifton		1898	1898
16		Philip Cook Jr.	Democratic	1898	1918 ^{a}
17		Henry Bascomb Strange		1918	1919
18		Samuel Guyton McLendon		1919	1928 ^{a}
19		George Henry Carswell	Democratic	1928	1931
20		John Bryan Wilson	Democratic	1931	1946 ^{a}
21		Benjamin W. Fortson Jr.	Democrat	1946	1979 ^{a}
22		David Bryan Poythress	Democratic	1979	1983
23		Joseph Maxwell Cleland	Democratic	1983	1996
24		Lewis A. Massey	Democratic	1996	1999
25		Lera Catharine Cox	Democratic	1999	2007
26		Karen Handel	Republican	2007	2010
27		Brian Kemp	Republican	2010	2018
28		Robyn Crittenden	Republican	2018	2019
29		Brad Raffensperger	Republican	2019	Incumbent
30		Penny Brown Reynolds	Democratic	2027	Elect

(a) Died in office

== See also ==
- Georgia Attorney General
