= Rockdale County, Georgia =

County in Georgia, United States

- County
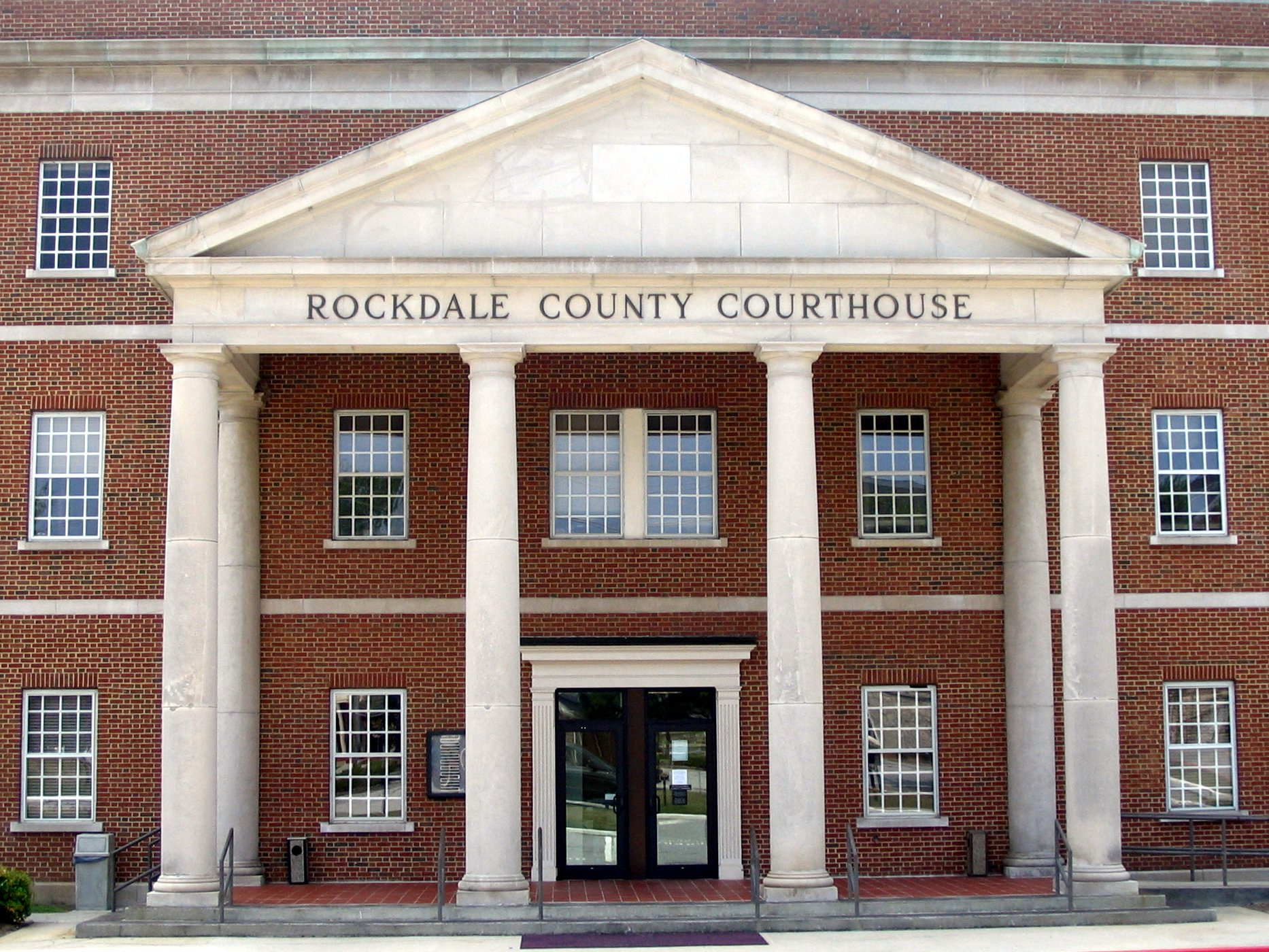
- Rockdale County Courthouse in Conyers

- Flag Seal

- Location within the U.S. state of Georgia
- Coordinates: 33°39′N 84°02′W
- Country: United States
- State: Georgia
- Founded: October 18, 1870; 156 years ago
- Named for: Rockdale Baptist Church
- Seat: Conyers
- Largest city: Conyers

Government
  - Chair & Chief Executive Officer: JaNice Van Ness (D)

Area
  - Total: 132 sq mi (340 km^{2})
  - Land: 130 sq mi (340 km^{2})
  - Water: 2.3 sq mi (6.0 km^{2}) 1.7%

Population (2020)
  - Total: 93,570
  - Estimate (2025): 98,416 ▲
  - Density: 720/sq mi (280/km^{2})
- Time zone: UTC−5 (Eastern)
  - Summer (DST): UTC−4 (EDT)
- Congressional district: 13th
- Website: rockdalecountyga.gov

Rockdale County is a county located in the North Central portion in the U.S. state of Georgia. As of the 2020 census, the population was 93,570 up from 85,215 in 2010. The county seat and only incorporated city in the county is Conyers. Rockdale County is included in Metro Atlanta area and is located approximately 25 miles east of downtown Atlanta.

Founded in 1870, the county developed historically as a largely rural community but experienced substantial population growth and suburbanization during the late 20th and early 21st centuries as the Atlanta metropolitan area expanded eastward.

== History ==
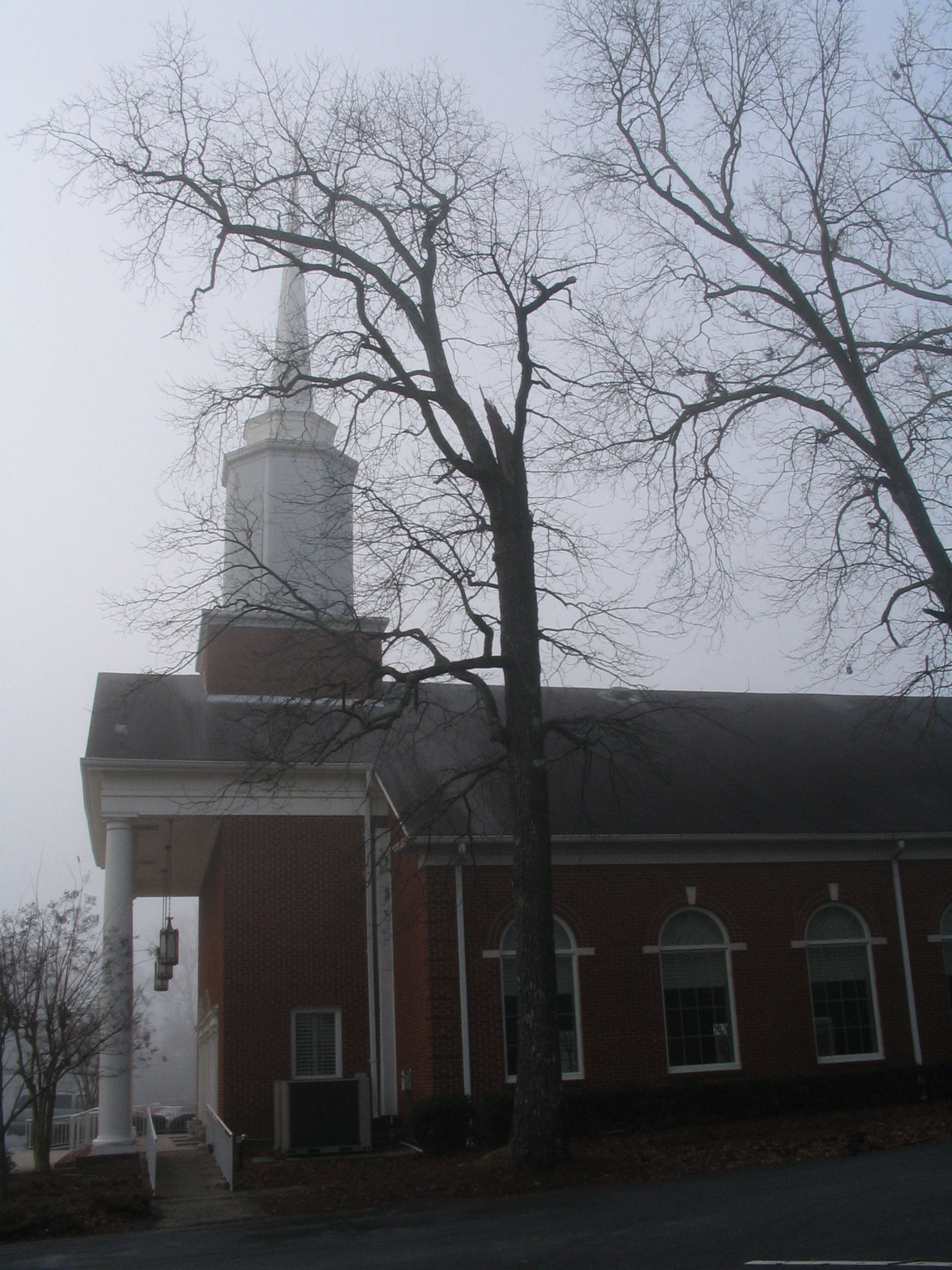
Rockdale Baptist Church

Rockdale County was formed on October 18, 1870 and received its name from Rockdale Baptist Church (est. May 29, 1847), which was named after the granite strata that rests under the county's red clay top soil. A bill introduced by John F. Hardin and John Harris carved Rockdale out of the northern portion of Newton County; parts of Rockdale County also came from neighboring Henry, Walton, Gwinnett, and DeKalb counties. Conyers, Rockdale's only incorporated town and urban center, became the county seat.

Prior to Rockdale becoming a county, the land had been inhabited by the Creek and Cherokee; the boundary between the two native nations, the Hightower Trail, ran directly through the area. Burial remains have been discovered in the Honey Creek and Hi-Roc areas. Whites began migrating to the area in the early 19th century and initial white settlers suffered from Indian raids. Early white settlements developed along Big Haynes Creek in the northern part of the county, the Yellow River in the middle portion of the county, and Honey Creek in the south.

Communities formed around grist mills and newly formed churches such as Haralson Mill, Costleys Mill, Dial Mill, Zacharys Mill, McElroys Mill, Union Grove Baptist Church, Ebenezer Methodist Church, Philadelphia Methodist Church, Salem Baptist Church, Smyrna Presbyterian Church, Pleasant Hill Baptist Church, Bethel Christian Church, Honey Creek Baptist Church, and Whites Chapel Methodist Church. Other communities included Magnet and Zingara. These settlers were largely subsistence farmers.

During the American Civil War, General William Tecumseh Sherman marched the Union Army north of Conyers on his way to Covington from Lithonia. Seizure and destruction of property accompanied his army's march through the area. Many of the residents of Conyers, fearing Sherman would raze the city, fled to nearby Social Circle in Walton County, since Conyers was an important stop on the Georgia Railroad, but Conyers remained unscathed by the war.

The city is a fine example of residential and commercial architecture of the 19th century. According to a historical marker on U.S. Highway 278 west of Conyers, Major General Joseph Wheeler of the Confederate States Army and part of his staff were captured by Union troops pursuing Jefferson Davis on May 9, 1865. Wheeler was later released in Athens only to be recaptured again. He was wounded three times and had his horse shot out from under him sixteen times.

During Reconstruction, Conyers and Rockdale County experienced tremendous growth. According to the local newspaper, The Weekly Farmer, the population of Conyers increased from 300 to 2,000. The number of stores, businesses, schools, and churches of the county rapidly multiplied as well. Parts of the county were infamous for moonshining and the county became dry in 1882, prohibiting the sale and manufacture of liquor except by a licensed pharmacist as prescribed by a physician. The economy of the county was still based primarily on agriculture into the early 20th century. The PBS documentary The Lost Children of Rockdale County is about a syphilis outbreak which occurred in the county during the 1990s.

Rockdale County continued to be primarily rural in nature until the construction of I-20 in the 1960s, and it was added to Atlanta's metropolitan statistical area in the 1970 census. As late as 2000, the county had a white majority, but by 2020, whites only accounted for 27% of the county's population. This is partially attributed to the "new great migration", as the county's growth has coincided with strong growth in its black population. The county became majority-black in 2013.

== Geography ==
According to the U.S. Census Bureau, the county has a total area of 132 square miles (340 km^{2}), of which 130 square miles (340 km^{2}) is land and 2.3 square miles (6.0 km^{2}) (1.7%) is water. It is the second-smallest county in Georgia by area, ahead of Clarke County.

The entirety of Rockdale County is located in the Upper Ocmulgee River sub-basin of the Altamaha River basin.

=== Adjacent counties ===
- Newton County – Southeast
- Henry County – southwest
- DeKalb County – west
- Walton County – northeast
- Gwinnett County – north

== Communities ==
=== City ===
- Conyers

=== Census-designated places ===
- Lakeview Estates
- Milstead

== Demographics ==
Historical population
Census	Pop.	Note	%±
1880	6,838		—
1890	6,813		−0.4%
1900	7,515		10.3%
1910	8,916		18.6%
1920	9,521		6.8%
1930	7,247		−23.9%
1940	7,724		6.6%
1950	8,464		9.6%
1960	10,572		24.9%
1970	18,152		71.7%
1980	36,747		102.4%
1990	54,091		47.2%
2000	70,111		29.6%
2010	85,215		21.5%
2020	93,570		9.8%
2025 (est.)	98,416	▲	5.2%
U.S. Decennial Census; 1790-1880 1890-1910; 1920-1930 1930-1940; 1940-1950 1960-1980; 1980-2000 2010 2020

=== Racial and ethnic composition ===
Rockdale County, Georgia – Racial and ethnic composition Note: the US Census treats Hispanic/Latino as an ethnic category. This table excludes Latinos from the racial categories and assigns them to a separate category. Hispanics/Latinos may be of any race.
Race / Ethnicity (NH = Non-Hispanic)	Pop 1980	Pop 1990	Pop 2000	Pop 2010	Pop 2020	% 1980	% 1990	% 2000	% 2010	% 2020
White alone (NH)	33,050	48,539	50,967	34,826	24,500	89.94%	89.74%	72.69%	40.87%	26.18%
Black or African American alone (NH)	3,145	4,330	12,670	38,996	53,785	8.56%	8.01%	18.07%	45.76%	57.48%
Native American or Alaska Native alone (NH)	181	111	166	179	168	0.49%	0.21%	0.24%	0.21%	0.18%
Asian alone (NH)	112	505	1,339	1,498	1,532	0.30%	0.93%	1.91%	1.76%	1.64%
Native Hawaiian or Pacific Islander alone (NH)	x	x	36	52	72	x	x	0.05%	0.06%	0.08%
Other race alone (NH)	8	12	100	230	617	0.02%	0.02%	0.14%	0.27%	0.66%
Mixed race or Multiracial (NH)	x	x	651	1,371	3,356	x	x	0.93%	1.61%	3.59%
Hispanic or Latino (any race)	251	594	4,182	8,063	9,540	0.68%	1.10%	5.96%	9.46%	10.20%
Total	36,747	54,091	70,111	85,215	93,570	100.00%	100.00%	100.00%	100.00%	100.00%

=== 2020 census ===
As of the 2020 census, there were 93,570 people, 33,114 households, and 23,533 families residing in the county.

The median age was 39.7 years; 23.6% of residents were under the age of 18, and 15.5% were 65 years of age or older. For every 100 females there were 88.7 males, and for every 100 females age 18 and over there were 85.6 males age 18 and over.

Eighty-six point three percent of residents lived in urban areas, while 13.7% lived in rural areas.

The racial makeup of the county was 27.4% White, 58.1% Black or African American, 0.3% American Indian and Alaska Native, 1.6% Asian, 0.1% Native Hawaiian and Pacific Islander, 5.7% from some other race, and 6.6% from two or more races. Hispanic or Latino residents of any race comprised 10.2% of the population.

Of the 33,114 households, 35.2% had children under the age of 18 living with them and 32.7% had a female householder with no spouse or partner present. About 22.4% of all households were made up of individuals and 8.5% had someone living alone who was 65 years of age or older.

There were 35,427 housing units, of which 6.5% were vacant. Among occupied housing units, 67.9% were owner-occupied and 32.1% were renter-occupied. The homeowner vacancy rate was 2.2% and the rental vacancy rate was 7.3%.

=== 2010 census ===
In 2010, the median income for a household in the county was $53,599, and the median income for a family was $60,065. Males had a median income of $41,087 versus $29,189 for females. The per capita income for the county was $22,300. About 5.70% of families and 8.20% of the population were below the poverty line, including 10.00% of those under age 18 and 7.70% of those age 65 or over.

== Government and politics ==
A former Republican stronghold, Rockdale County has undergone a massive shift towards the Democratic Party in recent decades, primarily due to large growth of the African-American population. In 2000, Republican presidential nominee George W. Bush won 62.64% of the county's vote, defeating Democrat Al Gore by 29 percentage points. However, just 20 years later, Democratic nominee Joe Biden won 69.88% of the county's vote, defeating Republican incumbent Donald Trump by nearly 41 percentage points.

Contrary to national and statewide trends, Rockdale County delivered a larger margin for Democratic nominee Kamala Harris in 2024, who defeated Republican nominee Donald Trump by 48 percentage points even as Trump flipped the state of Georgia back to the GOP column. Rockdale County is one of nine counties that shifted more than 25 percentage points to the left from 2012 to 2024.

United States presidential election results for Rockdale County, Georgia
Year	Republican		Democratic		Third party(ies)	
Year	No.	%	No.	%	No.	%
1912	51	10.32%	432	87.45%	11	2.23%
1916	56	9.05%	490	79.16%	73	11.79%
1920	201	29.17%	488	70.83%	0	0.00%
1924	24	5.53%	382	88.02%	28	6.45%
1928	156	24.84%	472	75.16%	0	0.00%
1932	18	3.73%	461	95.45%	4	0.83%
1936	73	8.01%	837	91.88%	1	0.11%
1940	86	6.23%	1,291	93.55%	3	0.22%
1944	96	9.21%	946	90.79%	0	0.00%
1948	146	9.86%	1,209	81.63%	126	8.51%
1952	321	16.16%	1,665	83.84%	0	0.00%
1956	484	21.39%	1,779	78.61%	0	0.00%
1960	496	21.94%	1,765	78.06%	0	0.00%
1964	1,503	43.25%	1,972	56.75%	0	0.00%
1968	1,195	25.85%	1,213	26.24%	2,215	47.91%
1972	3,560	81.82%	791	18.18%	0	0.00%
1976	2,974	39.06%	4,640	60.94%	0	0.00%
1980	5,300	52.65%	4,395	43.66%	372	3.70%
1984	10,121	75.46%	3,291	24.54%	0	0.00%
1988	12,413	73.77%	4,330	25.73%	83	0.49%
1992	11,945	52.64%	7,003	30.86%	3,742	16.49%
1996	13,006	57.31%	7,656	33.73%	2,034	8.96%
2000	15,440	62.64%	8,295	33.65%	914	3.71%
2004	18,856	60.42%	12,136	38.89%	214	0.69%
2008	16,921	44.78%	20,526	54.32%	337	0.89%
2012	15,716	41.19%	22,023	57.72%	417	1.09%
2016	13,478	35.39%	23,255	61.06%	1,354	3.56%
2020	13,014	29.11%	31,237	69.88%	448	1.00%
2024	11,711	25.93%	33,165	73.44%	284	0.63%

United States Senate election results for Rockdale County, Georgia2
Year	Republican		Democratic		Third party(ies)	
Year	No.	%	No.	%	No.	%
2020	12,716	28.73%	30,641	69.22%	906	2.05%
2020	11,244	27.62%	29,463	72.38%	0	0.00%

United States Senate election results for Rockdale County, Georgia3
Year	Republican		Democratic		Third party(ies)	
Year	No.	%	No.	%	No.	%
2020	7,323	16.56%	21,942	49.63%	14,947	33.81%
2020	13,012	29.40%	31,244	70.60%	0	0.00%
2022	8,722	25.08%	25,478	73.27%	574	1.65%
2022	7,752	24.51%	23,877	75.49%	0	0.00%

=== County Government ===
Rockdale County is governed by the Rockdale County Board of Commissioners, which serves as the county's legislative and governing body. The board consists of a Chair and two Commissioners, designated Post I and Post II, with all three positions elected at large. The chair also serves as the county's chief executive officer and oversees the day-to-day operations of county government.

The Board of Commissioners is responsible for adopting county ordinances and policies, approving the county budget, establishing county departments and services, and exercising other powers granted to counties under Georgia law.

Current County Commissioners as of January 2025:

District	Name	Political Party	Assumed Office
Chair	JaNice Van Ness	Democratic	2025
Post I	Tuwanya Smith	Democratic	2025
Post II	Doreen Williams	Democratic	2015

JaNice Van Ness, is the incumbent chair of the Board of Commissioners and the first woman to serve as Chair. She previously served as Post II Commissioner from 2007 to 2015 as a member of the Republican Party. Following her defeat to Dr. Doreen Williams in 2014, Van Ness was elected to the Georgia State Senate in a special election in 2015, serving until 2017.

Richard Oden, who served as Chairman from 2009 to 2017, was the first African American Chair of the board and the first Democrat elected to the seat in several years.

Rockdale has a long history of sitting Commissioners being defeated in primaries. In 2004, Roy Middlebrooks, a captain in the Rockdale County Sheriff's Office, defeated incumbent Chairman Norman Wheeler in the Republican primary. In 2024, former Commissioner JaNice Van Ness registered as a Democrat and defeated two-term incumbent Chairman Osborn "Oz" Nesbitt Sr. in the Democrat primary. Tuwanya Smith also defeated two-term incumbent Post I Commissioner Sherri Washington in the Democrat primary. In 2026, Melisa T. Mims defeated three-term incumbent Post II Commissioner Dr. Doreen Williams in the Democrat primary. None of the Democratic nominees mentioned faced a Republican opponent in the general election.

Georgia Gubernatorial election results for Rockdale County
Year	Republican		Democratic		Third party(ies)	
Year	No.	%	No.	%	No.	%
2022	9,938	28.47%	24,756	70.92%	214	0.61%

The first Commissioner was T. G Callaway, elected in 1920. In 1977, the Georgia General Assembly passed legislation creating the Board of Commissioners, replacing the sole Commissioner system. The office of the sole Commissioner became the office of the Chair of the newly established board. The first Board of Commissioners of Rockdale County consisted of Chairman Heyward L. Woodward, Post I Commissioner Ray Magnusson, and Post II Commissioner Herman L. Francis.

=== Rockdale County Sheriff ===
The Sheriff's Office provides police patrol to the county areas other than in Conyers which has a municipal police department. The Sheriff also protects the court, maintains the county prison, and provides administration services. The current Sheriff is Sheriff Eric J. Levett, who was first elected in 2008. Levett is the first African American to serve as sheriff of Rockdale County.

=== United States Congress ===
Seantors	Name	Party	Assumed office	Level
Senate Class 2	Jon Ossoff	Democratic	2021	Senior Senator
Senate Class 3	Raphael Warnock	Democratic	2021	Junior Senator
Representative	Name	Party	Assumed office	
District 13	Everton Blair	Democratic	2026	

=== Georgia General Assembly ===
==== Georgia State Senate ====
District	Name	Party	Assumed office
43	Tonya Anderson	Democratic	2017

==== Georgia House of Representatives ====
District	Name	Party	Assumed office
91	Angela Moore	Democratic	2021
92	Rhonda Taylor	Democratic	2021
93	Doreen Carter	Democratic	2015

== Recreation ==
- Georgia International Horse Park
- Black Shoals Lake and Covered Bridge
- Old Towne Conyers Historic District
- Monastery of the Holy Spirit
- Salem Campground
- Smyrna Campground
- Milstead Historic Mill Village
- Panola Mountain State Park
- Rockdale Baptist Church
- Georgia Revolution FC

== Transportation ==
=== Major highways ===
- I-20 / US 278 / SR 12 / SR 402
- SR 20
- SR 138
- SR 155
- SR 162
- SR 212

=== Pedestrians and cycling ===
- Arabia Mountain Path
- Conyers Trail
- Deer Run Trial
- Rockdale River Trail
- S River Trail

== Notable people ==
- Jill Arrington, ESPN college football reporter
- Billy Buckner, former Major League Baseball player
- Pop-punk band Cartel's Will Pugh, Joseph Pepper, Jeff Lett, Nic Hudson, & Kevin Sanders
- David Elder, former Major League Baseball player
- Dakota Fanning, actress
- Elle Fanning, actress
- Holly Hunter, actress
- John Mark Karr, JonBenét Ramsey's falsely claimed murderer
- Clint Mathis, World Cup soccer player
- Jack McBrayer, actor
- Kevin Ware, current college basketball player
- E.R. Shipp - Pulitzer Prize recipient
- Grady Jarrett - NFL player
- Teddy Swims - Singer

== See also ==
- National Register of Historic Places listings in Rockdale County, Georgia
- List of counties in Georgia

== Sources ==
- Margaret G. Barksdale, E. L. Cowan, Francis A. King, eds. A History of Rockdale County (Conyers, Ga., 1978).
- The Heritage of Rockdale County, Georgia (Waynesville, N.C., 1998).
