= DeKalb County, Georgia =

County in Georgia, United States

- County
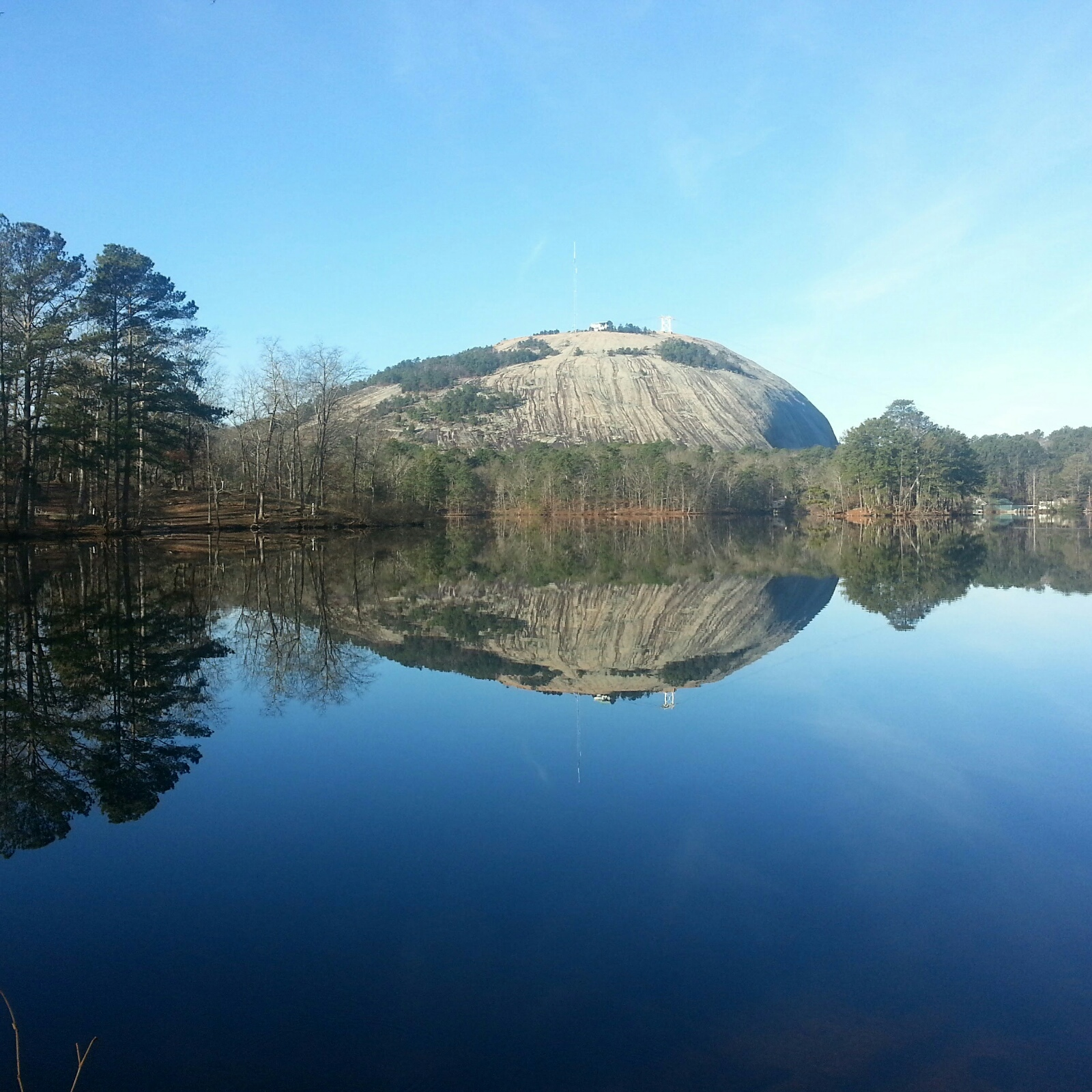
- Stone Mountain Park

- Flag Seal Logo

- Location within the U.S. state of Georgia
- Coordinates: 33°46′N 84°14′W
- Country: United States
- State: Georgia
- Founded: December 9, 1822; 203 years ago
- Named for: Johann de Kalb
- Seat: Decatur
- Largest city: Stonecrest
- Other cities: Atlanta (Mainly in Fulton County)

Government
  - Chief Executive Officer: Lorraine Cochran-Johnson (D)

Area
  - Total: 271 sq mi (700 km^{2})
  - Land: 268 sq mi (690 km^{2})
  - Water: 3.6 sq mi (9.3 km^{2}) 1.3%

Population (2020)
  - Total: 764,382
  - Estimate (2025): 774,394 ▲
  - Density: 2,850/sq mi (1,100/km^{2})
- Time zone: UTC−5 (Eastern)
  - Summer (DST): UTC−4 (EDT)
- Congressional districts: 4th, 5th
- Website: dekalbcountyga.gov

DeKalb County (/dəˈkæb/ də-KAB, /diːˈ-/ dee-) is located in the north central portion of the U.S. state of Georgia. As of the 2020 census, the population was 764,382, making it Georgia's fourth-most populous county. Its county seat is Decatur.

DeKalb County is a core county of the Atlanta metropolitan area. It contains roughly 10% of the city of Atlanta (the other 90% lies in Fulton County). Stonecrest is the largest city that is entirely within the county. DeKalb is primarily a suburban county.

In recent years, some communities in North DeKalb have incorporated, following a trend in other suburban areas around Metro Atlanta. Stonecrest, Dunwoody and Brookhaven are now the largest cities that are entirely contained within the county.

== History ==
The area of DeKalb county was acquired by the state of Georgia as a result of the 1821 Treaty of Indian Springs with a faction of the Muscogee (Creek). DeKalb County, formed in 1822 from Henry, Gwinnett and Fayette counties, took its name from Baron Johann de Kalb (1721–1780), a Bavarian-born former officer in the French Army, who fought for the Continental Army in the American Revolutionary War. The oldest existing house in the county is the 1831 Goodwin House along Peachtree Road in Brookhaven. Much of the area was forested; a section of old-growth forest is preserved at Fernbank Forest.

In 1853, Fulton County formed from the western half of DeKalb, divided along a perfectly straight and due north–south line down the middle (along which Moreland Avenue now runs). Until this time, the growing city of Atlanta had been inside DeKalb. Atlanta grew because the city of Decatur did not want to become the railroad terminus in the 1830s, thus a spot at the Thrasherville encampment in western DeKalb was picked to become Terminus and then Marthasville, before becoming Atlanta a few years after its founding. North and southwest Fulton came from two other counties: Milton and southeast Campbell, respectively. DeKalb once extended slightly further north to the Chattahoochee River, but this strip was later given to Milton, and is now the panhandle of Sandy Springs.

During the American Civil War, much of the Battle of Atlanta took place in DeKalb.

Until the 1960s, DeKalb was a mainly agricultural county, but as the sprawl of the metropolitan Atlanta region expanded, DeKalb became increasingly urbanized. Finished in 1969, the eastern half of the Interstate 285 beltway, called "the Perimeter", ringed the northeastern and southern edges of the county, placing most of it "inside the Perimeter" along with nearly all of Atlanta. Interstate 675 and Georgia 400 were originally planned to connect inside the Perimeter, along with the Stone Mountain Freeway (U.S. Highway 78) connecting with the Downtown Connector (a co-signment of I-75/I-85) near Moreland Avenue, destroying many neighborhoods in western DeKalb, but community opposition in the early 1970s spared them this fate of urbanization, although part of the proposed Stone Mountain Tollway later became the Freedom Parkway. Only Interstate 20 and Interstate 85 were successfully built through the county. DeKalb also became one of only two counties to approve MARTA rapid transit in the 1970s; the county now contains the east and northeast heavy rail lines.

In April 2018, more than 350 bus drivers for DeKalb County School District went on strike over low pay and poor working conditions, resulting in seven bus drivers being fired.

== Geography ==
According to the U.S. Census Bureau, the county has a total area of 271 square miles (700 km^{2}), of which 268 square miles (690 km^{2}) is land and 3.6 square miles (9.3 km^{2}) (1.3%) is water. The county is located within the upper Piedmont region of the state. The shape of DeKalb county in a way resembles a miniature Georgia itself, with similar river borders and straight lines.

The county is crossed by the South River and numerous creeks, including Nancy Creek, Snapfinger Creek and two forks of Peachtree Creek. Peachtree Creek and Nancy Creek drain into the Chattahoochee River and eventually to the Gulf of Mexico. South River drains into the Ocmulgee River and ultimately into the Atlantic Ocean.

In 2021, the non-profit American Rivers named DeKalb's South River the fourth-most endangered river in the United States, citing "the egregious threat that ongoing sewage pollution poses to clean water and public health."

The southern two-thirds of DeKalb County, in a line from Druid Hills northeast to Tucker, is located in the Upper Ocmulgee River sub-basin of the Altamaha River basin, while the portion of the county north of that line is located in the Upper Chattahoochee River sub-basin of the ACF River Basin (Apalachicola-Chattahoochee-Flint River Basin).

Stone Mountain lies near the eastern border of the county. Soapstone Ridge, parallel to the southern border, was heavily quarried between 1400 and 100 BC and objects made from the soapstone have been found as far away as the Great Lakes.

=== Adjacent counties ===
- Gwinnett County – North/Northeast
- Rockdale County – east
- Henry County – south
- Clayton County – southwest
- Fulton County – west

== Communities ==
=== Cities ===
- Atlanta (mostly in Fulton County)
- Avondale Estates
- Brookhaven
- Chamblee
- Clarkston
- Decatur
- Doraville
- Dunwoody
- Lithonia
- Pine Lake
- Stonecrest
- Stone Mountain
- Tucker

=== Census-designated places ===
- Belvedere Park
- Candler-McAfee
- Druid Hills
- Gresham Park
- North Decatur
- North Druid Hills (also known as Briarcliff or Toco Hills)
- Panthersville
- Redan
- Scottdale

=== Unincorporated communities ===
- Buford Highway
- Collinsville
- Conley (partly)
- Ellenwood
- Embry Hills
- Lenox Park (neighborhood in Brookhaven)
- Northlake
- Pittsburg
- Smoke Rise
- Snapfinger
- North Druid Hills
- Scottdale
- Druid Hills
- Panthersville
- Redan
- Gresham Park
- North Decatur
- Swift Creek
- North Brookhaven

=== Ghost town ===
- Constitution

== Demographics ==
Historical population
Census	Pop.	Note	%±
1830	10,042		—
1840	10,467		4.2%
1850	14,328		36.9%
1860	7,806		−45.5%
1870	10,014		28.3%
1880	14,497		44.8%
1890	17,189		18.6%
1900	21,112		22.8%
1910	27,881		32.1%
1920	44,051		58.0%
1930	70,278		59.5%
1940	86,942		23.7%
1950	136,395		56.9%
1960	256,782		88.3%
1970	415,387		61.8%
1980	483,024		16.3%
1990	545,837		13.0%
2000	665,865		22.0%
2010	691,893		3.9%
2020	764,382		10.5%
2025 (est.)	774,394	▲	1.3%
U.S. Decennial Census; 1790-1880 1890-1910; 1920-1930 1930-1940; 1940-1950 1960-1980; 1980-2000 2010 2020

=== Racial and ethnic composition ===
DeKalb County, Georgia – Racial and ethnic composition Note: the US Census treats Hispanic/Latino as an ethnic category. This table excludes Latinos from the racial categories and assigns them to a separate category. Hispanics/Latinos may be of any race.
Race / Ethnicity (NH = Non-Hispanic)	Pop 1980	Pop 1990	Pop 2000	Pop 2010	Pop 2020	% 1980	% 1990	% 2000	% 2010	% 2020
White alone (NH)	338,929	284,025	214,685	203,395	215,895	70.17%	52.03%	32.24%	29.40%	28.24%
Black or African American alone (NH)	129,933	228,922	358,381	370,963	384,438	26.90%	41.94%	53.82%	53.62%	50.29%
Native American or Alaska Native alone (NH)	605	893	964	1,239	1,161	0.13%	0.16%	0.14%	0.18%	0.15%
Asian alone (NH)	4,633	15,952	26,483	35,173	50,076	0.96%	2.92%	3.98%	5.08%	6.55%
Native Hawaiian or Pacific Islander alone (NH)	x	x	256	245	202	x	x	0.04%	0.04%	0.03%
Other race alone (NH)	1,454	426	1,674	1,644	4,719	0.30%	0.08%	0.25%	0.24%	0.62%
Mixed race or Multiracial (NH)	x	x	10,880	11,410	26,420	x	x	1.63%	1.65%	3.46%
Hispanic or Latino (any race)	7,470	15,619	52,542	67,824	81,471	1.55%	2.86%	7.89%	9.80%	10.66%
Total	483,024	545,837	665,865	691,893	764,382	100.00%	100.00%	100.00%	100.00%	100.00%

=== 2020 census ===
As of the 2020 census, the county had a population of 764,382 residents, with 302,243 households and 157,737 families.

The median age was 35.8 years. 22.1% of residents were under the age of 18 and 12.8% of residents were 65 years of age or older. For every 100 females there were 89.7 males, and for every 100 females age 18 and over there were 85.9 males age 18 and over. 99.8% of residents lived in urban areas, while 0.2% lived in rural areas.

The racial makeup of the county was 29.5% White, 50.9% Black or African American, 0.6% American Indian and Alaska Native, 6.6% Asian, 0.0% Native Hawaiian and Pacific Islander, 5.9% from some other race, and 6.5% from two or more races. Hispanic or Latino residents of any race comprised 10.7% of the population.

Of the 302,243 households in the county, 29.9% had children under the age of 18 living with them and 36.6% had a female householder with no spouse or partner present. About 31.2% of all households were made up of individuals and 8.7% had someone living alone who was 65 years of age or older.

There were 326,101 housing units, of which 7.3% were vacant. Among occupied housing units, 52.8% were owner-occupied and 47.2% were renter-occupied. The homeowner vacancy rate was 1.8% and the rental vacancy rate was 8.3%.

=== 2010 census ===
In 2010, the median income for a household in the county was $51,349 and the median income for a family was $60,718. Males had a median income of $43,663 versus $40,288 for females. The per capita income for the county was $28,412. About 12.4% of families and 16.1% of the population were below the poverty line, including 24.2% of those under age 18 and 11.2% of those age 65 or over.

=== 2000 census ===
The county recorded a population of 665,865 in the 2000 census.

== Economy ==
Major employers in DeKalb County include:

- AT&T Mobility, headquartered in the Lenox Park neighborhood of Brookhaven
- Emory Healthcare, located off of Clifton Road
- Emory University, located off of Clifton Road
- Kroger, which operates its Atlanta-area offices at 2175 Parklake Drive NE in Northlake
- DeKalb County School District, headquartered in Stone Mountain

== Culture ==
=== Visitor attractions ===
- Davidson-Arabia Mountain Nature Preserve
- Stone Mountain Park
- Fernbank Museum of Natural History
- Fernbank Science Center
- Michael C. Carlos Museum
- Callanwolde Fine Arts Center
- National Register of Historic Places listings in DeKalb County, Georgia
- DeKalb History Center

=== DeKalb County 9/11 Memorial ===
The DeKalb County 9/11 Memorial was dedicated on September 11, 2011.

U.S. Marine and sculptor Curtis James Miller designed a memorial that is located in front of the Dekalb County Fire and Police Headquarters. The memorial pays homage to the 343 New York Firefighters, 60 New York Police Department and Port Authority Police Officers, and the more than 2800 civilian victims of the terrorist attacks in New York City, Washington D.C., and Shanksville, Pennsylvania on September 11, 2001.

A piece of steel from one of the World Trade Center Towers in New York City is the centerpiece of this monument.

== Education ==
=== Primary and secondary education ===
==== Public schools ====
The portion of DeKalb County not within the city of Atlanta or the city of Decatur is served by DeKalb County School District (formerly DeKalb County School System). The Atlanta portion is served by Atlanta Public Schools (APS). The Decatur portion is served by Decatur City School District.

In 2020 this was the case, except that the Emory University/Centers for Disease Control area at the time was still in DeKalb County schools. In 2018 the City of Atlanta had annexed the region, but initially it was still covered by DeKalb County schools. There were plans to move the area into APS, and this was scheduled for 2024.

==== Private schools ====
Private schools in DeKalb County include:

- Atlanta Jewish Academy Upper School (former Yeshiva Atlanta) in Doraville
- Benjamin Franklin Academy (unincorporated area)
- Howard Scholars Academy (Decatur)
- Marist School (Brookhaven)
- Mohammed Schools (unincorporated area)
- Paideia School (Atlanta)
- Saint Thomas More Catholic Elementary & Middle School (Decatur)
- St. Pius X Catholic High School (Chamblee)
- Friends School of Atlanta (Decatur)
- Waldorf School of Atlanta (Decatur)
- Academe of the Oaks (Decatur)

The Roman Catholic Archdiocese of Atlanta supervises Catholic schools.

From its opening in 1990 until 2003, the Seigakuin Atlanta International School was located on the property of Oglethorpe University in Brookhaven, then an unincorporated area called North Atlanta.

=== Higher education ===
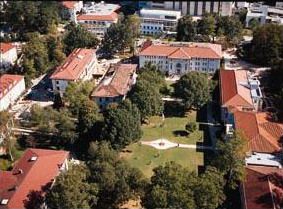
Emory University

Agnes Scott College is a private, all female, undergraduate liberal arts college in Decatur.

Emory University, also located in the Atlanta city limits, is a private, coeducational, liberal arts university. It is a member of the Association of American Universities, an association of leading research universities in the US and Canada. The university consists of the following divisions: Emory College of Arts and Science, the Laney Graduate School, Candler School of Theology, Goizueta Business School, Emory University School of Law, Rollins School of Public Health, and the Nell Hodgson Woodruff School of Nursing.

Mercer University is a private, coeducational, faith-based university with a Baptist heritage. Its main campus is in Macon. The Cecil B. Day Graduate and Professional Campus is in DeKalb County; it houses the College of Nursing, the College of Pharmacy and Health Sciences, and the James and Carolyn McAfee School of Theology along with programs of the Eugene W. Stetson School of Business and Economics, the School of Medicine, and the Tift College of Education.

Oglethorpe University is a private, coeducational, liberal arts school in Brookhaven and is named after James Oglethorpe, founder of the Georgia Colony.

Perimeter College at Georgia State University (formerly Georgia Perimeter College) has three campuses within DeKalb County and offers two-year associate degrees.

Georgia Military College (GMC) has a satellite campus in Stone Mountain Village.

Georgia Piedmont Technical College (formerly DeKalb Technical College) is the largest vocational institution in Georgia. Georgia Piedmont Technical College trains students in business, engineering, technologies, health, human services, industrial arts, information systems, and transportation.

DeVry University offers bachelor's and master's degrees in healthcare, accounting, business, and management technology.

Columbia Theological Seminary is a theological institution of the Presbyterian Church (USA) in Decatur. More than 640 students are enrolled at Columbia in one of five degree programs: Master of Divinity, Master of Arts in Theological Studies, Master of Theology, Doctor of Ministry, and Doctor of Theology.

Luther Rice College and Seminary is a private Christian college and seminary in Lithonia. It offers bachelors, masters, and doctoral programs in ministry and ministry-related programs.

=== Public libraries ===
The DeKalb County Public Library has 22 branches throughout the county.

== Crime ==
In 2022, DeKalb County had the second highest crime rate in Georgia. The county saw 40.3 crimes per 1,000 residents. The county also had the second highest rate of robberies and motor vehicle theft, as well as the third highest rates of burglary and larceny theft. Crime is highly concentrated in the southern half of the county. DeKalb was only behind Bibb County for highest crime rate.

== Government and politics ==
In recent years, along with many other counties in the Atlanta area, DeKalb County has voted strongly Democratic in presidential elections, while in the past it was more of a swing county, voting Democratic and Republican an equal number of times from 1960 until 1988. DeKalb is also one of the few counties in Georgia where George Wallace came in third in 1968. Following the 2020 Georgia state elections, there are no elected Republicans in the county.

DeKalb is the second most Democratic-leaning county in Georgia, only behind Clayton County. 83 percent of the votes cast in the 2020 presidential election were for Joe Biden.

United States presidential election results for DeKalb County, Georgia
Year	Republican		Democratic		Third party(ies)	
Year	No.	%	No.	%	No.	%
1880	330	27.36%	876	72.64%	0	0.00%
1884	450	30.51%	1,025	69.49%	0	0.00%
1888	313	23.24%	1,021	75.80%	13	0.97%
1892	496	20.68%	1,370	57.13%	532	22.19%
1896	439	32.45%	815	60.24%	99	7.32%
1900	216	20.67%	756	72.34%	73	6.99%
1904	213	16.08%	759	57.28%	353	26.64%
1908	356	26.16%	740	54.37%	265	19.47%
1912	48	2.03%	1,888	79.76%	431	18.21%
1916	12	0.63%	1,690	88.99%	197	10.37%
1920	803	30.30%	1,847	69.70%	0	0.00%
1924	590	18.20%	2,277	70.26%	374	11.54%
1928	2,378	50.91%	2,293	49.09%	0	0.00%
1932	633	10.48%	5,323	88.14%	83	1.37%
1936	1,137	13.28%	7,391	86.34%	32	0.37%
1940	2,081	18.94%	8,862	80.65%	45	0.41%
1944	2,555	17.47%	12,069	82.52%	1	0.01%
1948	5,758	29.50%	10,826	55.46%	2,937	15.05%
1952	15,588	42.76%	20,865	57.24%	0	0.00%
1956	15,718	34.44%	29,915	65.56%	0	0.00%
1960	24,046	49.93%	24,116	50.07%	0	0.00%
1964	49,448	57.09%	37,154	42.90%	11	0.01%
1968	52,485	50.35%	27,796	26.67%	23,956	22.98%
1972	104,750	77.35%	30,671	22.65%	0	0.00%
1976	67,160	43.60%	86,872	56.40%	0	0.00%
1980	74,904	44.74%	82,743	49.43%	9,758	5.83%
1984	104,697	57.52%	77,329	42.48%	0	0.00%
1988	90,179	48.94%	92,521	50.21%	1,550	0.84%
1992	70,282	32.62%	124,559	57.82%	20,594	9.56%
1996	60,255	29.08%	137,903	66.55%	9,071	4.38%
2000	58,807	26.73%	154,509	70.24%	6,664	3.03%
2004	73,570	26.61%	200,787	72.61%	2,152	0.78%
2008	65,581	20.31%	254,594	78.86%	2,671	0.83%
2012	64,392	20.98%	238,224	77.63%	4,242	1.38%
2016	51,468	16.19%	251,370	79.08%	15,011	4.72%
2020	58,377	15.74%	308,162	83.09%	4,338	1.17%
2024	62,622	17.11%	299,630	81.86%	3,756	1.03%

United States Senate election results for DeKalb County, Georgia2
Year	Republican		Democratic		Third party(ies)	
Year	No.	%	No.	%	No.	%
2020	61,859	16.83%	298,479	81.19%	7,305	1.99%
2020	57,674	16.51%	291,667	83.49%	0	0.00%

United States Senate election results for DeKalb County, Georgia3
Year	Republican		Democratic		Third party(ies)	
Year	No.	%	No.	%	No.	%
2020	34,426	9.38%	226,498	61.69%	106,209	28.93%
2020	55,479	15.88%	293,902	84.12%	0	0.00%
2022	41,951	14.10%	250,761	84.27%	4,858	1.63%
2022	36,186	13.25%	236,930	86.75%	0	0.00%

=== County government ===
Georgia Gubernatorial election results for DeKalb County
Year	Republican		Democratic		Third party(ies)	
Year	No.	%	No.	%	No.	%
2022	54,522	18.28%	241,901	81.11%	1,806	0.61%

The current chief executive officer of DeKalb County is Lorraine Cochran-Johnson, a Democrat. She assumed office on January 1, 2025.

Current County Commissioners as of January 2025:

Name	District	Political party
Robert Patrick	1	Democratic
Michelle Long Spears	2	Democratic
Nicole Messiah	3	Democratic
Chakira Johnson	4	Democratic
Mereda Davis-Johnson	5	Democratic
Edward Terry	6	Democratic
Ladena Bolton	7	Democratic

The DeKalb County seal was created in 1967, by artist Jackson Bailey. The design is based on a passage from Aristotle in which a comparison is made between human progress and the relay race. The background landscape shows planted fields, which is a tribute to DeKalb's heritage as an agrarian community. The date of the county's founding, 1822, is at the bottom of the seal.

=== Public safety ===
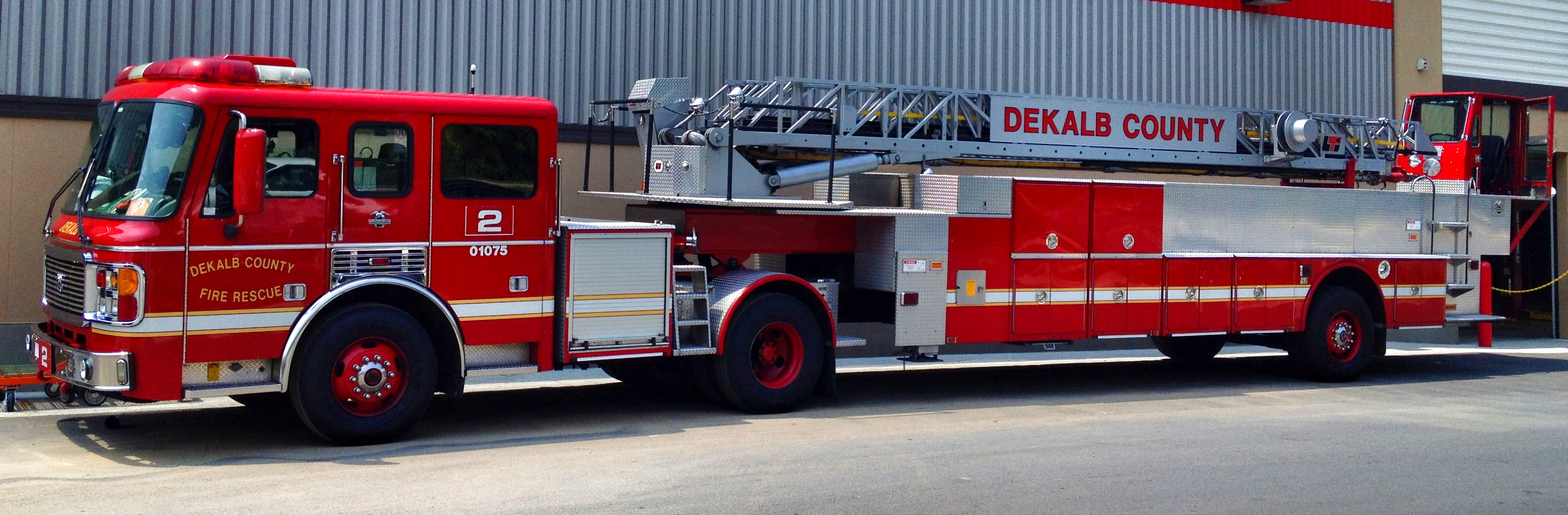
DeKalb County fire truck in Brookhaven

Unincorporated DeKalb County is policed by the DeKalb County Police Department; the DeKalb Sheriff's Office, which is responsible for serving criminal warrants and securing the courts and county jail; and the DeKalb Marshal's Office, which serves civil processes issued through state court, such as evictions.

Fire services are provided throughout the county by DeKalb County Fire and Rescue. Previously, DeKalb County Fire and Rescue exclusively provided emergency medical services (ambulance transport) throughout the county; however, since 2013, American Medical Response primarily provides emergency medical services to the county in addition to county staffed ambulances referred to as rescues.

=== Federal representation ===
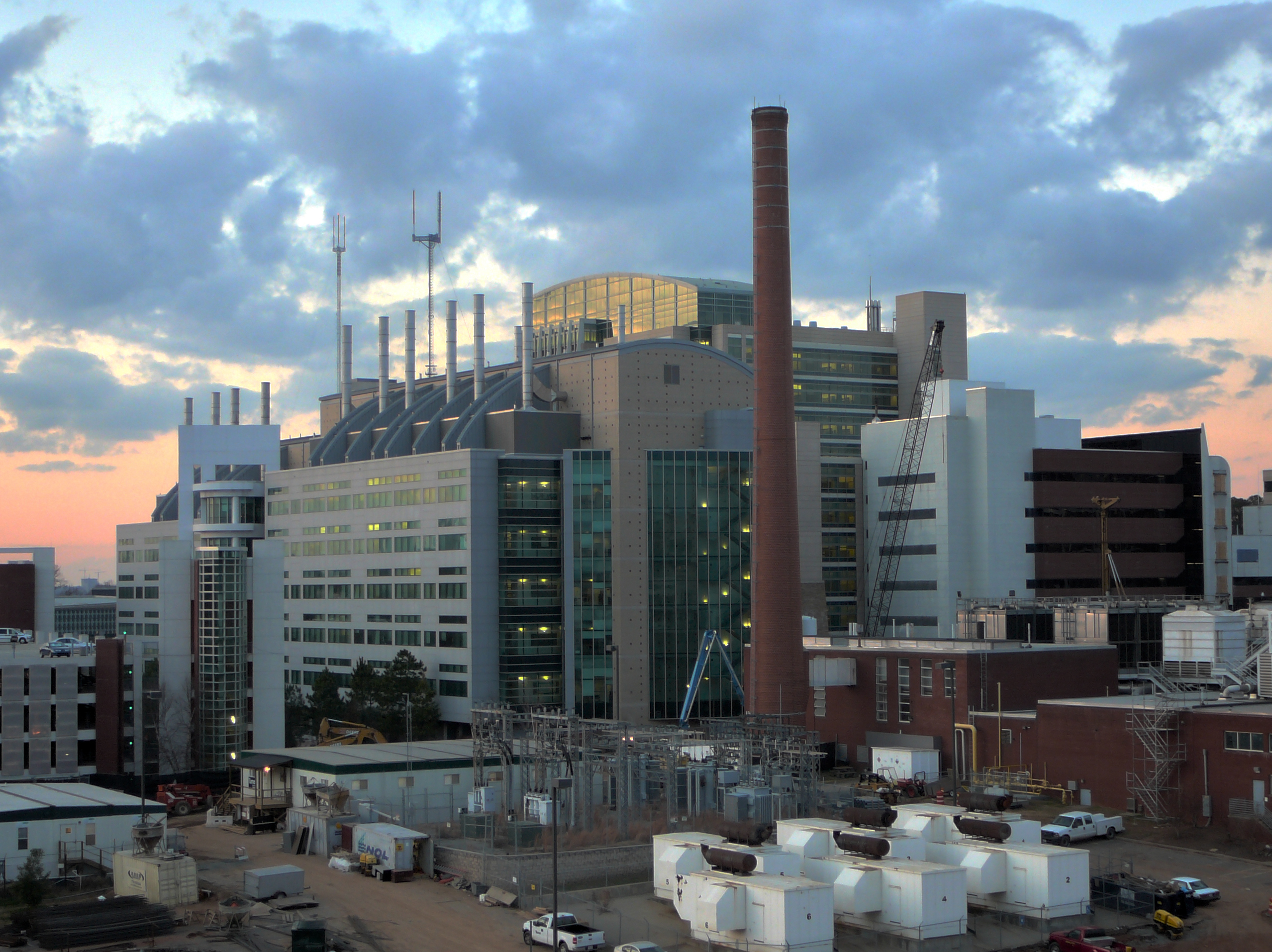
Centers for Disease Control and Prevention headquarters in the Druid Hills CDP as seen from Emory University

The Centers for Disease Control and Prevention is based in the Druid Hills CDP in an unincorporated area in the county. The Federal Bureau of Investigation Atlanta Field Office is located in Chamblee.

=== State representation ===
The Georgia Department of Juvenile Justice has its headquarters in Avondale Estates, near Decatur. The Georgia Bureau of Investigation has its headquarters near Decatur, in an unincorporated area.

The Metro State Prison of the Georgia Department of Corrections was formerly located in an unincorporated area in DeKalb County. Female death row inmates (UDS, "under death sentence") resided in the Metro State Prison. The prison was closed in 2011.

=== United States Congress ===
Senators	Name	Party	Assumed office	Level
Senate Class 2	Jon Ossoff	Democratic	2021	Senior Senator
Senate Class 3	Raphael Warnock	Democratic	2021	Junior Senator
Representatives	Name	Party	Assumed office	
District 4	Hank Johnson	Democratic	2007	
District 5	Nikema Williams	Democratic	2021	

=== Georgia General Assembly ===
==== Georgia State Senate ====
District	Name	Party	Assumed office
10	Emanuel Jones	Democratic	2005
40	Sally Harrell	Democratic	2019
41	Kim Jackson	Democratic	2021
42	Elena Parent	Democratic	2015
43	Tonya Anderson	Democratic	2017
44	Gail Davenport	Democratic	2011
55	Gloria Butler	Democratic	1999

==== Georgia House of Representatives ====
District	Name	Party	Assumed office
79	Mike Wilensky	Democratic	2019
80	Matthew Wilson	Democratic	2019
81	Scott Holcomb	Democratic	2011
82	Mary Margaret Oliver	Democratic	2002
83	Becky Evans	Democratic	2019
84	Renitta Shannon	Democratic	2017
85	Karla Drenner	Democratic	2001
86	Zulma Lopez	Democratic	1991
87	Viola Davis	Democratic	2019
88	Billy Mitchell	Democratic	2003
89	Bee Nguyen	Democratic	2017
90	Pam Stephenson	Democratic	2003
91	Rhonda Taylor	Democratic	2021
92	Doreen Carter	Democratic	2015
93	Dar'shun Kendrick	Democratic	2011
94	Karen Bennett	Democratic	2013

=== Diplomatic missions ===
The Consulate-General of Mexico in Atlanta is located in the North Druid Hills CDP. The Consulate-General of Guatemala in Atlanta is located in Chamblee. The Consulate-General of Peru in Atlanta is located in the city of Brookhaven."

== Transportation ==
=== Major roads and expressways ===
- I-20 / SR 402 (unsigned)
- I-85 / SR 403 (unsigned)
- I-285 / SR 407 (unsigned)
- I-675 / SR 413 (unsigned)
- US 23
- US 29 / SR 8
  - SR 8 Conn.
- US 78
- US 278
- SR 10
- SR 12
- SR 13
  - SR 13 Conn.
- SR 42
- SR 54 Conn.
- SR 124
- SR 141
- SR 154
  - SR 154 Spur
- SR 155
- SR 212
- SR 236
- SR 260
- SR 410

=== Mass transit ===
Xpress GA / RTA commuter buses and MARTA heavy rail subway and buses serve the county.

=== Pedestrians and cycling ===
Currently, there are plans for the construction of a multi-use trail, known as the Peachtree Creek Greenway. The goal of the greenway is to provide residents with close-to-home and close-to-work access to bicycle and pedestrian trails, serve transportation and recreation needs, and help encourage quality of life and sustainable economic growth. The trail will connect the cities of Atlanta, Brookhaven, Chamblee and Doraville.

- Arabia Mountain Path
- Chamblee Rail Trail
- Hill Loop Trail
- Nancy Creek Trail
- Peachtree Creek Greenway (under construction)
- South Peachtree Creek Trail
- Stone Mountain Trail (under construction)

== See also ==
- National Register of Historic Places listings in DeKalb County, Georgia
- Dekalb County District Attorney's Office
- List of counties in Georgia

== Bibliography ==
- DeKalb Historical Society. Vanishing DeKalb: A Pictorial History. Decatur, Ga.: DeKalb Historical Society, 1985. ISBN 0-9615459-0-9
- Mason, Herman. "Skip" Jr. African-American Life in DeKalb County, 1821–1970. Charleston, S.C.: Arcadia Publishing, 1998. ISBN 0-7385-0034-8
- Owens, Sue Ellen, and Megan Milford. DeKalb County in Vintage Postcards. Charleston, S.C.: Arcadia Publishing, 2001. ISBN 0-7385-1401-2
- Price, Vivian. The History of DeKalb County, Georgia, 1822–1900. Fernandina Beach, Fla.: Wolfe Publishing Company, 1997. ISBN 1-883793-27-0
