= Northlake Mall =

Northlake Mall may refer to the following shopping malls in the United States:

- Northlake Mall (Atlanta)
- Northlake Mall (Charlotte, North Carolina)
