= Ronald Ramsey Sr. =

American politician (1959–2025)

Member of the Georgia Senate from the 43rd district
- In office January 8, 2007 – July 30, 2015
- Succeeded by: JaNice Van Ness

Personal details
- Born: August 14, 1959 United States
- Died: September 25, 2025 (aged 66)
- Party: Democratic

Ronald B. Ramsey Sr. (August 14, 1959 – September 25, 2025) was an American judge and politician. He was a member of the Georgia State Senate representing the 43rd District, serving from 2007 to July 2015. Ramsey resigned his Senate seat following his appointment by Georgia Governor Nathan Deal to become a judge serving the Traffic Division of DeKalb State Court in DeKalb County. He graduated from Atlanta's John Marshall Law School and was a member of the Democratic Party. Ramsey died on September 25, 2025, at the age of 66.
