= JaNice Van Ness =

American politician

Member of the Georgia Senate from the 43rd district
- In office December 18, 2015 – January 9, 2017
- Preceded by: Ronald Ramsey Sr.
- Succeeded by: Tonya Anderson

Personal details
- Born: JaNice Frey Conyers, Georgia, US
- Party: Democratic (2024-present); Republican (before 2024)
- Education: Auburn University (B.A.); Emory College (A.A.S.)
- Profession: Politician, businessperson

JaNice Van Ness (also spelled JaNice VanNess) is an American politician currently serving as Chair of the Rockdale County Board of Commissioners. She previously served as Post II Commissioner of Rockdale County from 2007 to 2015, and served as a member of the Georgia State Senate from 2015 to 2017, representing the 43rd district, which includes parts of Rockdale County, Newton County, and DeKalb County.

Van Ness is the founder of Peachtree Prep Early Learning Centers and Peachtree Academy PreK-12 Christian Schools, with 4 campuses across Rockdale and Newton Counties. In 2006, Van Ness was elected Post II Commissioner of Rockdale County as a member of the Republican Party, and was reelected in 2010. In 2014, she was defeated in a bid for a third term by Democrat Dr. Doreen Williams.

In 2015, Van Ness ran for Georgia State Senate District 43 following the resignation of Ronald Ramsey. She narrowly defeated her opponent, Democrat Tonya Anderson, in a run-off election that took place on December 1, 2015. In the November 2016 general election, Van Ness had a rematch with Anderson, which resulted in Van Ness' defeat.

In 2024, Van Ness switched political parties, registering as a Democrat to run for Chair of the Rockdale County Board of Commissioners. She advanced to a June runoff election in which she defeated the two-term incumbent, Osborn "Oz" Nesbitt Sr.

On January 8, 2025, Van Ness was sworn-in as the Chair of the Board of Commissioners, becoming the first woman to serve as Chair.
