= Saira Draper =

American politician (born 1984)

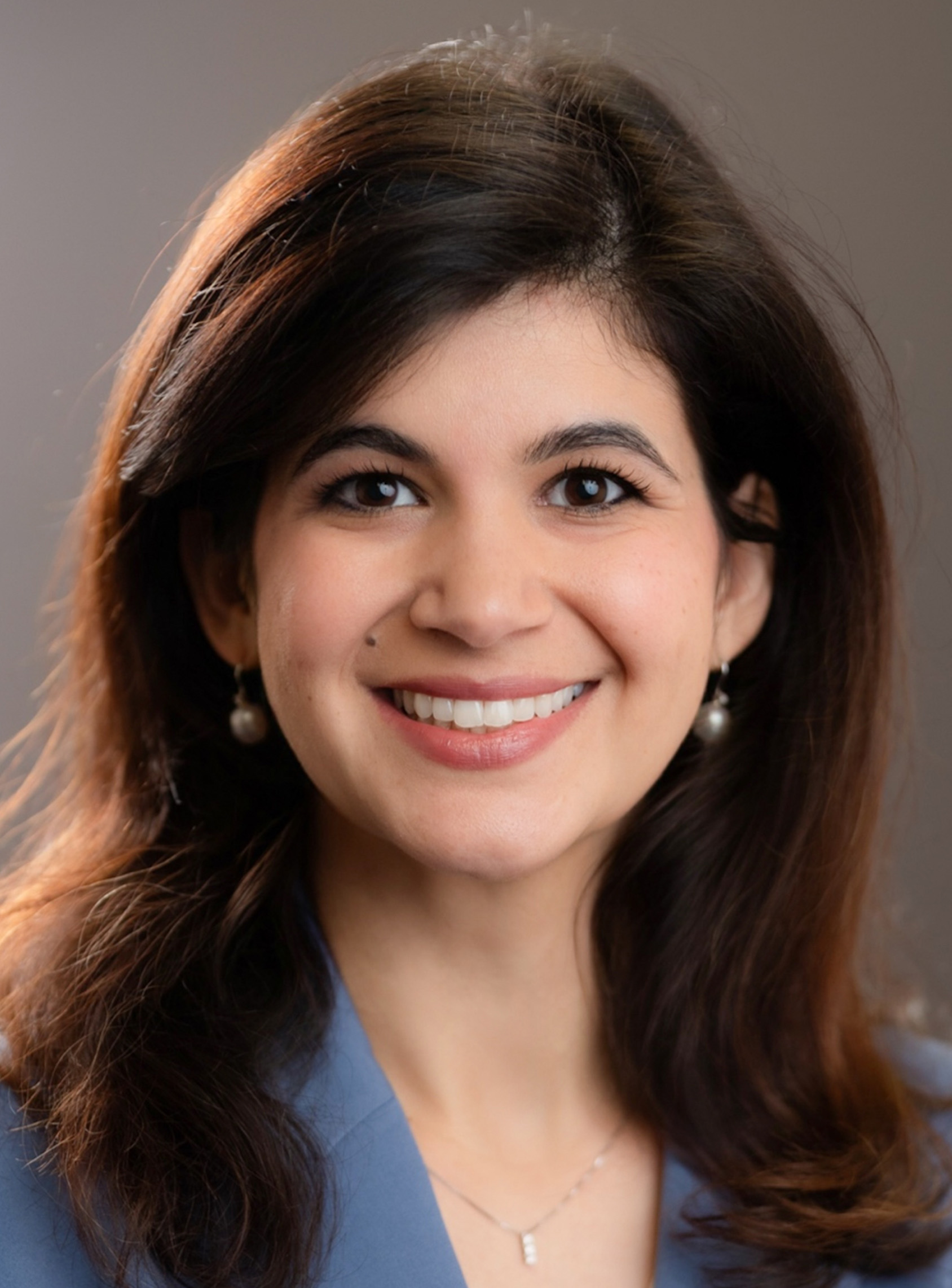
- Official portrait, 2023

Member of the Georgia House of Representatives from the 90th district
- Incumbent
- Assumed office January 9, 2023
- Preceded by: Angela Moore (redistricted)

Personal details
- Born: January 11, 1984 (age 42) United Kingdom
- Party: Democratic
- Children: 3
- Education: Georgia Institute of Technology (BA); Georgetown University (JD)
- Website: State house website Campaign website

Saira Amir Draper (born January 11, 1984) is an American lawyer and politician from the Georgia Democratic Party who serves as Minority Caucus Chief Deputy Whip of the Georgia House of Representatives, representing District 90.

== Early life and education ==
Draper was born in the United Kingdom to parents of Pakistani and Spanish origin. She moved to the United States with her parents as a child.

Draper attended North Springs High School in Sandy Springs, Georgia. She is a 2006 graduate of Georgia Tech's School of Public Policy.

== Career ==
From 2019 to 2022, Draper worked as Voter Protection Director for the Democratic Party of Georgia. In 2022, Draper stepped down from the position to run successfully in the 2022 Georgia House of Representatives election for District 90. Following the withdrawal of Joe Biden from the 2024 United States presidential election, Draper endorsed the Kamala Harris 2024 presidential campaign.

In the 2024 Georgia House election, she won re-election to District 90 against fellow Democratic incumbent Becky Evans. In the 2026 Georgia Senate election she will be the Democratic Party nominee to for Senate District 44, in which the incumbent, Democrat Elena Parent din not seek re-election
