= Peachtree Creek Greenway =

Coordinates: 33°50′31.6″N 84°19′20.2″W

- Length: 12.3 miles (19.8 km)
- Location: Atlanta, Georgia, United States
- Established: 1999
- Trailheads: Doraville (north) to; Atlanta Beltline (south)
- Use: Cycling and pedestrians
- Season: Year round
- Surface: Concrete
- Website: www.peachtreecreek.org

The Peachtree Creek Greenway trail is a multi-use trail under construction along the North Fork Peachtree Creek in and near Atlanta, Georgia, United States, which will traverse the cities of Atlanta, Brookhaven, Chamblee, Doraville and parts of unincorporated Dekalb County. Once complete, it will connect 12 miles (19 km) from the Atlanta Beltline and PATH400 trails northward up to I-285. Some landmarks along the route will include Silverback stadium, Mercer University, CHOA & Emory and multiple schools and libraries.

== History ==
Groundbreaking was in early 2018. Most of the Greenway will be a 14 foot (4.3 m) wide, lighted concrete path suitable for bikes, wheelchairs, strollers and all modes of non-engine transportation. It will be considered an alternate (non-auto) transportation route. In December 2019, the first "Model Mile" was open to the public in Brookhaven. The path of the Greenway follows alongside the North Fork Peachtree Creek. Significant clean-up of the creek has included the removal of 30 truck loads of trash and over 200 tires in addition to many invasive species of foliage.

While the Greenway is expected to increase business revenue along the mostly immigrant Buford Highway corridor (BuHi district) there is concern about the effect of increased property value on affordable housing surrounding the greenway. Controversy has risen in regards to gentrification along the corridor. Anticipation for the Peachtree Creek Greenway has already caused the median gross rent to rise by 22.9%. The City of Brookhaven has been awarded $2.7 million in federal funds towards the project through the Atlanta Regional Commission. In 2017 The City of Brookhaven attempted to take 19 acres of land for the Peachtree Creek Greenway through eminent domain. In March 2018 a Dekalb County Superior Court Judge ruled against Brookhaven, calling it an illegal "bad faith" deal.

The first section of the greenway opened on December 12, 2019 officially. In 2024, Brookhaven approved a $1.2 million contract to design the final phase of the Greenway.

== Points of interest ==
Section 1 (completed, 2018–2019, Opened December 2019)

- Mile 3.0, Elevation 826 ft., Southern terminus of section, North Druid Hills Rd., parking, Salvation Army
- Mile 3.22, Corporate Blvd., parking
- Mile 3.44, Corporate Square, southern end of bridge over Peachtree Creek
- Mile 3.56, gate to Jackson Square Condominiums, northern end of bridge over Peachtree Creek
- Mile 3.68, gate to Villas at Druid Hills
- Mile 3.96, maintenance facility
- Mile 4.27, Elevation 844 ft., Northern terminus of section, Briarwood Rd., parking

Section 2 (proposed)

- Northeast Plaza
- Fisher Trail Park

Section 3 (proposed)

- Avenues 85 Apartments
- Echo Ridge Swim & Tennis Club
- Globe Academy
- 5 East Apartments
- Seven Springs Apartments
- Clairmont Terrace
- McDaniel School Park
- The Brooke Apartments
- St. Pius X Catholic High School
- The Historical Mill
- Publix

Section 4 (proposed)

- Century Peachtree Creek Apartments
- Henderson Mill Creek
- Regal Cinemas Hollywood 24
- Mercer University (Atlanta Campus)

Section 5 (proposed)

- Embry Hills
- Stone Summit Climbing and Fitness Center
- Atlanta Silverbacks Park

== See also ==
- Cycling infrastructure
- 10-Minute Walk
- Smart growth
- Walkability
