= Soapstone Ridge =

Geological complex and archaeological site in Georgia, USA

- U.S. National Register of Historic Places
- Nearest city: Atlanta, Georgia
- NRHP reference No.: 73002138
- Added to NRHP: May 7, 1973

Soapstone Ridge is a mafic-ultramafic geological complex located in the Piedmont region, south-east of Atlanta, Georgia on a 25-square-mile (65 km^{2}) area in DeKalb County and neighboring Fulton and Clayton Counties.

The ridge was named from its deposits of metapyroxenite, which early settlers wrongly believed was soapstone. Many archaeological sites, including Late Archaic quarry sites dated between 600 BCE and 1500 BCE, occur on Soapstone Ridge. At least 17 quarry sites and 23 workshops sites have been located on Soapstone Ridge.
