= Georgia's 91st House of Representatives district =

State district in Georgia, USA

Georgia's 91st State House of Representatives district
Representative
Angela Moore; D–Stonecrest
- Demographics: 22.4% White; 71.2% Black; 2.6% Hispanic; 2.0% Asian
- Population: 60,989

District 91 elects one member of the Georgia House of Representatives. It contains parts of DeKalb County and Rockdale County.

== Members ==
- Dee Dawkins-Haigler (2013–2017)
- Vernon Jones (2017–2021)
- Rhonda Taylor (2021–2023)
- Angela Moore (since 2023)
