= Milstead, Georgia =

- Unincorporated community Census-designated place
- Location within Georgia Location within the United States
- Coordinates: 33°41′3″N 83°59′31″W
- Country: United States
- State: Georgia
- County: Rockdale

Area
  - Total: 0.46 sq mi (1.19 km^{2})
  - Land: 0.44 sq mi (1.13 km^{2})
  - Water: 0.023 sq mi (0.06 km^{2})
- Elevation: 800 ft (240 m)

Population (2020)
  - Total: 628
  - Density: 1,438.7/sq mi (555.49/km^{2})
- Time zone: UTC-5 (Eastern (EST))
  - Summer (DST): UTC-4 (EDT)
- ZIP Code: 30012 (Conyers)
- Area code: 470/678/770
- FIPS code: 13-51660
- GNIS feature ID: 2806020

Milstead is an unincorporated community and census-designated place (CDP) in Rockdale County, Georgia, United States. It is bordered to the south by the city of Conyers, the county seat, and to the north by the Yellow River.

The 2020 census listed a population of 628.

== Demographics ==
Historical population
Census	Pop.	Note	%±
2020	628		—
U.S. Decennial Census; 2020

Milstead was first listed as a census designated place in the 2020 U.S. census.

=== Racial and ethnic composition ===
Milstead CDP, Georgia – Racial and ethnic composition Note: the US Census treats Hispanic/Latino as an ethnic category. This table excludes Latinos from the racial categories and assigns them to a separate category. Hispanics/Latinos may be of any race.
Race / Ethnicity (NH = Non-Hispanic)	Pop 2020	% 2020
White alone (NH)	355	56.53%
Black or African American alone (NH)	152	24.20%
Native American or Alaska Native alone (NH)	1	0.16%
Asian alone (NH)	17	2.71%
Native Hawaiian or Pacific Islander alone (NH)	0	0.00%
Other race alone (NH)	3	0.48%
Mixed race or Multiracial (NH)	30	4.78%
Hispanic or Latino (any race)	70	11.15%
Total	628	100.00%
