= Northlake, Georgia =

- Unincorporated community
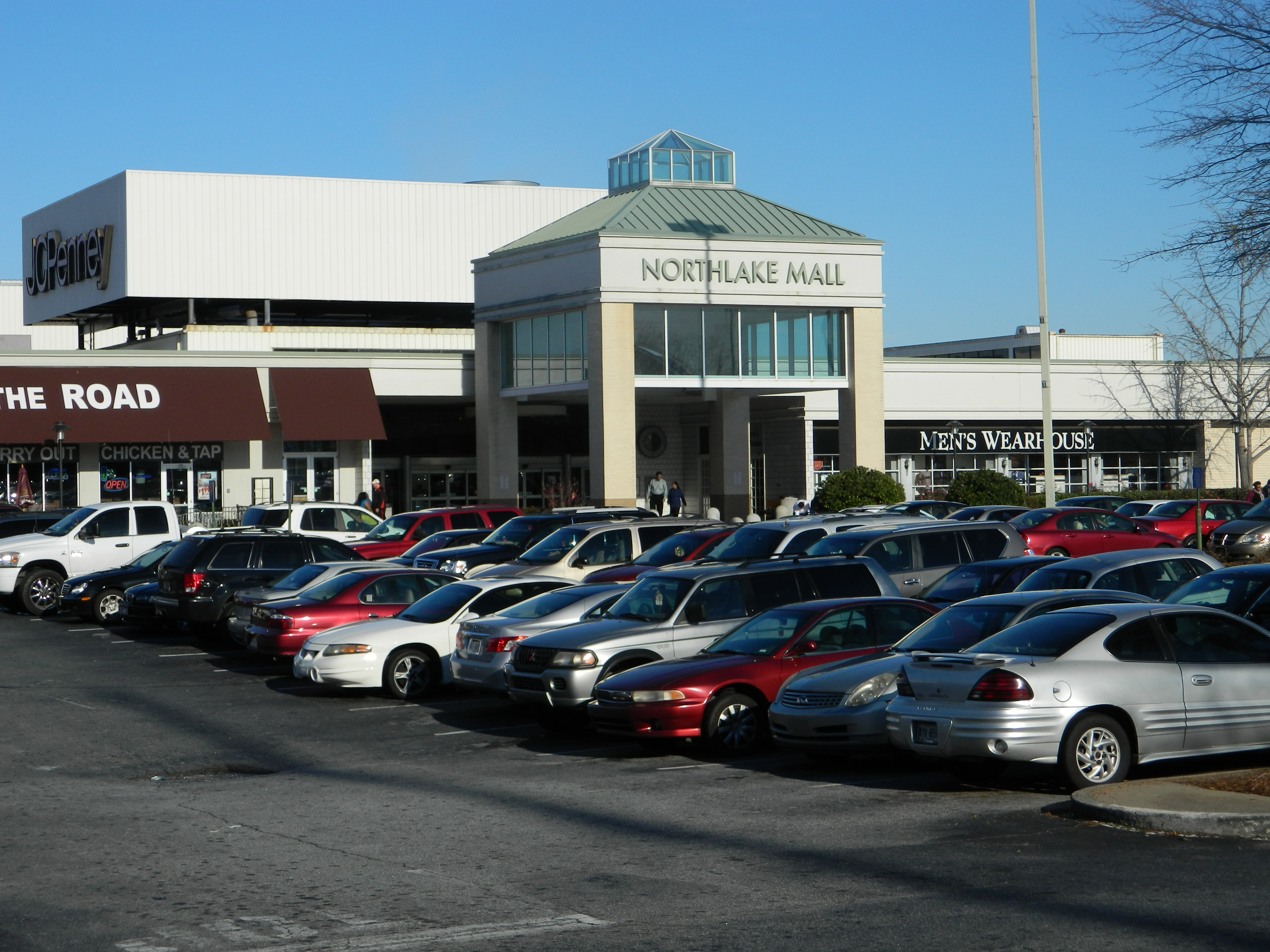
- Northlake Mall, the center of the community

- Location within Metro Atlanta Location within Georgia Location within the United States
- Coordinates: 33.8501033°N 84.2551997°W
- Time zone: UTC-5 (EST)
  - Summer (DST): UTC-4 (EDT)
- Website: Northlake Community Alliance

Northlake is an unincorporated community in northeastern Metro Atlanta, Georgia, United States, in DeKalb County. Although not formally an edge city, Northlake is home to a large amount of office space, retail options, and residential housing. Similar to its edge city neighbor north of Atlanta, Perimeter Center, Northlake's history began with the construction of a shopping mall, Northlake Mall, in 1971. Both the area and mall are named after North Lake, an actual lake within the community. Northlake is located northeast of Atlanta, south of the junction of I-285 and I-85. The area is served by the arterial roads of LaVista Road, Briarcliff Road, and Henderson Mill Road.

== Economy ==
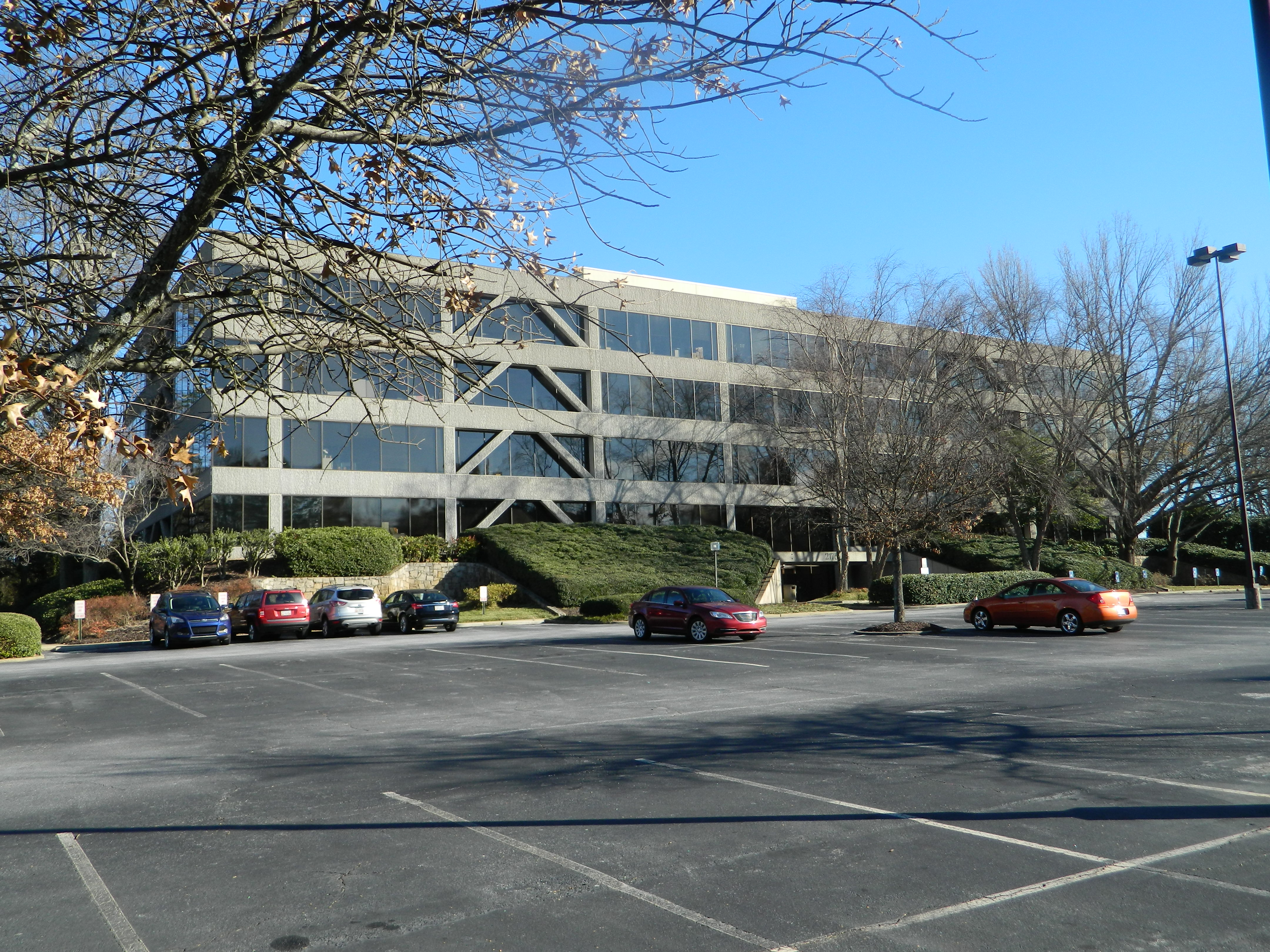
Kroger Atlanta Regional Headquarters

The Northlake business district is centered at the juncture of I-285 and Lavista Road and is composed primarily of low- and medium-density office parks. With about 11 million square feet of office space, Northlake is among the smallest submarkets in metro Atlanta. Major organizations occupying space in Northlake include Emory Orthopaedic and Spine Hospital and Kroger's Atlanta-area headquarters. Northlake usually has among the lowest vacancy rates in metro Atlanta. Northlake Mall opened in 1971 as the fifth mall to open in DeKalb County, and it was renovated in the 1990s.

== Education ==
The area is served by DeKalb County Public Schools. Three private colleges also make Northlake their home, including Mercer University's Atlanta campus. DeKalb County operates the Northlake Library.

== Government ==
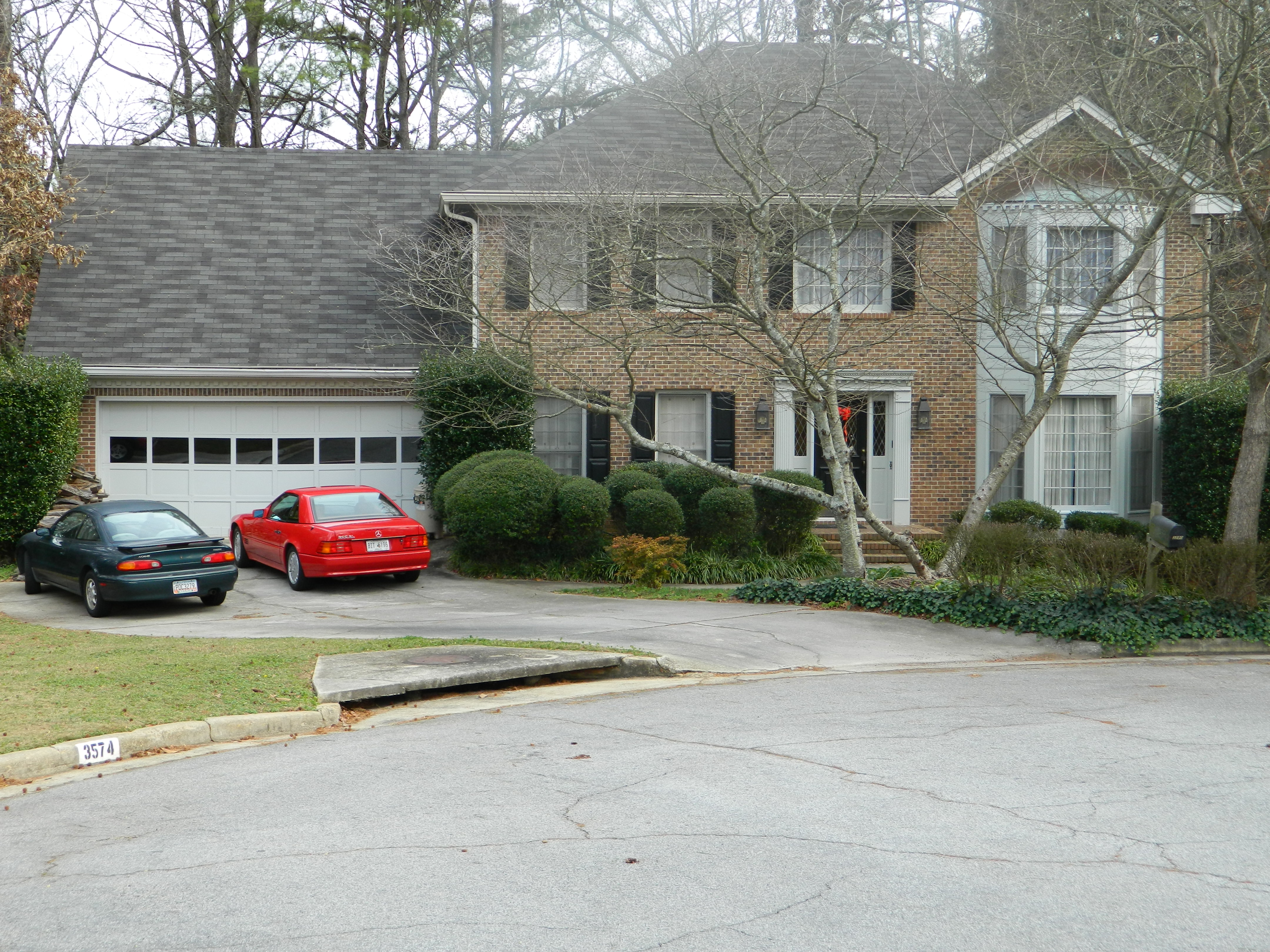
Suburban residence in Tucker

The Tucker Civic Association did a three-year study of potential cityhood for Tucker and found that due to the largely residential makeup of the community, a city of Tucker would have to include Northlake in its city borders to be financially viable. The association claimed that including Northlake would be difficult because of likely opposition from business owners.

The Northlake Community Alliance, a civic association, has considered establishing a community improvement district, similar to those established in other business districts of metro Atlanta, such as Cumberland and Perimeter Center. However, the plan was put on hold in 2010 due to the economy.
