= Georgia's 87th House of Representatives district =

State district in Georgia, USA

Georgia's 87th State House of Representatives district
Representative
Viola Davis; D–Stone Mountain
- Demographics: 17.3% White; 70.7% Black; 5.0% Hispanic; 4.4% Asian
- Population: 60,886

District 87 elects one member of the Georgia House of Representatives. It contains parts of DeKalb County.

== Members ==
- Earnest Williams (2002–2019)
- Viola Davis (since 2019)
