= Georgia's 93rd House of Representatives district =

State district in Georgia, USA

Georgia's 93rd State House of Representatives district
Representative
Doreen Carter; D–Lithonia
- Demographics: 21.7% White; 67.7% Black; 6.6% Hispanic; 1.5% Asian
- Population: 56,109

District 93 elects one member of the Georgia House of Representatives. It contains parts of DeKalb County, Gwinnett County and Rockdale County.

== Members ==
- Dar'shun Kendrick (2013–2023)
- Doreen Carter (since 2023)
