= DeKalb County District Attorney's Office =

The DeKalb County District Attorney is responsible for overseeing the prosecution of felony offenses filed in the Superior Court of DeKalb County, (Georgia) including: murder, drug and sex offenses, child and elder abuse, theft, and corruption. The current District Attorney is Sherry Boston. She was elected in November 2016, and assumed the office in January 2017.
