= Georgia's 43rd Senate district =

State district in Georgia, USA

Georgia's 43rd State Senate district
Senator
Tonya Anderson; D–Lithonia

District 43 of the Georgia Senate elects one member of the Georgia State Senate. It contains Rockdale County and parts of DeKalb, Gwinnett and Newton counties.

== State senators ==
- Ronald Ramsey Sr. (2007–2015)
- JaNice Van Ness (2015–2017)
- Tonya Anderson (since 2017)
