= Lakeview Estates, Georgia =

- Unincorporated community Census-designated place
- Location in Rockdale County and the state of Georgia
- Coordinates: 33°42′24″N 84°2′10″W
- Country: United States
- State: Georgia
- County: Rockdale

Area
  - Total: 0.54 sq mi (1.40 km^{2})
  - Land: 0.51 sq mi (1.32 km^{2})
  - Water: 0.031 sq mi (0.08 km^{2})
- Elevation: 790 ft (240 m)

Population (2020)
  - Total: 2,660
  - Density: 5,232.5/sq mi (2,020.27/km^{2})
- Time zone: UTC-5 (Eastern (EST))
  - Summer (DST): UTC-4 (EDT)
- ZIP code: 30012
- FIPS code: 13-44956
- GNIS feature ID: 0332172

Lakeview Estates, also known as Sunrise Lakes by local residents, is an unincorporated community and census-designated place (CDP) in Rockdale County, Georgia, United States. The population was 2,660 in 2020.

== Geography ==
Lakeview Estates is located at 33°42′24″N 84°02′10″W.

According to the United States Census Bureau, the CDP has a total area of 0.6 square miles (1.6 km^{2}), of which 0.5 square miles (1.3 km^{2}) is land and 0.04 square miles (0.10 km^{2}) (7.02%) is water.

== Demographics ==
Historical population
Census	Pop.	Note	%±
1980	1,576		—
1990	1,344		−14.7%
2000	2,637		96.2%
2010	2,695		2.2%
2020	2,660		−1.3%
U.S. Decennial Census; 1850-1870 1870-1880; 1890-1910 1920-1930; 1940 1950 1960; 1970 1980 1990; 2000 2010 2020

Lakeview Estates was first listed as a CDP in the 1980 U.S. census.

=== Racial and ethnic composition ===
Lakeview Estates CDP, Georgia – Racial and ethnic composition Note: the US Census treats Hispanic/Latino as an ethnic category. This table excludes Latinos from the racial categories and assigns them to a separate category. Hispanics/Latinos may be of any race.
Race / Ethnicity (NH = Non-Hispanic)	Pop 2000	Pop 2010	Pop 2020	% 2000	% 2010	% 2020
White alone (NH)	785	282	181	29.77%	10.46%	6.80%
Black or African American alone (NH)	133	60	32	5.04%	2.23%	1.20%
Native American or Alaska Native alone (NH)	12	6	0	0.46%	0.22%	0.00%
Asian alone (NH)	12	3	1	0.46%	0.11%	0.04%
Native Hawaiian or Pacific Islander alone (NH)	0	0	0	0.00%	0.00%	0.00%
Other race alone (NH)	1	13	9	0.04%	0.48%	0.34%
Mixed race or Multiracial (NH)	10	24	37	0.38%	0.89%	1.39%
Hispanic or Latino (any race)	1,684	2,307	2,400	63.86%	85.60%	90.23%
Total	2,637	2,695	2,660	100.00%	100.00%	100.00%

=== 2020 census ===
As of the 2020 census, Lakeview Estates had a population of 2,660.

The median age was 25.1 years. 37.7% of residents were under the age of 18 and 5.0% of residents were 65 years of age or older. For every 100 females there were 105.2 males, and for every 100 females age 18 and over there were 106.9 males age 18 and over.

100.0% of residents lived in urban areas, while 0.0% lived in rural areas.

There were 678 households in Lakeview Estates, of which 59.0% had children under the age of 18 living in them. Of all households, 58.3% were married-couple households, 17.7% were households with a male householder and no spouse or partner present, and 17.6% were households with a female householder and no spouse or partner present. About 12.9% of all households were made up of individuals and 3.4% had someone living alone who was 65 years of age or older.

There were 728 housing units, of which 6.9% were vacant. The homeowner vacancy rate was 0.0% and the rental vacancy rate was 2.7%.
