= Viola Davis (Georgia politician) =

American nurse and politician from Georgia

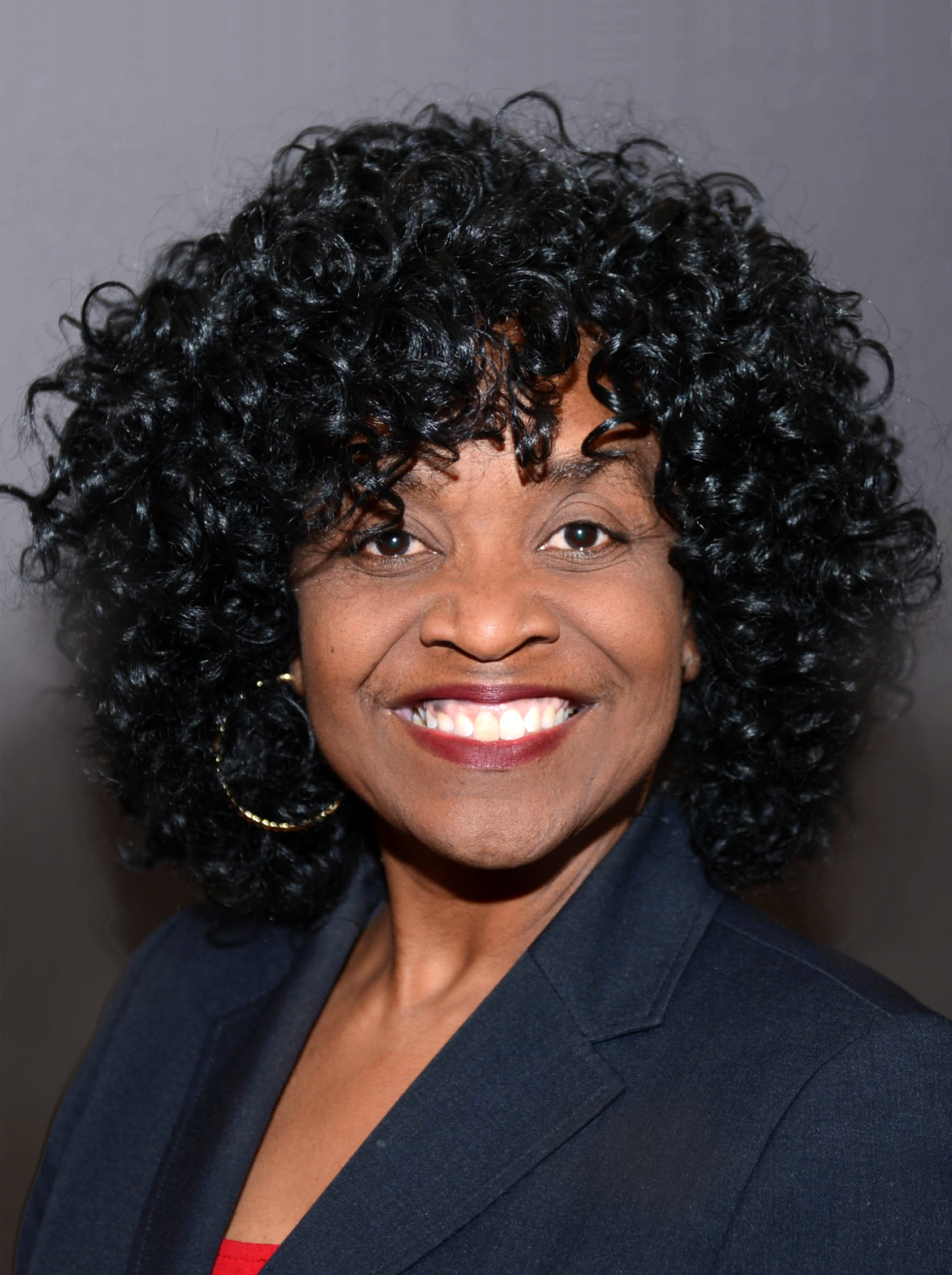

Member of the Georgia House of Representatives from the 87th district
- Incumbent
- Assumed office January 14, 2019
- Preceded by: Earnest Williams

Personal details
- Born: March 19, 1963 (age 63)
- Party: Democratic
- Education: Medical College of Georgia
- Occupation: Nurse; politician
- Website: Campaign website

Military service
- Branch: United States Army

Viola Davis (born March 19, 1963) is an American businesswoman, nurse, and politician who has served as a member of the Georgia House of Representatives from DeKalb County, Georgia. A member of the Democratic Party, she defeated Democratic Party incumbent Earnest "Coach" Williams in November 2018.

== Early life and education ==
Davis grew up in Topeka, Kansas, and in 1979 was part of the third phase of Brown vs. Board of Education after schools began to drift back to segregation following a change to open enrollment. She earned a Bachelor of Science degree in nursing from the Medical College of Georgia.

== Career ==
Prior to entering politics, Davis worked as a critical care nurse and community missionary. She also operated a hair salon and served in the United States Army. She received her real estate license in 1997. In the 2018 Georgia House of Representatives election she was elected in District 87.
