= Northlake Mall (Atlanta) =

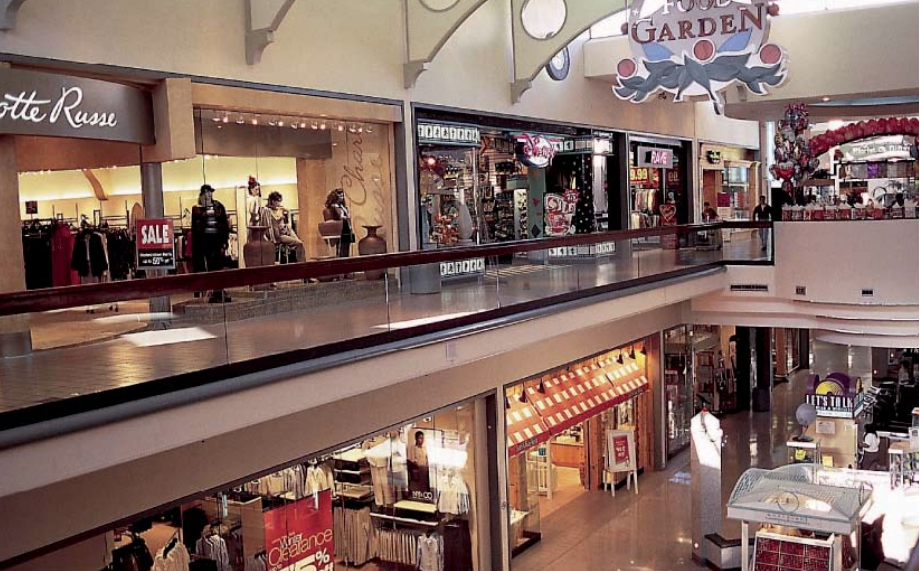
- Location: Northlake, Georgia, U.S. (near Tucker)
- Coordinates: 33°51′00″N 84°15′18″W
- Opened: October 6, 1971; 55 years ago
- Closed: June 29, 2026 (interior retail tenants ordered to vacate)
- Manager: ATR Corinth Partners
- Owner: ATR Corinth Partners
- Num. of stores: 100+
- Num. of anchor tenants: 4 (all vacant)
- Floor area: 962,000 sq ft (89,400 m^{2})
- Floors: 2
- Website: www.northlakemall.com

Northlake Mall was an enclosed shopping mall northeast of Atlanta in the Northlake community of northern DeKalb County, Georgia, United States. Since 2026, the mall owned by the 501(c)(3) Centurion Foundation.

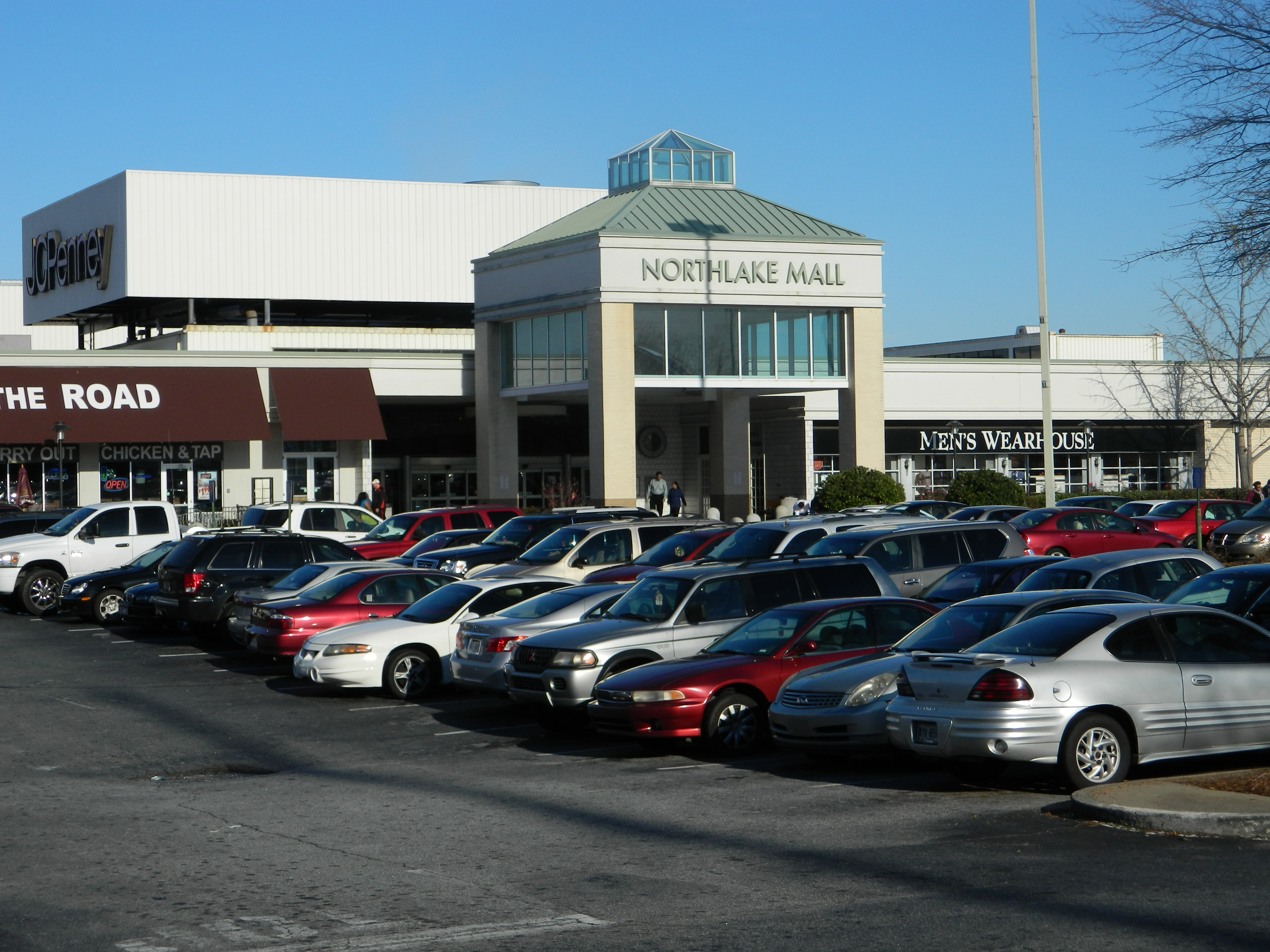
Exterior of Northlake Mall

== History ==
The mall was once owned and managed by Simon Property Group. In 2014, the ownership of the 43-year-old mall was spun off into a newly formed real estate investment trust, Washington Prime Group, and in 2015, Washington Prime Group completed the acquisition of Glimcher Realty Trust - forming WP Glimcher. In February 2016, the mall was sold to Texas-based ATR Corinth Partners. In July 2026, the 501(c)(3) Centurion Foundation bought the mall for $95 million, with intent to transform it into a health care campus.

=== Anchors ===
Before its closure, the sole anchor store remaining was Macy's (formerly Davison's). Former anchors include JCPenney, Kohl's, and Sears. Kohl's closed in 2016; its location was originally Atlanta's fourth Parisian in 1994, after both Town Center at Cobb and Phipps Plaza in 1992 and Gwinnett Place Mall in 1993. On May 31, 2018, Sears announced that it would be closing its location in September 2018 as part of a plan to close 72 stores nationwide. In October 2019, it was announced that Emory Healthcare will occupy the former Sears building. Emory Healthcare has since converted the building into a mass distribution site for COVID-19 vaccinations, serving as its largest off-site vaccination center. On June 4, 2020, it was announced that JCPenney would be closing on October 18, 2020, as part of a plan to close 154 stores nationwide, which left Macy's as the only anchor store left.

On January 8, 2026, Macy's announced that it would be closing as part of a plan to close 14 stores by the end of Q1 2026. This leaves the mall with no anchors, cementing its status as a dead mall. Macy's closed for the last time on April 26, 2026.

=== Revitalization planning ===
==== Tucker Northlake CID Master Plan Study (2015) ====
The Tucker-Northlake Community Improvement District (CID) completed its Master Plan for the Tucker and Northlake area in 2015, serving as the road map for transportation improvements and land use modifications.

Northlake's regional commercial and industrial centers are to be developed into mixed use, walkable destinations.

Plans remain in the works to turn the mall into a mixed-use office, medical and retail/restaurant complex.

In June 2026, Northlake Mall's remaining interior retail tenants were given lease-termination notices and ordered to vacate by June 29, effectively ending its operation as an enclosed retail mall.
