= Pam Stephenson =

American politician (1951–2024)

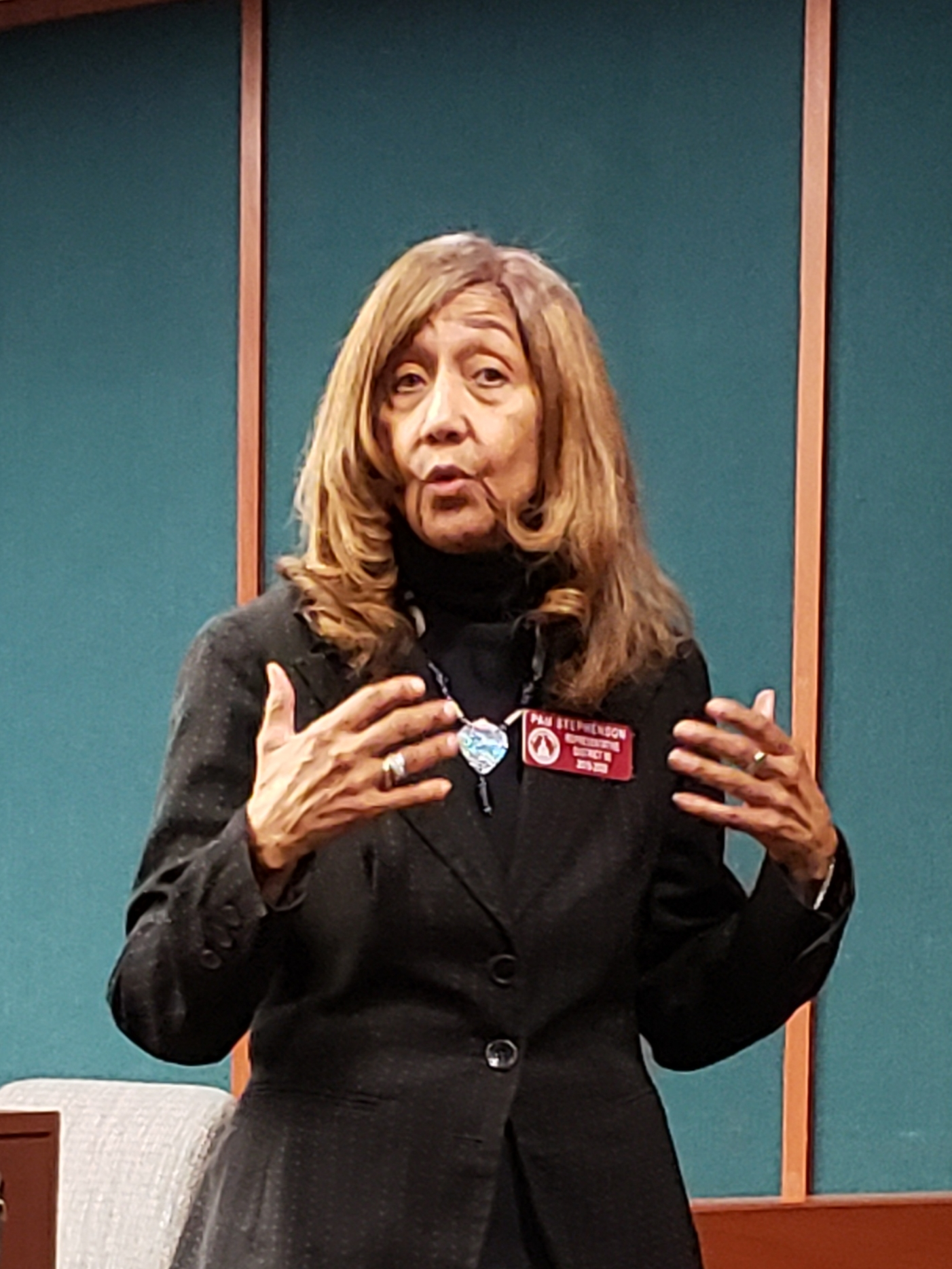

Member of the Georgia House of Representatives from the 90th district
- In office January 14, 2013 – September 10, 2020
- Preceded by: Howard Mosby
- Succeeded by: Angela Moore

Personal details
- Born: Pamela Sturdivant; May 11, 1951
- Died: June 17, 2024 (aged 73)
- Party: Democratic
- Education: University of Michigan, Eastern Michigan University
- Profession: Attorney at law
- Committees: Health and Human Services, Judiciary, MARTOC

Pamela Sturdivant Stephenson (May 11, 1951 – June 17, 2024) was an American politician from Georgia. Stephenson was a Democratic member of Georgia House of Representatives representing the state's 90th district, which includes parts of DeKalb and Rockdale counties. On September 10, 2020, Stephenson's daughter submitted a resignation on her behalf due to dementia.

The 90th district is 86% African American according to figures from the 2000 census.

== Background ==
=== Education ===
Stephenson received her undergraduate degree from Eastern Michigan University and has two master's degrees from the University of Michigan. She attended the Woodrow Wilson College of Law in Atlanta. There has been some debate over whether or not she graduated from law school. The registrar for the school does not show that she graduated.

=== Career ===
Stephenson was elected to the Georgia General Assembly in 2005. She had been the executive director of the State Health Planning agency and had served on the State Medical Education Board. She served on the Grady Memorial Hospital Corporation Board of Directors.

In 2018, Stephenson was hired to defend Asa North, who had been accused of causing the deaths of his children after leaving them in a hot car in Carroll County, Georgia. During the trial, she was accused of being "woefully unprepared". She did not subpoena any witnesses and repeatedly talked on her cell phone, even during opening statements. Affidavits state that the judge asked Stephensen if she was on pills. The family of Asa North has since hired another attorney. As a result of the case, on September 20, 2019, Stephenson was suspended from the practice of law in Georgia.

Stephenson won her primary in June 2020, and was running unopposed for her seat. However, her daughter, acting as her guardian with power of attorney, filed a resignation with the Georgia Governor's office on September 10, 2020. Stephenson was suffering from degenerative dementia. Stephenson died on June 17, 2024, at the age of 73.
