= Earnest Williams =

American politician

Earnest "Coach" Williams

Member of the Georgia House of Representatives from the 87th district
- In office 2002–2019
- Succeeded by: Viola Davis

Personal details
- Born: June 14, 1949 (age 77) Baker County, Georgia, United States
- Party: Democratic

Earnest "Coach" Williams (born June 14, 1949) is an American politician. A member of the Democratic party, he is a former member of the Georgia House of Representatives from the 87th District, serving from 2002 to January 2019. He was defeated in the Democratic Primary by Viola Davis.
