= Georgia's 90th House of Representatives district =

State district in Georgia, USA

Georgia's 90th State House of Representatives district
Representative
Saira Draper; D–Atlanta
- Demographics: 25.4% White; 68.1% Black; 2.9% Hispanic; 1.3% Asian
- Population: 56,800

District 90 elects one member of the Georgia House of Representatives. It contains parts of DeKalb County.

== Demographics ==
The 90th district was previously 86% African-American according to figures from the 2000 census.

== Members ==
- Howard Mosby (until 2013)
- Pam Stephenson (2013–2020)
- Angela Moore (2021–2023)
- Saira Draper (since 2023)
