= Angela Moore =

American politician

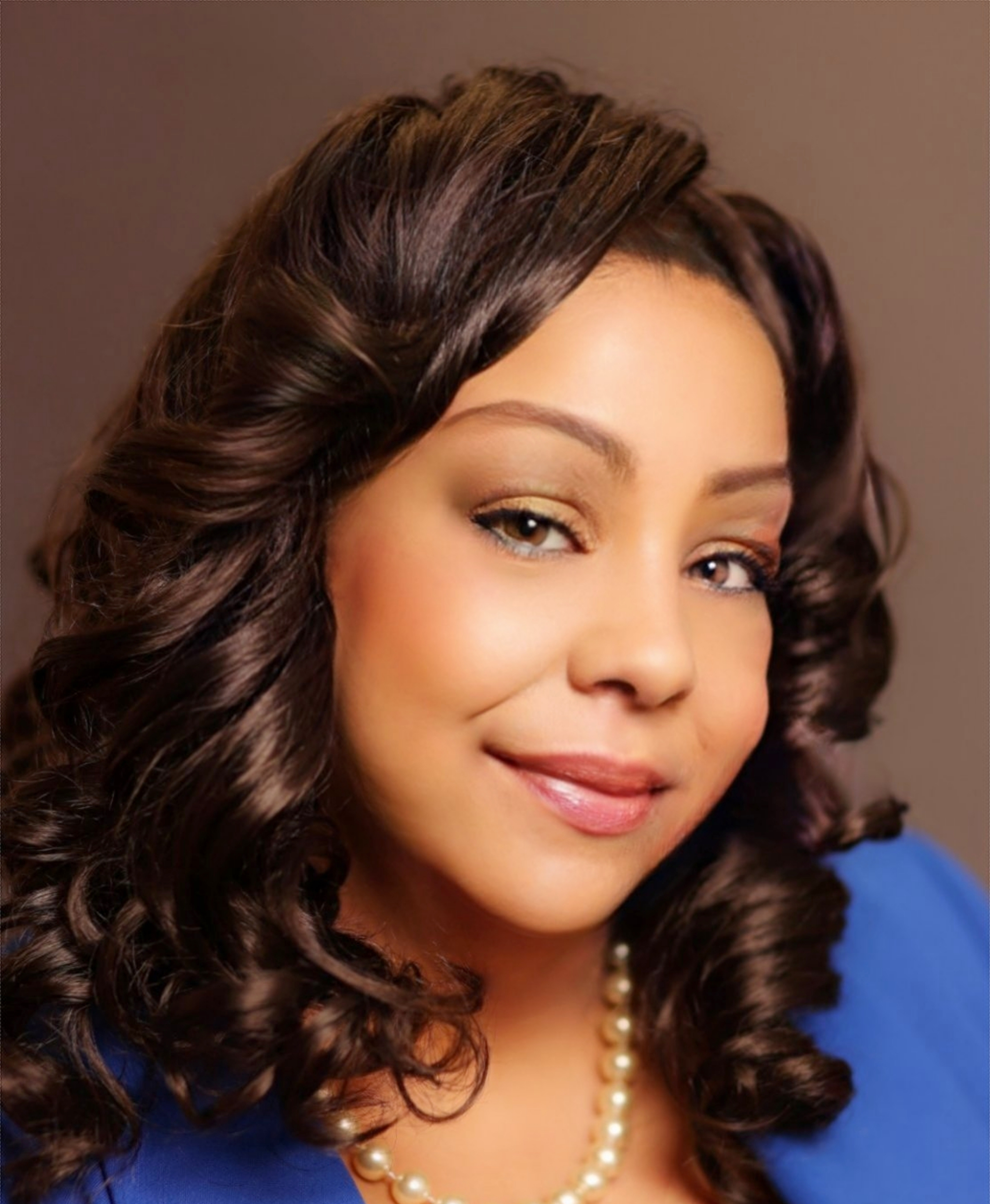

Member of the Georgia House of Representatives
- Incumbent
- Assumed office March 16, 2021
- Preceded by: Pam Stephenson
- Constituency: 90th district (2021–2023); 91st district (2023–Present)

Personal details
- Born: October 4, 1972 (age 53) Washington, D.C., U.S.
- Party: Democratic
- Website: Representative Angela Moore, 2023-2024 Regular Session

Angela Moore is an American politician serving as a Democratic member of the Georgia House of Representatives, since March 2021. She assumed office following a victory in a 2021 special election in District 90.

== Controversies ==
In 2024, Moore faced criticism for falsely claiming to be a member of the sorority Delta Sigma Theta. Moore apologized after the sorority asserted that there were "no records to support her membership." She also apologized for lying about her status as a veteran and an OB-GYN.

Georgia House of Representatives
| Preceded by Pam Stephenson | Member of the Georgia House of Representatives from the 90th district 2021–2023 | Succeeded by Saira Draper |
| Preceded by Rhonda Taylor | Member of the Georgia House of Representatives from the 91st district 2023–Present | Incumbent |
