= Friends School of Atlanta =

Quaker school in Decatur, Georgia, United States

The Friends School of Atlanta
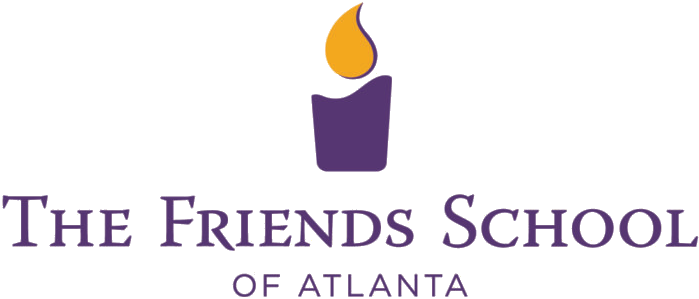

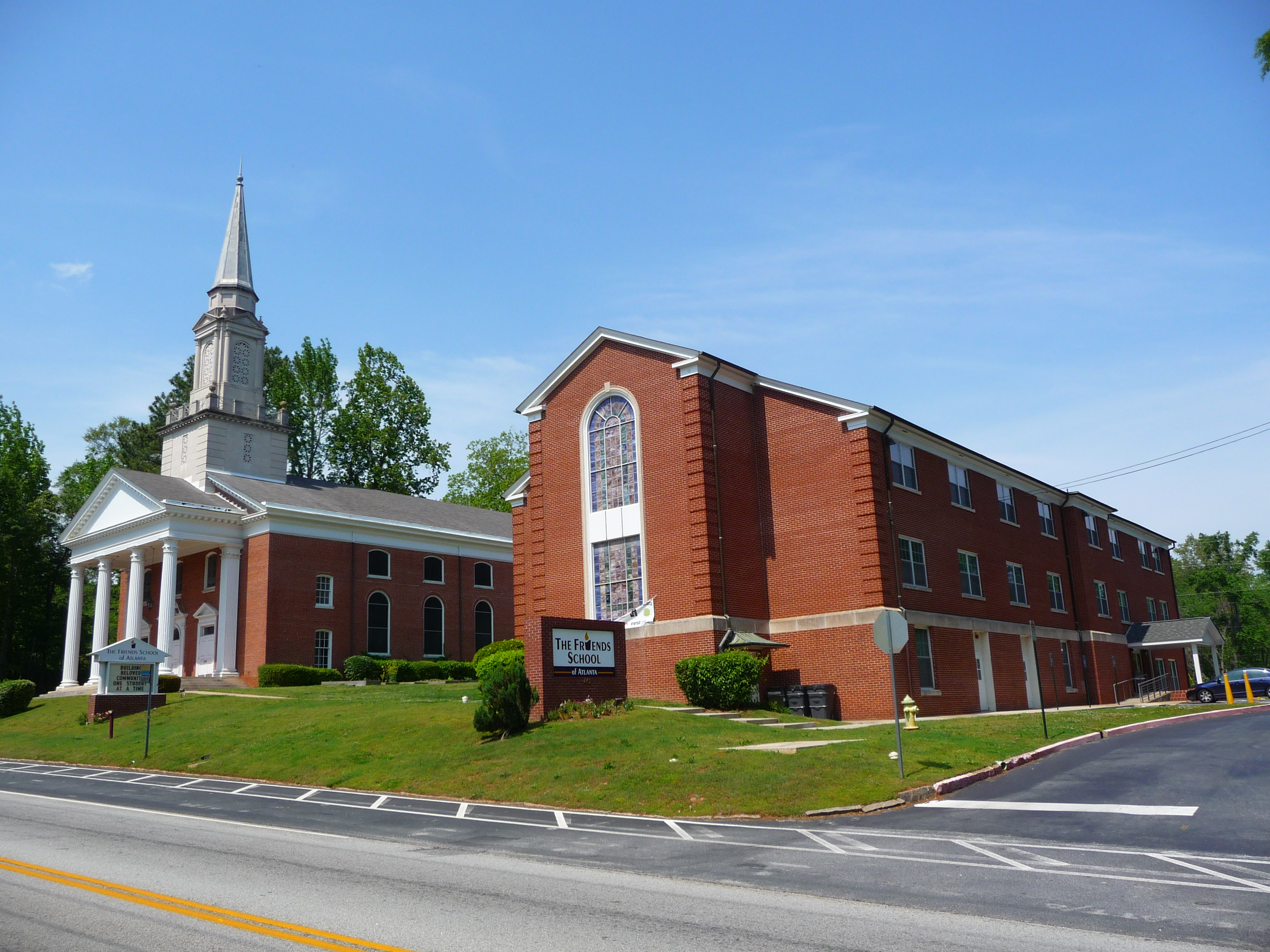
- The Friends School of Atlanta in 2011

Location
- 862 Columbia Drive; Decatur, Georgia 30030; United States
- Coordinates: 33°45′41″N 84°16′38″W

Information
- Denomination: Quaker
- Established: 1991
- Head of school: Dot López
- Teaching staff: 44 (as of 2018-19)
- Grades: Pre-kindergarten–8
- Gender: Co-ed
- Enrollment: 169 (as of 2018-19)
- Student to teacher ratio: 8:1 (as of 2018-19)
- Colors: Purple and gold
- Mascot: Quakes
- Website: friendsschoolatlanta.org

The Friends School of Atlanta (FSA) is a private school in Decatur, Georgia that enrolls students from Pre-kindergarten through 8th grade.

== History ==
The Atlanta Friends Meeting was organized in 1943, and in the late 1950s, it purchased a residence on Fairview Road in the historic Druid Hills neighborhood. In addition to providing a gathering place for Friends, the Meetinghouse was one of the few sites in the city available for interracial meetings and education. In 1990, the Meeting built a new facility near the border of Atlanta and the City of Decatur.

The Friends School of Atlanta, which was incorporated as a nonprofit institution in 1990, grew out of the work of a committee of the Meeting. In 1991, the Friends School of Atlanta's Board of Trustees called Waman French, an educator with experience at Brooklyn Friends School and Atlanta International School, to be the first Head of School. Meeting members are active in the school's board of trustees and offer guidance and support to the school in many ways.

Leasing space in the newly constructed Friends Meetinghouse at West Howard and Adair Streets in Decatur, the school opened in the fall of 1991 with 37 students, ages 4½ through eight, and three teachers.

A key to the early success of the school has been — and continues to be — the strong involvement of parents, whose efforts have included providing administrative and secretarial assistance in the office, coordinating a hot lunch program, building the playground, serving on committees, and taking part in policy development.

The school stayed at the Meetinghouse for five years, expanding by one grade per year and adding portable classrooms on the property. In 1995, two classes relocated to the First Christian Church in downtown Decatur. In 1996, the entire school moved there while awaiting the renovation of its permanent space.

In 1997, the school moved to 121 Sams Street in Decatur, at first using one half of the building, sharing space with S & A Industries until 2001, when the other half of the building was renovated, including a Meeting room for the whole school and community events.

After eight years as Head of School, Waman French decided to return to working with children in the middle school in 1999. The Board of Trustees appointed Marcia Pauly as its next Head of School. With a rich educational background, most recently with Decatur City Schools, she led FSA into the twenty-first century. Reluctantly, Pauly stepped down as Head in June 2001 for personal reasons.

In July 2001, James D. Withers became the next Head of the Friends School of Atlanta. He is a long-time Atlanta educator, President of Withers Consulting Services, and former Academic Dean at Pace Academy. Upon taking the helm at FSA, Withers left his consulting business, where he had worked with public and private organizations in mediation, conflict resolution, and team-building. Withers stepped aside as Head in May 2003, and Waman French returned as interim Head for the 2003–04 school year. French was subsequently chosen by the Head Search committee to continue as Head of School. Under his leadership, the Board of Trustees began a search for a possible new location to relocate and grow the school.

In 2007, the Friends School of Atlanta began a capital campaign to purchase and renovate a new school site at 862 Columbia Drive. The school moved to its new home in the 2008–09 school year. The new location is larger and is enhanced by two playgrounds and an enclosed gymnasium.

The 2022–23 school year was Waman French's last year with The Friends School of Atlanta. Dorothy "Dot" López is the new head of school for The Friends School of Atlanta.

== Campus ==
The Friends School of Atlanta occupies what was formerly the New Orleans Baptist Theological Seminary. The campus includes the main building, a lower parking lot and an upper parking lot, a gym, a play structure and upper field, a community garden, and a space formerly used for outdoor classrooms. The main building consists of three floors. The first floor consists of the administrative wing, the middle school cafeteria, the main lobby, an art room, an innovation lab, and a seating area. The second floor consists of the elementary school classrooms (PK–4), the library, a community meeting room, and a music room. The third floor consists of the middle school classrooms (5–8).

The gym includes a main lobby, bathrooms, and two offices.

== Extracurricular activities ==
FSA offers a variety of after-school clubs. These have included activities such as art, drama, yoga, music lessons, drones, robots, MineCrafting, textiles, and creative writing.

The school also has four competitive sports teams (the Quakes) for students in grades 5-8: basketball, ultimate frisbee, track, and volleyball.
