= Tonya Anderson =

American politician

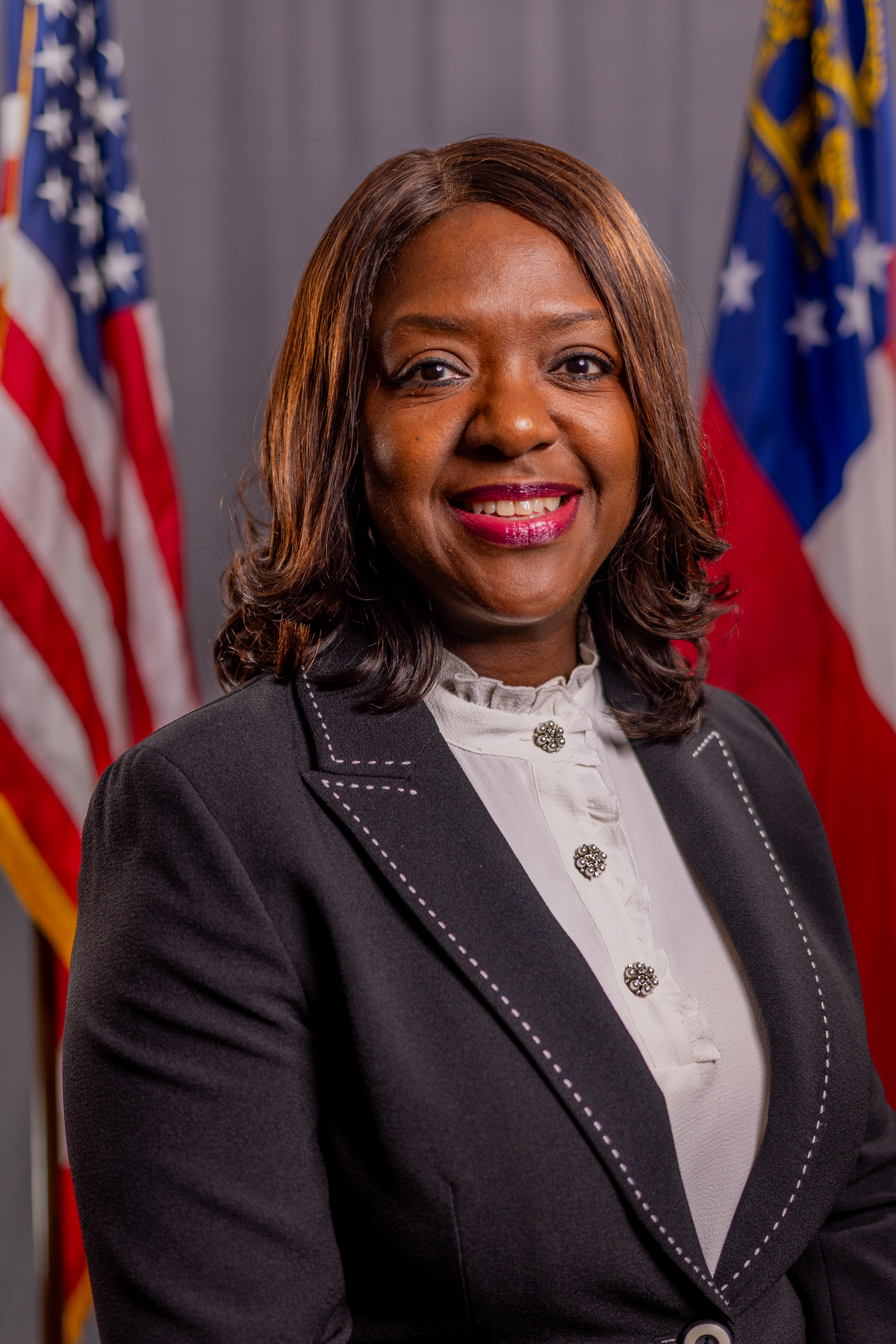

Member of the Georgia State Senate from the 43rd district
- Incumbent
- Assumed office January 9, 2017
- Preceded by: JaNice Van Ness

Member of the Georgia House of Representatives from the 92nd district
- In office January 14, 2013 – September 14, 2015
- Preceded by: Pam Stephenson (redistricting)
- Succeeded by: Doreen Carter

Personal details
- Born: July 16, 1969 (age 57)
- Party: Democratic
- Education: Alabama State University; Luther Rice University
- Profession: Pastor

Tonya Peterson Anderson (born July 16, 1969) is an American pastor and politician who serves in the Georgia State Senate. She previously served in the Georgia House of Representatives, from 2013 to 2015. She is a member of the Democratic Party.

She earned a Bachelor of Science, Business Administration and Management from Alabama State University in 1992 and a Master of Divinity from Luther Rice College & Seminary in 2008.

Anderson was a candidate for District 43 of the Georgia State Senate in the 2016 election. She advanced to a runoff election against Dee Dawkins-Haigler. Anderson led Dawkins-Haigler in the official vote count by 0.12 percent (4,276 votes to 4,266 votes), leading to Georgia Secretary of State Brian Kemp to order a recount. The recount confirmed Anderson's victory over Dawkins-Haigler by 10 votes.

Anderson defeated Republican incumbent Janice Frey Van Ness. The two women faced off prior in a December 2015 run- off, resulting in a very narrow win for Van Ness. Anderson was sworn into the State Senate on January 9, 2017. Before serving in the legislature, Anderson served as the mayor of Lithonia. Anderson has served in the Air Force Reserves. She also served as Chair of the Georgia Women's Legislative Caucus.
