= Embry Hills, Georgia =

- Unincorporated community
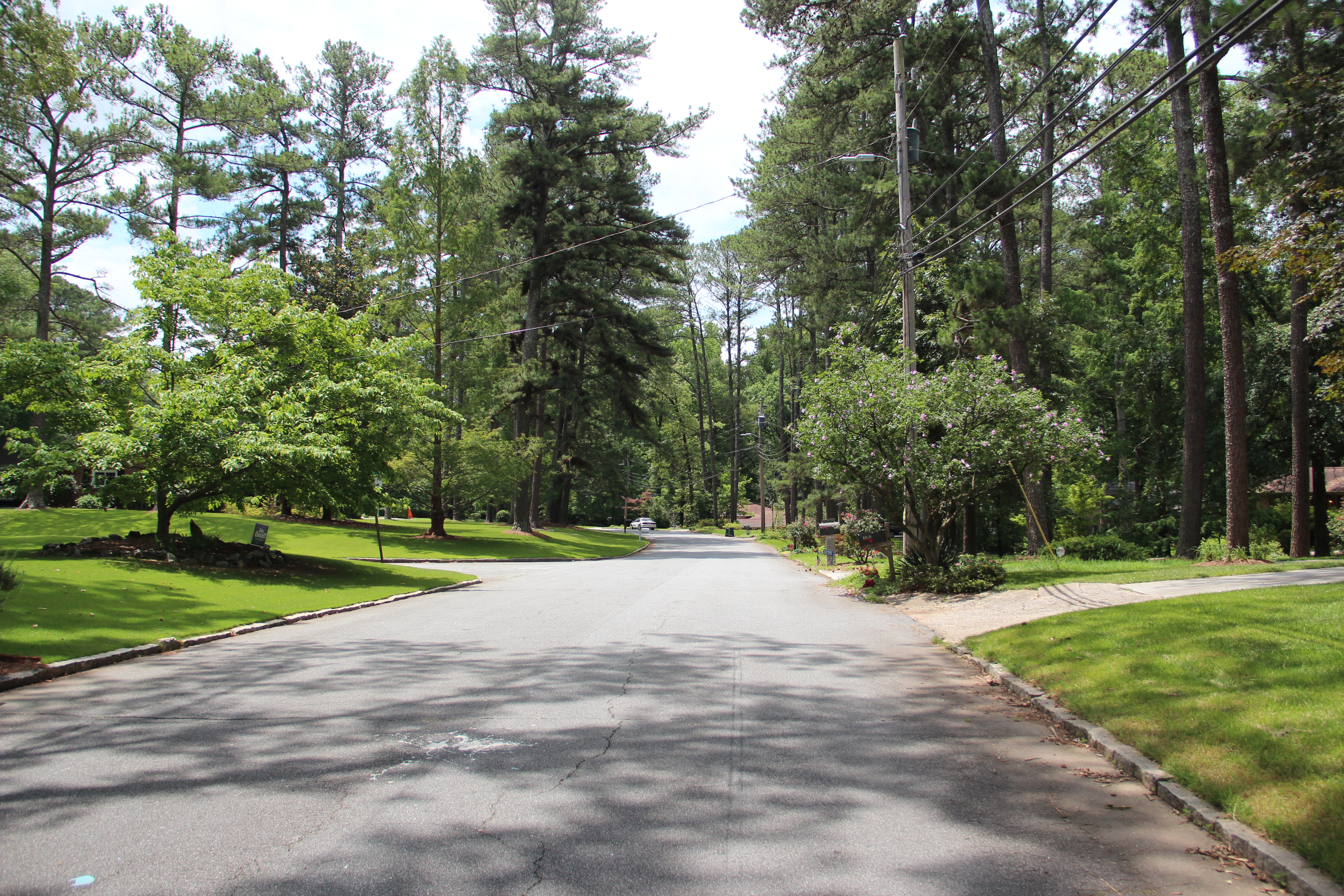
- A neighborhood in Embry Hills

- Location within the state of Georgia Embry Hills (the United States)
- Coordinates: 33°52′53″N 84°15′21″W
- Country: United States
- State: Georgia
- County: DeKalb
- Elevation: 906 ft (276 m)
- Time zone: UTC-5 (Eastern (EST))
  - Summer (DST): UTC-4 (EDT)
- ZIP codes: 30341

Embry Hills is a neighborhood in northern unincorporated DeKalb County, Georgia, United States, near the intersection of I-85 and I-285. The neighborhood has a mix of middle-class young families and retirees. Embry Hills is located south of Doraville, east of Chamblee, and north of Tucker, but is not considered part of any of the three cities, although many area businesses and residences use a Chamblee address.

== History ==
In the mid-1950s, three sibling developers (Jack, James and Neal Embry, for whom the neighborhood is named) purchased 600 acres of farmland east of what is now I-85. Starting in 1957, the Embrys built the 700-800 homes in the neighborhood. They also built several apartment complexes on the acreage. The Embry Hills Club was built in 1958. The land was bisected by I-285 in the 1960s. In 1963, the first phase of the Embry Hills retail district was built. The Embry National Bank (now United Community Bank) soon followed. DeKalb County Public Library recently constructed the new Embry Hills Library, replacing the neighborhood branch that opened in 1990.

== Transportation ==
Public transportation is available at the Doraville MARTA station. Interstate access from I-85 and I-285 is through the Pleasantdale Road and Chamblee Tucker Road exits, respectively. Surface street access is through Chamblee Tucker and Henderson Mill Roads.
