= Georgia's 92nd House of Representatives district =

State district in Georgia, USA

Georgia's 92nd State House of Representatives district
Representative
Rhonda Taylor; D–Conyers
- Demographics: 14.8% White; 72.7% Black; 10.1% Hispanic; 0.5% Asian
- Population: 57,417

District 92 elects one member of the Georgia House of Representatives. It contains parts of Rockdale County.

== Members ==
- Tonya Anderson (2013–2015)
- Doreen Carter (2015–2023)
- Rhonda Taylor (since 2023)
