= Doreen Carter =

American politician from Georgia (born 1963)

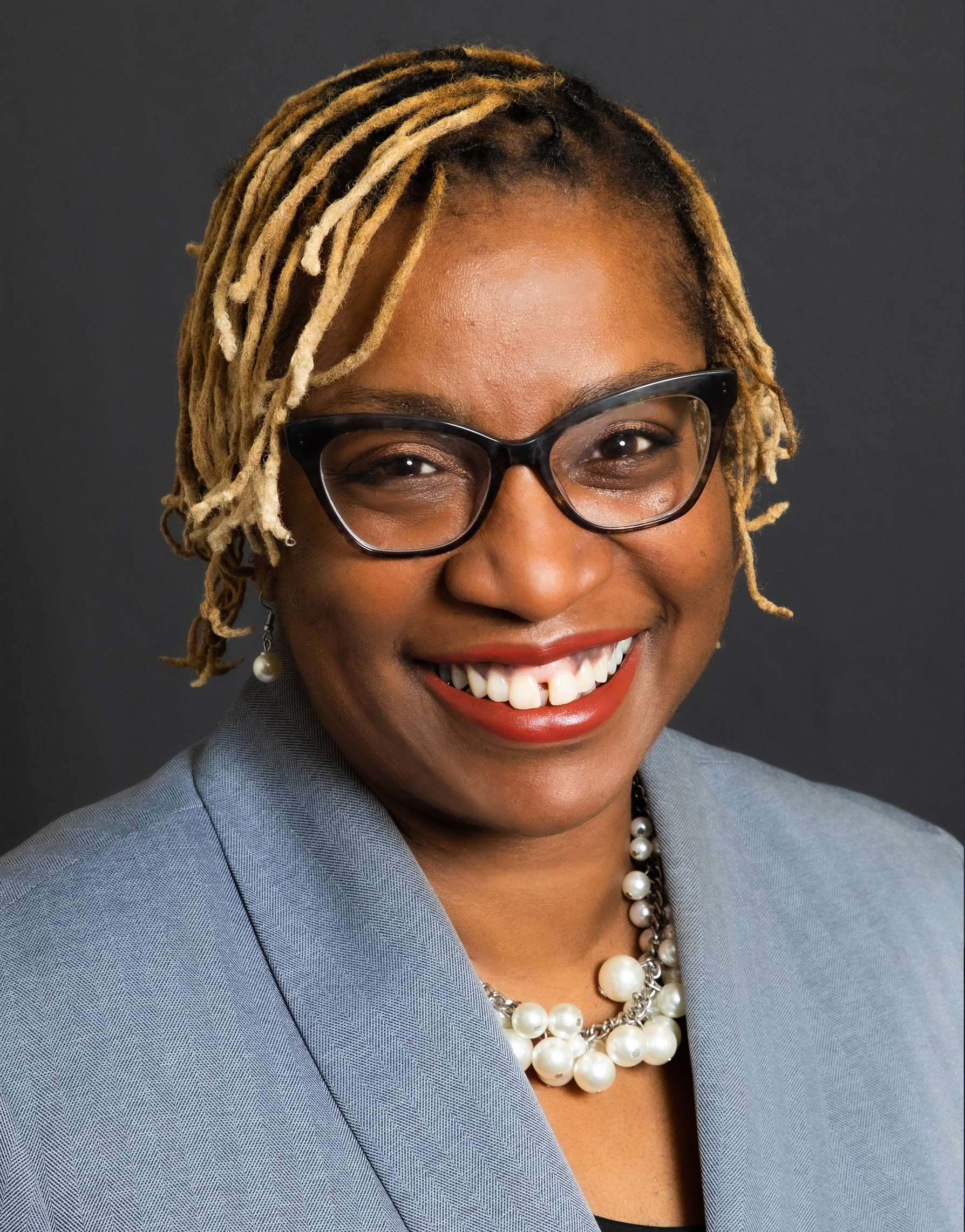
- Carter 2020

Member of the Georgia House of Representatives
- Incumbent
- Assumed office November 12, 2015
- Preceded by: Tonya Anderson
- Constituency: 92nd District (2015–2023); 93rd District (2023–Present)

Member of the Lithonia City Council
- In office 2007–2011

Personal details
- Born: March 19, 1963 (age 63) DeKalb County, Georgia, U.S.
- Party: Democratic
- Occupation: Nonprofit Executive, Financial Educator, and Coach
- Committees: Agriculture & Consumer Affairs Code Revision Education Industry and Labor Small Business Development Special Rules

Doreen Roberson Carter (born March 19, 1963) is an American politician from the state of Georgia. A member of the Democratic Party, she is a member of the Georgia House of Representatives representing the state's 93rd district.

== Political career ==
Carter sat on the City Council in Lithonia, Georgia from 2007 to 2011.

In 2012, Carter ran for election to represent District 92 in the Georgia House of Representatives, but lost a five-way Democratic primary. In 2014, she ran for Secretary of State, but lost the general election to Brian Kemp.

In 2015, former 92nd district representative Tonya Anderson resigned to run for a seat in the State Senate. Carter ran for the seat again, and won. She was reelected unopposed in 2016 and 2018, and was elected again in 2020.

As of July 2020, Carter sits on the following committees:

- Agriculture & Consumer Affairs
- Code Revision
- Education
- Industry and Labor
- Small Business Development
- Special Rules

Party political offices
Preceded by Georganna Sinkfield	Democratic nominee for Secretary of State of Georgia; 2014	Succeeded by John Barrow
Georgia House of Representatives
Preceded by Tonya Anderson	Member of the Georgia House of Representatives from the 92nd district 2015–2023	Succeeded by Rhonda Taylor
Preceded by Dar'shun Kendrick	Member of the Georgia House of Representatives from the 93rd district 2023–Present	Incumbent
