= Rhonda Taylor =

American politician from Georgia

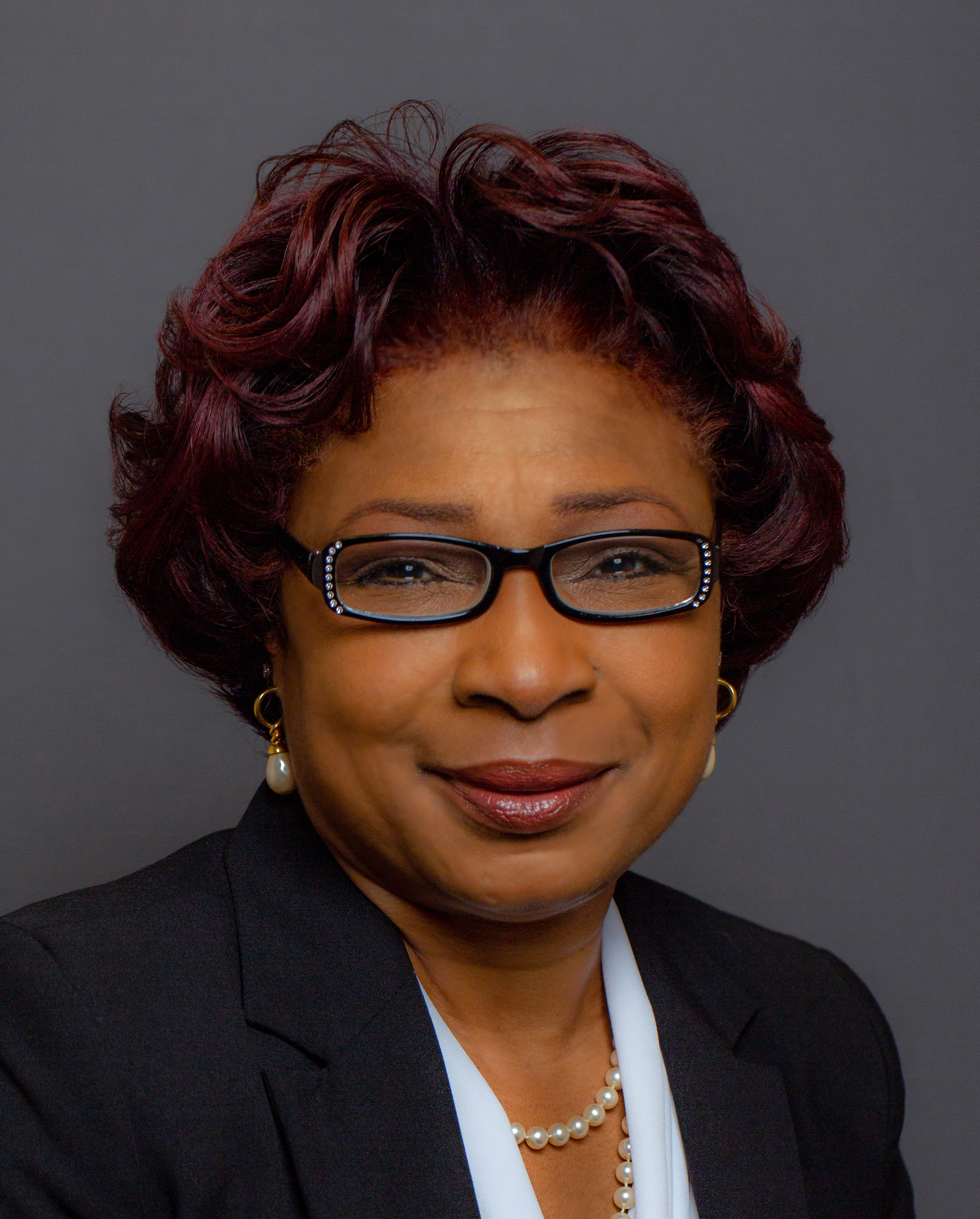

Member of the Georgia House of Representatives
- Incumbent
- Assumed office January 11, 2021
- Preceded by: Vernon Jones
- Constituency: 91st District (2021–2023); 92nd District (2023–Present)

Personal details
- Born: September 4, 1965 (age 60)
- Party: Democratic

Rhonda S. Taylor (born September 4, 1965) is an American politician from Georgia. Taylor is a Democratic member of Georgia House of Representatives for District 91.

Georgia House of Representatives
Preceded by Vernon Jones	Member of the Georgia House of Representatives from the 91st district 2021–2023	Succeeded by Angela Moore
Preceded by Doreen Carter	Member of the Georgia House of Representatives from the 92nd district 2023–Present	Incumbent
