= 1946 Georgia gubernatorial election =

1946 Georgia Democratic gubernatorial primary
- July 17, 1946

410 county unit votes 206 unit votes needed to win
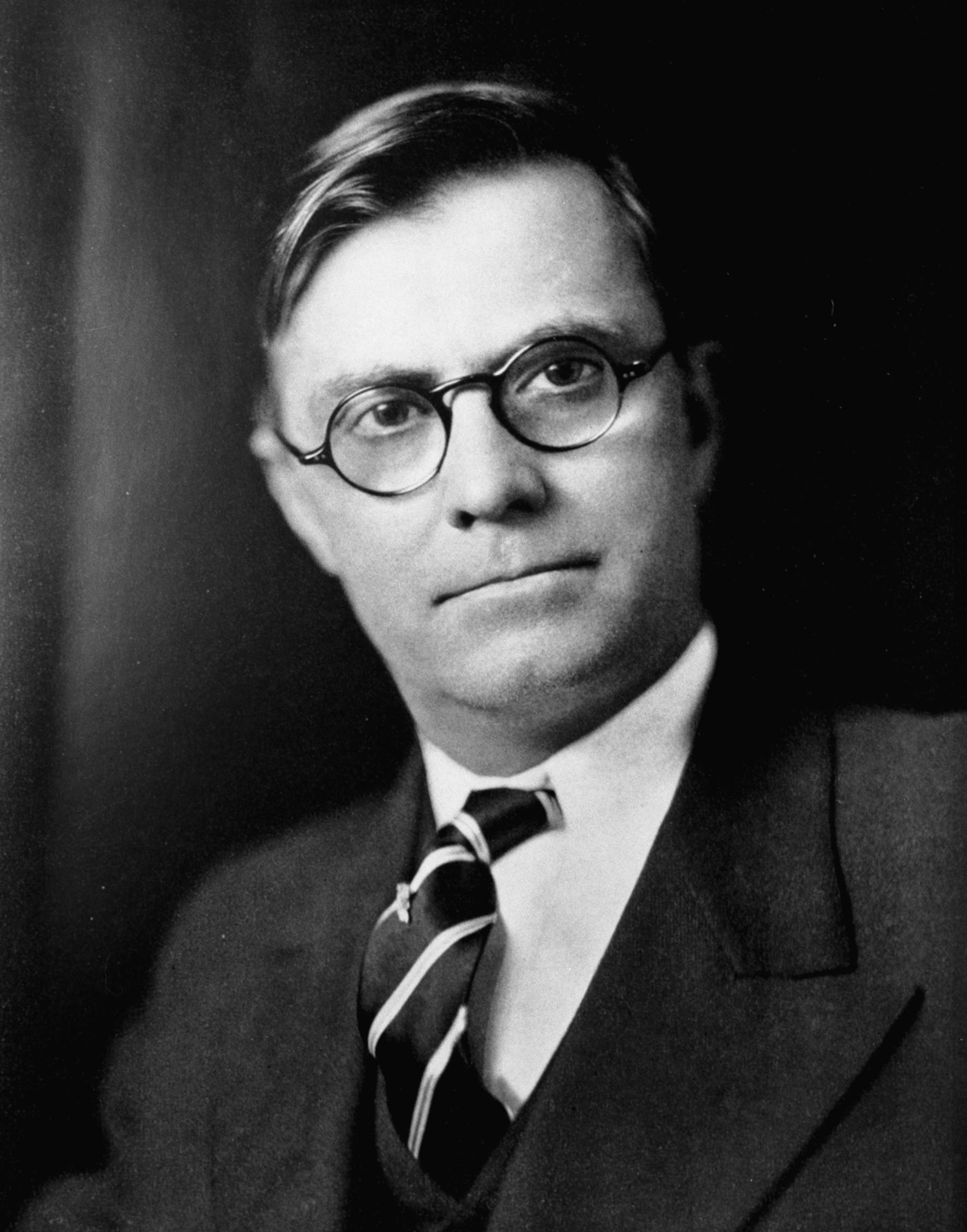

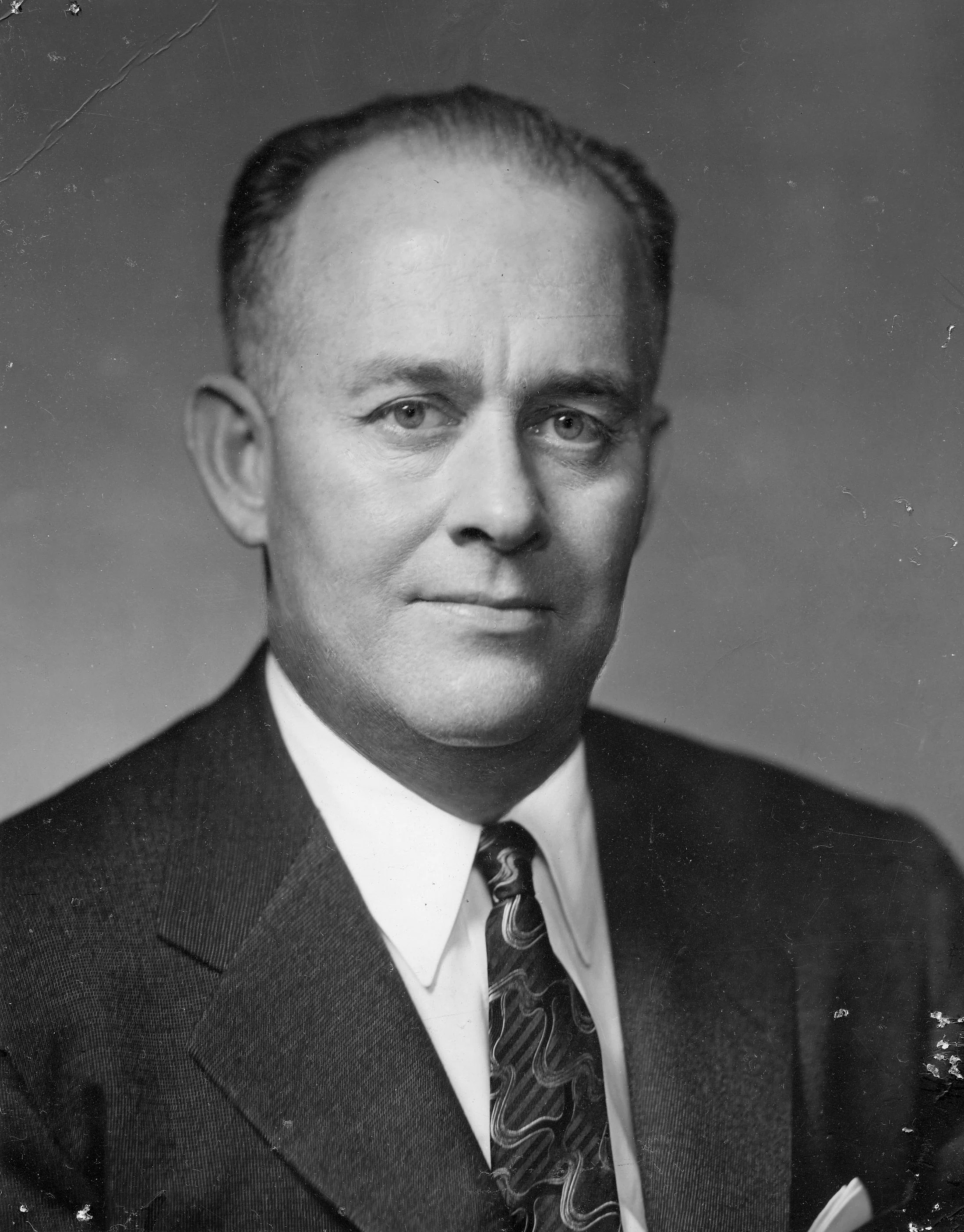

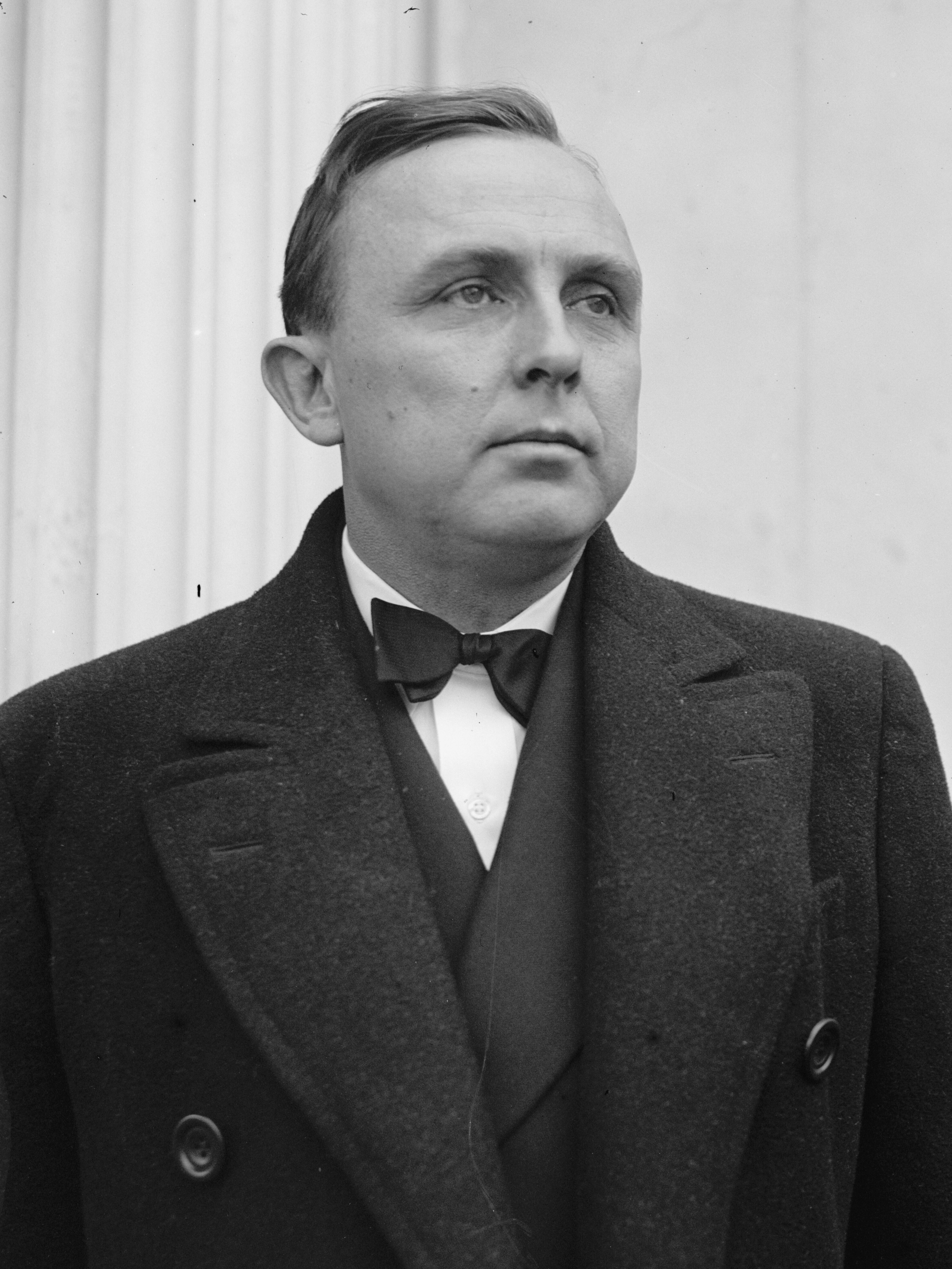
Nominee	Eugene Talmadge	James V. Carmichael	Eurith D. Rivers
Party	Democratic	Democratic	Democratic
Electoral vote	244	144	22
Popular vote	297,245	313,389	69,489
Percentage	42.96%	45.30%	10.04%
- County results Talmadge: 40–50% 50–60% 60–70% 70–80% 80–90% Carmichael: 30–40% 40–50% 50–60% 60–70% 70–80% Rivers: 30–40% 40–50% 50–60% 60–70% 80–90% >90%
Governor before election
Ellis Arnall
Democratic
Elected Governor
Melvin E. Thompson (Note: Eugene Talmadge was elected to a third term in 1946, but died before taking office. Ellis Arnall, governor at the time, claimed the office, as did Lieutenant Governor Melvin Thompson. The state legislature chose Eugene Talmadge's son, Herman Talmadge, to be governor, but during what came to be called the "three governors controversy", the state supreme court declared this unconstitutional and declared Thompson rightful governor, and Talmadge stepped down after 67 days. Talmadge later defeated Thompson in a special election.)
Democratic

The 1946 Georgia gubernatorial election took place on November 5, 1946, in order to elect the governor of Georgia.

Incumbent Democratic governor Ellis Arnall was term-limited, and ineligible to run for a second term before spending four years out of office (thus in 1950).

As was common at the time, the Democratic candidate ran with only token opposition in the general election so therefore the Democratic primary was the real contest, and winning the primary was considered tantamount to election. The Republican Party was utterly unviable in Georgia at the time, and had not even nominated a candidate of its own.

The election was won by the Democratic nominee and former governor Eugene Talmadge, who died weeks later in mid-December, before his scheduled inauguration in January 1947. Talmadge's death created the three governors controversy in Georgia.

== Democratic primary ==
The Democratic primary election was held on July 17, 1946. As Talmadge won a majority of county unit votes, there was no run-off.

=== County unit system ===
From 1917 until 1962, the Democratic Party in the U.S. state of Georgia used a voting system called the county unit system to determine victors in statewide primary elections.

The system was ostensibly designed to function similarly to the Electoral College, but in practice the large ratio of unit votes for small, rural counties to unit votes for more populous urban areas provided outsized political influence to the smaller counties.

Under the county unit system, the 159 counties in Georgia were divided by population into three categories. The largest eight counties were classified as "Urban", the next-largest 30 counties were classified as "Town", and the remaining 121 counties were classified as "Rural". Urban counties were given 6 unit votes, Town counties were given 4 unit votes, and Rural counties were given 2 unit votes, for a total of 410 available unit votes. Each county's unit votes were awarded on a winner-take-all basis.

Candidates were required to obtain a majority of unit votes (not necessarily a majority of the popular vote), or 206 total unit votes, to win the election. If no candidate received a majority in the initial primary, a runoff election was held between the top two candidates to determine a winner.

=== Candidates ===
- James V. Carmichael, businessman and former state representative
- Hoke O'Kelley, businessman
- Eurith D. Rivers, former governor
- Eugene Talmadge, former governor

=== Results ===
Candidate	Popular vote		County unit vote	
Candidate	Votes	%	Votes	%
Eugene Talmadge	297,245	42.96	244	59.51
James V. Carmichael	313,389	45.30	144	35.12
Eurith D. Rivers	69,489	10.04	22	5.37
Hoke O'Kelley	11,758	1.70		
Total	691,881	100.00	410	100.00

== General election ==
In the general election, Talmadge faced token opposition.

However, from October 3, Talmadge began to suffer from stomach hemorrhages and was unable to attend the state convention in October in Macon.

The 1945 state constitution required a candidate receive a majority of votes to be elected governor; if no one had a majority, the General Assembly was to hold a contingent election between the top two candidates "who shall be in life, and shall not decline an election". Talmadge supporters believed this would require the General Assembly to choose between the second- and third-placed candidates in case of his death, and thus prepared by organizing enough write-in votes to ensure his son Herman Talmadge would take part.

=== Results ===
D. Talmadge Bowers was a Republican.

1946 Georgia gubernatorial election
Party	Candidate	Votes	%	±%
Democratic	Eugene Talmadge	143,279	98.54%	
Write-in	Herman Talmadge	675	0.46%	
Write-in	James V. Carmichael	669	0.46%	
Write-in	D. Talmadge Bowers	637	0.44%	
Write-in	Ellis Arnall	122	0.08%	
Write-in	Eurith D. Rivers	6	0.00%	
Write-in	Hoke O'Kelley	4	0.00%	
Write-in	All others	11	0.01%	
Turnout		145,403	100.00%	
Democratic hold		Swing		

== Aftermath ==
On December 21, 1946, Talmadge died before taking office. The state constitution did not specify who would assume the governorship in such a situation, so three men made claims to the governorship: Ellis Arnall, the outgoing governor; Melvin E. Thompson, the lieutenant governor-elect; and Herman Talmadge, Eugene Talmadge's son.

The General Assembly met to certify the election on January 14, 1947. When the returns were first opened, Republican write-in Talmadge Bowers was second, with James Carmichael third and Herman Talmadge fourth. However, additional write-in votes were discovered for Herman Talmadge from his home county of Telfair, probably the result of electoral fraud, and in the official results he was second.

The General Assembly then declined to certify Eugene Talmadge as the winner, instead resolving that "no person had a majority of the whole number of votes" because of his death. It immediately proceeded to the contingent election between the top two living candidates. Carmichael declined to participate; Talmadge opponents voted present out of protest.

1946 Georgia gubernatorial election - legislative election
Party	Candidate	Votes	%
Democratic	Herman Talmadge	161	64.92
	Abstain	87	35.08
Total votes		248	100.00

Thompson appealed to the Supreme Court of Georgia. The court ruled in March 1947 that Eugene Talmadge's death did not change the fact that a majority of votes had been cast for him, and the General Assembly had violated the constitution by resolving there was no majority. It defined the General Assembly's role in certification as purely ministerial, and held that the constitution did not allow it any discretion in the process, including considering the death of a candidate.

Ironically, the court then resolved the initial controversy of who should have been governor after certification in favor of Ellis Arnall; since the constitution defined the gubernatorial term as four years but stipulated it does not expire until a successor is "chosen and qualified", and a dead person is not qualified, the court held Arnall should have continued serving as governor. However, he had voluntarily resigned any claim to the office on January 18 to make way for Thompson. At that point, the court held, power devolved on the duly elected lieutenant governor.

In a 1985 interview, Arnall admitted he shared the interpretation that he could continue in office for up to another full term, but had little interest in doing so. Before he resigned, wanting to avoid "plung[ing] the state into a banana republic war", he first contacted an unnamed Supreme Court justice to ensure the court was likely to rule against the legislature, and thus would find his resignation would transfer power to Thompson.

The constitution required a special election to complete the 1947–1951 gubernatorial term "at the next general election for members of the General Assembly", which was in November 1948.

== Bibliography ==
- Bullock, Charles S.; Buchanan, Scott E.; Gaddie, Ronald Keith (2015). The Three Governors Controversy: Skullduggery, Machinations, and the Decline of Georgia's Progressive Politics. Athens: University of Georgia Press. ISBN 978-0-8203-4734-9.
- Congressional Quarterly (1998). Gubernatorial Elections, 1787-1997. Washington: Congressional Quarterly. ISBN 1-56802-396-0.
- Georgia Department of Archives and History (1950). Hays, J.E. (ed.). Georgia's Official Register, 1945-1950. Atlanta: Georgia Department of Archives and History – via Internet Archive.
- Glashan, Roy R. (1979). American Governors and Gubernatorial Elections, 1775-1978. Meckler Books. ISBN 0-930466-17-9.
- Henderson, Harold P. (1991). The Politics of Change in Georgia: A Political Biography of Ellis Arnall. Athens: University of Georgia Press. ISBN 0-8203-1306-8.
- Kytle, Calvin; Mackay, James A. (1998). Who Runs Georgia?. Athens: University of Georgia Press. ISBN 9780820319865.
- Novotny, Patrick (2007). This Georgia Rising: Education, Civil Rights, and the Politics of Change in Georgia in the 1940s. Macon, Georgia: Mercer University Press. ISBN 978-0-88146-088-9.
