= 1948 Georgia gubernatorial special election =

1948 Georgia Democratic gubernatorial primary
- September 8, 1948

410 county unit votes 206 unit votes needed to win
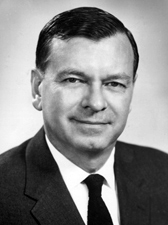

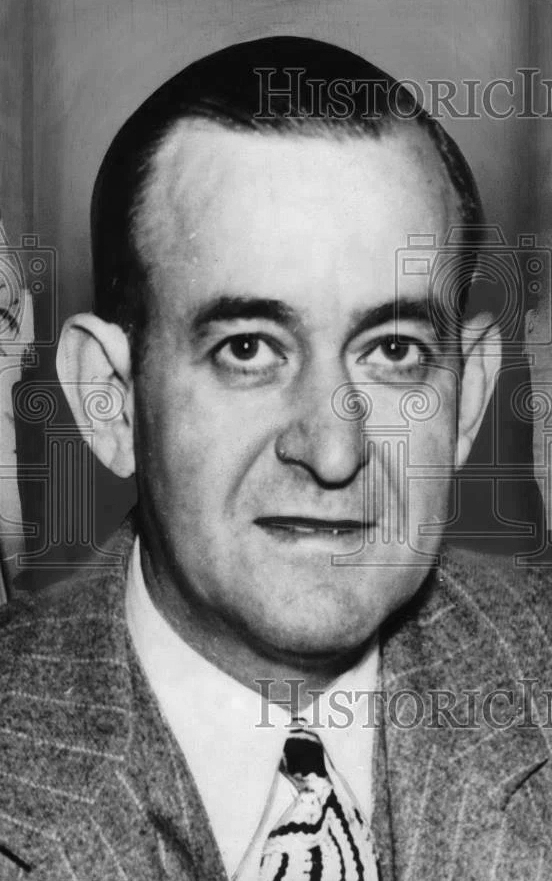
Nominee	Herman Talmadge	Melvin E. Thompson
Party	Democratic	Democratic
Electoral vote	312	98
Popular vote	357,865	312,035
Percentage	51.77%	45.14%
- County results Talmadge: 40–50% 50–60% 60–70% 70–80% 80–90% Thompson: 40–50% 50–60% 60–70% 70–80%
Governor before election
Melvin E. Thompson
Democratic
Elected Governor
Herman Talmadge
Democratic

The 1948 Georgia gubernatorial special election took place on November 2, 1948, in order to elect the Governor of Georgia.

The Supreme Court of Georgia resolved the three governors controversy in the wake of the 1946 election by affirming lieutenant governor-elect Melvin E. Thompson's succession to the office of governor. The state constitution in effect at the time then required a special election to be held simultaneously with the next state legislative election to fill the remainder of the term.

Herman Talmadge, the son of the winner of the 1946 election, the late Eugene Talmadge, defeated Governor Thompson in the Democratic primary by a margin of 51.8% to 45.1% with three other candidates getting 3.1% of the vote and then proceeded to win the general election with 97.51% of the vote.

As was common at the time, the Democratic candidate ran with only token opposition in the general election so therefore the Democratic primary was the real contest, and winning the primary was considered tantamount to election.

== Democratic primary ==
The Democratic primary election was held on September 8, 1948. As Talmadge won a majority of county unit votes, there was no run-off.

=== County unit system ===
From 1917 until 1962, the Democratic Party in the U.S. state of Georgia used a voting system called the county unit system to determine victors in statewide primary elections.

The system was ostensibly designed to function similarly to the Electoral College, but in practice the large ratio of unit votes for small, rural counties to unit votes for more populous urban areas provided outsized political influence to the smaller counties.

Under the county unit system, the 159 counties in Georgia were divided by population into three categories. The largest eight counties were classified as "Urban", the next-largest 30 counties were classified as "Town", and the remaining 121 counties were classified as "Rural". Urban counties were given 6 unit votes, Town counties were given 4 unit votes, and Rural counties were given 2 unit votes, for a total of 410 available unit votes. Each county's unit votes were awarded on a winner-take-all basis.

Candidates were required to obtain a majority of unit votes (not necessarily a majority of the popular vote), or 206 total unit votes, to win the election. If no candidate received a majority in the initial primary, a runoff election was held between the top two candidates to determine a winner.

=== Candidates ===
- Hoke O'Kelley, businessman
- Joseph A. Rabun, pastor
- Herman Talmadge, former Governor, removed from office during the three governors controversy
- Melvin E. Thompson, incumbent Governor
- Hoke Willis, railroad clerk

=== Results ===
Candidate	Popular vote		County unit vote	
Candidate	Votes	%	Votes	%
Herman Talmadge	357,865	51.77	312	76.10
Melvin E. Thompson	312,035	45.14	98	23.90
Hoke O'Kelley	13,226	1.91		
Hoke Willis	4,963	0.72		
Joseph A. Rabun	3,150	0.46		
Total	691,239	100.00	410	100.00

== General election ==
In the general election, Talmadge faced token opposition.

=== Results ===
Barfoot was a candidate of the Progressive Party.

1948 Georgia gubernatorial special election
Party	Candidate	Votes	%	±%
Democratic	Herman Talmadge	354,711	97.51%	
Write-in	Morgan Blake	8,017	2.20%	
Write-in	James L. Barfoot	665	0.18%	
Write-in	Melvin E. Thompson	324	0.09%	
Write-in	Ralph McGill	22	0.01%	
Write-in	All others	24	0.01%	
Turnout		363,763	100.00%	
Democratic hold		Swing		

== Bibliography ==
- Gubernatorial Elections, 1787-1997. Washington, D.C.: Congressional Quarterly Inc. 1998. ISBN 1-56802-396-0.
- Glashan, Roy R. (1979). American Governors and Gubernatorial Elections, 1775-1978. Meckler Books. ISBN 0-930466-17-9.
- Compiled by Mrs. J.E. Hays, State Historian and Director (1950). Georgia's Official Register, 1945-1950 (PDF). Atlanta, GA: State of Georgia, Department of Archives and History.
- Scammon, Richard M., ed. (1964). America Votes 5: a handbook of contemporary American election statistics, 1962. Pittsburgh, PA: Governmental Affairs Institute.
