= Three governors controversy =

Political crisis in the U.S. state of Georgia in 1946-47

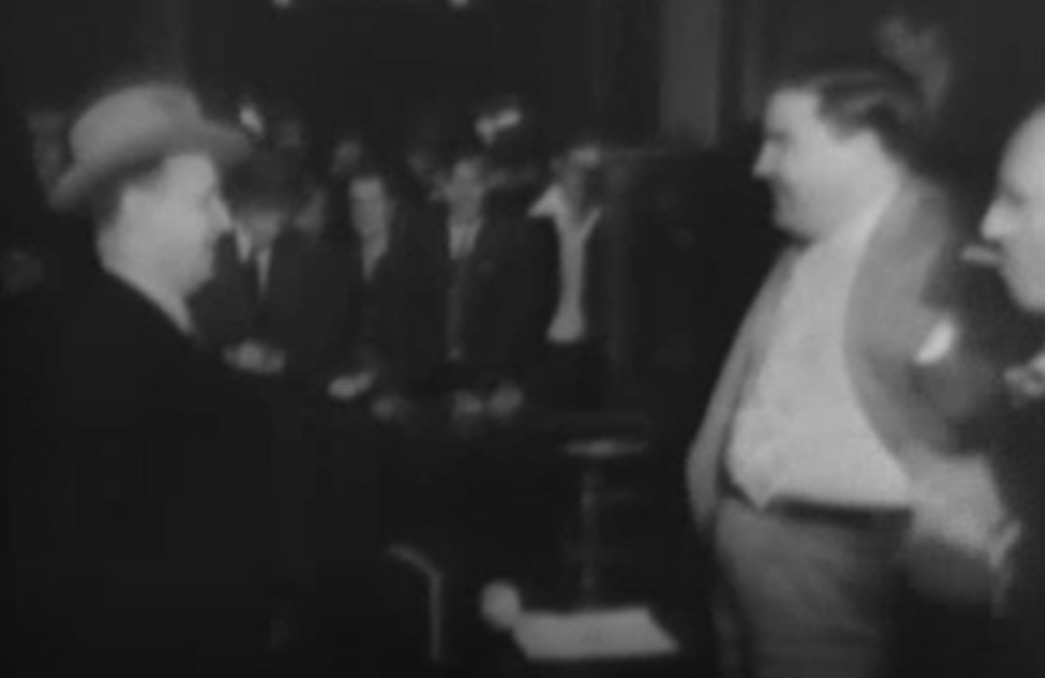
Ellis Arnall (left) being denied entry to the governor's Capitol office during the controversy

The three governors controversy was a constitutional crisis that occurred in the U.S. state of Georgia from 1946 to 1947.

Eugene Talmadge, the governor-elect of Georgia, died before taking office and the Constitution of Georgia did not specify an order of succession in such a situation. Three men made claims to the governorship: the outgoing governor, Ellis Arnall; the lieutenant governor-elect, Melvin E. Thompson; and Talmadge's son Herman Talmadge. Georgia's secretary of state, Benjamin W. Fortson Jr., hid the state seal in his wheelchair so no official business could be conducted until the controversy was settled. The Supreme Court of Georgia made a ruling which settled the matter in favor of Thompson four months later.

== Election ==
The 1945 Constitution of Georgia required a candidate receive a majority of votes to be elected Governor of Georgia; if no one had a majority, the General Assembly was to hold a contingent election between the top two candidates "who shall be in life, and shall not decline an election". Eugene Talmadge, who had previously served three terms as governor, ran in the Democratic primary despite his declining health. Talmadge became governor-elect when he narrowly defeated James V. Carmichael in the primary due to the unique county unit system in Georgia. When Talmadge's health issues became evident in the fall of 1946, his supporters believed this provision would require the General Assembly to choose between the second- and third-placed candidates in case of his death, and thus prepared by organizing enough write-in votes to ensure his son Herman Talmadge would take part. On December 21, 1946, Eugene Talmadge died after the general election but before his swearing-in, creating a succession crisis.

== Legislative action ==
The General Assembly met to certify the 1946 election on January 14, 1947. When the returns were first opened and counted, Republican write-in Talmadge Bowers was second, with Democratic primary challenger Carmichael third and Herman Talmadge fourth. However, after the first canvass, additional write-in votes were then discovered for Herman Talmadge from his home county of Telfair — probably the result of electoral fraud — and he ended up second in what became the official results.

After this, the General Assembly then declined to certify Eugene Talmadge as the winner, instead resolving that "no person had a majority of the whole number of votes" because of his death. It immediately proceeded to the contingent election between the top two living candidates. Carmichael declined to participate; Talmadge opponents voted "present" out of protest, and Talmadge won the contingent election 181–87.

Both Arnall and Thompson refused to accept the vote by the General Assembly. Thompson began legal proceedings, appealing to the Supreme Court of Georgia. Arnall physically refused to leave, so on January 15, 1947, both Talmadge and Arnall sat in the Georgia State Capitol claiming to be the governor. The next day, Talmadge took control of the governor's office and arranged to have the locks changed. On January 18, Arnall formally resigned any claim to the office in favor of Thompson.

Three governors controversy: 1946–1947
Claim	Claim	Claim
Herman Talmadge	Ellis Arnall	Melvin Thompson
Democratic	Democratic	Democratic
Claim: Elected by the General Assembly	Claim: Being the incumbent governor	Claim: Being the lieutenant governor
Outcome: Resigned	Outcome: Resigned	Outcome: Declared sole governor

== Judicial action ==
The state's highest court, the Supreme Court of Georgia, ruled March 19, 1947 that Eugene Talmadge's death did not change the fact that a majority of votes had been cast for him, and the General Assembly had violated the constitution by resolving there was no majority. It defined the General Assembly's role in certification as purely ministerial, and held that the constitution did not allow it any discretion in the process, including considering the death of a candidate.

Ironically, the court then resolved the initial controversy of who should have been governor after certification in favor of Ellis Arnall; since the constitution defined the gubernatorial term as four years but stipulated it does not expire until a successor is "chosen and qualified", and a dead person is not qualified, the court held Arnall should have continued serving as governor. However, he had voluntarily resigned any claim to the office to make way for Thompson. At that point, the court held, power devolved on the duly elected lieutenant governor.

Following the court's decision, Herman Talmadge ceded the office of governor to Thompson, ending the controversy. In any case of succession to the office of governor, the constitution required a special election to complete the gubernatorial term "at the next general election for members of the General Assembly", which was in November 1948.

Herman Talmadge then ran in the Democratic special primary, defeating Governor Thompson for the Democratic nomination with 51.8% of the votes to Thompson's 45.1%. Talmadge went on to win the general election with 97.51% of the vote. He served the final 26 months (November 1948 to January 1951) of the term for which his father had been elected, and was elected for a further full term in November 1950.

== See also ==
- List of governors of Georgia

== Sources ==
- Bullock, Charles S.; Buchanan, Scott E.; Gaddie, Ronald Keith (2015). The Three Governors Controversy: Skullduggery, Machinations, and the Decline of Georgia's Progressive Politics. Athens: University of Georgia Press. ISBN 978-0-8203-4734-9.
- Compiled by Mrs. J.E. Hays, State Historian and Director (1950). Georgia's Official Register, 1945-1950 (PDF). Atlanta, GA: State of Georgia, Department of Archives and History.
- Henderson, Harold Paulk (1991). The Politics of Change in Georgia: A Political Biography of Ellis Arnall. Athens: University of Georgia Press. ISBN 0-8203-1306-8.
- Novotny, Patrick (2007). This Georgia Rising: Education, Civil Rights, and the Politics of Change in Georgia in the 1940s. Macon, GA: Mercer University Press. ISBN 978-0-88146-088-9.
