= Statue of Eugene Talmadge =

Public monument in Atlanta, Georgia

Coordinates: 33°44′54″N 84°23′17″W

Eugene Talmadge statue
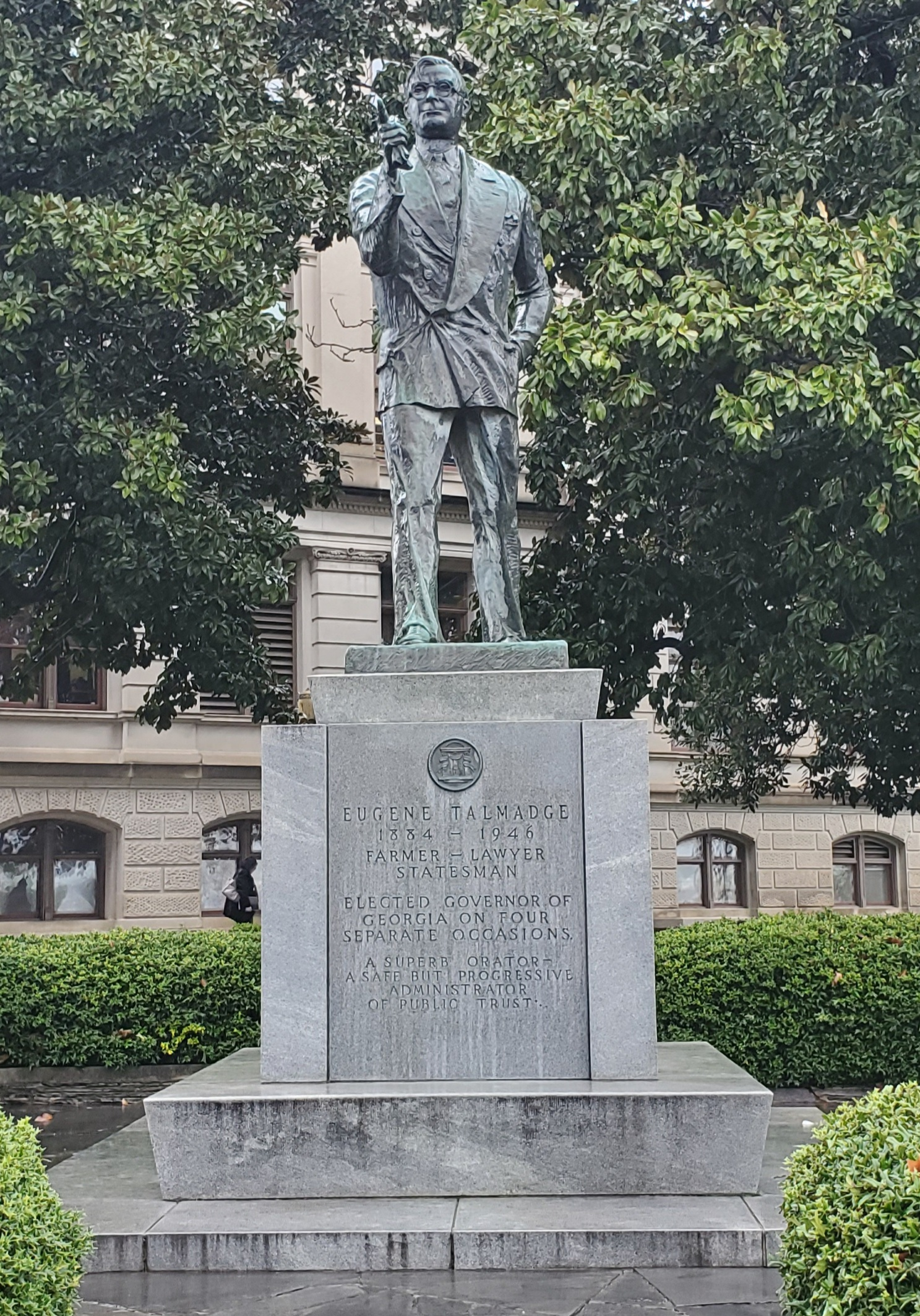
- Eugene Talmadge statue (2020)
- Location: Georgia State Capitol, Atlanta, Georgia
- Designer: Steffen Thomas
- Dedicated date: September 23, 1949
- Dedicated to: Eugene Talmadge

The Eugene Talmadge statue is a public monument located on the grounds of the Georgia State Capitol in Atlanta, Georgia. Designed by Steffen Thomas, the statue was unveiled in 1949 and depicts Georgia Governor Eugene Talmadge. The statue has been the subject of recent controversy given Talmadge's white supremacist and racist views.

== History ==
Born in 1884, Eugene Talmadge served multiple terms as Governor of Georgia during the 1930s and 1940s. We was first elected to that position in 1932 and in total was elected governor a total of four times. He died in 1946 after his fourth election before taking office. He is noted for several scandals that occurred both during and after his governorships, including the Cocking affair during his third term, the Moore's Ford lynchings during his campaign in the 1946 Georgia gubernatorial election, and the three governors controversy that occurred shortly after his death in 1946. Talmadge was also a segregationist, and during his 1946 campaign he made restoring the Georgia Democratic Party's white primary (which had recently been ruled unconstitutional by the Supreme Court of the United States) a key campaign issue.

In 1949, Eugene's son Herman Talmadge, who had briefly served as governor during the three governors controversy, pushed for the installation of a statue honoring his deceased father. Steffen Thomas sculpted the statue from his studio in nearby Stone Mountain, Georgia. While initially wanting to depict Talmadge with shirt sleeves and his thumbs hooked under his suspenders, the Talmadge family felt that that would be an "undignified" image of him. The statue was unveiled on the grounds of the Georgia State Capitol by his grandsons on September 23, 1949, on what would have been Eugene's 65th birthday. The statue's right hand features six fingers, an inconsistency from the real Talmadge.

Since the 2010s, Talmadge's reputation as governor has come under more scrutiny, with multiple publications criticizing the statue's placement at the Georgia State Capitol. Following the removal of a statue honoring Thomas E. Watson from the capitol grounds, publications including The Atlanta Journal-Constitution and the Washington Monthly criticized Talmadge and the statue, with the latter calling him a "reactionary demagogue" and the former calling him one of several racist figures honored on the capitol grounds, which included a statue of John Brown Gordon. Further criticism of the statue appeared following the Unite the Right rally in 2017.

== See also ==
- 1949 in art
