= 1934 Georgia gubernatorial election =

1934 Georgia Democratic gubernatorial primary
- September 12, 1934

410 county unit votes 206 unit votes needed to win
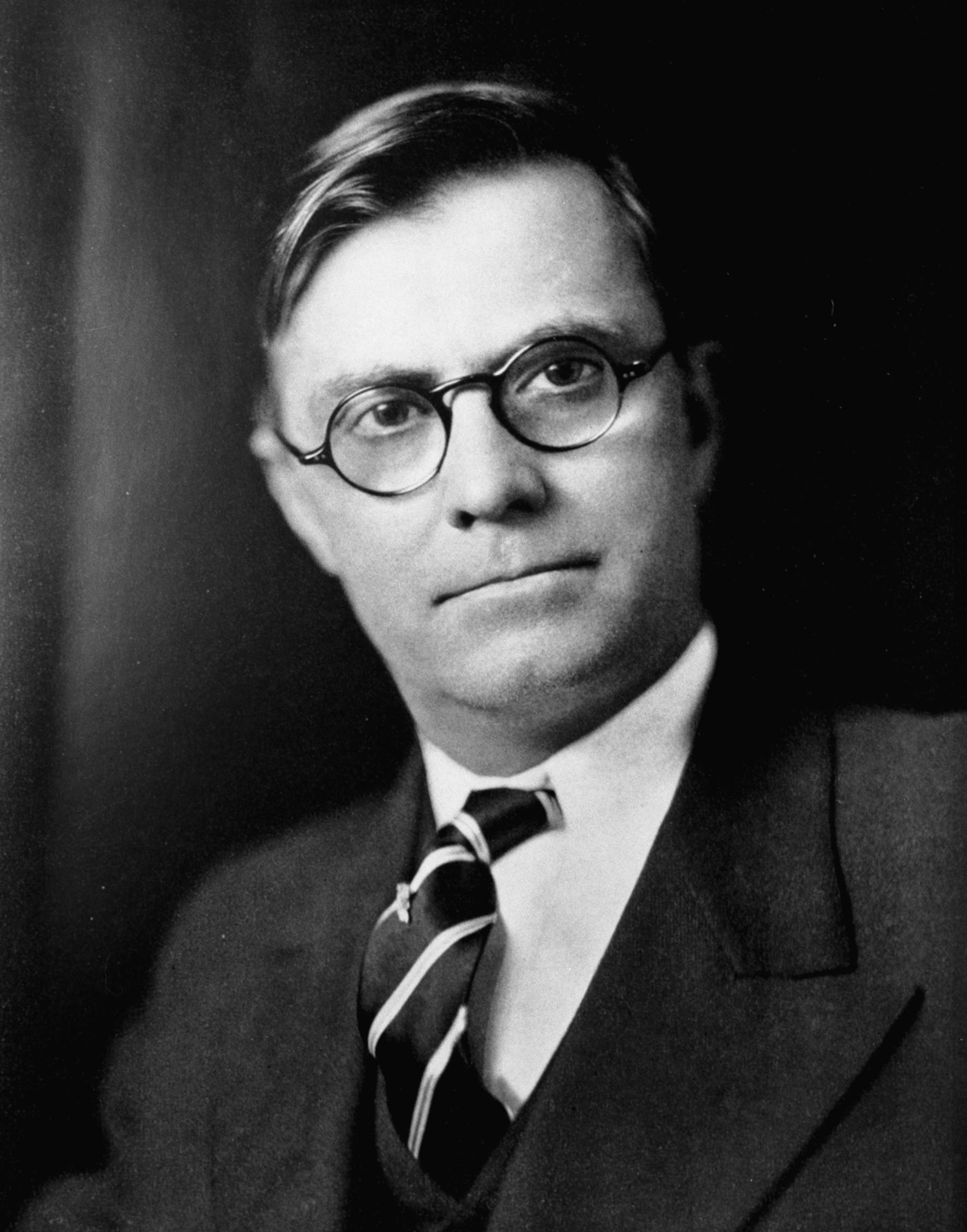

Nominee	Eugene Talmadge	Claude Pittman
Party	Democratic	Democratic
Electoral vote	394	16
Popular vote	178,409	87,049
Percentage	65.95%	32.18%
- County results Talmadge: 50–60% 60–70% 70–80% 80–90% >90% Pittman: 50–60%
Governor before election
Eugene Talmadge
Democratic
Elected Governor
Eugene Talmadge
Democratic

The 1934 Georgia gubernatorial election took place on November 6, 1934, in order to elect the governor of Georgia.

Incumbent Democratic governor Eugene Talmadge was re-elected to a second term.

As was common at the time, the Democratic candidate ran unopposed in the general election so therefore the Democratic primary was the real contest, and winning the primary was considered tantamount to election. It was the last gubernatorial election to go uncontested by a non-Democrat.

== Democratic primary ==
The Democratic primary election was held on September 12, 1934. As Talmadge won a majority of county unit votes, there was no run-off.

=== County unit system ===
From 1917 until 1962, the Democratic Party in the U.S. state of Georgia used a voting system called the county unit system to determine victors in statewide primary elections.

The system was ostensibly designed to function similarly to the Electoral College, but in practice the large ratio of unit votes for small, rural counties to unit votes for more populous urban areas provided outsized political influence to the smaller counties.

Under the county unit system, the 159 counties in Georgia were divided by population into three categories. The largest eight counties were classified as "Urban", the next-largest 30 counties were classified as "Town", and the remaining 121 counties were classified as "Rural". Urban counties were given 6 unit votes, Town counties were given 4 unit votes, and Rural counties were given 2 unit votes, for a total of 410 available unit votes. Each county's unit votes were awarded on a winner-take-all basis.

Candidates were required to obtain a majority of unit votes (not necessarily a majority of the popular vote), or 206 total unit votes, to win the election. If no candidate received a majority in the initial primary, a runoff election was held between the top two candidates to determine a winner.

=== Candidates ===
- Ed Gilliam, attorney and alderman of Atlanta
- Claude Pittman, Georgia Superior Court judge
- Eugene Talmadge, incumbent governor

=== Results ===
Candidate	Popular vote		County unit vote	
Candidate	Votes	%	Votes	%
Eugene Talmadge	178,409	65.95	394	96.10
Claude Pittman	87,049	32.18	16	3.90
Ed Gilliam	5,073	1.88		
Total	270,531	100.00	410	100.00

== General election ==
In the general election, Talmadge ran unopposed.

=== Results ===
1934 Georgia gubernatorial election
Party	Candidate	Votes	%	±%
Democratic	Eugene Talmadge (incumbent)	53,101	100.00%	
Turnout		53,101	100.00%	
Democratic hold		Swing		

== Bibliography ==
- Gubernatorial Elections, 1787-1997. Washington, D.C.: Congressional Quarterly Inc. 1998. ISBN 1-56802-396-0.
- Glashan, Roy R. (1979). American Governors and Gubernatorial Elections, 1775-1978. Meckler Books. ISBN 0-930466-17-9.
- Compiled by Mrs. J.E. Hays, State Historian and Director (1937). Georgia's Official Register, 1933-1935-1937 (PDF). Atlanta, GA: State of Georgia, Department of Archives and History.
