= The Statesman (Georgia) =

American weekly newspaper (1932–1956)

The Statesman was a weekly newspaper published in the U.S. state of Georgia in the period 1932–1956. It was founded by the white supremacist politician Eugene Talmadge in 1932. Originally published in Atlanta, Georgia, Its publication was moved to Hapeville, Georgia in 1938.

Talmadge used The Statesman to promote his political views. It printed editorials written by himself claiming that Franklin D. Roosevelt was compromising American sovereignty, making the allegation that the British prime minister Winston Churchill was being allowed to "meddle" in the affairs of Congress with Roosevelt's support. In the 1944 election, The Statesman ran a headline reading "Election of Roosevelt Means Promoting Negroes in Georgia".

His son Herman Talmadge took over publishing The Statesman after returning from World War II.

== Bibliography ==
- Anderson, William (1975). The Wild Man from Sugar Creek: The Political Career of Eugene Talmadge. Baton Rouge: Louisiana State University. ISBN 978-0807100882.
