= Harold Paulk Henderson =

American political scientist

Harold Paulk Henderson is a retired political science professor at Abraham Baldwin Agricultural College (ABAC) in Tifton, Georgia and an author. He wrote books on Georgia governors Ellis Arnall and Ernest Vandiver. Recordings of the interviews he conducted for the books have been collected by the Library of Congress in its Civil Rights Collection and in the University of Georgia's Richard B. Russell Library for Political Research and Studies along with eight VHS recordings from a symposium on Georgia governors he directed along with Gary L. Roberts at ABAC in 1985.

== Books ==
Henderson's books include:

- Ernest Vandiver, Governor of Georgia (2000)
- The Politics of Change in Georgia: A Political Biography of Ellis Arnall (1991)
- Georgia Governors in an Age of Change: From Ellis Arnall to George Busbee (edited with Gary L. Roberts, 1988)
