= Eugene Talmadge =

American politician (1884–1946)

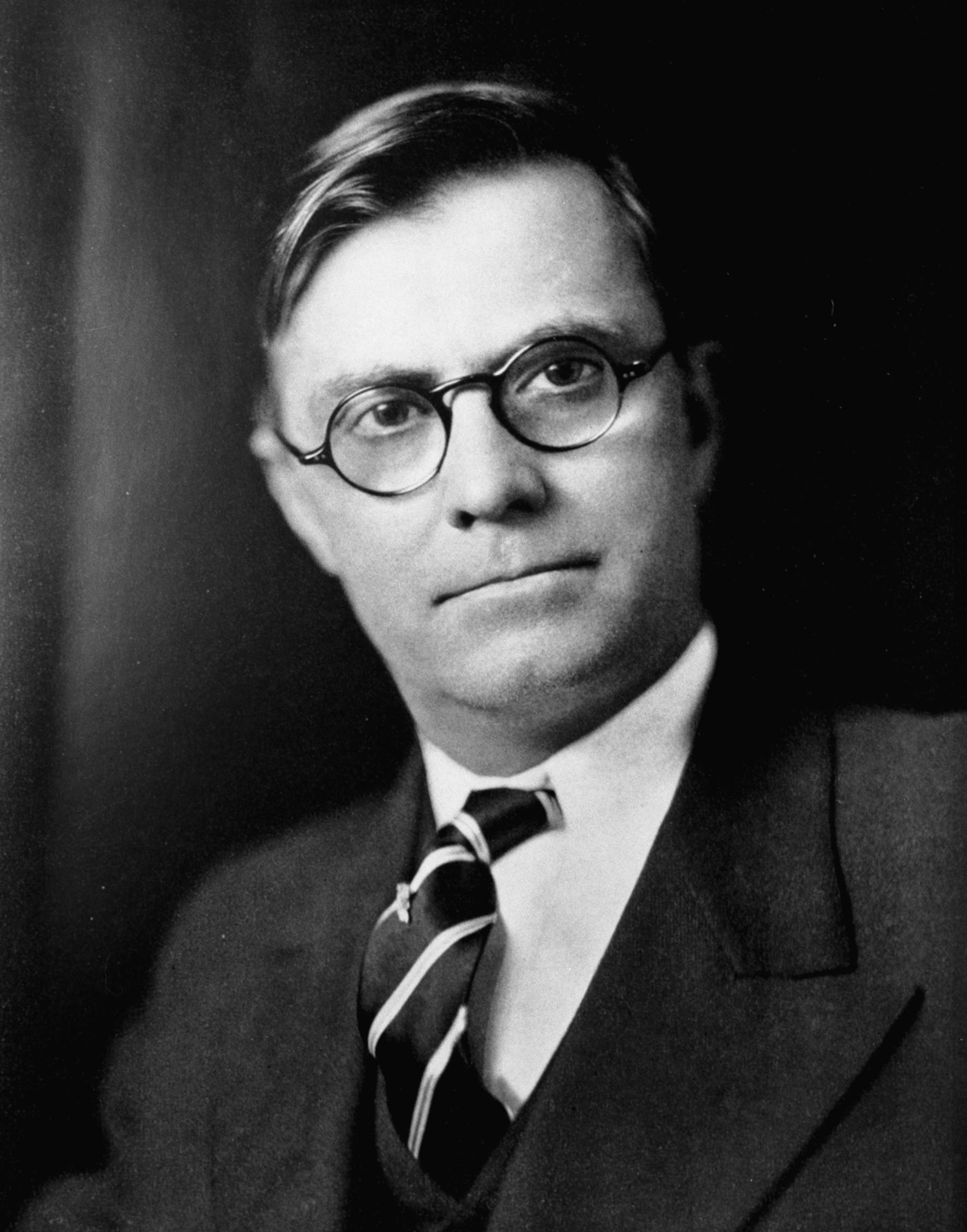
- Talmadge c. 1935

67th Governor of Georgia
- Died before assuming office
- Preceded by: Ellis Arnall
- Succeeded by: Melvin E. Thompson
- In office January 14, 1941 – January 12, 1943
- Preceded by: Eurith D. Rivers
- Succeeded by: Ellis Arnall
- In office January 10, 1933 – January 12, 1937
- Preceded by: Richard Russell Jr.
- Succeeded by: Eurith D. Rivers

Georgia Commissioner of Agriculture
- In office 1927–1933
- Governor: Lamartine G. Hardman; Richard Russell, Jr.
- Preceded by: J. J. Brown
- Succeeded by: G. C. Adams

Personal details
- Born: September 23, 1884 Forsyth, Georgia, U.S.
- Died: December 21, 1946 (aged 62) Atlanta, Georgia, U.S.
- Party: Democratic
- Spouse: Mattie Thurmond Peterson
- Children: 3, including Herman
- Education: University of Georgia (BA, LLB)

Eugene Talmadge (September 23, 1884 – December 21, 1946) was an American politician and attorney who served three terms as the 67th governor of Georgia, from 1933 to 1937, and then again from 1941 to 1943. Elected to a fourth term in November 1946, he died before his inauguration, scheduled for January 1947. Only Talmadge and Joe Brown, in the mid-19th century, have been elected four times as governor of Georgia.

A member of the Democratic Party, he was known for promoting racial segregation and white supremacy, and for advocating for racism in the University System of Georgia.

== Early life, education and early career ==
Eugene Talmadge was born on September 23, 1884, in Forsyth, Georgia, the second of two children to Thomas and Carrie (Roberts) Talmadge. He attended the University of Georgia and graduated from the university's law school in 1907. While at UGA, he was a member of the Phi Kappa Literary Society and Sigma Nu fraternity. In 1909, he married Mattie Thurmond Peterson and the couple had three children, including Herman Talmadge.

He started his legal career in Montgomery County where he also owned a farm. From 1918 to 1920, he started his political career as the solicitor for McRae, Georgia. He was the county attorney for Telfair County between 1920 and 1923. He joined the Democratic Party and twice ran for the Georgia state legislature, losing in 1920 and 1922.

=== Georgia Commissioner of Agriculture ===
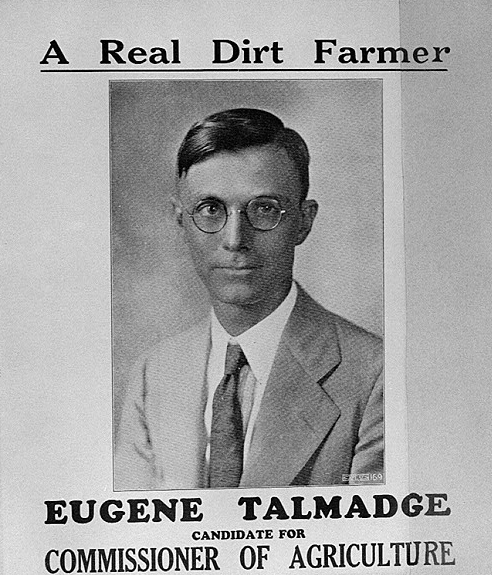
Poster from Talmadge's successful campaign for Georgia Commissioner of Agriculture, 1926

He was elected as the Georgia Commissioner of Agriculture in 1926, defeating J. J. Brown. Talmadge was re-elected commissioner in 1928 and 1930. As commissioner, Talmadge used the newspaper of his department to give advice to farmers and promote his political views, extolling the virtues of a laissez-faire economic policy and individual action to improve the well-being of farmers. He maintained widespread support among Georgia's rural white communities.

The State Senate concluded that Talmadge violated a state law requiring that fertilizer fees collected by the agriculture department be deposited in the state treasury. He was criticized for paying himself and family members more than $40,000 in salaries and expenses, and using department funds to make trips to the Kentucky Derby. Accused of "stealing" $20,000 in order to raise the price of hogs, Talmadge told one group of farmers, "Sure, I stole it! But I stole it for you." The State House declined requests to impeach Talmadge but agreed to sue him to recover state funds spent on the hog price manipulation scheme. When Governor Richard B. Russell Jr. referred the suit to the state attorney general, however, the request to sue Talmadge was rejected.

== Governor ==
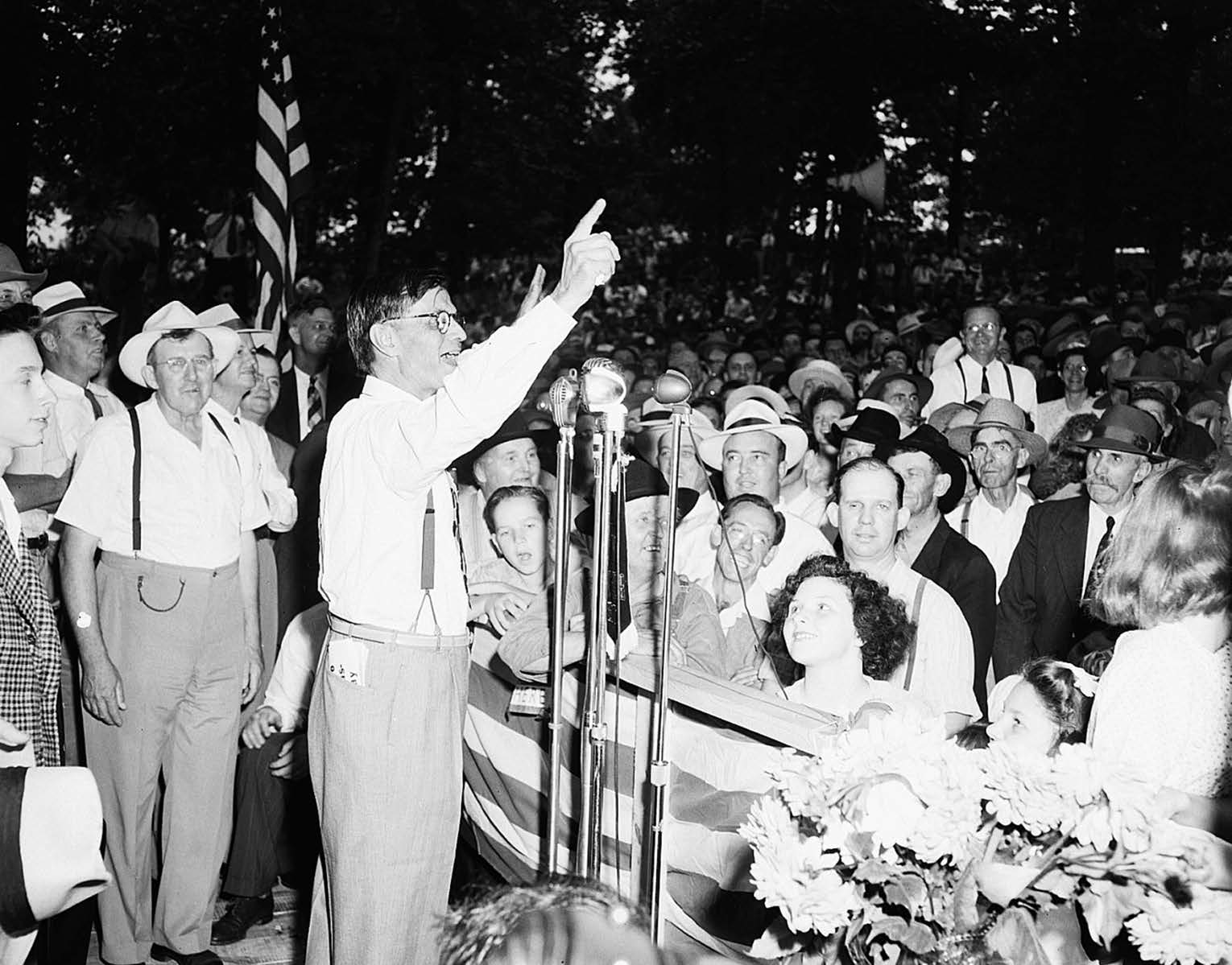
Talmadge giving a fiery speech to the working class during the 1932 gubernatorial elections.

In 1932, Governor Russell ran as a candidate for the United States Senate. Talmadge ran for governor, appealing to white rural Georgia by idealizing the small farmer, and preaching what he said were the true values of rural America, such as rugged individualism, frugality, governmental economy, segregation, limited government, and low taxes. Talmadge won a majority of the county unit votes and therefore the primary. Winning the nomination of the Democratic Party was tantamount to automatic victory in the general election. He was sworn in on January 10, 1933.

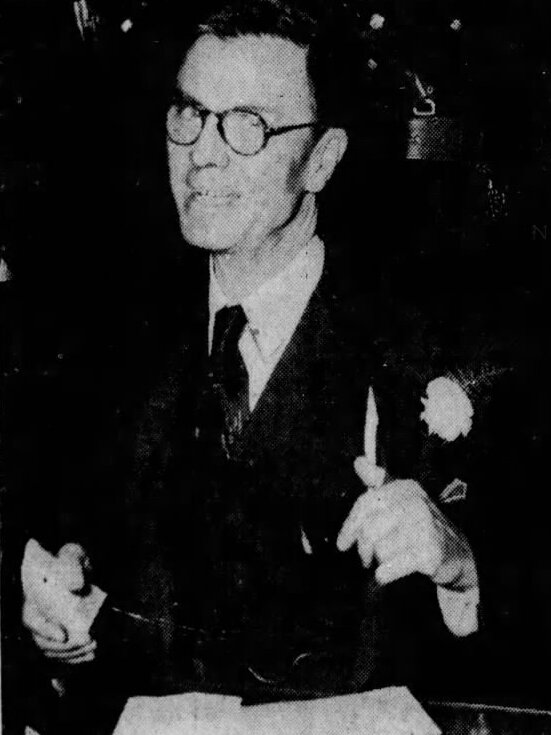
Talmadge c. 1940s

Because all counties were given equal weight, the County Unit System gave outsized power to the rural counties, which were Talmadge's base. He boasted, "I can carry any county that ain't got street cars." He made twelve campaign promises, the most controversial of which was to lower the price of an automobile license to $3, putting them within reach of the poorest farmers. The state legislature intensely debated the $3 license fee issue, but did not pass it. After it adjourned, Talmadge fixed the $3 fee by proclamation.

During the Great Depression of the 1930s, President Franklin D. Roosevelt developed the New Deal with programs to hire unemployed men to work on various public works projects. These were often for needed infrastructure identified by the states. In the South, these jobs offered higher wages than men could obtain in the private sector, and black men were paid the same rate as white men. Many of the wealthy white land-owning families in Georgia soon complained to Talmadge that their sharecroppers preferred to work on the better-paying New Deal public works projects rather than as sharecroppers, and asked the governor to intercede with the president.

In 1933, one sharecropper wrote to Talmadge: "I wound't [wouldn't] plow nobody's mule from sunrise to sunset for 50 cents a day when I could get $1.30 for pretending to work on a DITCH". A disgusted Talmadge forwarded the letter to Roosevelt, together with his own letter that stated: "I take it that you approve of paying farm labor 40 to 50 cents per day". Roosevelt wrote back: "Somehow I cannot get into my head that wages on such a scale make possible a reasonable American standard of living".

For all his populism and his self-image as the defender of the small white farmers of Georgia, Talmadge tended to side with the interests of the wealthier land-owning families of the state. He was strongly opposed to Roosevelt's efforts to raise wages in the South, believing that this would undercut the South's only economic advantage, namely of having the lowest wages in the United States. Roosevelt by contrast believed that raising wages would increase consumption and hence spur the economy out of the Great Depression.

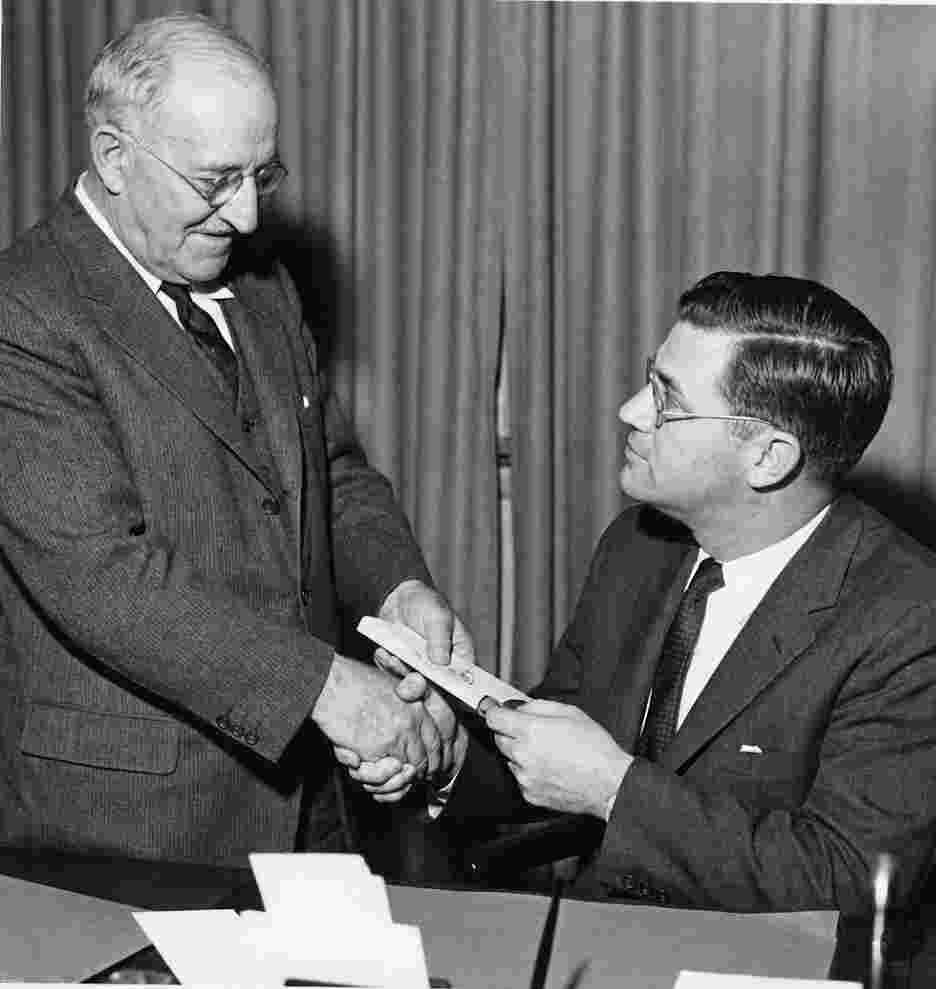
Talmadge (right) extends a 1933 New Year greeting to Jewish citizens through Frank Taffel (left). In a letter to the Jewish Morning Journal, Talmadge protested persecution of Jews by the German government.

When Georgia textile workers went on strike on September 1, 1934, Talmadge declared martial law during the third week of the strike. He directed four thousand National Guard troops to arrest all picketers throughout the state. He ordered the prisoners to be held behind the barbed wire of a former World War I prisoner of war camp for trial by a military tribunal. While the state interned about one hundred or so picketers, the show of force effectively ended picketing throughout most of the state. When Talmadge discovered that one of the employers had hired the notorious strikebreaker Pearl Bergoff, he had Bergoff and his two hundred men detained by the Georgia National Guard and deported to New York City.

Although often tied to both controversy and corruption, Talmadge was re-elected in 1934, carrying every county but three in the state's Democratic primary. When the Public Service Commission, a body elected by the voters, refused to lower utility rates, he appointed a new board to get it done. When the Highway Board resisted his efforts to control it, Talmadge declared martial law and appointed more cooperative members to the board. When the state treasurer and comptroller general refused to cooperate, the governor ordered state police to remove them physically from their offices in the state capitol. Critics denounced him as a dictator, a demagogue, and a threat to the tranquility of the state. His supporters considered him to be a friend of the "common man" and one of the state's most outstanding governors.

In October 1934, Talmadge ousted John S. Cohen, the pro-New Deal chairman of the Georgia Democratic Party, and replaced him with Hugh Howell, a Talmadge partisan. Roosevelt met with Talmadge to ask him to save Cohen's job, a request that was refused, leading the president to suspect that this was the first step by Talmadge toward a possible presidential run in 1936. By late 1934, Talmadge's relationship with Roosevelt was fraying. In December 1934, when Roosevelt decided to spend Christmas at Warm Springs, Georgia, Talmadge sent a note requesting a private meeting with the president. His staff responded by a note apologizing for Roosevelt not having the time to see the governor, and vaguely promising him a private meeting at the White House sometime in 1935.

By early 1935, Talmadge was working on an alliance with US Senator Huey Long (D-Louisiana), who was planning on running against Roosevelt in 1936. When asked what was discussed at his meetings with Long, Talmadge replied: "We both cussed Roosevelt". But, Long had a low opinion of Talmadge's intelligence, saying: "That Talmadge ain't got the brains to match his ambition". Beyond a shared antipathy to Roosevelt, the two had almost nothing in common politically. Long, a left-wing populist, had the slogan of "share the wealth", promising if elected president he would confiscate all the wealth of the richest Americans and redistribute it to the poor, whereas Talmadge was essentially an old-fashioned Southern conservative. Long criticized Roosevelt for not going far enough with the New Deal, while Talmadge had felt he had gone too far. Finally, both men wanted to run for president and wanted the other to serve as vice president, which proved to be the issue that ended their alliance and made them enemies.

Talmadge governed as a Southern conservative, vehemently attacking the nationalization of President Franklin D. Roosevelt and the New Deal. He objected to policies favorable to black people, the farm programs, and relief-work programs such as the Works Progress Administration and Civilian Conservation Corps. Talmadge believed the New Deal relief programs were encouraging people to be lazy, telling a reporter: "The way to handle a relief program was like how Mussolini was handling it in Italy, namely to line these people up and take the troops and make them work".

Talmadge tried to build a region-wide coalition, making a national speaking tour in preparation for a challenge to FDR in 1936. Talmadge's main allies were the Reverend Gerald L. K. Smith, who had been the principal organizer of Long's Share Our Wealth Clubs; John Henry Kirby, a wealthy Texas businessman who had been a leading Long supporter; and novelist Thomas Dixon Jr., a white supremacist whose books glorifying the Ku Klux Klan were very popular at the time. Talmadge's bid was being financed with some $41,000 contributed by Alfred Sloan, CEO of General Motors, together with money from the Raskob and du Pont families.

His Southern Committee to Uphold the Constitution organized a convention in Macon, Georgia, in January 1936 that brought together fragments of the old Huey P. Long coalition. The Macon convention turned out to be a media disaster that ended Talmadge's presidential hopes. The populist platform that Talmadge drafted at his Macon convention, with its call for more silver to be mined to support the silver standard, more protectionism, more states rights, more isolationism, and less immigration was widely mocked as more appropriate for the 19th century than the 20th.

Talmadge pledged to defend the "sovereignty of our states and local self-government" at the upcoming Democratic National Convention. However, Roosevelt, who visited Warm Springs, Georgia, often because of his past polio, was more popular with the poor farmers. Unable to run for re-election in 1936, Talmadge chose to challenge Senator Russell in the primary, but Russell defeated Talmadge by a landslide and Talmadge's presidential hopes collapsed. Talmadge's handpicked candidate for governor, Charles Redwine, lost the 1936 Georgia gubernatorial election to pro-New Deal Democrat Eurith D. Rivers by an overwhelming margin.

In 1936, according to a United Press (UP) article printed in the Atlanta Constitution on August 21, 1936, titled "Gene Selects Hitler as Favorite 'Author'", Talmadge reportedly told a Los Angeles newspaper that while he didn't have time to read many books, he read Adolf Hitler's book Mein Kampf ("My Struggle") seven times. The Nazi publication Die Bewegung reprinted the interview with Talmadge and praised him, stating that "Governor Eugene Talmadge, of Georgia, is obviously a very intelligent man."

In 1938, Talmadge challenged incumbent U.S. senator Walter F. George. Though George had sided with 34 of Roosevelt's 44 New Deal proposals, he refused to support some of the proposals in Roosevelt's second term. The president believed George had been "put out to pasture". Roosevelt tried to purge George and campaigned for his own candidate, Lawrence Camp. George, however, refused to criticize Roosevelt during the campaign and blamed the purge on Roosevelt's advisers. Despite the divide among the New Deal vote, George easily won renomination, securing 141,922 popular votes and a majority of 246 county unit votes, while Talmadge won just 102,464 popular votes and 148 unit votes. Talmadge's margin over Roosevelt's candidate Camp, who secured just 78,223 popular votes and 16 unit votes, surprised his critics.

== University of Georgia ==
Talmadge was elected again as governor in 1940 and returned to the governor's office in 1941, emerging as the leader of racist and segregationist elements in Georgia. Responding to reports that Walter Cocking, a dean at the University of Georgia, had advocated bringing black and white students together in the classroom, Talmadge launched an attack on the university, charging elitism, and called for the regents to remove Cocking and purge the university of communists, "foreigners" (non-Georgians), and subscribers to racial equality. The university board of regents at first refused Talmadge's demands, but after the governor restructured the board, the university dismissed numerous staff.

This intervention into academic affairs caused the Southern Association of Colleges and Schools to remove accreditation from the Georgia state universities. It also contributed to Talmadge's defeat by Ellis Arnall in 1942.

In 1940–1941, Talmadge took a strongly isolationist line and was opposed to Roosevelt's policy of having America be the "arsenal of democracy". He said that money spent in aiding Britain, China and the Soviet Union would have been better spent on helping the poor farmers of Georgia. The fact that Talmadge had an admiration for Hitler and voiced such strong support for Japan's war against China that the Japanese government invited him to visit Japan on all-expenses paid vacation (an offer he declined) led to allegations that he was an Axis-sympathizer. Some commentators felt that Talmadge was merely naive, a man who knew nothing about the affairs of Europe and Asia, while others charged that his authoritarian style of leadership made him naturally sympathetic towards fascist regimes. About the charge that he acted like a dictator, Talmadge replied: "I'm what you call a minor dictator. But did you ever see anybody that was much good who didn't have a little dictator in him?" Talmadge's biographer, William Anderson, wrote that Talmadge's admiration for Nazi Germany, his tendency to surround himself with paramilitary followers, and his frequent calls for martial law gave "an eerie backing" for his words.

At the same time, the Cocking Affair had badly damaged Talmadge's reputation. Arnall was a supporter of segregation, whose views on race were essentially the same as Talmadge's, but he presented himself as a supporter of better education for Georgians. Arnall noted that nobody could beat Talmadge in what he cynically called the "nigger-hating contest", and argued that the issue in the "Cocking Affair" was not white supremacy, as Talmadge claimed, but education. Arnall charged that Georgia's universities losing their accreditation, which Talmadge presented as an achievement on his part, put at risk the futures of all the students attending the universities. At a time when most Georgians were living in poverty and few attended higher education, the possibility that those young people who were lucky enough to attend university or might be would lose their chances to escape lives of poverty was widely regarded as unacceptable. Those Georgians whose children were attending the university were outraged that the futures of their children had been at risk, and those whose children were not attending university had hopes that someday they might.

The students at Georgia's universities and colleges campaigned vigorously against Talmadge, putting on skits that mocked the governor as a power-crazed buffoon just before football games. They were disproportionately over-represented as volunteers in the Arnall campaign. When Talmadge held campaign rallies, students showed up to chant "To Hell with Talmadge!" At one Talmadge campaign rally on July 2, 1942, a Talmadge supporter threw a canister of tear gas at the students, an incident that attracted much negative comment and led to demands that Talmadge discipline his "hoodlums" who always patrolled his rallies. Talmadge was so unpopular with students that his campaign workers in the university town of Athens urged him not to hold a campaign rally there, predicting that more people would come out to boo him than cheer him.

Realizing that Arnall had cast himself as stronger on the education issue, Talmadge changed tactics and announced simply that the loss of accreditation to Georgia's universities did not matter, saying at one rally in a rural area: "They talk about education. It ain't never taught a man how to plant cotton. It ain't made a garden bloom. It ain't never taught the experience necessary to raise cows and chickens. You gotta git out and do them things, and no school education is going to help ya". This message was intended to appeal to the white farmers who traditionally supported Talmadge, but may have inadvertently hurt him as even many of Talmadge's rural supporters knew that a better education represented their children's best hope of escaping poverty, and did not appreciate the implied message that the best thing that could happen to their children would be to follow their parents in lives of drudgery and poverty.

As was always the case, Talmadge presented himself as an aggressive defender of white supremacy, arguing that keeping the black people disfranchised and segregated was far more important than education, a message that appealed to his core supporters, but to nobody else. At one campaign rally, Talmadge stated: "We in the South love the Negro in his place-but his place is at the back door". The fact that Arnall had also declared himself a supporter of segregation, albeit not in quite the same crude terms as Talmadge had, meant that for many white Georgians there was no difference between the candidates on "the Negro question", and therefore neutralized Talmadge's advantage as a defender of white supremacy. Furthermore, men were more likely to vote for Talmadge than women, and in 1942, many Georgian men were serving in the military, thus leading to women being over-represented in the Democratic primary. In the primary, Arnall won 174,575 votes to Talmadge's 128,394. Even the "county unit system", which worked to Talmadge's advantage in the past, failed to save him in 1942. Arnall won 242 unit votes to Talmadge's 149.

== In retirement ==
Just after Talmadge left office in January 1943, it emerged that since 1940 he had been receiving food grown on the state prison farms for free, an allegation that he admitted to, saying he was saving the state of Georgia money by not paying for his food. Shortly afterwards, it emerged that he attended a meeting of the Ku Klux Klan, which he again admitted to, saying that "everyone had a good time" at the Klan banquet. In his retirement, Talmadge grew increasingly bitter and became consumed with a violent hatred for Roosevelt. The isolationist Talmadge also deplored the United States fighting in World War II, all the more so as the social changes caused by the war were threatening Talmadge's vision of what an ideal America should be. In particular, the first tentative gains made by the Civil rights movement in the war years enraged Talmadge, who predicated that even the modest gains being made by black Americans during the war would eventually lead to the end of white supremacy in the South.

Talmadge convinced himself that Roosevelt had deliberately engineered the United States's entry into World War II because he wanted to create the social changes that would end white supremacy, causing him to engage in long tirades against Roosevelt, the New Deal, World War II and black Americans. Talmadge's newspaper, The Statesman printed editorials written by himself claiming that Roosevelt was compromising American sovereignty, making the allegation that the British prime minister Winston Churchill was being allowed to "meddle" in the affairs of Congress with Roosevelt's support. In the 1944 election, The Statesman ran a headline reading "Election of Roosevelt Means Promoting Negroes in Georgia". Anderson wrote during the war Talmadge became a "total cultural isolationist", a man who saw the world outside of the United States as a dangerous, menacing place and believed increasing American involvement with the world beyond would destroy everything that he held sacred. At the same time, Talmadge, always a heavy drinker, started to drink on a scale that began to seriously damage his health.

Anderson described Talmadge as "a ghost's voice hellbent on halting the future. But it was a frightened voice, scared that the wave of history had at last washed over the impenetrable culture of his fathers. So easily had his people succumbed to the siren call of change that Gene found himself with one hoary root left, one last undeniable link to yesterday-the black. He alone anchored the old consciousness, the tenacious culture, the old consciousness. Gene Talmadge knew if this one tie was uprooted, his world would be gone forever." When the U.S. Supreme Court ruled in the 1944 Smith v. Allwright decision that white-only primaries were illegal and ordered Southern states to hold color-blind primaries, Talmadge was enraged; his attempted political comeback was based entirely on a virulently racist platform of upholding white supremacy.

== Last election ==
During Arnall's term, the state legislature lengthened his term to four years and prohibited him from seeking re-election in 1946. Talmadge ran for governor and used the Smith v. Allwright decision, ruling that the closed white primary was unconstitutional, as his main red flag issue. Talmadge promised that if he were to be elected, he would restore the "Equal Primary". Talmadge's family and advisers sought to persuade him not to run, warning that due to his failing health that a grueling campaign might kill him, but he refused to step aside in favor of his son Herman who had been groomed as his heir, saying "Naw, I'm the only goddamn son of a bitch who can win". Talmadge's campaign was noted for its violent racist rhetoric as he boasted about assaulting and flogging the black sharecroppers who worked for his family as a young man and he claimed to have chased a black man down the street with an ax because he sat next to a white woman. His 1946 campaign is described by historians as explicitly white supremacist.

In June 2007, previously sealed FBI files revealed that Talmadge was investigated by the FBI over suspicions he sanctioned the Moore's Ford lynching. Though Talmadge was unpopular in the more populous urban areas, his relative popularity in rural areas gave him a fighting chance of still winning the Democratic nomination under the "county unit votes" system in which (essentially) the candidate who won the most counties, not the most popular votes, would receive the nomination. Even then, Talmadge's opponent, James V. Carmichael, still polled well in rural counties, though not as well as in urban counties. Several witnesses stated that they overheard Talmadge speaking to George Hester, the brother of a white man stabbed by a black man named Roger Malcolm, outside of the courthouse in Monroe, Georgia, promising he would "take care of the Negro" in exchange for the Hester family using their influence to help win Walton County. On July 25, 1946, the car carrying Malcolm, who had been bailed out of jail, was stopped by a group of about 30 white men at Moore's Ford. Malcolm, his wife Dorothy, and the other black couple riding in the car, George and Mae Murray Dorsey, were marched out of the car, lined up and shot. The FBI agent investigating the lynching called the allegation that Talmadge led the lynch mob "unbelievable", but he forwarded the allegation to FBI director J. Edgar Hoover "as it may be of some possible future interest." Talmadge's grandson, Herman Talmadge Jr, told the press: "I don't think my grandfather's involved in any lynching. If y'all are that far off, I feel sorry for you." About the allegations that it was Talmadge who led the lynch mob at Moore's Ford, the historian Robert Pratt stated: "I'm not surprised ... historians over the years have concluded the violently racist tone of his 1946 campaign may have been indirectly responsible for the violence that came at Moore's Ford. It's fair to say he's one of the most virulently racist governors the state has ever had." In 1946, Talmadge won Walton County by only 200 votes.

Talmadge lost the popular vote in the 1946 Democratic primary to James V. Carmichael but won a majority of the "county unit votes". He died in December, before he could be sworn in for his fourth term. The cause of death was hepatitis complicated with the effects of liver cirrhosis caused by his heavy drinking. Talmadge's coffin, while lying in state at the Georgia capital, was decorated with a wreath reading KKKK (Knights of the Ku Klux Klan), an organization that Talmadge had at least been friendly with. His death right before his inauguration precipitated the 1947 "three governors controversy" among Arnall, newly elected lieutenant governor Melvin E. Thompson, and Talmadge's son, Herman Talmadge. While the General Assembly elected Herman Talmadge to take his father's place, Thompson claimed his right to succeed to the governorship, and also Arnall refused to leave office. Following a decision by the Supreme Court of Georgia, Herman Talmadge ceded the office of governor to Thompson, ending the controversy—which had damaged Georgia's national reputation.

== Awards and legacy ==
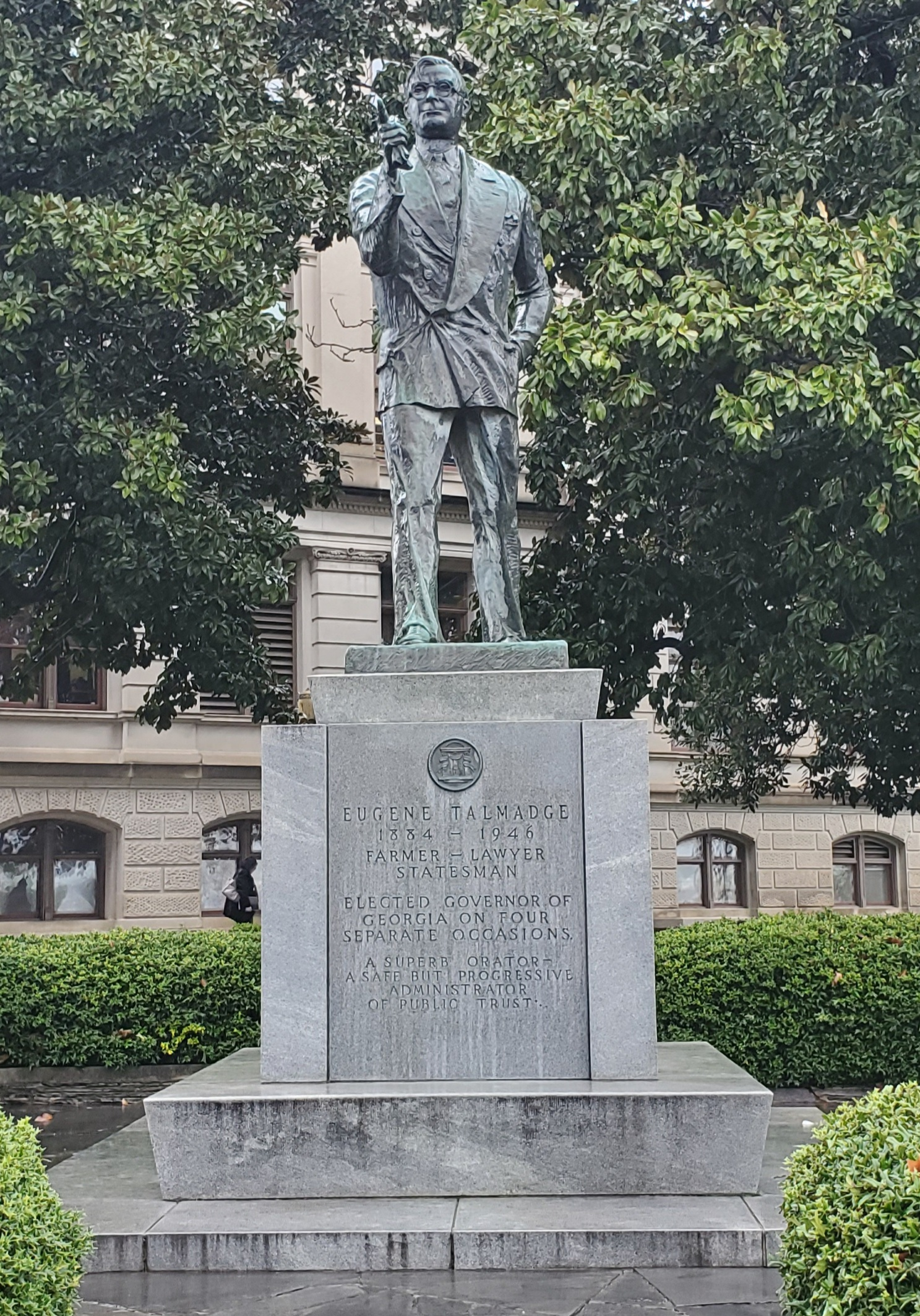
Statue of Eugene Talmadge on the grounds of the Georgia State Capitol

- In 1941, Talmadge received an honorary degree in Doctor of Laws from Oglethorpe University.
- In 1949, a statue honoring Talmadge was unveiled on the grounds of the Georgia State Capitol.
- The Talmadge Memorial Bridge (1953/1991) in Savannah, Georgia, is named after him. It connects downtown Savannah, Georgia with the Carolina Low Country via the Savannah River. In the early 21st century, renaming of the bridge has been suggested because of Talmadge's history as a white supremacist.

=== Representation in popular culture ===
- The "Cocking affair" was the subject of Michael Braz's opera, A Scholar Under Siege, composed for the centenary of Georgia Southern University and premiered in 2007.
- The Podcast, "Behind the Bastards", released a 4-part series on Talmadge called, "America's First Fascist Governor" on October 8, 2024.

== See also ==
- List of governors of Georgia

== Bibliography ==
- Anderson, William (1975). The Wild Man from Sugar Creek: The Political Career of Eugene Talmadge. Baton Rouge: Louisiana State University. ISBN 978-0807100882.
- Kennedy, David (2005). Freedom From Fear The American People in Depression and War, 1929–1945. Oxford: Oxford University Press. ISBN 0195144031.
- Wexler, Laura (2013). Fire in a Canebrake: The Last Mass Lynching in America. New York: Scribner. ISBN 978-0684868165.

Further reading

- Bailes, Sue. "Eugene Talmadge and the Board of Regents Controversy." Georgia Historical Quarterly 53.4 (1969): 409–423. online
- Cobb, James C. "Not Gone, But Forgotten: Eugene Talmadge and the 1938 Purge Campaign." Georgia Historical Quarterly 59.2 (1975): 197–209. online
- Cook, James F. "The Eugene Talmadage–Walter Cocking Controversy." Phylon 35.2 (1974): 181–192. online
- Galloway, Tammy Harden. " 'Tribune of the Masses and a Champion of the People': Eugene Talmadge and the Three-Dollar Tag." Georgia Historical Quarterly 79.3 (1995): 673–684. online
- Gibson, Chester. "Eugene Talmadge's use of identification during the 1934 gubernatorial campaign in Georgia." Southern Journal of Communication 35.4 (1970): 342–349. online
- Jarman, Rufus (1942). "Wool-Hat Dictator". Saturday Evening Post. 214 (52): 20.
- Lemmon, Sarah McCulloh. "The Ideology of Eugene Talmadge." Georgia Historical Quarterly 38.3 (1954): 226–248. online
- Lemmon, Sarah McCulloh. "The Agricultural Policies of Eugene Talmadge." Agricultural History 28.1 (1954): 21–30. online
- Lesseig, Corey T. "Talmadge, Eugene" in American National Biography Online (2000)
- Logue, Cal McLeod. Eugene Talmadge: rhetoric and response (Greenwood, 1989).
- Luthin, Reinhard H. (1954). "Ch. 8: Eugene Talmadge: 'The Wild Man' of Sugar Creek, Georgia". American Demagogues: Twentieth Century. Beacon Press. pp. 182–207. ASIN B0007DN37C. LCCN 54-8428. OCLC 1098334.
- Mead, Howard N. "Russell vs. Talmadge: Southern Politics and the New Deal." Georgia Historical Quarterly 65.1 (1981): 28–45. online

Party political offices
Preceded by Richard Russell Jr.	Democratic nominee for Governor of Georgia; 1932, 1934	Succeeded by Eurith D. Rivers
Preceded by Eurith D. Rivers	Democratic nominee for Governor of Georgia; 1940	Succeeded by Ellis Arnall
Preceded by Ellis Arnall	Democratic nominee for Governor of Georgia; 1946	Succeeded by Herman Talmadge
Political offices
Preceded by Richard Russell Jr.	Governor of Georgia; 1933–1937	Succeeded by Eurith D. Rivers
Preceded by Eurith D. Rivers	Governor of Georgia; 1941–1943	Succeeded by Ellis Arnall
Preceded by Ellis Arnall	Governor-elect of Georgia; 1946	Succeeded by Herman Talmadge
