= James V. Carmichael =

American attorney, business executive and politician

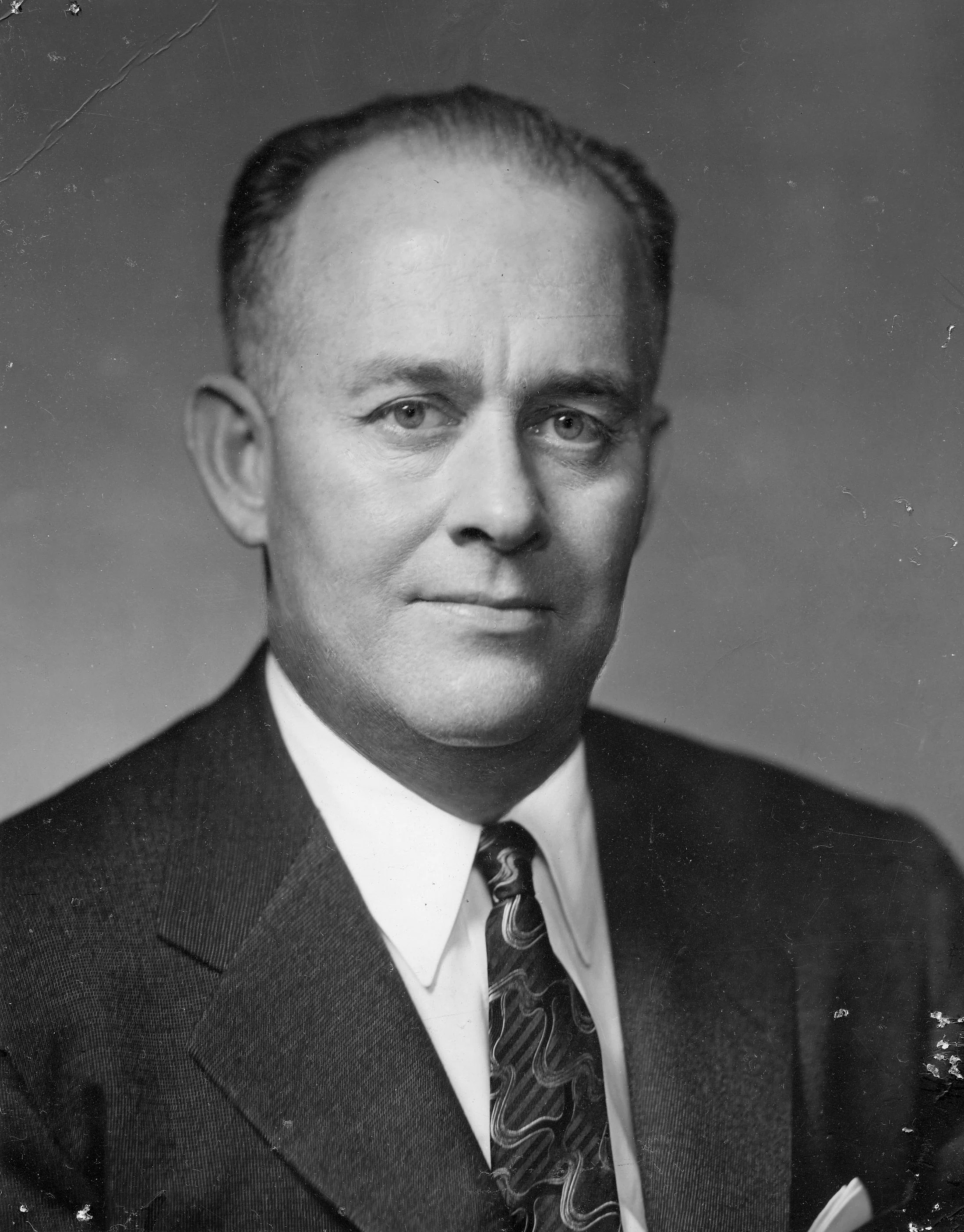
Carmichael c. 1957

James Vinson Carmichael (October 2, 1910 – November 28, 1972) was a member of the Georgia General Assembly, an attorney, business executive, and candidate for Governor of Georgia.

== Early life ==
Carmichael was born, in Cobb County, Georgia to parents Emma Mae Nolan and John Vinson Carmichael. His parents owned a country store outside of Smyrna. Just before he turned sixteen, his spinal cord was almost completely severed when he ran out in front of a car. He was able to return to Marietta High School, after a year of medical care, but still in a wheelchair. He re-learned how to walk but could only do so for short distances with a cane. He endured intense pain for the rest of his life.

Overcoming his disability, Carmichael graduated in 1933 from the Emory University School of Law. While attending Emory he was a member of Sigma Pi fraternity and Delta Theta Phi law fraternity.

After receiving his law degree, he partnered with Mayor Leon M. "Rip" Blair in Marietta to form a practice. In 1938 he married Frances Elizabeth McDonald, and had three children: Mary Emma, James Jr., and Frances Elizabeth.

== Legislature and public service ==
Carmichael was elected to two terms as a Georgia legislator (1935–1940) without opposition. Carmichael served in the Georgia House of Representatives. He decided not to seek a third term when his law firm took on a major client that did business with the state to avoid potential conflicts of interest.

In 1943, Governor Ellis Arnall appointed him as executive director of the Georgia Department of Revenue and later placed him on the committee that wrote the 1945 Georgia Constitution.

Carmichael also served as one of Georgia's delegates to the 1952 Democratic National Convention.

== Business leadership and World War II ==
As Cobb County attorney, Carmichael teamed with Mayor Blair and Commissioner George McMillan to build an airport in 1941, called Rickenbacker Field (later part of Dobbins Air Reserve Base). When Pearl Harbor was attacked, the group was able to bring a base of the United States Army Air Corps to the site, and a branch of the Bell Aircraft Corporation. Carmichael was named attorney for Bell's Georgia division and in November 1944, he was promoted to general manager of the 28,000-employee plant, which had become known as United States Air Force Plant 6. When the war ended Bell had sold the military some 663 B-29 Superfortresses on schedule and without a single crash.

== 1946 gubernatorial election ==
When the war ended the government cancelled its B-29 contract and Marietta's Bell plant closed. Gov. Arnall encouraged Carmichael to run against two former governors in the 1946 Democratic primary, Eugene Talmadge and Eurith D. Rivers.

Carmichael was not as liberal as Arnall but far more so than Talmadge or Rivers. He was skeptical of the New Deal labor and welfare programs but represented a progressive business philosophy that championed moderation in race relations, improved public schools and roads, and attracted major companies to Georgia.

Carmichael won the popular vote 313,389 to Talmadge's 297,245, however, because of a unique Georgia law known as the "county unit system" he lost the election. The rule favored rural Georgia over metropolitan areas in a take on the electoral college system, thus making Talmadge the winner of the Democratic primary.

== Post World War II ==
With the closing of the Bell plant Carmichael became a partner in several local industrial ventures. In 1947, he assumed the presidency of the Scripto pen company in downtown Atlanta. Under his leadership it expanded overseas and became the largest manufacturer of writing instruments in the world.

== Korean War ==
At the start of the war, the U.S. Air Force chose the Lockheed Corporation to reopen Marietta's assembly plant. Lockheed took advantage of Carmichael's expertise and asked him to serve as general manager with the assistance of senior Lockheed executive, Daniel J. Haughton. He ran the Georgia division from 1951 to 1953, supervising the refurbishing of 120 B-29s and the start of the B-47 Stratojet project. He then turned the division over to Haughton and returned to Scripto. However, he remained on Lockheed's board of directors until 1972.

== Later life ==
Carmichael was courted by Robert W. Woodruff to take the presidency of The Coca-Cola Company in the early 1950s, but the pain from his back injury wouldn't allow it.

Carmichael always championed the need for a two-party system in politics whether this meant "Democrats and Republicans [or] Democrats and Loyal Democrats." In mid-century Georgia this statement risked political suicide to a politician with statewide aspirations. However, in 1960, he introduced Richard Nixon at his campaign event in Atlanta.

His management philosophies was the subject of a story in the journal Management Methods in September 1958. He remained president at Scripto until 1964, when he was forced out by falling profits and a strike by the International Chemical Workers Union.

In 1964, he was the first president of the Atlanta Arts Alliance and a trustee of Emory University and Atlanta University. He was on the boards of the Interdenominational Theological Center, the Atlanta School of Art, and the University System of Georgia, and a governor in the Kiwanis International. He was also on the board of directors for the Trust Company of Georgia, the Southern Company, and Georgia International Life Insurance. That same year he was a speaker at Vanderbilt University's IMPACT symposium.

In 1965, he was awarded the Georgia Medal for Distinguished Service.

He died in Marietta at age sixty-two, on November 28, 1972.

The Carmichael Student Center at Kennesaw State University is named for him.
