= Constitution of Georgia (U.S. state) =

American state constitution

Constitution of the State of Georgia

Overview
- Jurisdiction: Georgia, United States
- Created: September 25, 1981
- Ratified: November 2, 1982
- Date effective: July 1, 1983; 43 years ago
- Chambers: Two (bicameral Georgia General Assembly)
- Executive: Governor of Georgia
- Location: Georgia Archives

The Constitution of the State of Georgia is the governing document of the U.S. state of Georgia. The constitution outlines the three branches of government in Georgia. The legislative branch is embodied in the bicameral General Assembly. The executive branch is headed by the governor. The judicial branch is headed by the Supreme Court. Besides providing for the organization of these branches, the Constitution carefully outlines which powers each branch may exercise.

The current and tenth Georgia State Constitution was ratified on November 2, 1982, replacing the previous 1976 constitution.

Amendments to the Constitution may be proposed in the Georgia legislature and must be approved by a two-thirds majority vote of both the state House and state Senate followed by ratification by a majority of the electors qualified to vote for members of the General Assembly at the next general election which is held in the even-numbered years. The Constitution can also be amended by proposal at a constitutional convention, the calling of which must receive the support of a two-thirds majority vote by both houses of the legislature and a simple majority of state voters.

== History ==
Georgia has had ten different constitutions in its history, not counting its royal charter, granted in 1732. The charter, approved by George II of Great Britain (the colony's namesake), placed Georgia under the control of Trustees, led by James Oglethorpe. The Trustees governed Georgia until 1752, when they surrendered their charter. Georgia then became a crown colony.

=== Antebellum constitutions (1776, 1777, 1789, 1798, and 1861) ===
Prior to having a formal constitution, a document entitled Rules and Regulations of the Colony of Georgia, drafted in 1776, was in effect. This document was designed to be temporary and made the Provincial Congress the most powerful branch of government. A year later, in 1777, the first formal constitution was drafted. This document also made the legislature the most powerful branch, with the governor being forced to rely on his executive council for many decisions. The executive council was composed of 12 members composed of the legislators that were voted in by the legislators of the House of Assembly. The executive council was to oversee and advise the governor, with the power to veto the governor’s actions and grant pardons. Additionally, the constitution allowed for an expansive franchise, with only the poorest excluded and those who could vote were required to vote or would subject to fine. These provisions resulted from the domination of the 1777 convention by "radicals" as opposed to the more moderate faction found in other states.

Georgia would be one of the only states to establish a unicameral legislature when it established the House of Assembly. Representation was split among the eight counties and allowed for two smallest counties as well as any new counties laid out by the House of Assembly to have the ability to gain more representatives as the county grows. The 1777 constitution included Articles on freedom of religion, press, trial by jury, habeas corpus, and protection against excessive fines. Georgia would also get rid of entailment and primogeniture making it the first U.S. state to abolish both practices (Virginia abolished entailment in 1776 but not primogeniture until 1785).

The adoption of the new federal constitution obliged Georgia to implement a new state one. Following three separate conventions, a new constitution was adopted in 1789. The new document replaced the unicameral Congress with a bicameral General Assembly. The executive council was abolished, and the legislature given power to elect the governor. Additionally, freedom of press, trial by jury, and freedom of religion were guaranteed. In 1795, a convention met to amend the recently adopted constitution. These amendments reapportioned the House of Representatives amongst the counties, with each county receiving one state senator. Additionally, the state capital was moved from Savannah to Louisville, and another convention scheduled for 1797 to further amend the document.

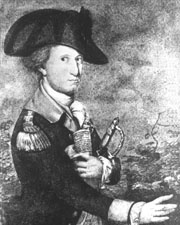
James Jackson, leader of the 1798 convention

In between the two conventions, the Yazoo land scandal dominated Georgia politics. The majority of the state legislature became implicated in the scandal, which involved Georgia's western lands (present-day Alabama and Mississippi). As a result, a number of legislators lost re-election, and reforms to property laws were enacted by their successors. Shortly after, the convention authorized in 1795 was postponed until 1798. James Jackson, Georgia's former U.S. Senator, played the dominant role in this convention as the governor at the time. The constitution produced by this new convention bore several similarities to the 1789 constitution. While the House was apportioned by population, each county was still guaranteed at least one representative. Notably, the new document prohibited land sales similar to those which prompted the Yazoo fraud. The 1802 cession by which Georgia transferred its western lands to the federal government rendered much of this provision moot, though it still applied to those lands Georgia eventually gained following the removal of the Cherokee people. This constitution would be amended twenty-three times before the Civil War. Georgia held conventions in 1833 and 1839 to reduce the number of representatives in the legislature but voters rejected it.

Just before the start of the Civil War, Georgia's Secession Convention drafted a new constitution for the state, led largely by Thomas Reade Rootes Cobb, the Convention's chairman. The new constitution largely left in place the framework of government found under the 1798 constitution, as amended. It did, however, include a longer bill of rights which was not found in the 1798 document.

=== Post-bellum constitutions (1865, 1868, and 1877) ===
Following the Civil War, a new constitution was drafted in 1865. In the aftermath of the war, the federal government oversaw the state's transition back into the Union. President Andrew Johnson appointed a provisional governor, who then convened a convention to draft a new constitution. The document retained many of the provisions of the 1861 constitution, including the bill of rights it had introduced. Major changes included a two-term limit for governors and the legislative election, rather than gubernatorial appointment of the Supreme Court. Additionally, Superior Court judges became popularly elected. The convention also abolished slavery in the state, although with great reluctance. Indeed, the constitution labeled the abolition of slavery "a war measure" by the federal government and also provided for compensation to slaveholders for the loss of their property.

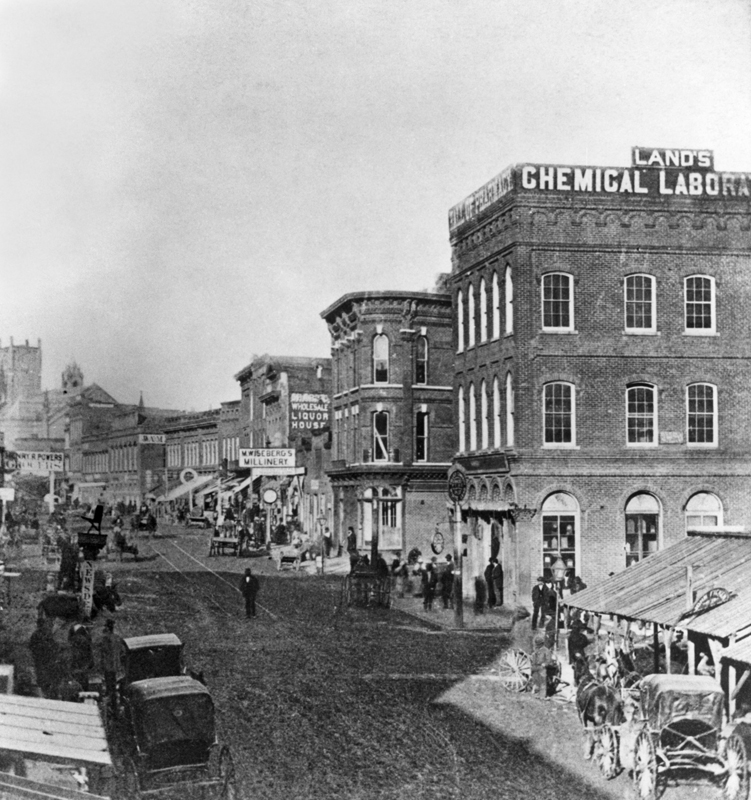
The 1868 Constitution moved the state capital to Atlanta. Shown here is Peachtree Street in 1875.

The 1865 Constitution had been adopted during the era of Presidential Reconstruction. In 1866, however, Congress passed the Military Reconstruction Acts, which placed Georgia and other former Confederate states under military rule. As a result, African Americans began to participate in the state government, along with "scalawags" who cooperated with the U.S. military. This new state government called for another convention to adopt a new constitution in 1868. Additionally, a number of "carpetbaggers," Northerners who moved to the South following the war, participated in the convention. The new state constitution aimed to provide rights for African Americans and promote racial equality in the state. Its bill of rights incorporated the 14th Amendment into the state constitution, and suffrage was granted to all males over the age of 21 regardless of race. The state government also was tasked with creating a system of public education. Additionally, the governor's term of office was extended to four years, with no limit, and the practice of electing judges was ended. The document also required amendments to be approved by popular vote rather than just by the state legislature and moved the capital to Atlanta.

In 1870, Georgia was readmitted to the Union, and, by 1872, Democrats regained control of the state legislature. Many of these Democrats identified as Bourbons, a faction representing the antebellum elite. With their return to power, the old elites quickly saw the need for a new constitution and called for a convention in 1877 to draft one. While much of the government structure remained the same, the new constitution restricted the power of the legislature significantly, including two articles devoted to taxation and state finances, and established the Secretary of State, Comptroller General and Treasurer as directly-elected offices. The two-year term for governors was reintroduced, along with the two-term limit. The document, in a reversal from 1868, mandated the segregation of the state's public schools. A prohibition of the creation of new counties was also included. Following its adoption, the 1877 constitution was amended numerous times. Many dealt with the structure of government, altering legislative apportionment and powers, introducing popular elections of judges. 188 amendments alone were made to Article VII, concerning state finances, mostly in regard to specific cities and counties. A number of new counties were also created by amendment. Most notably, an amendment in 1943 lowered the voting age to eighteen. This amendment made Georgia the first state to do so.

=== 20th-century constitutions (1945 and 1976) ===
In 1931, the University of Georgia's Institute of Public Affairs published a document titled "A Proposed Constitution for Georgia", which helped to spark public debate on a new constitution.

All constitutions up until 1945 were drafted by constitutional convention. That year, Governor Ellis Arnall appointed a twenty-three member commission, composed of all three branches of government, to write a new constitution.

In August 1945, a popular vote ratified the new document. The new document, however, did not represent a great change from the old constitution, of which 90% of the 1877 constitution's provisions (as amended) remained intact. Once again, an extensive bill of rights was included in the new document. The new document also made permanent several changes made over the years, including setting the voting age at eighteen and the introduction of a literacy test for voters. Other changes included provisions dealing with agencies created after 1877, including the State Board of Corrections. In addition, the offices of Lieutenant Governor, Agriculture Commissioner, Attorney General, State School Superintendent and Labor Commissioner. Some changes also affected local government in the state, including a cap on the number of counties at 159 (which remains the case today), and the introduction of provisions for home rule.

Subsequent to the new document's adoption, a number of provisions came under judicial scrutiny and were subsequently struck down. School segregation, mandated by Article VIII, was held to violate the U.S. Constitution by the Supreme Court in the 1954 case Brown v. Board of Education. Georgians resisted the decision, but a number of court decisions eventually forced the state's residents to comply. The system of legislative apportionment, along with Georgia's unique system to count votes in primary elections, were struck down in 1963 by the Court in the case of Gray v. Sanders due to their basis in counties rather than population.

These cases led many to consider revisions to the constitution. Efforts in the late 1960s were rejected, however, due to the continued malapportionment of the legislature. In 1974, George Busbee won the gubernatorial election on a platform of constitutional revision. By the time of Busbee's election, the constitution contained 831 amendments and was the nation's longest. The 1976 revision, however, produced little change beyond reorganizing the document's provisions. These amendments, now incorporated into the constitution, included correcting the legislative malapportionment and removing the office of Treasurer as a directly-elected constitutional officer.

=== Constitution of 1983 ===
In 1977, a select committee was created to discuss revision of the 1976 constitution. Members included the governor, lieutenant governor, the speaker of the House, the attorney general, representatives of the General Assembly and the judicial branch. Agreement on a constitution was made in August 1981 and in August and September of that year the document was submitted to the General Assembly in a special session. The constitution was approved on 25 September 1981 and went to vote in the general election and was ratified on 2 November 1982. The current Constitution streamlined the previous one and did away with authorization for local amendments.

== Articles of the Constitution ==
The Constitution consists of a Preamble and eleven Articles.

=== Preamble: Statement of Purpose ===
To perpetuate the principles of free government, insure justice to all, preserve peace, promote the interest and happiness of the citizen and of the family, and transmit to posterity the enjoyment of liberty, we the people of Georgia, relying upon the protection and guidance of Almighty God, do ordain and establish this Constitution.

The Preamble to the Georgia State Constitution is a brief introductory statement describing the principles which the Constitution is meant to serve. It expresses in general terms the intentions of its authors. It does not grant nor prohibit any authority to the state government. However, it has at times been used by the Supreme Court of Georgia to help in deciding a case. For instance, the Preamble was cited in 1982 in Roberts v. Ravenwood Church of Wicca, and later the portion of the Preamble which states "...promote the interest and happiness of the citizen and of the family..." was used in several court cases regarding family issues such as Clabough v. Rachwal, Dixon v. Dixon and Arnold v. Arnold.

=== Article I: Bill of Rights ===
Article One describes the Georgia Bill of Rights. These are the Rights of Persons, the Origin and Structure of Government and other General Provisions. The first Section, the Rights of Persons, lists twenty-eight paragraphs of individual rights. Many of these rights are similar to the rights listed in the United States Bill of Rights. Yet, there are differences. For instance, the Georgia Bill of Rights lists among its freedoms the Freedom of Conscience, which is the "natural and inalienable right to worship God, each according to the dictates of that person's own conscience" without interference and adds the right to religious opinion along with freedom of religion. Section II describes the "origin and foundation of government", the "object of government" the separation of powers and the superiority of civil authority over military authority. Also, this section explicitly describes the separation of church and state. Section III, General Provisions, deals with Eminent Domain, private ways and Tidewater titles. Finally, Section IV, Marriage, describes how the state recognizes marriage between a man and a woman and prohibits marriage between persons of the same sex. This section has since been overturned by the Federal Court Ruling, Obergefell v. Hodges.

=== Article II: Voting and Elections ===
Article Two describes Voting and Elections in Georgia. Specifically, the three Sections of the Article deal with the method of voting and the right to register and vote; general provisions and suspension and removal of public officials.

=== Article III: Legislative Branch ===
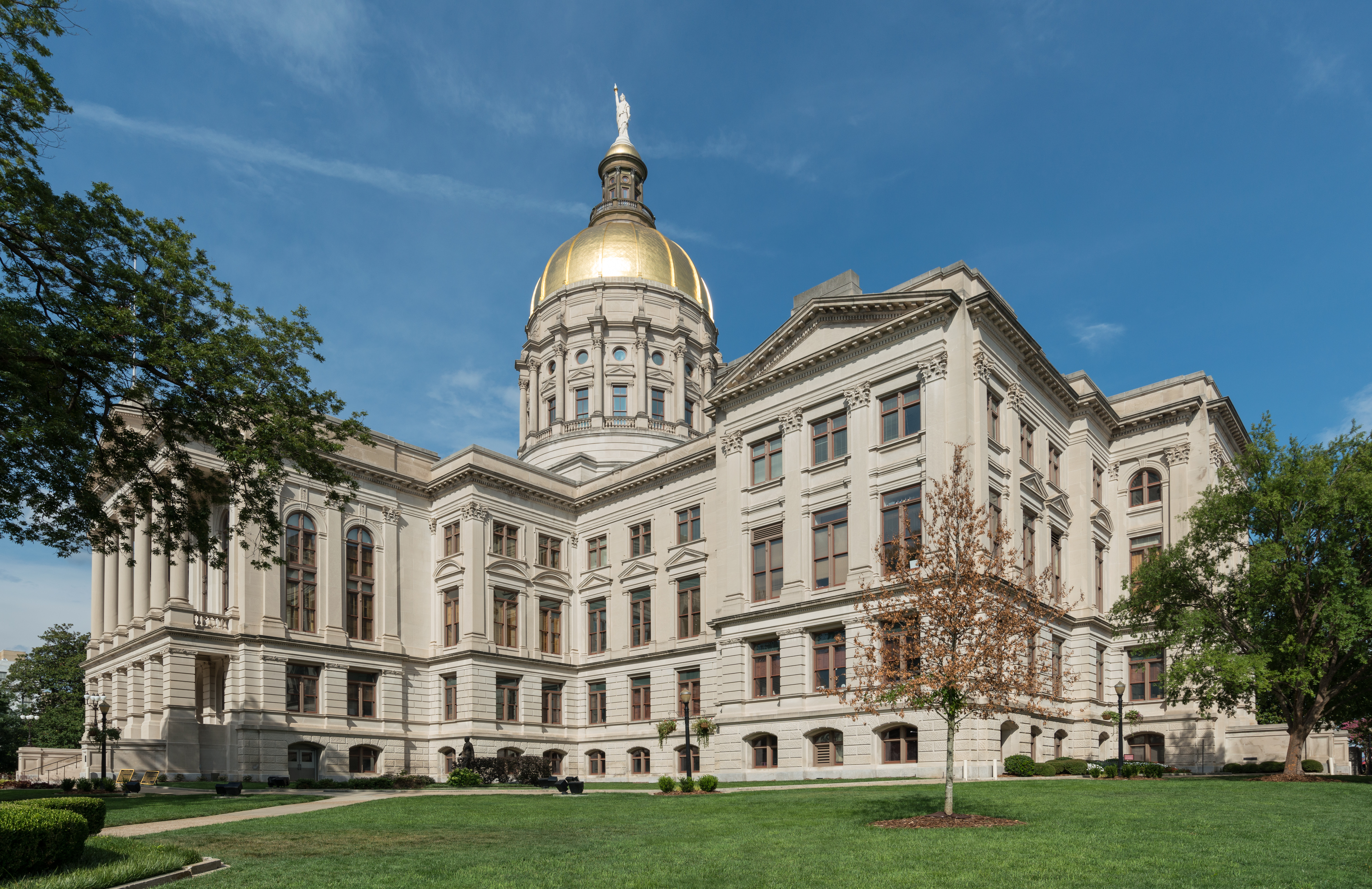
Georgia State Capitol, location of the General Assembly

Article Three describes the Legislative Branch of Georgia's government. The Article establishes legislative powers; the General Assembly's composition; officers of the General Assembly; organizations and procedures; the enactment of laws; the exercise of legislative power; method of impeachment; insurance regulation; appropriations; and retirement systems. Representatives must be at least 21 years old, have been a citizen of the state for at least two years, and be a resident of their district for at least one year. Senators must be 25 years old, have been a citizen for two years, and live in the district they represent for at least one year. Article Three establishes meetings, time limit and adjournment of the General Assembly and allows each house to establish its own rules of procedure, provide for its own employees and interim committees may be created by the General Assembly or by either house.

Article Three also prohibits the legislature from appropriating "gratuities" to individual members of the public. This clause prevents the state and local governments from directly giving money to individuals. It has been used to block proposed reparations to African Americans.

=== Article IV: Constitutional Boards and Commissions ===
Article Four describes Constitutional Boards and Commissions. This article consists of seven sections describing six boards and commissions and their powers. Section I deals with the creation of a Public Service Commission to regulate utilities. Section II created the State Board of Pardons and Paroles and outlines how parole can be given. Section III created the State Personnel Board and states how members are chosen. Section IV created the State Transportation Board. Sections V is responsible for the Veterans Service. Section VI created the Board of Natural Resources and outlines how members are chosen. Section VII outlines the qualifications, compensations, removal from office, and powers and duties of members of Constitutional boards and commissions.

=== Article V: Executive Branch ===
Article Five describes the Executive Branch of Georgia's government. This article is made up of four sections. Section I details the election of the governor and lieutenant governor. Section II lists the duties and powers of the governor. Section III discusses other elected officials and Section IV discusses the disability of executive officers and how to go about choosing a successor should an executive officer become permanently disabled.

=== Article VI: Judicial Branch ===
Article Six describes the Judicial Branch of Georgia's government. This article contains ten sections which discuss the different courts and their powers and jurisdictions. Article Six also details the role of the district attorney in Georgia's justice system. Article Six also solidified the courts which, prior to the current constitution, were terribly fragmented.

=== Article VII: Taxation and Finance ===
Article Seven deals with Taxation and Finance in Georgia. There are four Sections, each dealing with the power of taxation; exemptions from ad valorem tax; purposes and methods of state taxation and state debt. Powers of taxation cited in the Constitution include the limitation on grants of tax powers; taxing power limited and uniformity of taxation. Also included are the classification of property; assessment of agricultural land and utilities. Sections II and III, dealing with exemptions from ad valorem taxation and purposes and methods of state taxation respectively, focus on voiding unauthorized tax exemptions; exemptions from taxation on property; locally authorized exemptions; purposes for which powers may be exercised regarding taxation; revenue and the general fund and grants to counties and municipalities. Section IV's role regarding state debt is spelled out in eleven different paragraphs.

=== Article VIII: Education ===
Article Eight of the Constitution describes Education. This article deals with public schools; boards and offices responsible for education; local school systems; taxation and educational assistance.

=== Article IX: Counties and Municipal Corporations ===
Article Nine describes Counties and Municipal Corporations. Article Nine contains seven Sections concerning counties; home rule for counties and municipalities; intergovernmental relations; taxation power of county and municipal governments; limitation on local debt; revenue bonds and community improvement districts.

=== Article X: Amendments to the Constitution ===
Article Ten of the Constitution describes Amendments to the Constitution. This article has only one Section with nine paragraphs discussing amendments.

=== Article XI: Miscellaneous Provisions ===
Article Eleven of the Constitution describes Miscellaneous Provisions. The Article contains one Section with six paragraphs discussing the continuation of officers, boards, commissions, and authorities; judicial review and the preservation of existing law (law prior to the creation and ratification of the Constitution of 1983); confirmation of proceedings of courts and administrative tribunals; the continuation of a number of amendments for the next four years following the 1983 constitution going into effect; special commissions created and the date when the constitution became effective.

== Procedure for change ==
Article X of the Georgia Constitution provides provisions for changing the constitution. Specifically Paragraphs I, II, and IV deal with the subject. To amend the constitution or to begin a constitutional convention for the creation of a new document, such amendments must be proposed by the General Assembly, according to Paragraph I. Furthermore, such a proposal must originate as a resolution in either the Senate or the House of Representatives. Then, the "proposal by the convention to amend this Constitution or for a new Constitution shall be advertised, submitted to, and ratified by the people in the same manner provided for advertisement, submission, and ratification of proposals to amend the Constitution by the General Assembly," according to Paragraph IV.

== See also ==
- Law of Georgia
