= County unit system =

Voting system in Georgia, United States (1917–1962)

The county unit system was a voting system used by the U.S. state of Georgia to determine a victor in statewide primary elections, as well as some Congressional elections, from 1917 until 1962.

== History ==
Though the county unit system had informally been used since 1898, it was formally enacted by the Neill Primary Act of 1917. The system was ostensibly designed to function similarly to the Electoral College, and so in practice the large ratio of unit votes for small, rural counties to unit votes for more populous urban areas provided outsized political influence to the smaller counties.

For the period this system was in effect, the Democratic Party was the single dominant party in state politics. Democratic nominees frequently ran unopposed or with only token opposition in general elections, so the Democratic primary election usually determined the eventual officeholder. This was combined with other devices, such as white primaries, to make sure that only the votes of white rural voters would be reflected in statewide elections.

== Organization ==
Under the county unit system, the 159 counties in Georgia were divided by population into three categories. The largest eight counties were classified as "urban", the next-largest 30 counties were classified as "town", and the remaining 121 counties were classified as "rural". Urban counties were given 6 unit votes, town counties were given 4 unit votes, and rural counties were given 2 unit votes, for a total of 410 available unit votes. Each county's unit votes were awarded on a winner-take-all basis.

Candidates were required to obtain a majority of unit votes (not necessarily a majority of the popular vote), or 206 total unit votes, to win the election. If no candidate received a majority in the initial primary, a runoff election was held between the top two candidates to determine a winner.

== Controversy ==
The county unit system generated great controversy, since it gave the votes of counties with smaller populations a significantly greater weight than counties with larger populations. For at least the final two decades the system was in use, a majority of statewide unit votes were controlled by counties that, collectively, had less than one-third of the state's total population. Because of this, statewide candidates for office could (and frequently did) win the primary by winning the county unit vote while losing the overall popular vote, sometimes by large margins. This also gave rise to kingmakers such as Roy V. Harris, who were known for their ability to deliver the unit votes of many rural counties.

One of the most controversial elections of the county unit system era was the 1946 Democratic gubernatorial primary. By winning a large number of rural counties, Eugene Talmadge garnered a nearly 60% majority of the statewide county unit votes and won the primary, even though he lost the popular vote by 16,144 votes to James V. Carmichael, who himself only won a plurality, not a majority, of the popular vote.

Candidate	Popular vote		County unit vote	
Candidate	Votes	%	Votes	%
Eugene Talmadge	297,245	42.96	244	59.51
James V. Carmichael	313,389	45.30	144	35.12
Eurith D. Rivers	69,489	10.04	22	5.37
Hoke O'Kelley	11,758	1.70		
Total	691,881	100.00	410	100.00

== Legal challenges and overturning ==
Several lawsuits were filed in the 1940s and 1950s challenging the constitutionality of the system. These lawsuits were rejected by the U.S. Supreme Court on the grounds that apportionment issues should be handled by individual states. In 1962, however, the Supreme Court reversed its opinion, ruling in the Tennessee case of Baker v. Carr that redistricting issues present justiciable questions, thus enabling federal courts to intervene in and to decide reapportionment cases.

Following the 1962 Baker v. Carr decision, James Sanders, a voter in Fulton County, filed a lawsuit in the U.S. District Court for the Northern District of Georgia which challenged the legality of the county unit system. James H. Gray, the chairman of the State Executive Committee of the Democratic Party, was one of the defendants named in the suit. Judge Griffin Bell ruled in Sanders' favor, issuing an injunction against using the system just months before the 1962 gubernatorial primary.

Gray appealed the decision to the Supreme Court, which on March 8, 1963, rendered a decision by a vote of 8–1 declaring the county unit system unconstitutional in its current form. In the majority opinion, Justice William O. Douglas wrote, "The concept of political equality ... can mean only one thing—one person, one vote." The Gray v. Sanders case was the first "one person, one vote" decision handed down by the Supreme Court.

== Aftermath ==
Governor Ernest Vandiver had pledged to maintain the county unit system, but after Judge Bell issued the injunction against its usage, Vandiver then ordered the Georgia Democratic State Executive Committee to conduct the 1962 primary by popular vote.

Due to the court's injunction of the county unit system in 1962, that year's Democratic gubernatorial primary was the first to be decided by popular vote since 1908. It was won by Carl Sanders of Augusta, who would go on to win unopposed in the general election in November. Sanders was the first person from an urban county (Richmond) to be elected governor since the 1920s. In addition, a State Senate district was reconfigured in Fulton County, allowing for the election of Leroy Johnson as the first Black state legislator since 1908.

Candidate	Votes	%
Carl Sanders	494,978	58.07
Marvin Griffin	332,746	39.04
Grace Wilkey Thomas	12,579	1.48
Hoke O'Kelley	8,728	1.02
Cecil L. Langham	3,319	0.39
Total	852,350	100.00

Following the 1963 Gray v. Sanders decision, the Georgia Legislature had the option to redesign the county unit system to meet the new "one person, one vote" standard. The legislature chose, instead, to continue electing statewide offices by their popular vote, which continues to the present day. The newly elected Governor Sanders also spearheaded a massive reapportionment of Georgia's General Assembly and 10 U.S. Congressional districts, providing more proportional representation to the state's urban areas as well as to the first Black members elected to the State House.

However, conservative legislators feared the end of the county unit system as portending a loss of white power in the electoral process, and State Representative Denmark Groover drafted legislation to change the primary and general election systems from plurality voting to a two-round system. The bill was passed in 1964, but would not be extended to statewide executive elections until after the result of the 1966 Georgia gubernatorial election, which persuaded the General Assembly to send Amendment 2 to passage by referendum in 1968.

== Similar systems ==
=== Mississippi ===
Under Article 5, Sections 140-143 of the 1890 Constitution of Mississippi, a candidate for Governor of Mississippi needed a majority of voters across the state and a majority of voters in a majority of state House of Representatives districts; if no candidates achieved such a result, the state House of Representatives would choose between the top two finishers, something that only happened in 1999, when Ronnie Musgrove received 61 electoral votes, one short of a majority, and was also 2,936 votes (0.38%) short of a popular vote majority: the House elected Musgrove on the first ballot.

This structure was referred to as Mississippi's version of the electoral college; it was originally crafted, in the words of the Mississippi Historical Society, as part of "the legal basis and bulwark of the design of white supremacy". In the 21st century, because the state House districts favor Republican candidates, the provision was seen as helping Republican gubernatorial candidates as well.

A 2020 referendum amended Section 140 and repealed Sections 141-143. Under the new law, any candidate who receives a majority of statewide votes will be elected; if no candidate receives more than 50% of the vote, a statewide runoff election between the top two candidates will be held. The 2023 Mississippi gubernatorial election was the first to be held under the new law.
