= Ellis Arnall =

American politician, Governor of Georgia (1907–1992)

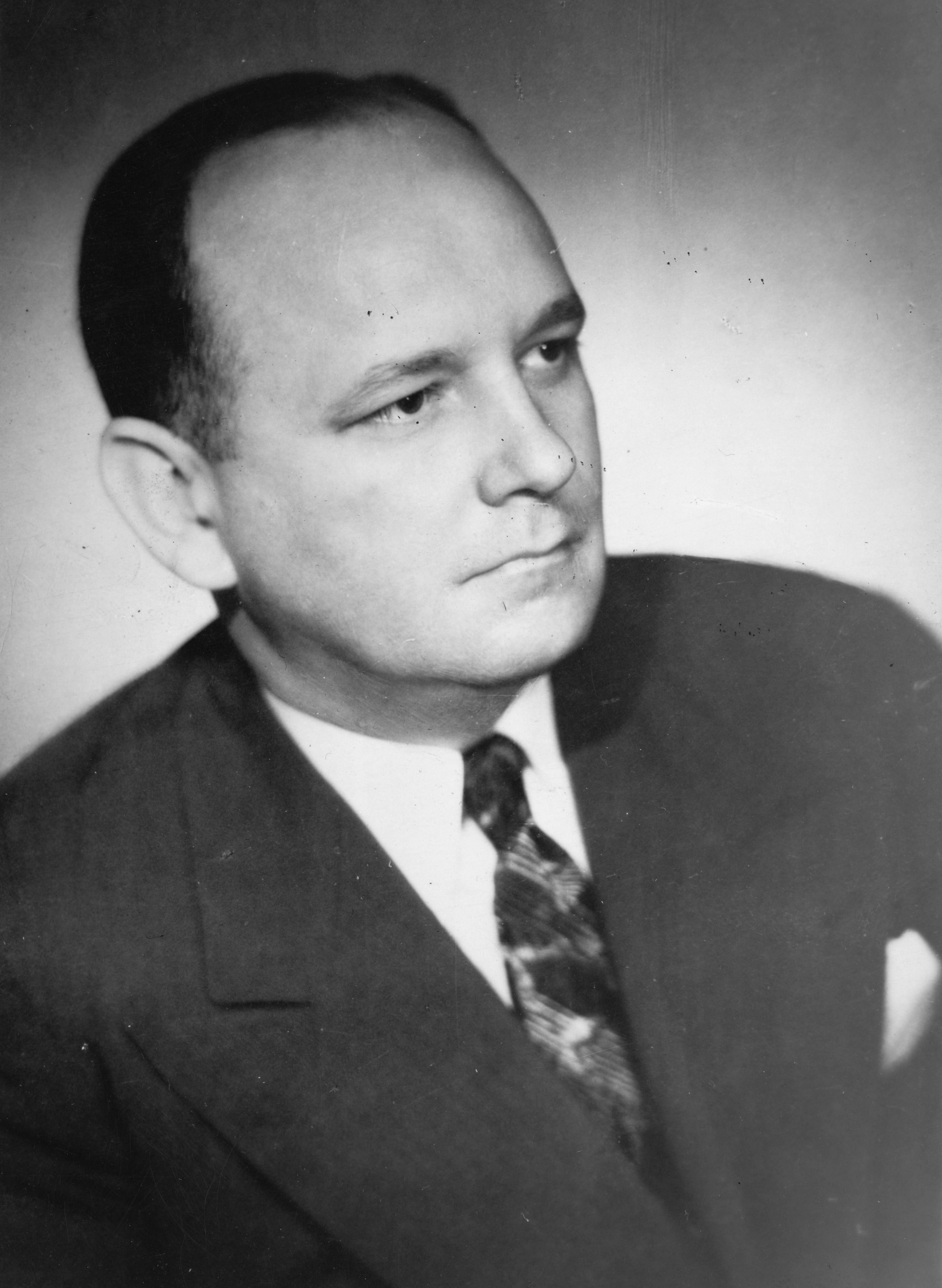
- Arnall c. 1945

69th Governor of Georgia
- In office January 12, 1943 – January 18, 1947
- Preceded by: Eugene Talmadge
- Succeeded by: Melvin Thompson

41st Attorney General of Georgia
- In office February 2, 1939 – January 12, 1943
- Governor: Eurith D. Rivers; Eugene Talmadge
- Preceded by: M. J. Yeomans
- Succeeded by: T. Grady Head

Personal details
- Born: Ellis Gibbs Arnall; March 20, 1907 Newnan, Georgia, U.S.
- Died: December 13, 1992 (aged 85) Atlanta, Georgia, U.S.
- Resting place: Oak Hill Cemetery; Newnan, Georgia, U.S.
- Party: Democratic
- Spouse(s): Mildred Delany Slemons Arnall; Ruby Hamilton Arnall
- Education: Mercer University; University of the South; University of Georgia School of Law
- Profession: Attorney

Ellis Gibbs Arnall (March 20, 1907 – December 13, 1992) was an American politician who served as the 69th governor of Georgia from 1943 to 1947. A liberal Democrat, he helped lead efforts to abolish the poll tax and to reduce Georgia's voting age to 18. Following his departure from office, he became a highly successful attorney and businessman.

== Family ==
Arnall learned that his first immigrant ancestor was a colonist from England who came to what was then the Colony of Virginia in 1621. A man named Edward Waters was given 100 acres of land in Elizabeth City, Virginia because he paid for the transportation of two servants to come to the colony. One of these servants was William Arnall, who arrived on a ship called the Seaflower in 1621. Edward Waters covered the cost of William Arnall’s trip, which was owed to a man named Thomas Hamor. The land was granted to Edward Waters on August 14, 1624.

== Education ==
Born in Newnan, Georgia, Ellis Arnall attended Mercer University in Macon, Georgia, then graduated from the University of the South, and then from the University of Georgia School of Law. He was admitted to the practice of law in 1931. While attending Mercer University, Arnall was initiated into Kappa Alpha Order.

== Early career ==
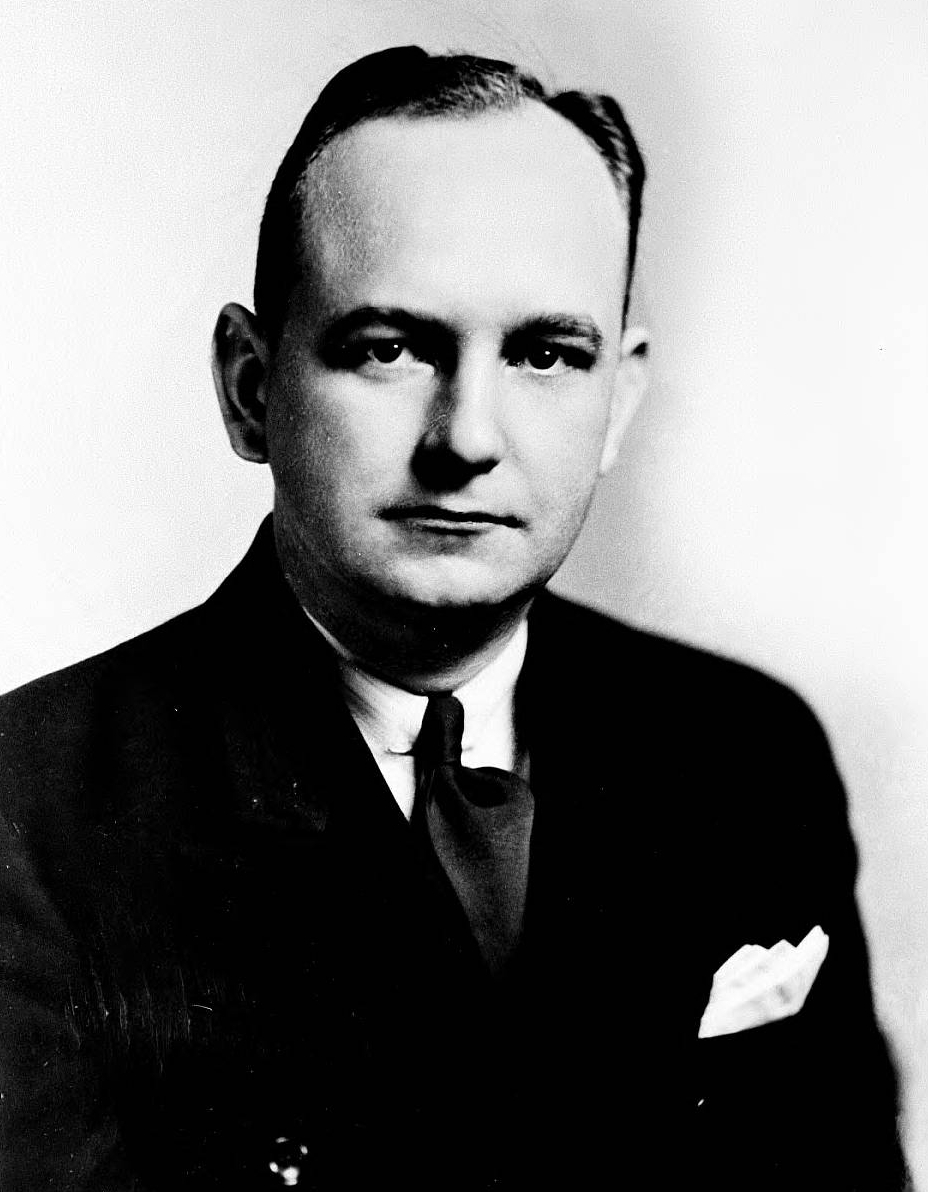
Arnall c. 1938

In 1932, Coweta County voters elected Arnall to the Georgia House of Representatives. Arnall was elected Speaker Pro Tempore, the second highest officer position in the Georgia House. In February 1939, Governor Eurith D. Rivers appointed Arnall to the office of state attorney general following the resignation of the incumbent, M. J. Yeomans. At 31 years old, Arnall was the youngest attorney general in state history.

In 1935, Arnall married Mildred Slemons, whom he met at a friend's wedding. The two were married until her death in 1980. Although Mildred Arnall was not particularly fond of politics and stayed out of the political arena, she stood by her husband throughout his career and encouraged him to succeed at whatever he did.

== Governor ==
Actions undertaken by Governor Eugene Talmadge had caused the state's colleges to lose accreditation. Arnall unseated Talmadge in the 1942 primary, 174,757 (57.7 percent) to 128,394 (42.4 percent). Without Republican opposition, Arnall became the youngest governor then serving in the United States.

Arnall obtained the repeal of the poll tax, ratification in 1945 of a new state constitution, and a state employee merit system. He also retired the Georgia state debt. When young men were drafted into the armed forces during World War II, Arnall argued that youths old enough to fight in war should be able to vote for their country's leadership. He succeeded in lowering the voting age to eighteen more than two decades before the Twenty-sixth Amendment to the United States Constitution implemented that change nationally. Georgia thus became the first state to grant the franchise to 18-year-olds. Arnall also removed the prison system from under the governor's direct control, establishing a board of corrections to oversee state prisons and a pardon and parole board to handle such requests. He removed the University of Georgia from political machinations, and he led efforts to prevent a governor from exercising dictatorial powers, as opponents of Eugene Talmadge stated had allegedly occurred during his administration. Arnall's reforms won him attention from the national press. Additionally, Arnall, who had become a proponent of civil rights, argued that African Americans should be able to vote in the state's primary election.

== Re-election attempt ==
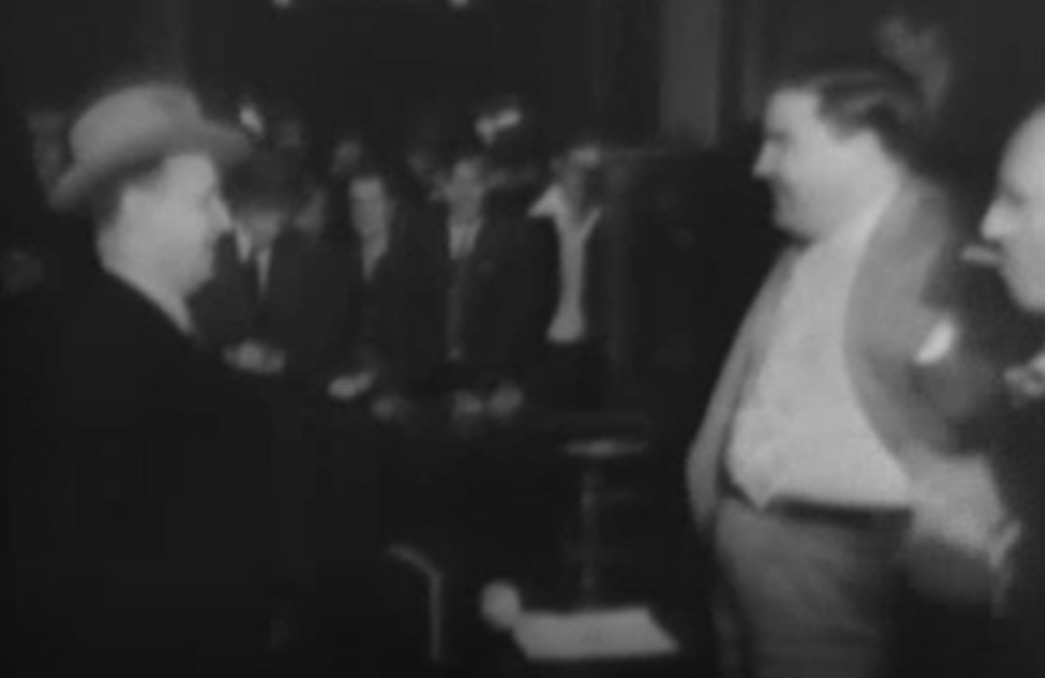
Arnall (left) being denied entry to the governor's Capitol office

In 1941 a constitutional amendment had lengthened the governor's term in Georgia from two years to four, but governors serving a four-year term were unable to seek re-election immediately; they had to wait at least four years to serve again. Arnall's career declined as he was unable to persuade the legislature to take steps to allow him to seek re-election. Arnall stood behind Henry A. Wallace's efforts to remain Vice President in 1944, when the former United States Secretary of Agriculture was replaced by U.S. Senator Harry S. Truman of Missouri. Arnall adhered to the United States Supreme Court decision banning the all-white Democratic party primary in the case Smith v. Allwright and hence opened the crucial Democratic primary elections to African Americans. This move particularly enraged Eugene Talmadge and his supporters, who used the issue to brand Arnall a 'race-traitor'.

Talmadge was elected governor once again in 1946, defeating James Carmichael (who was supported by Arnall) and another former governor, Eurith D. Rivers. However, he died in December, a month before he was scheduled to take office. The state legislature then elected Talmadge's son, Herman Talmadge, as governor. Arnall refused to resign the office during the controversy, and the younger Talmadge ended up locking Arnall out of his office in the state capitol. Arnall soon endorsed Lieutenant Governor-elect Melvin E. Thompson's initially unsuccessful claim to the governorship on January 18. The state's highest court, the Supreme Court of Georgia, soon ruled in March 1947 that the office devolved on Thompson. Talmadge then ceded the office to Thompson, ending the controversy.

== Later career ==
After leaving office, Arnall worked as an attorney and a businessman in Atlanta, founding Arnall Golden & Gregory (now Arnall Golden Gregory LLP), which continues to be one of Atlanta's leading law firms. One of his law partners was later U.S. Representative Elliott Levitas. Arnall served in the Truman administration for a short time as Director of the Office of Price Stabilization. Truman offered Arnall the post of Solicitor General but he declined in order to return to private practice. His business career made him a multimillionaire, and he was able to live comfortably for most of his life.

== 1966 election ==
Arnall's last campaign was for governor in 1966. His primary opponents for the nomination were Lester Maddox, an Atlanta restaurant owner who had hoisted ax handles as a symbol of his opposition to desegregation, and Jimmy Carter. Maddox called Arnall "the granddaddy of forced racial integration ... a candidate who would never raise his voice or a finger - much less an ax handle - to protect the liberty of Georgia." Arnall practically ignored Maddox and concentrated his fire on Republican Howard Callaway, on whom Arnall had compiled a dossier that he said would guarantee Republican defeat in the general election. Arnall won a plurality of the vote in the primary but was denied the required majority, because of support for Carter, then a state senator from Plains. Arnall barely campaigned in the runoff, and the result was a surprising victory for Maddox. Carter had refused to endorse Arnall, but he formally supported Maddox in the general election against Callaway.

Maddox defeated Arnall in the runoff, 443,055 to 373,004. The civil rights activist Martin Luther King Jr., denounced what he called "a corroding cancer in the Georgia body politic. Georgia is a sick state produced by the diseases of a sick nation. This election revealed that Georgia is desperately competing with Mississippi for the bottom." Mayor Ivan Allen, Jr., of Atlanta, who once worked for Arnall's law firm, blamed Arnall's loss on the "combined forces of ignorance, prejudice, reactionism, and the duplicity of many Republican voters," many of whom are believed to have voted for Maddox in the Democratic runoff on the theory that Maddox would be a weaker opponent for Callaway than Arnall would have been.

Stunned Arnall backers announced a write-in candidacy for the general election, a move that impacted Callaway more than it did Maddox. In the general election, Callaway finished in the tabulation with a slight plurality over Maddox. Arnall received more than 69,000 write-in ballots, far exceeding the margin between Callaway and Maddox. Arnall actually carried one county, Liberty County in the southeastern portion of the state. Under the election rules then in effect, the state legislature was required to select a governor from the two candidates with the highest number of votes. Despite court challenges, the Democratic-dominated legislature overwhelmingly voted for Maddox, who became governor in 1967.

After the 1966 campaign, Arnall never again sought public office.

Arnall was an active Civitan.

He wrote the 1946 book, The Shore Dimly Seen (J. B. Lippincott & Co.), about politics and challenges of the South.

== Death and legacy ==
Harold Paulk Henderson published the 1991 biography, The Politics of Change in Georgia: A Political Biography of Ellis Arnall.

He died in 1992 on his large estate. He was worth tens of millions of dollars at the time of his death. In 1997, Arnall was honored with a statue on the grounds of the Georgia State Capitol.

Arnall is interred at the Oak Hill Cemetery in his native Newnan.

Arnall Middle School in Newnan is named after him.

== Notes ==
Party political offices
Preceded by Eugene Talmadge	Democratic nominee for Governor of Georgia; 1942	Succeeded by Eugene Talmadge
Legal offices
Preceded by M. J. Yeomans	Attorney General of Georgia; 1939–1943	Succeeded by T. Grady Head
Political offices
Preceded by Eugene Talmadge	Governor of Georgia; 1943–1947	Succeeded by Melvin Thompson
