= Eurith D. Rivers =

American politician: Governor of Georgia (1895–1967)

E. D. Rivers
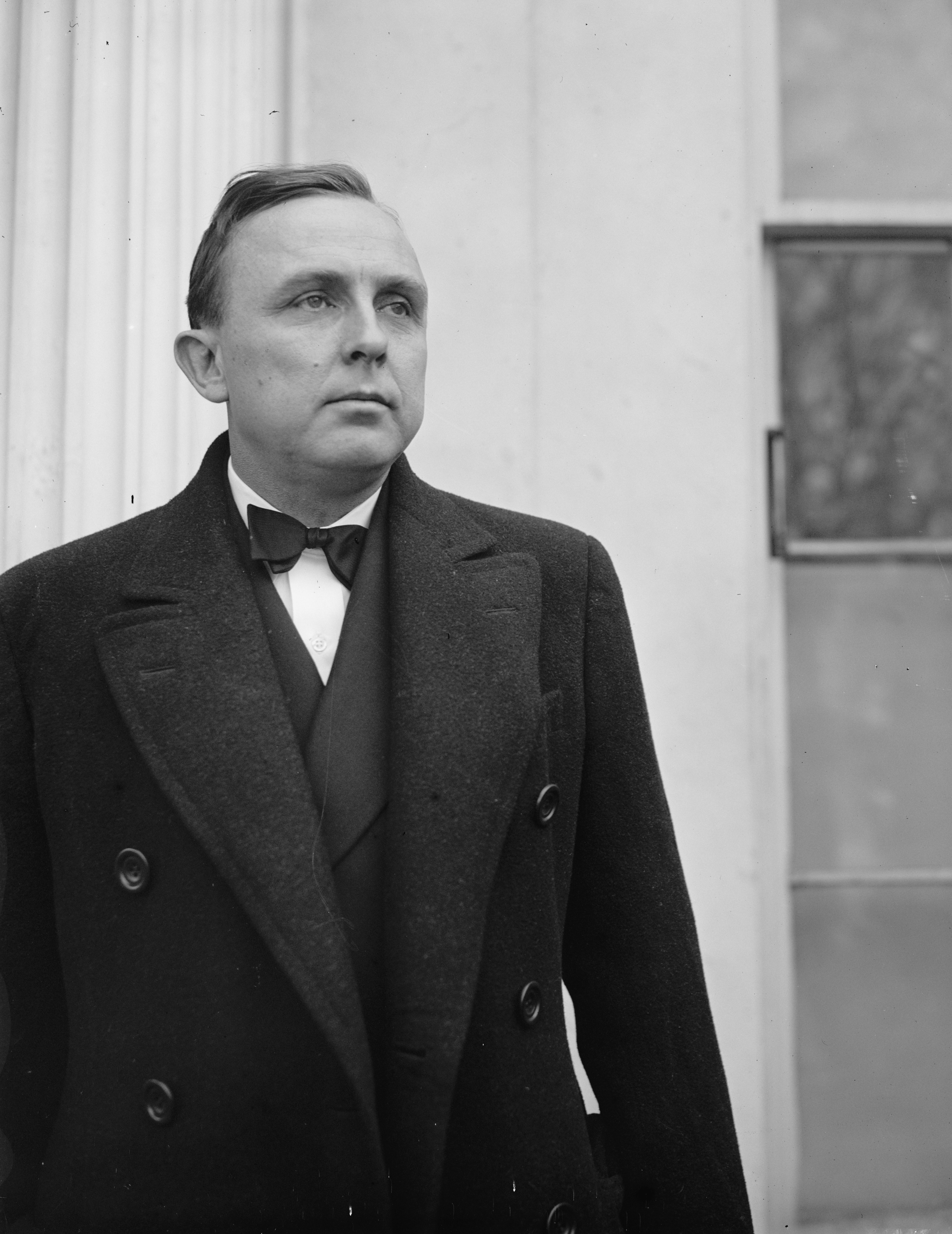
- Rivers visits the White House as governor-elect, 1936

68th Governor of Georgia
- In office January 12, 1937 – January 14, 1941
- Preceded by: Eugene Talmadge
- Succeeded by: Eugene Talmadge

Speaker of the Georgia House of Representatives
- In office 1933–1937

Member of the Georgia House of Representatives
- In office 1924

Member of the Georgia Senate
- In office 1926

Personal details
- Born: Eurith Dickinson Rivers; December 1, 1895 Center Point, Arkansas, U.S.
- Died: June 11, 1967 (aged 71) Atlanta, Georgia, U.S.
- Party: Democratic
- Spouse: Mattie Lucille Lashley
- Children: Eurith Dickinson Rivers Jr. and Geraldine
- Parent(s): Millie Annie Wilkerson and James Matthew Rivers
- Education: Young Harris College; LaSalle Extension University
- Profession: Attorney and newspaper editor

Eurith Dickinson Rivers (December 1, 1895 – June 11, 1967), commonly known as E. D. Rivers and informally as "Ed" Rivers,was an American politician from Lanier County, Georgia. A Democrat, he was the 68th governor of Georgia, serving from 1937 to 1941.

== Early life and education ==
Eurith Dickinson Rivers was born on December 1, 1895, in Center Point, Arkansas. He attended Young Harris College in North Georgia and settled in Cairo in South Georgia. Rivers also obtained a law degree through La Salle Extension University. Rivers served as a Justice of the Peace, Cairo City Attorney, and Grady County Attorney. He later moved to another South Georgia community, Milltown (now called Lakeland), to become editor of the Lanier County News.

== Career ==
Rivers was elected to the Georgia House of Representatives in 1924 and to the Georgia State Senate in 1926. During this time, he was a member of the Ku Klux Klan. In 1928 and 1930, Rivers was an unsuccessful candidate for the Democratic nomination for Governor. In 1932, he won another term in the Georgia House. He was elected Speaker, serving from 1933 to 1937.

In 1930, Rivers, a Great Titan of the Klan, speaking in front of a crowd in Clarke County, Georgia referred to an "alien invasion" attempting to "take away the freedom of government from the masses." The reference was made towards chain stores, which the Ku Klux Klan opposed.

His election as governor came after a stormy Democratic primary in 1936 in which the race served as a referendum on US President Franklin Roosevelt's New Deal. Since Georgia did not allow three consecutive terms, Governor Eugene Talmadge was not eligible for re-election. Talmadge, who strongly opposed the New Deal and had delayed its implementation in Georgia, ran for the US Senate and backed Charles D. Redwine for governor. Rivers, who, as Speaker, had strongly supported the New Deal, was Redwine's opponent and won with about 60 percent of the vote, the same margin by which Talmadge lost his Senate race.

Rivers' first two-year term as governor saw Georgia pass the legislation required to bring New Deal programs into the state. Rivers provided critical support for the 7-month school year. Under Rivers' leadership, electrical services were expanded to rural areas of the state. Georgia moved from the lowest-ranked state to the top of the list in the number of rural electrification associations. When he was in office, the State Bureau of Unemployment Compensation was created, allowing Georgians to receive unemployment benefits.

Upon his election, Rivers named Ku Klux Klan Imperial Wizard Hiram Wesley Evans as a member of his staff.

When Arthur Perry and Arthur Mack, two black men, faced rushed death sentences by an all-white jury for alleged murder, attorney and future Supreme Court justice Thurgood Marshall requested Rivers to grant due process to the defendants. Rivers replied: "Prison commission has no record of matter you mentioned in your wire of yesterday."

In 1938, rumors circulated that Franklin D. Roosevelt would endorse Rivers for United States Senate to oppose Walter F. George, who had opposed the president's Judicial Procedures Reform Bill of 1937, commonly known as the court-packing plan. Roosevelt's advisers warned him of Rivers' KKK connections, and the Georgia governor opted for re-election instead of seeking the Senate seat.

After Rivers' re-election in 1938, he ran into problems financing many of his improvement programs. Although the budget was reduced by 25 percent, he persuaded the legislature to create the Georgia Housing Authority and obtain federal funds to build public housing. During Rivers' second term, there were political scandals and charges of corruption. Many of Rivers' appointees and staff members were charged with corrupt practices. Rivers himself was criminally charged with corruption and embezzlement, related to the sale of pardons, in 1942. At trial, the jury deadlocked, and Rivers was not retried.

In 1939, Rivers proclaimed a state holiday for the December premiere of the film Gone With the Wind.

Rivers sought the governorship again in 1946 but finished a distant third behind Eugene Talmadge and James V. Carmichael in the Democratic primary.

== Later life and death ==
Rivers was never again elected to public office. He became a successful radio station owner. Rivers retired to Miami-Dade County, Florida, after putting WEDR Radio on the air in Miami. He died in Atlanta, Georgia, in 1967.

Rivers is the most recent Georgia governor to have been born outside the state.

== See also ==
- List of governors of Georgia
- List of speakers of the Georgia House of Representatives

Party political offices
| Preceded by Eugene Talmadge | Democratic nominee for Governor of Georgia; 1936, 1938 | Succeeded by Eugene Talmadge |
Political offices
| Preceded by Eugene Talmadge | Governor of the State of Georgia; January 12, 1937 – January 14, 1941 | Succeeded by Eugene Talmadge |
