= Benjamin W. Fortson Jr. =

American politician (1904–1979)

Benjamin Wynn Fortson Jr.
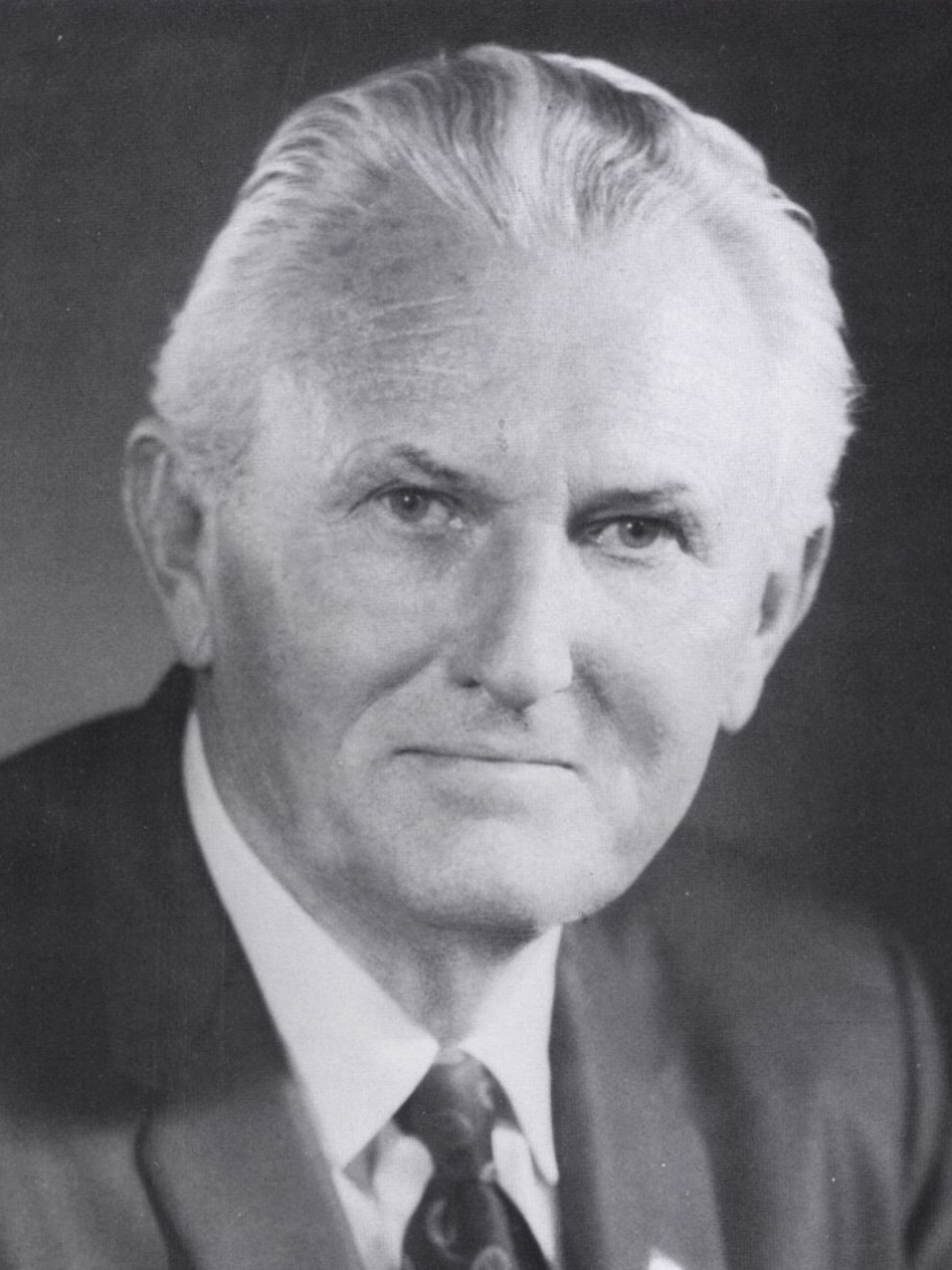
- Official portrait, circa 1970s

21st Secretary of State of Georgia
- In office 1946 – May 19, 1979
- Governor: Ellis Arnall; Eugene Talmadge; Melvin E. Thompson; Herman Talmadge; Marvin Griffin; Ernest Vandiver; Carl Sanders; Lester Maddox; Jimmy Carter; George Busbee
- Preceded by: John Bryan Wilson
- Succeeded by: David Poythress

Personal details
- Born: December 19, 1904 Wilkes County, Georgia, U.S.
- Died: May 19, 1979 (aged 74) Atlanta, Georgia, U.S.
- Resting place: Resthaven Cemetery, Wilkes County, Georgia
- Party: Democratic
- Spouse: Mary Cade (died 1966)
- Children: Ann McNeill Fortson Mandus
- Education: Emory University
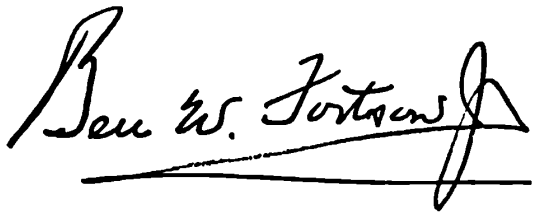
- Signature

Benjamin Wynn Fortson Jr. (December 19, 1904 – May 19, 1979) was a Secretary of State of Georgia. After being selected by Ellis Arnall, the governor in 1946, Fortson kept his title as secretary until 1979, making him the longest-running secretary in Georgia history.

== Background ==
Benjamin Wynn Fortson Jr. was born in 1904 in Wilkes County, Georgia. In 1929, at age 24, he was in a car accident that permanently paralyzed him from the waist down. This accident led him to use his spare time to study politics.

Fortson served two terms in the Georgia House of Representatives. He was elected to the Georgia Senate in 1938 and served until he was appointed secretary of state by Governor Ellis Arnall in February 1946 to fill the unexpired term of John B. Wilson. Fortson was elected in the next election and every four years thereafter.

He died on May 19, 1979, at the age of 74 at his home in Atlanta (DeKalb County) from heart failure. He was serving his ninth term as the Georgia Secretary of State when he died. After funeral services in the rotunda of the state Capitol, he was buried at Resthaven Cemetery in Wilkes County, Georgia.

== Secretary of State ==
Georgia Flags by Fortson, 1963

In 1946, Fortson was appointed secretary of state. While in office, he was assigned many different jobs that were not originally responsibilities of the office. Fortson was in charge of the preservation of the Capitol and looked after the Confederate cemeteries.

In 1965, Fortson had the Georgia Archives relocated to a building on Capitol Avenue because the archives were too big for its previous location. "Fortson often said this was his proudest accomplishment". The building was later renamed for him. Another accomplishment Fortson had while he was in office was the custom of giving information on Georgia history to teachers and allowing children to visit the Capitol. At one point there was a report that he was going to move up in office until he said that "Secretary of state is a fascinating job, not like being governor," revealing that he was running for another re-election.

=== Three governors controversy ===
The three governors controversy took place from 1946 to 1947. Eugene Talmadge was elected to be the next governor of Georgia, but he fell ill and died before he was inaugurated. Because of this, the General Assembly decided to elect Herman Talmadge, the son of Eugene Talmadge, to be the new governor of Georgia. However, two other people claimed the position. Ellis Arnall, the governor who was about to leave office, decided to stay governor and refused to leave his office. The other man was Melvin E. Thompson, the newly elected lieutenant governor. As Secretary of State, Fortson was in charge of the state seal. No one could do official government actions without this seal, so Fortson hid the seal and refused to tell anyone where it was until the government issue was resolved. This caused the council to take action. After the dispute ended, he revealed the location of the hidden seal. Fortson had put the seal under a cushion in his wheelchair and had been sitting on it during the dispute. Fortson later quoted that he was "sitting on it like a setting of duck eggs." The controversy ended with Thompson being declared the governor by the Georgia Supreme Court, setting a precedent in Georgia law.

Party political offices
Preceded by John Bryan Wilson	Democratic nominee for Secretary of State of Georgia; 1946, 1950, 1954, 1958, 1962, 1966, 1970, 1974, 1978	Succeeded by Max Cleland
Preceded by John Bryan Wilson	Secretary of State of Georgia; 1946–1979	Succeeded by David Poythress
