= 1954 Georgia lieutenant gubernatorial election =

- November 2, 1954
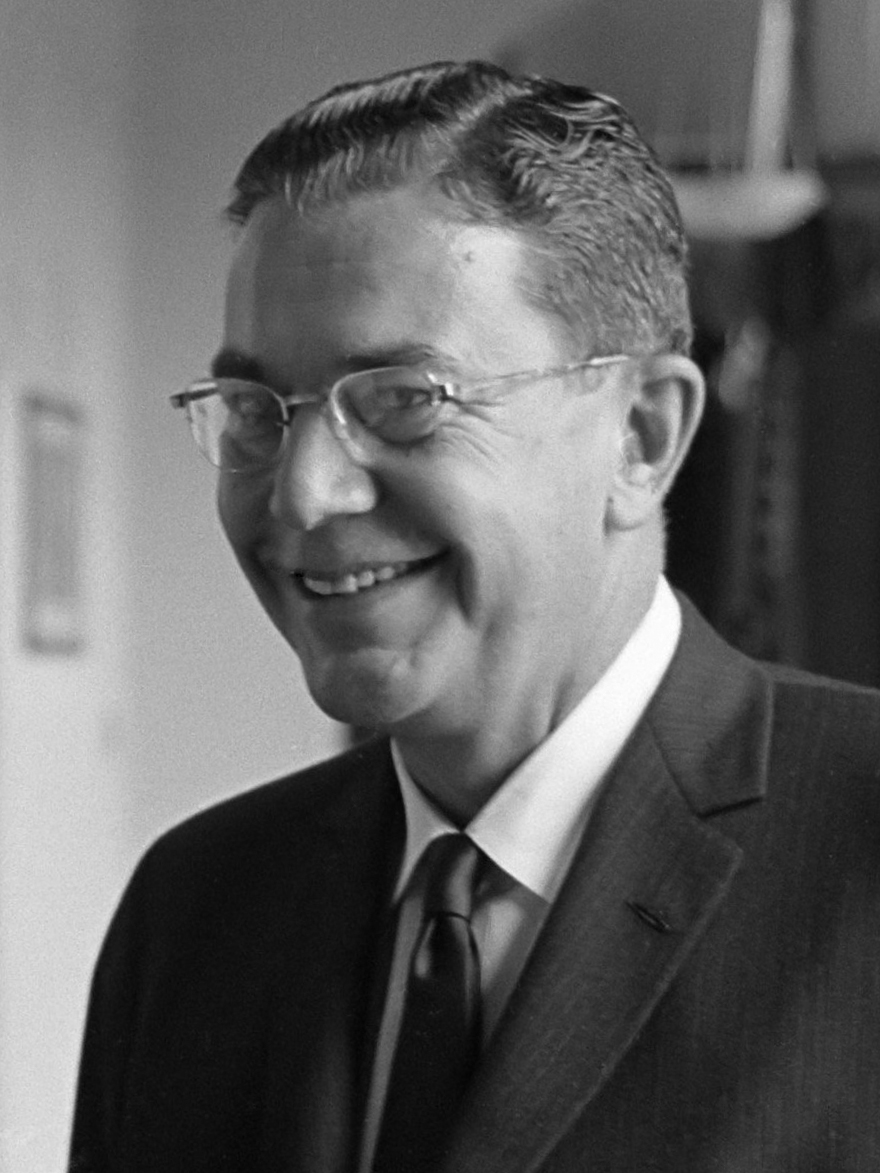
Nominee	Ernest Vandiver
Party	Democratic
Popular vote	331,042
Percentage	100.00%
Lieutenant Governor before election
Marvin Griffin
Democratic
Elected Lieutenant Governor
Ernest Vandiver
Democratic

The 1954 Georgia lieutenant gubernatorial election was held on November 2, 1954, in order to elect the lieutenant governor of Georgia. Democratic nominee Ernest Vandiver ran unopposed and subsequently won the election.

== Democratic primary ==
The Democratic primary election was held on September 8, 1954. Candidate Ernest Vandiver received a majority of the votes (48.22%), and was thus elected as the nominee for the general election.

=== Results ===
1954 Democratic lieutenant gubernatorial primary
Party	Candidate	Votes	%
Democratic	Ernest Vandiver	289,112	48.22%
Democratic	John W. Greer	128,911	21.50%
Democratic	William K. Barrett	120,736	20.14%
Democratic	William T. Dean	60,841	10.14%
Total votes		599,600	100.00%

== General election ==
On election day, November 2, 1954, Democratic nominee Ernest Vandiver ran unopposed and won the election with 331,042 votes, thereby retaining Democratic control over the office of lieutenant governor. Vandiver was sworn in as the 3rd lieutenant governor of Georgia on January 3, 1955.

=== Results ===
Georgia lieutenant gubernatorial election, 1954
Party	Candidate	Votes	%
Democratic	Ernest Vandiver	331,042	100.00
Total votes		331,042	100.00
Democratic hold			
