= 1966 Georgia lieutenant gubernatorial election =

- November 8, 1966
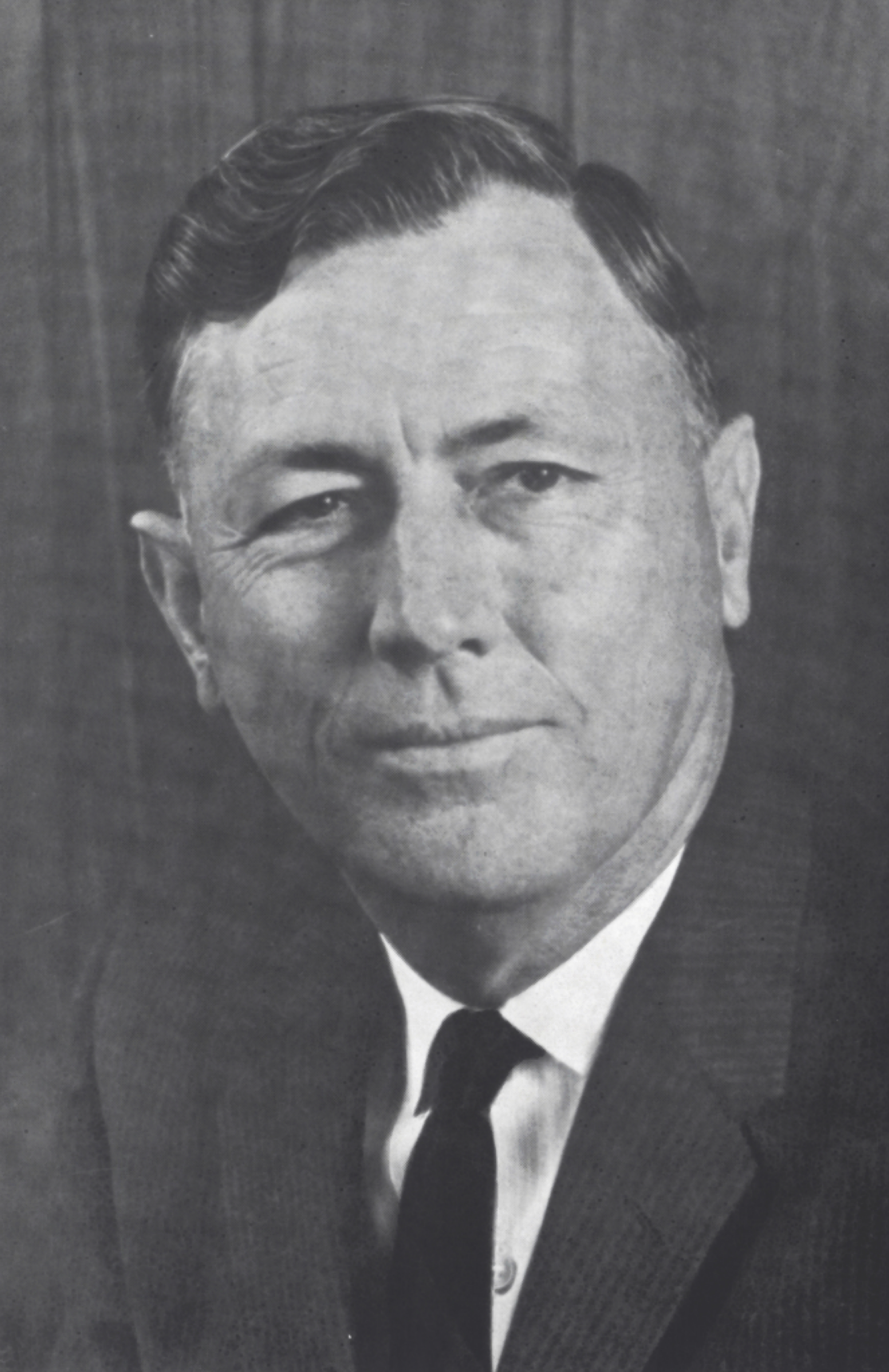
Nominee	George T. Smith
Party	Democratic
Popular vote	637,095
Percentage	100.00%
Lieutenant Governor before election
Peter Zack Geer
Democratic
Elected Lieutenant Governor
George T. Smith
Democratic

The 1966 Georgia lieutenant gubernatorial election was held on November 8, 1966, in order to elect the lieutenant governor of Georgia. Democratic nominee and incumbent member of the Georgia House of Representatives George T. Smith ran unopposed and subsequently won the election.

== Democratic primary ==
The Democratic primary election was held on September 14, 1966, but as no candidate received a majority of the vote, a run-off election was held between incumbent lieutenant governor Peter Zack Geer and George T. Smith on September 28, 1966. Candidate George T. Smith received a majority of the votes (55.54%) in the run-off election against Geer, and was thus elected as the nominee for the general election.

=== Candidates ===
==== Nominee ====
- George T. Smith, Speaker of the Georgia House of Representatives (1963–1967) from the 90th district (1959–1967)

==== Eliminated in runoff ====
- Peter Zack Geer, lieutenant governor (1963–1967)

==== Eliminated in primary ====
- W. Randall Bedgood Jr., state representative

=== Results ===
Democratic primary results
Party	Candidate	Votes	%
Democratic	Peter Zack Geer	358,182	49.1
Democratic	George T. Smith	310,934	42.6
Democratic	W. Randall Bedgood Jr.	61,005	8.3
Total votes		730,121	100.0

==== Runoff Results ====
Smith: Smith—50–60%; Smith—60–70%; Smith—70–80%; Zack Geer: Zack Geer—50–60%; Zack Geer—60–70%; Zack Geer—70–80%; Zack Geer—<90%

Democratic primary runoff results
Party	Candidate	Votes	%
Democratic	George T. Smith	447,855	55.55
Democratic	Peter Zack Geer	358,510	44.45
Total votes		806,365	100.0

== General election ==
On election day, November 8, 1966, Democratic nominee George T. Smith ran unopposed and won the election with 637,095 votes, thereby retaining Democratic control over the office of lieutenant governor. Smith was sworn in as the 6th lieutenant governor of Georgia on January 10, 1967.

=== Results ===
Georgia lieutenant gubernatorial election, 1966
Party	Candidate	Votes	%
Democratic	George T. Smith	637,095	100.00
Total votes		637,095	100.00
Democratic hold			
