= 1962 Georgia lieutenant gubernatorial election =

- November 6, 1962
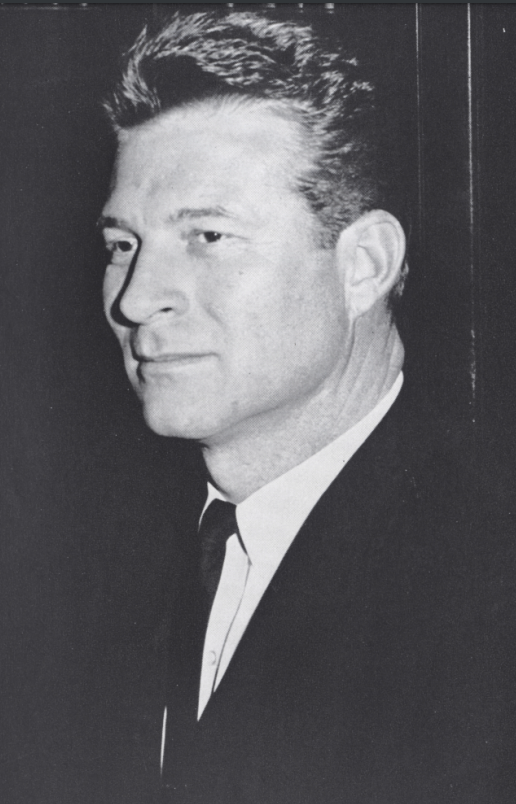
Nominee	Peter Zack Geer
Party	Democratic
Popular vote	297,345
Percentage	100.00%
Lieutenant Governor before election
Garland T. Byrd
Democratic
Elected Lieutenant Governor
Peter Zack Geer
Democratic

The 1962 Georgia lieutenant gubernatorial election was held on November 6, 1962, in order to elect the lieutenant governor of Georgia. Democratic nominee Peter Zack Geer ran unopposed and subsequently won the election.

== Democratic primary ==
The Democratic primary election was held on September 12, 1962, but as no candidate received a majority of the vote, a run-off election was held between Peter Zack Geer and Lester Maddox on September 26, 1962. Candidate Peter Zack Geer received a majority of the votes (55.06%) in the run-off election against Maddox, and was thus elected as the nominee for the general election.

=== Results ===
Candidate	First Round		Run-off	
Candidate	Votes	%	Votes	%
Peter Zack Geer	187,770	23.90	215,369	55.06
Lester Maddox	138,065	17.58	175,757	44.94
Peyton S. Hawes	110,420	14.06		
Culver Kidd Jr.	108,601	13.83		
Ed Wilson	84,157	10.71		
John E. Sheffield Jr.	55,020	7.00		
Winston Burdine	49,418	6.29		
Spence M. Grayson	32,900	4.19		
Edmond Barfield	19,169	2.44		
Total	785,520	100.00	391,126	100.00

== General election ==
On election day, November 6, 1962, Democratic nominee Peter Zack Geer ran unopposed and won the election with 297,345 votes, thereby retaining Democratic control over the office of lieutenant governor. Geer was sworn in as the 5th lieutenant governor of Georgia on January 3, 1963.

=== Results ===
Georgia lieutenant gubernatorial election, 1962
Party	Candidate	Votes	%
Democratic	Peter Zack Geer	297,345	100.00
Total votes		297,345	100.00
Democratic hold			
