= 1958 Georgia lieutenant gubernatorial election =

- November 4, 1958
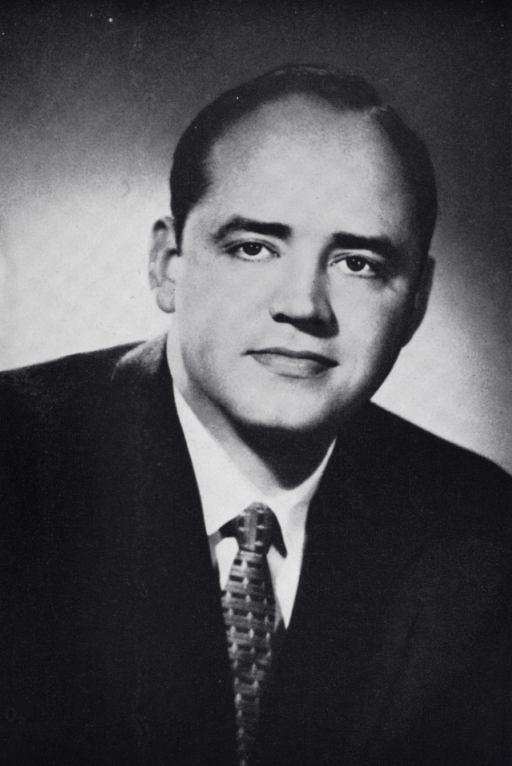
Nominee	Garland T. Byrd
Party	Democratic
Popular vote	163,034
Percentage	100.00%
Lieutenant Governor before election
Ernest Vandiver
Democratic
Elected Lieutenant Governor
Garland T. Byrd
Democratic

The 1958 Georgia lieutenant gubernatorial election was held on November 4, 1958, in order to elect the lieutenant governor of Georgia. Democratic nominee Garland T. Byrd ran unopposed and subsequently won the election.

== Democratic primary ==
The Democratic primary election was held on September 10, 1958. Candidate Garland T. Byrd received a majority of the votes (68.63%), and was thus elected as the nominee for the general election.

=== Results ===
1958 Democratic lieutenant gubernatorial primary
Party	Candidate	Votes	%
Democratic	Garland T. Byrd	395,801	68.63%
Democratic	W. Colbert Hawkins	61,981	10.75%
Democratic	C. J. Broome	49,686	8.62%
Democratic	John D. Odom	39,131	6.79%
Democratic	Howell Smith Jr.	30,153	5.21%
Total votes		576,752	100.00%

== General election ==
On election day, November 4, 1958, Democratic nominee Garland T. Byrd ran unopposed and won the election with 163,034 votes, thereby retaining Democratic control over the office of lieutenant governor. Byrd was sworn in as the 4th lieutenant governor of Georgia on January 13, 1959.

=== Results ===
Georgia lieutenant gubernatorial election, 1958
Party	Candidate	Votes	%
Democratic	Garland T. Byrd	163,034	100.00
Total votes		163,034	100.00
Democratic hold			
