= 1946 Georgia lieutenant gubernatorial election =

- November 5, 1946
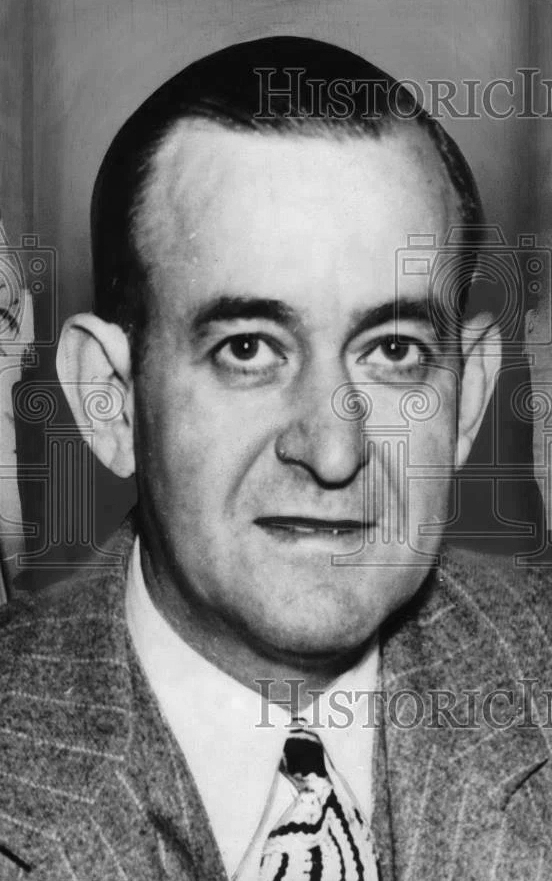
Nominee	Melvin E. Thompson
Party	Democratic
Popular vote	161,513
Percentage	100.00%
Lieutenant Governor before election
Office Established
Elected Lieutenant Governor
Melvin E. Thompson
Democratic

The 1946 Georgia lieutenant gubernatorial election was held on November 5, 1946, in order to elect the first lieutenant governor of Georgia. Democratic nominee Melvin E. Thompson ran unopposed and subsequently won the election.

== Democratic primary ==
The Democratic primary election was held on July 17, 1946. Candidate Melvin E. Thompson received a majority of the votes (29.61%), and was thus elected as the nominee for the general election.

=== Results ===
1946 Democratic lieutenant gubernatorial primary
Party	Candidate	Votes	%
Democratic	Melvin E. Thompson	190,332	29.61%
Democratic	Marvin Griffin	160,082	24.91%
Democratic	L. N. Huff	104,416	16.25%
Democratic	Frank C. Gross	87,500	13.61%
Democratic	Spence M. Grayson	66,177	10.30%
Democratic	Belmont Dennis	34,253	5.32%
Total votes		642,760	100.00%

== General election ==
On election day, November 5, 1946, Democratic nominee Melvin E. Thompson ran unopposed and won the election with 161,513 votes, thereby gaining Democratic control over the newly established office of lieutenant governor. Thompson was sworn in as the 1st lieutenant governor of Georgia on January 3, 1947.

=== Results ===
Georgia lieutenant gubernatorial election, 1946
Party	Candidate	Votes	%
Democratic	Melvin E. Thompson	161,513	100.00
Total votes		161,513	100.00
Democratic hold			
