= 2016 DeKalb County, Georgia Chief Executive Officer election =

- November 8, 2016
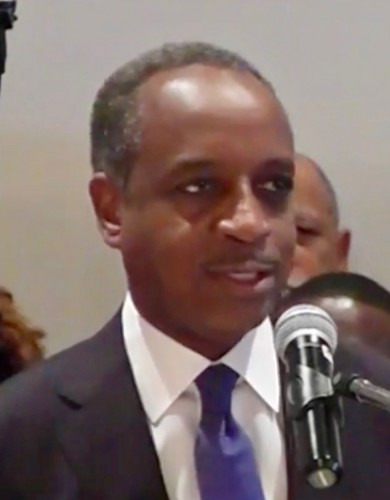

Candidate	Mike Thurmond	Jack Lovelace
Party	Democratic	Republican
Popular vote	241,773	60,621
Percentage	79.85%	20.02%
CEO before election
Burrell Ellis (suspended)
Lee May (interim)
Democratic
Elected CEO
Mike Thurmond
Democratic

The 2016 DeKalb County, Georgia Chief Executive Officer election took place on November 8, 2016. Incumbent CEO Burrell Ellis was indicted for perjury and attempted theft by extortion in 2013 and was suspended from office by Governor Nathan Deal on July 16, 2013, who appointed County Commissioner Lee May as interim CEO. Burrell was term-limited and could not seek another term, and May declined to run in the 2016 election.

Former Labor Commissioner Mike Thurmond won the Democratic primary over former State Senator Connie Stokes and perennial candidate Joe Bembry in a landslide, receiving 72 percent of the vote. In the general election, he was opposed by retired businessman Jack Lovelace, the Republican nominee. Thurmond defeated Lovelace, 80–20 percent, and won his first term as CEO.

== Democratic primary ==
=== Candidates ===
- Mike Thurmond, former interim Superintendent of the DeKalb County School District, former Georgia Commissioner of Labor, 2010 Democratic nominee for the U.S. Senate
- Connie Stokes, former State Senator, 2014 Democratic nominee for Lieutenant Governor
- Joe Bembry, perennial candidate

==== Declined ====
- Lee May, interim CEO, former County Commissioner

=== Results ===
Democratic primary results
Party	Candidate	Votes	%
Democratic	Mike Thurmond	39,639	71.82%
Democratic	Connie Stokes	14,180	25.69%
Democratic	Joe Bembry	1,370	2.48%
Total votes		55,189	100.00%

== Republican primary ==
=== Candidates ===
- Jack Lovelace, retired businessman

=== Results ===
Republican primary results
Party	Candidate	Votes	%
Republican	Jack Lovelace	7,568	100.00%
Total votes		7,568	100.00%

== General election ==
=== Results ===
2016 DeKalb County, Georgia Chief Executive Officer election
Party	Candidate	Votes	%
Democratic	Mike Thurmond	241,773	79.85%
Republican	Jack Lovelace	60,621	20.02%
Write-in		402	0.13%
Total votes		302,796	100.00%
Democratic hold			
