= 1948 Georgia lieutenant gubernatorial special election =

- November 2, 1948
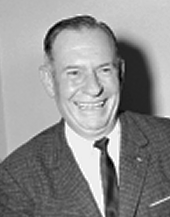
| Nominee | Marvin Griffin |
| Party | Democratic |
| Popular vote | 366,289 |
| Percentage | 100.00% |
Lieutenant Governor before election
Melvin E. Thompson
Democratic
Elected Lieutenant Governor
Marvin Griffin
Democratic

The 1948 Georgia lieutenant gubernatorial special election was held on November 2, 1948, in order to elect the lieutenant governor of Georgia upon the succession of Lieutenant Governor Melvin E. Thompson to the Georgia governorship on March 18, 1947. Democratic nominee Marvin Griffin ran unopposed and subsequently won the election.

== Democratic primary ==
The Democratic primary election was held on September 8, 1948. Candidate Marvin Griffin received a majority of the votes (49.09%), and was thus elected as the nominee for the general election.

=== Results ===
1948 Democratic lieutenant gubernatorial primary
| Party | Candidate | Votes | % |
|---|---|---|---|
| Democratic | Marvin Griffin | 331,520 | 49.09% |
| Democratic | Henry Persons | 206,384 | 30.56% |
| Democratic | L. N. Huff | 89,611 | 13.27% |
| Democratic | Belmont Dennis | 47,812 | 7.08% |
| Total votes | | 675,327 | 100.00% |

== General election ==
On election day, November 2, 1948, Democratic nominee Marvin Griffin ran unopposed and won the election with 366,289 votes, thereby retaining Democratic control over the office of lieutenant governor. Griffin was sworn in as the 2nd lieutenant governor of Georgia on January 3, 1949.

=== Results ===
Georgia lieutenant gubernatorial special election, 1948
| Party | Candidate | Votes | % |
|---|---|---|---|
| Democratic | Marvin Griffin | 366,289 | 100.00 |
| Total votes | | 366,289 | 100.00 |
| Democratic hold | | | |
