= 2006 Georgia lieutenant gubernatorial election =

- November 7, 2006
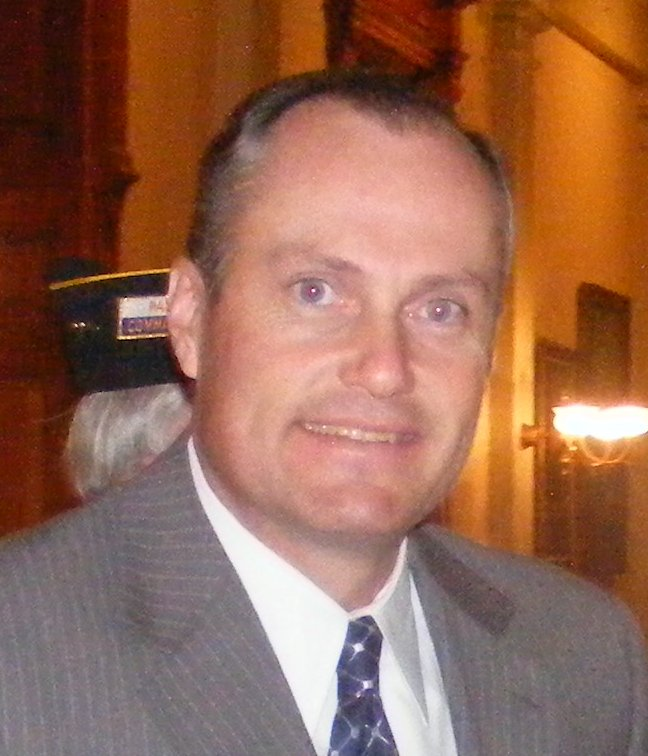

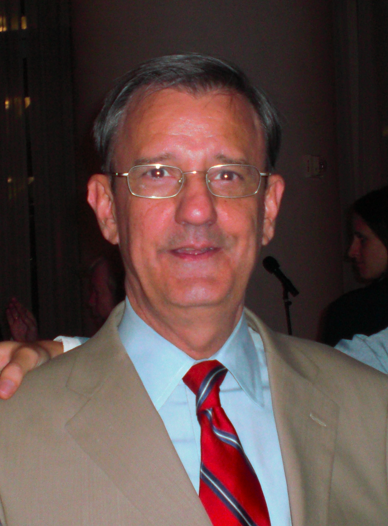
Nominee	Casey Cagle	Jim Martin
Party	Republican	Democratic
Popular vote	1,134,517	887,506
Percentage	54.08%	42.31%
- County results Cagle: 40–50% 50–60% 60–70% 70–80% Martin: 40–50% 50–60% 60–70% 70–80%
Lieutenant Governor before election
Mark Taylor
Democratic
Elected Lieutenant Governor
Casey Cagle
Republican

The 2006 Georgia lieutenant gubernatorial election was held on November 7, 2006, in order to elect the lieutenant governor of Georgia. Republican nominee and incumbent member of the Georgia State Senate Casey Cagle defeated Democratic nominee and former member of the Georgia House of Representatives Jim Martin and Libertarian nominee Allen Buckley.

== Democratic primary ==
The Democratic primary election was held on July 18, 2006, but as no candidate received a majority of the vote, a run-off election was held between former member of the Georgia House of Representatives Jim Martin and former member of the Georgia State Senate Greg Hecht on August 8, 2006. Candidate Jim Martin received a majority of the votes (62.43%) in the run-off election against Hecht, and was thus elected as the nominee for the general election.

=== Results ===
Candidate	First Round		Run-off	
Candidate	Votes	%	Votes	%
Jim Martin	184,635	41.20	141,927	62.43
Greg Hecht	163,004	36.38	85,399	37.57
Steen Miles	64,714	14.44		
Griffin Loston	22,378	4.99		
Rufus Terrill	13,375	2.98		
Total	448,106	100.00	227,326	100.00

== Republican primary ==
The Republican primary election was held on July 18, 2006. Incumbent member of the Georgia State Senate Casey Cagle received a majority of the votes (56.05%), and was thus elected as the nominee for the general election.

=== Results ===
2006 Republican lieutenant gubernatorial primary
Party	Candidate	Votes	%
Republican	Casey Cagle	227,968	56.05%
Republican	Ralph Reed	178,790	43.95%
Total votes		406,758	100.00%

== General election ==
On election day, November 7, 2006, Republican nominee Casey Cagle won the election by a margin of 247,011 votes against his foremost opponent Democratic nominee Jim Martin, thereby gaining Republican control over the office of lieutenant governor. Cagle was sworn in as the 11th lieutenant governor of Georgia on January 3, 2007.

=== Results ===
Georgia lieutenant gubernatorial election, 2006
Party	Candidate	Votes	%
Republican	Casey Cagle	1,134,517	54.08
Democratic	Jim Martin	887,506	42.31
Libertarian	Allen Buckley	75,673	3.60
Write-in		117	0.01
Total votes		2,097,813	100.00
Republican gain from Democratic			
