= 1966 Georgia gubernatorial election =

- November 8, 1966
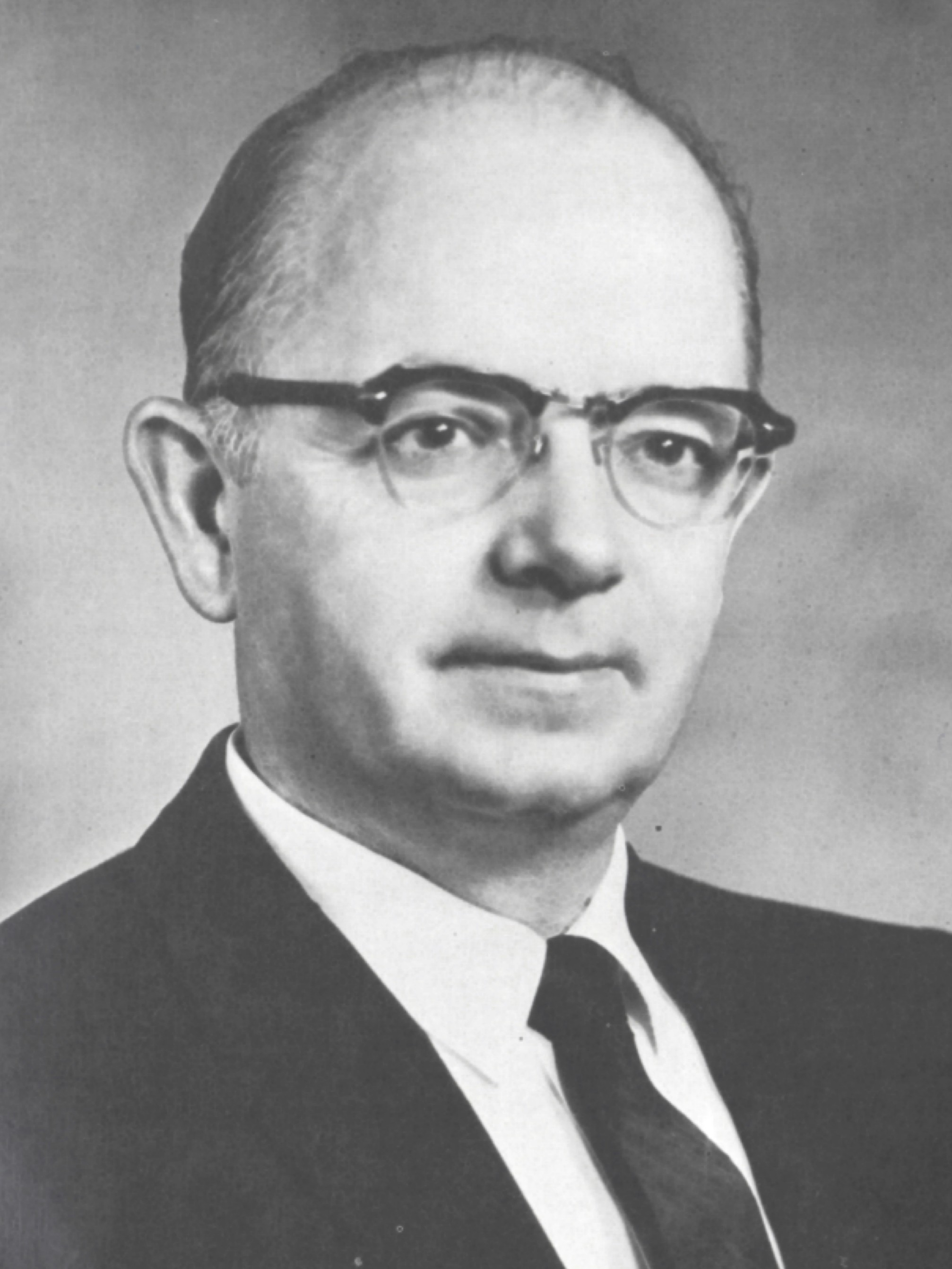

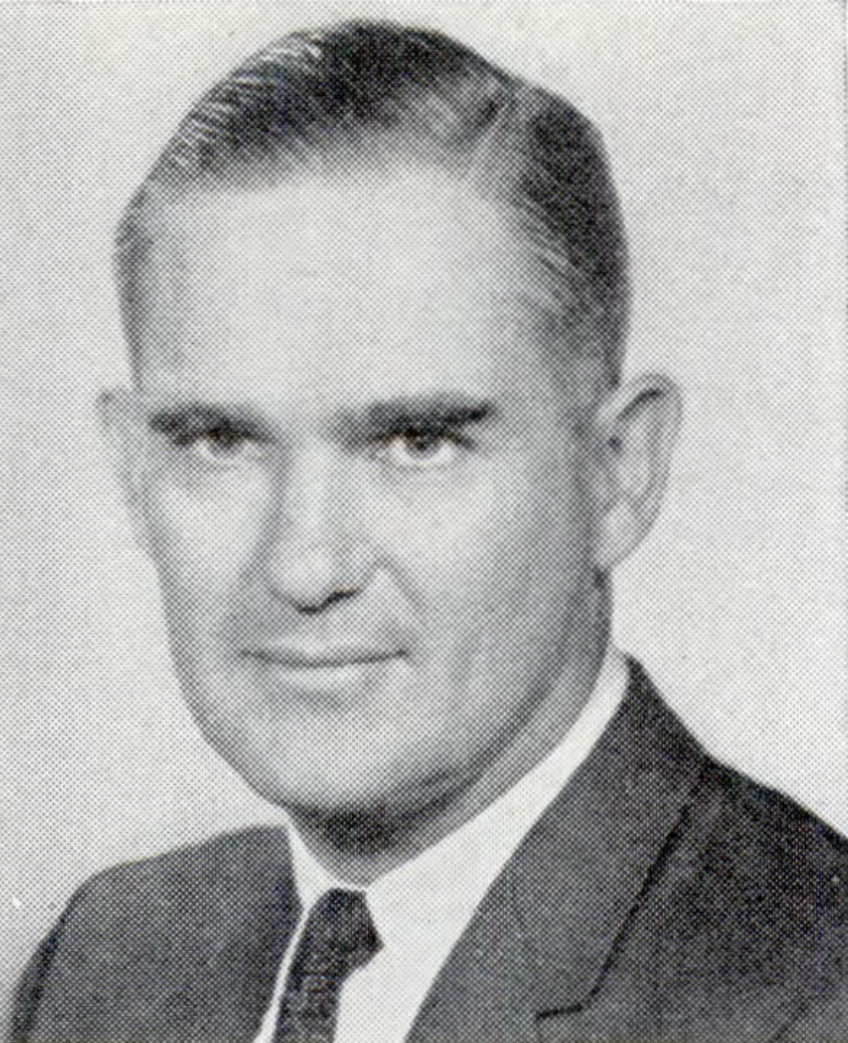

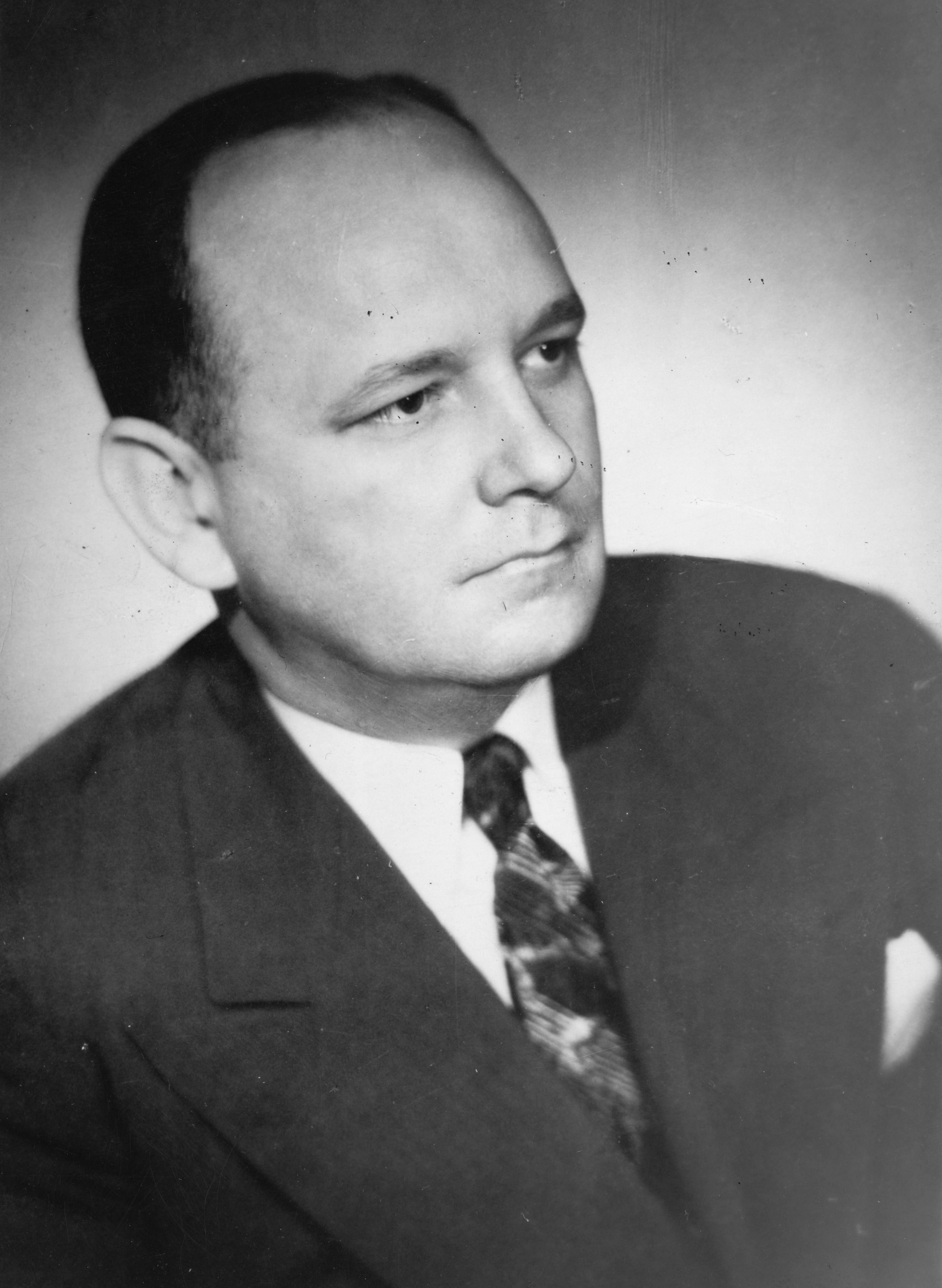
Nominee	Lester Maddox	Bo Callaway	Ellis Arnall (write-in)
Party	Democratic	Republican	Independent
Delegate count	182	66	–
Popular vote	450,626	453,665	69,025
Percentage	46.22%	46.53%	7.08%
- County results Maddox: 40–50% 50–60% 60–70% 70–80% 80–90% Callaway: 40–50% 50–60% 60–70% 70–80% Arnall: 30–40%
Governor before election
Carl Sanders
Democratic
Elected Governor
Lester Maddox
Democratic

The 1966 Georgia gubernatorial election was held in the U.S. state on November 8, 1966. After an election that exposed divisions within the Georgia Democratic Party (giving the Georgia Republican Party a shot at the Governor's Mansion for the first time in the twentieth century), segregationist Democrat Lester Maddox was elected Governor of Georgia. The voting also brought future President Jimmy Carter to statewide prominence for the first time. The election was the closest in Georgia gubernatorial history; Republican candidate Bo Callaway won a plurality of the popular vote, but lost the contingent election in the Georgia General Assembly to Maddox. It was also the first time since 1916 that the Republican Party contested a gubernatorial election. If Callaway had won the contingent election or a majority of the popular vote, he would have become the only Republican governor of Georgia in the 20th century.

As of 2022, this is the last time that Dougherty, Macon, Randolph, Richmond, Stewart, and Talbot counties voted for the Republican candidate for governor, and the last time that Liberty County did not vote for the Democratic candidate.

== Democratic nomination ==
Former Governor Ernest Vandiver was considered the favorite to return to his former job (although governors could not then succeed themselves, they could run again after leaving office), but he dropped out of the race because of health problems. That opened the door for former Governor Ellis Arnall, former Lieutenant Governor Garland T. Byrd, state Senator Jimmy Carter, and two segregationist businessmen, Lester Maddox and James H. Gray Sr., to run for the Democratic nomination.

Gray, a Massachusetts native, publisher of the Albany Herald and founder of what is now Gray Television, was a former Georgia Democratic state chairman who defended segregation in his northern accent before the 1960 Democratic National Convention in Los Angeles. In the primary race, Maddox had often called upon Gray to leave the race, having said that his opponent was "going down like the Titanic". Gray remained in the race and finished fourth in the primary. He declared neutrality in the Maddox-Arnall runoff election, not openly supporting either candidate. However, one of Gray's associates, Roy V. Harris of Augusta, a member of the Georgia State Board of Regents, supported Maddox over Arnall. Gray supporters attempted to entice Maddox to leave the race with a $100,000 payment. Gray denied involvement in the scheme but would not, on Maddox's request, take a lie detector test.

=== Candidates ===
==== Nominee ====
- Lester Maddox, businessman

==== Eliminated in runoff ====
- Ellis Arnall, former governor (1943–1947) and former attorney general of Georgia (1939–1943)

==== Eliminated in primary ====
- Garland T. Byrd, former lieutenant governor of Georgia (1959–1963)
- Jimmy Carter, state senator (1963–1967)
- James H. Gray Sr., businessman and founder of Gray Television
- Hoke O'Kelley

==== Withdrawn ====
- Ernest Vandiver, former governor (1959–1963) and former lieutenant governor of Georgia (1955–1959)

=== Democratic primary election results ===
Democratic primary results by county: Arnall: Arnall—20–30%; Arnall—30–40%; Arnall—40–50%; Arnall—50–60%; Arnall—60–70%; Arnall—70–80%; Maddox: Maddox—20–30%; Maddox—30–40%; Maddox—40–50%; Maddox—60–70%; Carter: Carter—30–40%; Carter—40–50%; Gray: Gray—20–30%; Gray—30–40%; Gray—40–50%; Gray—50–60%; Gray—60–70%; Gray—70–80%; Byrd: Byrd—50–60%

Democratic primary runoff results by county: Maddox: Maddox—50–60%; Maddox—60–70%; Maddox—70–80%; Maddox—80–90%; Maddox—<90%; Arnall: Arnall—50–60%; Arnall—60–70%; Arnall—70–80%; Arnall—80–90%

The primary was held on September 13, 1966.

Democratic primary results
Party	Candidate	Votes	%
Democratic	Ellis Arnall	231,480	29.38
Democratic	Lester Maddox	185,672	23.56
Democratic	Jimmy Carter	164,562	20.89
Democratic	James H. Gray	152,973	19.41
Democratic	Garland T. Byrd	39,994	5.08
Democratic	Hoke O'Kelley	13,271	1.7

Pursuant to Georgia law, as no candidate received a majority of votes in the primary, a runoff was held on September 27.

Democratic primary runoff results
Party	Candidate	Votes	%
Democratic	Lester Maddox	443,055	54.29
Democratic	Ellis Arnall	373,004	45.71

=== Lieutenant governor ===
State House Speaker George T. Smith was the Democratic nominee for Lieutenant Governor of Georgia, after he defeated incumbent Peter Zack Geer in the primary. He went on to win the general election.

== Republican nomination ==
The Republican nominee was U.S. Representative Bo Callaway. He was the first Republican Representative from Georgia since Reconstruction.

No other Republicans sought down-ballot constitutional offices. State Senator Holden Eugene "Gene" Sanders of DeKalb County, a moderate Republican, sought to run for lieutenant governor, but Callaway said that Sanders did not follow the proper procedures. The Republican strategy was to shun all other statewide races for fear that a full ticket would unify the Democrats. The Atlanta Journal, which ultimately endorsed Callaway, claimed that key Republicans were a clique who hoped to build the party from the governor's office. The Athens Daily News depicted traditional Georgia Republican leaders as "would-be politicians [who viewed the party as] personal property and who made no real effort to expand into a broad-based and effective political organization".

== General election results ==
Georgia gubernatorial election, 1966
Party	Candidate	Votes	%	±%
Republican	Bo Callaway	453,665	46.53%	N/A
Democratic	Lester Maddox	450,626	46.22%	▼53.73
Write-In	Ellis Arnall (write-in)	69,025	7.08%	N/A

Some people were unhappy with both major nominees and took the "Go Bo" of Callaway's campaign, expanding it to "Go Bo, and take Lester with you".

Under Georgia law at the time, the Georgia General Assembly would be required to hold a contingent election if no candidate received a majority of the popular vote. Persons opposed to the contingent election procedure filed an action in the United States District Court for the Northern District of Georgia, contending that a contingent election would violate the Equal Protection Clause of the Fourteenth Amendment to the United States Constitution. The three-judge federal district court declared the Georgia contingent procedure unconstitutional and void on November 17, 1966, but less than a month later, on December 12, 1966, the United States Supreme Court reversed, and the contingent election went forward.

Maddox was elected on the first ballot despite losing the popular vote by 0.31%.

Following this, Georgia law was changed in 1968 to also subject the governor’s office to the runoff election.
