= 1950 Georgia lieutenant gubernatorial election =

- November 7, 1950
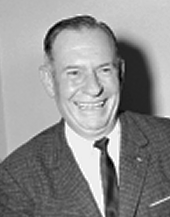
Nominee	Marvin Griffin
Party	Democratic
Popular vote	231,441
Percentage	100.00%
Lieutenant Governor before election
Marvin Griffin
Democratic
Elected Lieutenant Governor
Marvin Griffin
Democratic

The 1950 Georgia lieutenant gubernatorial election was held on November 7, 1950, in order to elect the lieutenant governor of Georgia. Democratic nominee and incumbent lieutenant governor Marvin Griffin ran unopposed and subsequently won the election.

== Democratic primary ==
The Democratic primary election was held on June 28, 1950. Candidate Marvin Griffin received a majority of the votes (57.30%), and was thus elected as the nominee for the general election.

=== Results ===
1950 Democratic lieutenant gubernatorial primary
Party	Candidate	Votes	%
Democratic	Marvin Griffin (incumbent)	324,871	57.30%
Democratic	Dan Duke	124,248	21.92%
Democratic	Frank C. Gross	117,841	20.78%
Total votes		566,960	100.00%

== General election ==
On election day, November 7, 1950, Democratic nominee and incumbent lieutenant governor Marvin Griffin ran unopposed and won the election with 231,441 votes, thereby retaining Democratic control over the office of lieutenant governor. Griffin was sworn in for his second term on January 3, 1951.

=== Results ===
Georgia lieutenant gubernatorial election, 1950
Party	Candidate	Votes	%
Democratic	Marvin Griffin (incumbent)	231,441	100.00
Total votes		231,441	100.00
Democratic hold			
