= 1970 Georgia lieutenant gubernatorial election =

- November 3, 1970
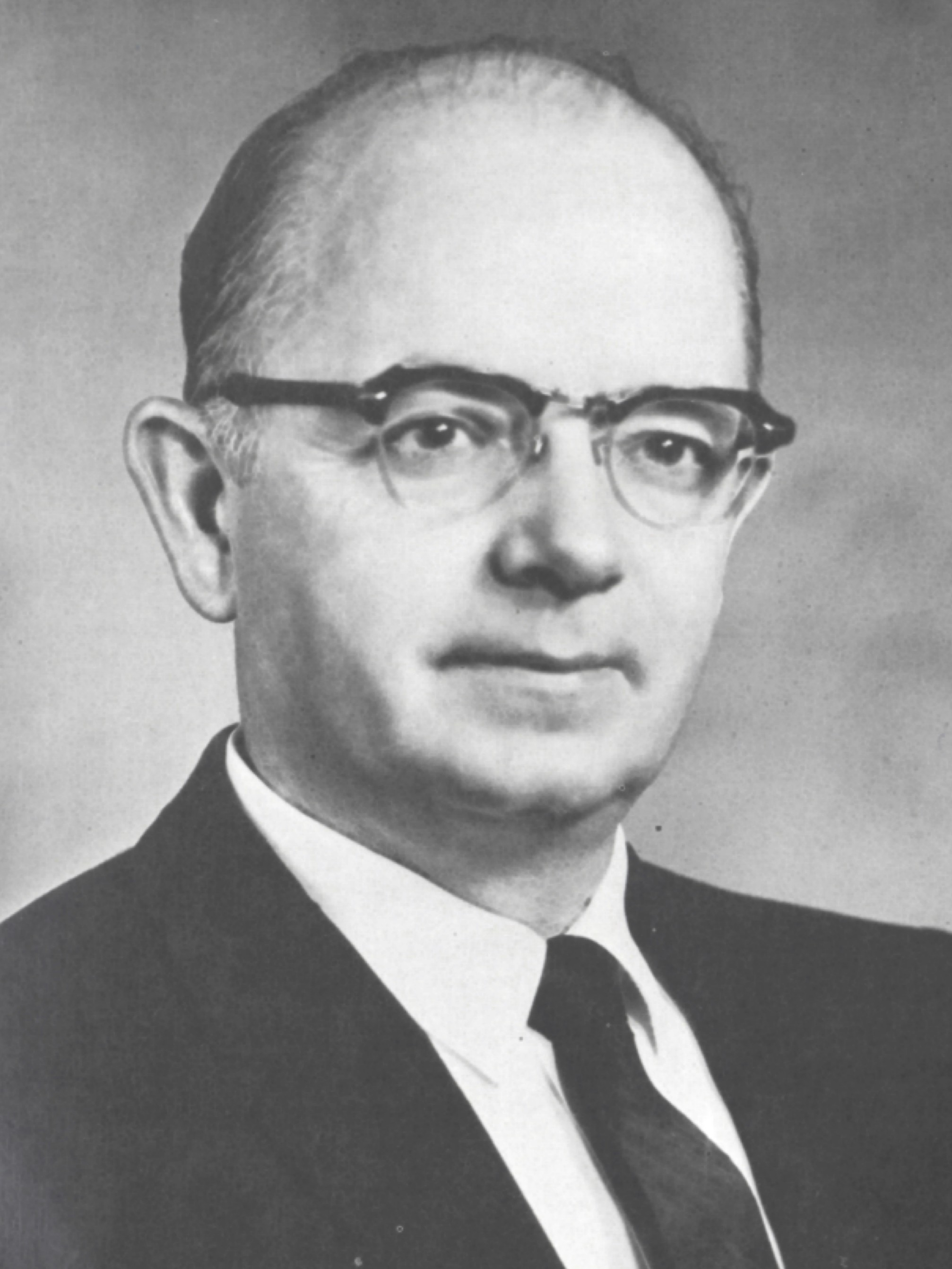

Nominee	Lester Maddox	Frank G. Miller
Party	Democratic	Republican
Popular vote	733,797	263,415
Percentage	73.59%	26.41%
- County results Maddox: 50–60% 60–70% 70–80% 80–90% >90% Miller: 50–60%
Lieutenant Governor before election
George T. Smith
Democratic
Elected Lieutenant Governor
Lester Maddox
Democratic

The 1970 Georgia lieutenant gubernatorial election was held on November 3, 1970, in order to elect the lieutenant governor of Georgia. Democratic nominee and incumbent governor of Georgia Lester Maddox defeated Republican nominee and incumbent member of the Georgia State Senate Frank G. Miller.

== Democratic primary ==
The Democratic primary election was held on September 9, 1970. Incumbent governor of Georgia Lester Maddox received a majority of the votes (51.36%), and was thus elected as the nominee for the general election against incumbent lieutenant governor George T. Smith.

=== Results ===
1970 Democratic lieutenant gubernatorial primary
Party	Candidate	Votes	%
Democratic	Lester Maddox	397,424	51.36%
Democratic	George T. Smith (incumbent)	253,738	32.79%
Democratic	C. M. Jones	81,613	10.55%
Democratic	D. F. Glover	40,993	5.30%
Total votes		773,768	100.00%

== Republican primary ==
The Republican primary election was held on September 9, 1970. Incumbent member of the Georgia State Senate Frank G. Miller received a majority of the votes (52.64%), and was thus elected as the nominee for the general election.

=== Results ===
1970 Republican lieutenant gubernatorial primary
Party	Candidate	Votes	%
Republican	Frank G. Miller	48,787	52.64%
Republican	Bob Brown	43,890	47.36%
Total votes		92,677	100.00%

== General election ==
On election day, November 3, 1970, Democratic nominee Lester Maddox won the election by a margin of 470,382 votes against his opponent Republican nominee Frank G. Miller, thereby retaining Democratic control over the office of lieutenant governor. Maddox was sworn in as the 7th lieutenant governor of Georgia on January 12, 1971.

=== Results ===
Georgia lieutenant gubernatorial election, 1970
Party	Candidate	Votes	%
Democratic	Lester Maddox	733,797	73.59
Republican	Frank G. Miller	263,415	26.41
Total votes		997,212	100.00
Democratic hold			
