= Jane Kidd (politician) =

American politician (born 1953)

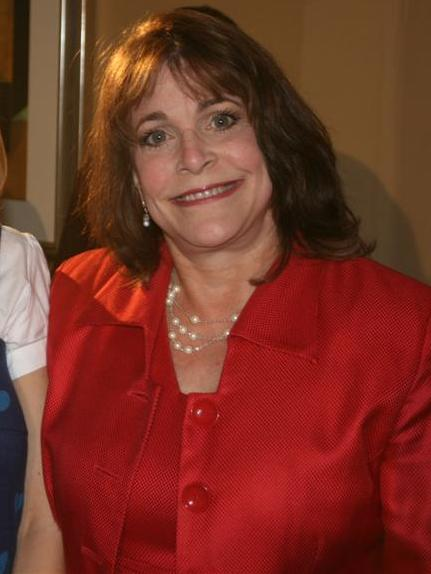
- Kidd in 2007

Chair of the Democratic Party of Georgia
- In office January 2007 – January 2011
- Preceded by: Bobby Kahn
- Succeeded by: Mike Berlon

Member of the Georgia House of Representatives from the 115th district
- In office January 10, 2005 – January 8, 2007
- Preceded by: Larry Walker
- Succeeded by: Doug McKillip

Personal details
- Born: Jane Brevard Vandiver; February 12, 1953 (age 73) Atlanta, Georgia, U.S.
- Party: Democratic
- Spouse: David Kidd (m. 1974)
- Children: 2
- Parent: Ernest Vandiver (father)
- Education: University of Georgia; Piedmont University

Jane Vandiver Kidd (born February 12, 1953) is a retired American politician from Georgia.

== Early life and family ==
Kidd was born Jane Brevard Vandiver on February 12, 1953, in Atlanta to Sybil Elizabeth "Betty" (née Russell; 1927–2018), a daughter of federal judge Robert Lee Russell, and Ernest Vandiver (1918–2005), an Army Air Forces veteran of World War II and former mayor of Lavonia, Georgia, who was serving as the state's adjutant general under Governor Herman Talmadge. Through her mother, she was a granddaughter of Richard Russell Sr., a former chief justice of the Supreme Court of Georgia, and a grandniece of U.S. Senator and former governor Richard Russell Jr. Her father successfully ran for lieutenant governor in the 1954 election, and subsequently, in the 1958 election, he was elected governor, serving in that position until 1963. Kidd attended Queens College (now Queens University of Charlotte) and graduated from the University of Georgia, where she received a bachelor's degree in journalism.

Kidd married David Alexander Kidd in 1974. The couple settled in Lavonia and had two children: Frances Elizabeth Kidd Hogan (born 1979) and David Alexander Kidd Jr. (born 1982).

== Career ==
Kidd started her career as a disc jockey at WNEG (AM) and later worked at the University of Georgia public television (WUGA-TV).

She worked at Clemson University in South Carolina, as a television and radio editor, and then returned to UGA to begin working as a national media relations director for several colleges and universities, and the MacArthur Foundation.

Kidd was elected in 1980 in Lavonia City Council, serving three two-year terms. In 1986, she moved to Athens, Georgia and worked for Gehrung Associates, as a media relations consultant for the Keene, NH firm. In 1992, she served as campaign manager for Don Johnson Jr.'s successful run for Congress, and served as his district director during his one term in Congress. In 1996, Kidd returned to UGA as fundraiser and alumni director for The State Botanical Garden of Georgia and the Grady College of Journalism. In 2004, Kidd ran for Georgia House of Representatives for the 115th district and won against Republican candidate Bill Cowsert, but after a single term in the House, lost her bid for Georgia Senate District 46 to Cowsert. Kidd was then elected chair of the Democratic Party of Georgia in 2007, which she would lead until 2011.

Kidd returned to higher education public relations in 2012 when she became Special Assistant to the President of Piedmont University in Demorest and Athens, Georgia. Kidd received a Masters in Media Technology in 2016 from Piedmont University. Kidd retired from Piedmont University in 2019.
