= 1962 Georgia gubernatorial election =

1962 Georgia Democratic gubernatorial primary
- September 12, 1962
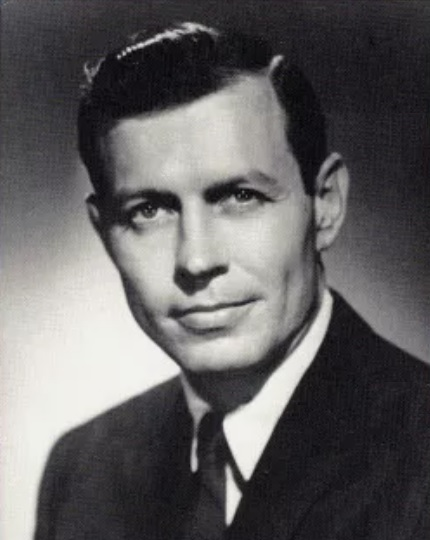

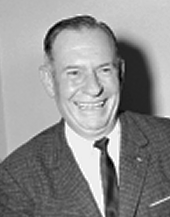
Nominee	Carl Sanders	Marvin Griffin
Party	Democratic	Democratic
Popular vote	494,978	332,746
Percentage	58.07%	39.04%
- County results Sanders: 40–50% 50–60% 60–70% 70–80% 80–90% Griffin: 40–50% 50–60% 60–70% 70–80% 80–90%
Governor before election
Ernest Vandiver
Democratic
Elected Governor
Carl Sanders
Democratic

The 1962 Georgia gubernatorial election was held on November 6, 1962.

Carl Sanders won the Democratic primary on September 12 with 58.07% of the vote, defeating former governor Marvin Griffin. At this time, Georgia was a one-party state, and the Democratic nomination was tantamount to victory. Sanders won the November general election without an opponent, the most recent such gubernatorial election in the United States.

This election was notable for a number of reasons. First, it was the last Georgia gubernatorial election to date where the Republican Party did not field a candidate. Second, the primary election was the first that took place under a winner-take-all system, as the previously used County Unit System had been struck down by the US Supreme Court in Gray v. Sanders. Finally, upon election, Carl Sanders became the youngest governor of a state at the time (aged 37) and the first governor from an urban area since the 1920s. He beat former governor Marvin Griffin in the Democratic primary.

== Democratic primary ==
=== Candidates ===
- Marvin Griffin, former governor of Georgia (1955–59)
- Cecil L. Langham
- Hoke O'Kelley, perennial candidate
- Carl Sanders, state senator from Augusta and President pro tempore of the Georgia Senate
- Grace Wilkey Thomas, candidate for governor in 1954 and desegregationist

=== Results ===
Georgia Democratic gubernatorial primary, 1962
Party	Candidate	Votes	%
Democratic	Carl Sanders	494,978	58.07
Democratic	Marvin Griffin	332,746	39.04
Democratic	Grace Wilkey Thomas	12,579	1.48
Democratic	Hoke O'Kelley	8,728	1.02
Democratic	Cecil L. Langham	3,319	0.39
Total votes		852,350	100.00

=== Endorsements ===
Carl Sanders

Individuals

- J. B. Fuqua, state senator

== General election results ==
1962 Georgia gubernatorial election
Party	Candidate	Votes	%	±%
Democratic	Carl Sanders	311,524	99.95%	▼0.05
N/A	write-ins	167	0.05%	▲0.05
Total votes		311,691	100.00%	
Democratic hold				
