= 2014 Georgia lieutenant gubernatorial election =

- November 4, 2014
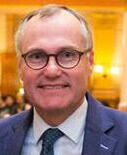

| Nominee | Casey Cagle | Connie Stokes |
| Party | Republican | Democratic |
| Popular vote | 1,466,505 | 1,062,557 |
| Percentage | 57.99% | 42.01% |
- County results Cagle: 50–60% 60–70% 70–80% 80–90% Stokes: 50–60% 60–70% 70–80% 80–90%
Lieutenant Governor before election
Casey Cagle
Republican
Elected Lieutenant Governor
Casey Cagle
Republican

The 2014 Georgia lieutenant gubernatorial election was held on November 4, 2014, in order to elect the lieutenant governor of Georgia. Republican nominee and incumbent lieutenant governor Casey Cagle defeated Democratic nominee and former member of the Georgia State Senate Connie Stokes.

== General election ==
On election day, November 4, 2014, Republican nominee Casey Cagle won re-election by a margin of 403,948 votes against his opponent Democratic nominee Connie Stokes, thereby retaining Republican control over the office of lieutenant governor. Cagle was sworn in for his third term on January 12, 2015.

=== Polling ===
| Poll source | Date(s) administered | Sample size | Margin of error | Casey Cagle (R) | Connie Stokes (D) | Undecided |
|---|---|---|---|---|---|---|
| Public Policy Polling | November 1–3, 2014 | 975 | ± 3.1% | 52% | 38% | 10% |
| Landmark Communications | November 2, 2014 | 1,500 | ± 2.5% | 54% | 42% | 5% |
| SurveyUSA | October 30 – November 2, 2014 | 591 | ± 4.1% | 54% | 38% | 9% |
| Landmark Communications | October 29, 2014 | 1,500 | ± 2.5% | 53% | 42% | 5% |
| SurveyUSA | October 24–27, 2014 | 611 | ± 4% | 52% | 41% | 7% |
| SurveyUSA | October 17–20, 2014 | 606 | ± 4.1% | 48% | 40% | 12% |
| SurveyUSA | October 10–13, 2014 | 563 | ± 4.2% | 49% | 42% | 9% |
| Landmark Communications | October 7–9, 2014 | 1,000 | ± 3.1% | 50% | 42% | 8% |
| SurveyUSA | October 2–6, 2014 | 566 | ± 4.2% | 51% | 39% | 10% |
| Public Policy Polling | October 2–5, 2014 | 895 | ± 3.3% | 48% | 37% | 16% |
| SurveyUSA | September 19–22, 2014 | 550 | ± 4.3% | 47% | 43% | 10% |
| Landmark Communications | September 9–11, 2014 | 1,109 | ± 2.9% | 50% | 41% | 9% |
| SurveyUSA | September 5–8, 2014 | 558 | ± 4.2% | 51% | 40% | 9% |
| SurveyUSA | August 14–17, 2014 | 560 | ± 4.2% | 53% | 36% | 12% |

=== Results ===
2014 Georgia lieutenant gubernatorial election
| Party | Candidate | Votes | % |
|---|---|---|---|
| Republican | Casey Cagle (incumbent) | 1,466,505 | 57.99 |
| Democratic | Connie Stokes | 1,062,557 | 42.01 |
| Total votes | | 2,529,062 | 100.00 |
| Republican hold | | | |
