= 1982 Georgia lieutenant gubernatorial election =

- November 2, 1982
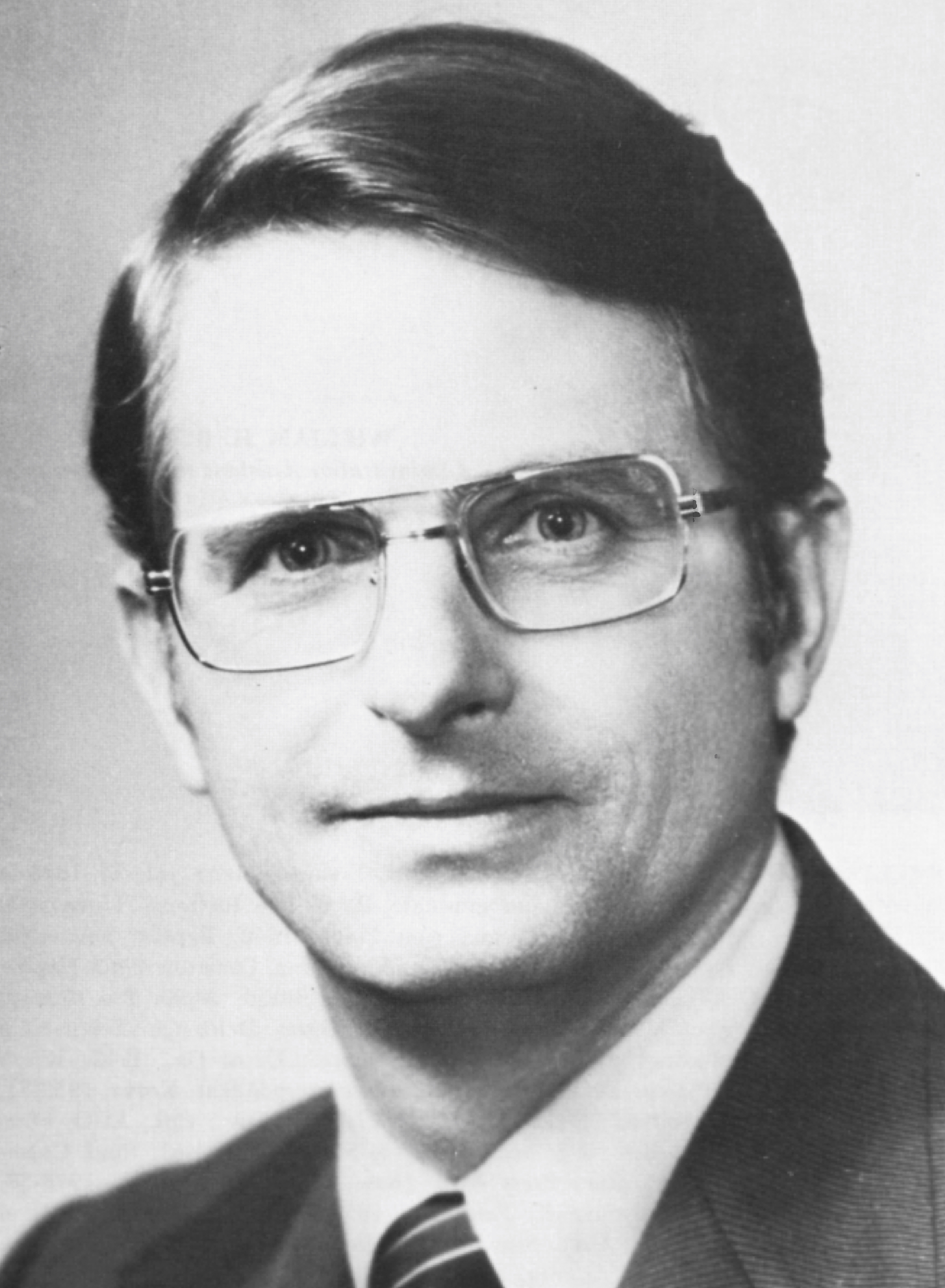

Nominee	Zell Miller	Franklin Sutton
Party	Democratic	Republican
Popular vote	797,245	294,499
Percentage	73.02%	26.97%
Lieutenant Governor before election
Zell Miller
Democratic
Elected Lieutenant Governor
Zell Miller
Democratic

The 1982 Georgia lieutenant gubernatorial election was held on November 2, 1982, in order to elect the lieutenant governor of Georgia. Democratic nominee and incumbent lieutenant governor Zell Miller defeated Republican nominee and incumbent member of the Georgia State Senate Franklin Sutton.

== Democratic primary ==
The Democratic primary election was held on August 10, 1982. Incumbent lieutenant governor Zell Miller received a majority of the votes (70.84%), and was thus elected as the nominee for the general election.

=== Results ===
1982 Democratic lieutenant gubernatorial primary
Party	Candidate	Votes	%
Democratic	Zell Miller (incumbent)	582,902	70.84%
Democratic	J. Mac Barber	166,107	20.19%
Democratic	Joe Smith	73,860	8.97%
Total votes		822,869	100.00%

== Republican primary ==
The Republican primary election was held on August 10, 1982. Incumbent member of the Georgia State Senate Franklin Sutton ran unopposed and was thus elected as the nominee for the general election.

=== Results ===
1982 Republican lieutenant gubernatorial primary
Party	Candidate	Votes	%
Republican	Franklin Sutton	50,913	100.00%
Total votes		50,913	100.00%

== General election ==
On election day, November 2, 1982, Democratic nominee Zell Miller won re-election by a margin of 502,746 votes against his opponent Republican nominee Franklin Sutton, thereby retaining Democratic control over the office of lieutenant governor. Miller was sworn in for his third term on January 3, 1983.

=== Results ===
Georgia lieutenant gubernatorial election, 1982
Party	Candidate	Votes	%
Democratic	Zell Miller (incumbent)	797,245	73.02
Republican	Franklin Sutton	294,499	26.97
Write-in		39	0.01
Total votes		1,091,783	100.00
Democratic hold			
