= 1916 Georgia gubernatorial election =

- November 7, 1916
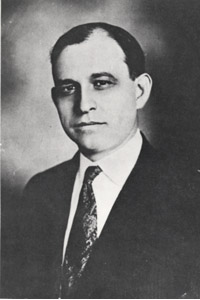

Nominee	Hugh Dorsey	Roscoe Pickett
Party	Democratic	Republican
Popular vote	139,772	4,217
Percentage	96.45%	2.91%
Governor before election
Nathaniel Edwin Harris
Democratic
Elected Governor
Hugh Dorsey
Democratic

The 1916 Georgia gubernatorial election was held on November 7, 1916, in order to elect the Governor of Georgia. Democratic nominee Hugh Dorsey overwhelmingly defeated Republican nominee Roscoe Pickett and Socialist party candidate Thomas M. Taylor. It was the first gubernatorial election to be contested by the Republican Party since 1876, and the last they would contest until 1966.

== General election ==
On election day, November 7, 1916, Democratic nominee Hugh Dorsey won the election by a margin of 135,555 votes against his foremost opponent Republican nominee Roscoe Pickett, thereby holding Democratic control over the office of Governor. Dorsey was sworn in as the 62nd Governor of Georgia (US State) on June 30, 1917.

=== Results ===
Georgia gubernatorial election, 1916
Party	Candidate	Votes	%
Democratic	Hugh Dorsey	139,772	96.45
Republican	Roscoe Pickett	4,217	2.91
Socialist	Thomas M. Taylor	921	0.64
Total votes		141,681	100.00
Democratic hold			
