= Steen Miles =

American politician

Member of the Georgia Senate from the 43rd district
- In office January 2005 – January 2007
- Preceded by: Connie Stokes
- Succeeded by: Ronald Ramsey

Personal details
- Born: Ollisteen Miles; August 20, 1946 South Bend, Indiana, U.S.
- Died: March 29, 2017 (aged 70) Decatur, Georgia, U.S.
- Party: Democratic
- Children: Kellie Jo King-Walker, Heather Lynn King-Bailey
- Education: Ball State University; Georgia State University

Ollisteen 'Steen' Miles (August 20, 1946 – March 29, 2017) was an American politician from the state of Georgia. A member of the Democratic Party, Miles was a former member of the Georgia State Senate. Sworn into office in 2005, Miles served on the Banking and Financial Institutions committee, as well as the Public Safety and Homeland Security, MARTOC, Special Judiciary, and State Institutions and Property Committees.

Miles was a former television newscaster, working for WXIA-TV. She ran for chief executive officer of DeKalb County, Georgia, in 2000 and 2008, losing both times. She also ran for Lieutenant Governor of Georgia in the 2006 election. In the 2014 primary, she ran unsuccessfully for the Democratic nomination for the open United States Senate seat created by Saxby Chambliss's retirement. Miles died on March 29, 2017.
