= 1978 Georgia lieutenant gubernatorial election =

- November 7, 1978
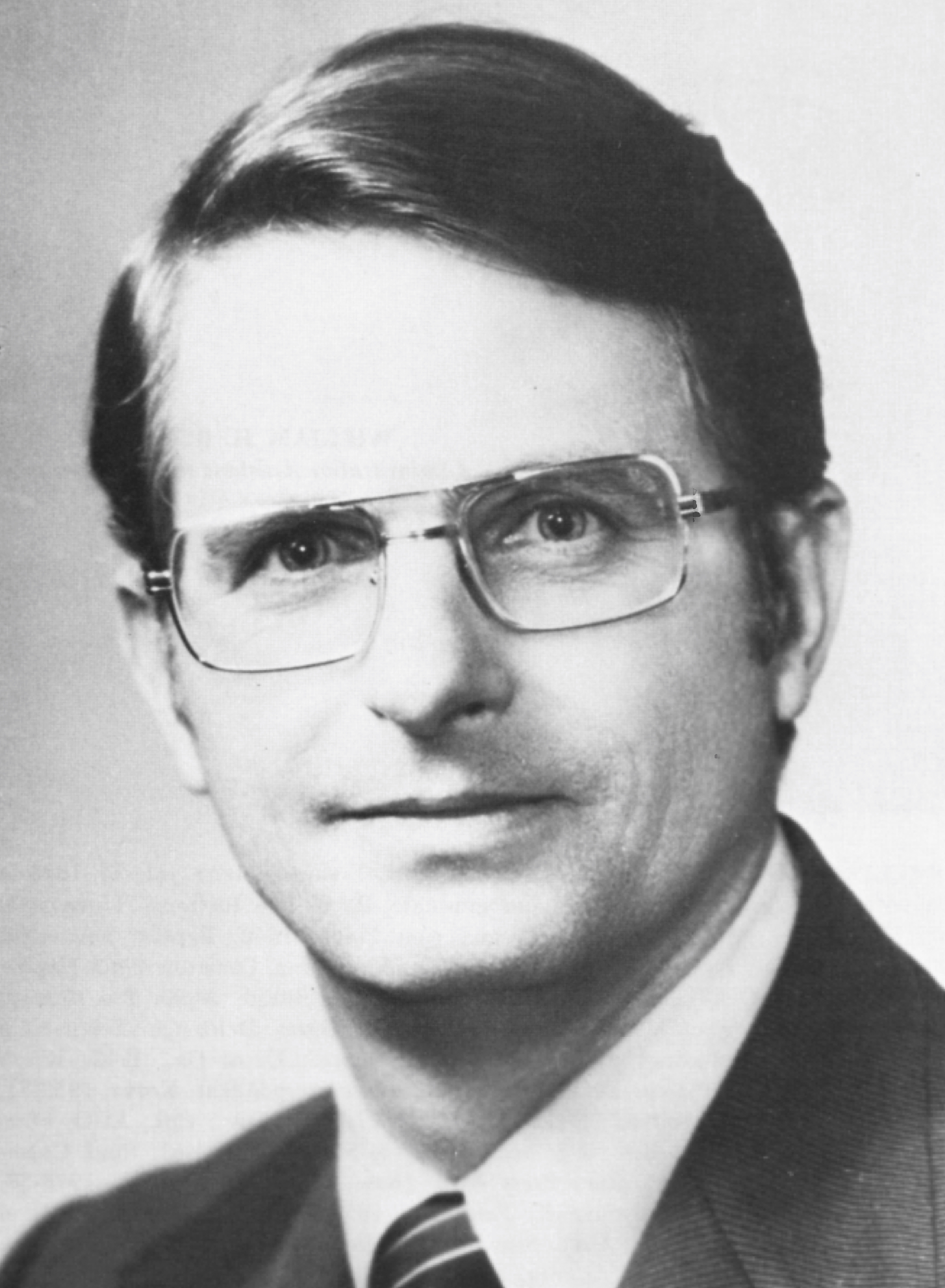

Nominee	Zell Miller	James W. Webb II
Party	Democratic	Republican
Popular vote	528,628	113,103
Percentage	82.37%	17.62%
Lieutenant Governor before election
Zell Miller
Democratic
Elected Lieutenant Governor
Zell Miller
Democratic

The 1978 Georgia lieutenant gubernatorial election was held on November 7, 1978, in order to elect the lieutenant governor of Georgia. Democratic nominee and incumbent lieutenant governor Zell Miller defeated Republican nominee James W. Webb II.

== Democratic primary ==
The Democratic primary election was held on August 8, 1978. Incumbent lieutenant governor Zell Miller received a majority of the votes (81.23%), and was thus elected as the nominee for the general election.

=== Results ===
1978 Democratic lieutenant gubernatorial primary
Party	Candidate	Votes	%
Democratic	Zell Miller (incumbent)	528,637	81.23%
Democratic	Sam G. Dickson	72,621	11.16%
Democratic	Frank E. Blankenship	49,534	7.61%
Total votes		650,792	100.00%

== General election ==
On election day, November 7, 1978, Democratic nominee Zell Miller won re-election by a margin of 415,525 votes against his opponent Republican nominee James W. Webb II, thereby retaining Democratic control over the office of lieutenant governor. Miller was sworn in for his second term on January 9, 1979.

=== Results ===
Georgia lieutenant gubernatorial election, 1978
Party	Candidate	Votes	%
Democratic	Zell Miller (incumbent)	528,628	82.37
Republican	James W. Webb II	113,103	17.62
Write-in		43	0.01
Total votes		641,774	100.00
Democratic hold			
