= 1986 Georgia lieutenant gubernatorial election =

1986 Georgia lieutenant gubernatorial Democratic gubernatorial election
- August 12, 1986
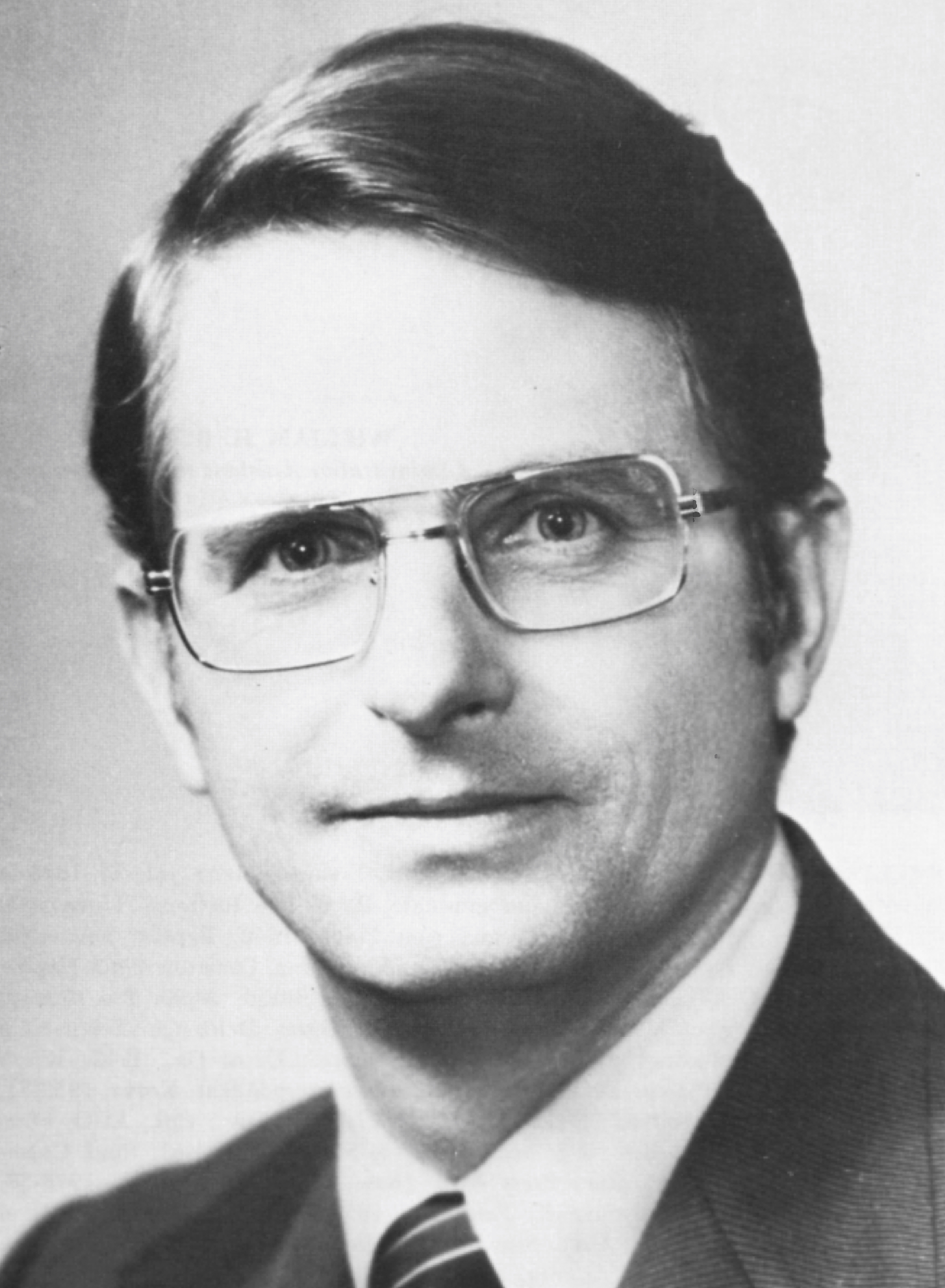

| Nominee | Zell Miller | Bobby L. Hill |
| Party | Democratic | Democratic |
| Popular vote | 495,346 | 102,928 |
| Percentage | 82.8% | 17.2% |
- County results Miller: 60–70% 70–80% 80–90%
Lieutenant Governor before election
Zell Miller
Democratic
Elected Lieutenant Governor
Zell Miller
Democratic

The 1986 Georgia lieutenant gubernatorial election was held on November 4, 1986, in order to elect the lieutenant governor of Georgia. Democratic nominee and incumbent lieutenant governor Zell Miller ran unopposed and subsequently won the election.

== Democratic primary ==
The Democratic primary election was held on August 12, 1986. Incumbent lieutenant governor Zell Miller received a majority of the votes (82.80%), and was thus elected as the nominee for the general election.

=== Results ===
1986 Democratic lieutenant gubernatorial primary
| Party | Candidate | Votes | % |
|---|---|---|---|
| Democratic | Zell Miller (incumbent) | 495,346 | 82.80% |
| Democratic | Bobby L. Hill | 102,928 | 17.20% |
| Total votes | | 598,274 | 100.00% |

== General election ==
On election day, November 4, 1986, Democratic nominee Zell Miller ran unopposed and won re-election with 871,259 votes, thereby retaining Democratic control over the office of lieutenant governor. Miller was sworn in for his fourth term on January 12, 1987.

=== Results ===
Georgia lieutenant gubernatorial election, 1986
| Party | Candidate | Votes | % |
|---|---|---|---|
| Democratic | Zell Miller (incumbent) | 871,259 | 99.99 |
| Write-in | | 72 | 0.01 |
| Total votes | | 871,331 | 100.00 |
| Democratic hold | | | |
