= Connie Stokes =

American politician (born 1953)

DeKalb County Commissioner
- In office 2004–2010

Member of the Georgia Senate from the 43rd district
- In office 1994–2004
- Succeeded by: Steen Miles

Personal details
- Born: September 3, 1953 (age 73) Atlanta, Georgia, U.S.
- Party: Democratic
- Children: 3
- Education: Art Institute of Atlanta; J. Mack Robinson College of Business, Georgia State University
- Occupation: real estate

Connie Stokes (born September 3, 1953) is an American politician from the state of Georgia. A member of the Democratic Party, she is a former DeKalb County Commissioner, and formerly served in the Georgia State Senate. Stokes ran for lieutenant governor in 2014.

== Early life and career ==
Stokes was born into poverty and abandoned by her mother, who was an alcoholic. Her great-grandmother raised her in Atlanta's Fourth Ward. She went into business in real estate.

== Political career ==
Stokes ran for the Georgia State Senate seat representing the 43rd district in 1994, receiving the endorsement of The Atlanta Journal-Constitution. She won, and was reelected five times. While she served in the Georgia Senate, Roy Barnes, the Governor of Georgia, appointed her to serve as one of his floor leaders. She also served as chairwoman of the Health and Human Services committee.

In 2004, Republicans won control of the Georgia Senate, and stripped Stokes of her committee leadership positions. As a result, she chose to run for Georgia's 4th congressional district in the United States House of Representatives, which was being vacated by Denise Majette, who was running for the United States Senate. She received an endorsement from Barnes, but lost the Democratic nomination to Cynthia McKinney, and was elected a DeKalb County commissioner that fall. She chaired the budget committee. In 2010, she challenged Hank Johnson for the House of Representatives, also representing Georgia's 4th congressional district, but Johnson won the nomination.

In 2013, Stokes declared her candidacy in the 2014 Georgia gubernatorial election. After Jason Carter entered the race, Stokes decided to run for lieutenant governor instead. She lost in the general election to incumbent Casey Cagle.

== Personal ==
Stokes received an Associate's degree from the Art Institute of Atlanta and a Bachelor of Business Administration from Georgia State University's J. Mack Robinson College of Business, with a major in marketing. She received a Masters in Public Administration, with a major in public management, from California State University, Dominguez Hills. She lives in Lithonia, Georgia, with her husband and three sons. She works as a business management consultant.

Party political offices
Preceded by Carol Porter	Democratic nominee for Lieutenant Governor of Georgia; 2014	Succeeded by Sarah Riggs Amico
