= George T. Smith =

American judge

George Thornewell Smith
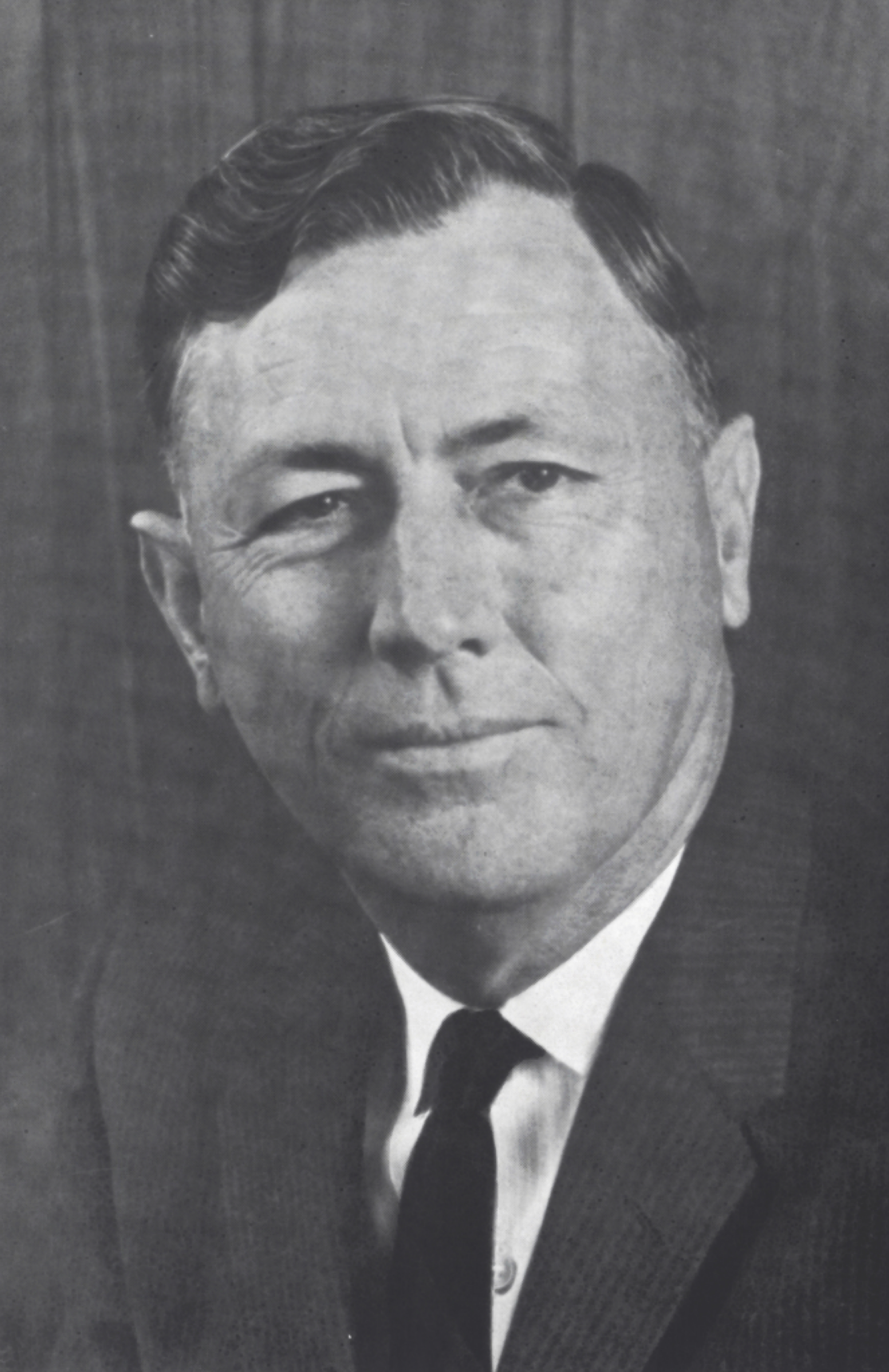

6th Lieutenant Governor of Georgia
- In office January 10, 1967 – January 13, 1971
- Governor: Lester Maddox
- Preceded by: Peter Zack Geer
- Succeeded by: Lester Maddox

Justice of the Supreme Court of Georgia
- In office 1981–1991

Judge of the Georgia Court of Appeals
- In office 1977–1981

Member of the Georgia House of Representatives
- In office January 12, 1959 – January 9, 1967

Personal details
- Born: October 15, 1916 Mitchell County, Georgia, US
- Died: August 23, 2010 (aged 93)
- Party: Democratic
- Education: Middle Georgia College; Abraham Baldwin Agricultural College; University of Georgia School of Law
- Profession: Lawyer

Military service
- Allegiance: United States
- Branch/service: United States Navy
- Rank: Lieutenant commander
- Battles/wars: World War II

George Thornewell Smith (October 15, 1916 – August 23, 2010) was an American Democratic Party politician and jurist from the state of Georgia. The sixth Lieutenant Governor, state legislator, Speaker of the State House of Representatives, was the only person in Georgia to win contested elections in all three branches of state government – legislative, executive, and judicial.

== Early years ==
Born in Mitchell County, Georgia, Smith attended Middle Georgia College and Abraham Baldwin Agricultural College. On August 26, 1940, he joined the United States Navy, having attained the rank of lieutenant commander and receiving the Naval Merit Unit citation. Following military service, Smith graduated from the University of Georgia School of Law in 1948.

Upon graduation he practiced law in Cairo in Grady County in southwestern Georgia. In addition to his private law practice, he served as county attorney, solicitor of the State Court of Grady County, Cairo city attorney, and attorney for the Grady County Board of Education.

== Political career ==
Smith's political career began when he was elected to the Georgia House of Representatives from Grady County in 1958. He served as a state representative until 1966, eventually rising to the position of its Speaker from 1963 to 1966.

Smith won the Democratic Party nomination for lieutenant governor in the 1966 election. Because the Georgia Democratic Party dominated state politics at the time, winning the primary virtually assured victory in the general election. Smith served as the state's second-ranking executive officer under Governor Lester Maddox from January 11, 1967 to January 12, 1971. Smith was defeated for re-election as lieutenant governor by Maddox in 1970, as Maddox was prohibited from seeking re-election to the governorship, which then passed to Jimmy Carter of Plains.

After leaving office, Smith returned to the legal world, initially in private practice in Marietta in suburban Cobb County near Atlanta. He ran unsuccessfully for governor in 1974, having lost his party nomination to George Busbee. In 1976, he was elected to the Georgia Court of Appeals for a six-year term. In 1980, he was elected as a justice of the Georgia Supreme Court. He served on the high court from 1981 until 1991. Despite his advanced age at the time of his death, Smith was serving on the Executive Committee of the Appellate Judges Conference.

Smith's likeness was unveiled in the rotunda of the State Capitol in Atlanta on May 12, 1980, in accordance with a Joint Resolution passed by the Georgia House and Senate.

Smith was also District Governor of the Georgia Kiwanis in 1960 and has served on the board of trustees of the National Arthritis Foundation and as chairman of its National Government Affairs Committee.

Smith was called "George T." to distinguish himself from a Georgia politician with a similar name, George L. Smith, who served as Speaker of the Georgia House during much of the 1960s and early 1970s.

== See also ==
- List of speakers of the Georgia House of Representatives

Party political offices
Preceded by Peter Zack Geer	Democratic nominee for Lieutenant Governor of Georgia; 1966	Succeeded by Lester Maddox
Political offices
Preceded by Peter Zack Geer	Lieutenant Governor of Georgia; 1967–1971	Succeeded by Lester Maddox
