= Garland T. Byrd =

American politician (1924–1997)

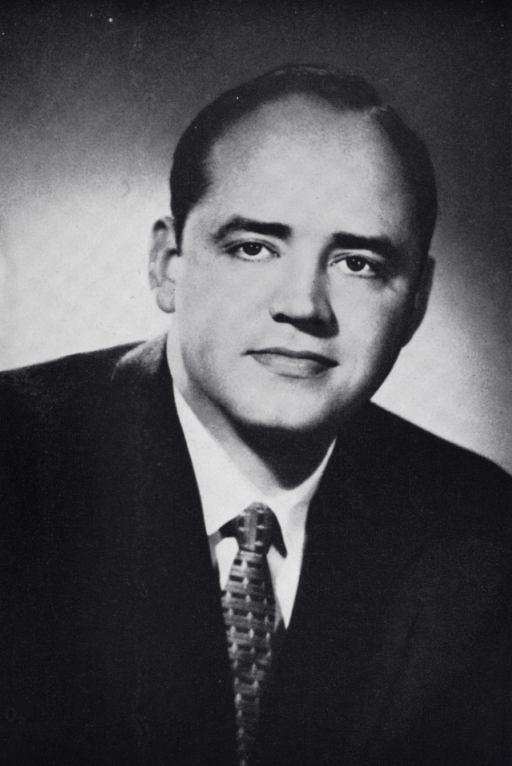

4th Lieutenant Governor of Georgia
- In office January 13, 1959 – January 15, 1963
- Governor: Ernest Vandiver
- Preceded by: Ernest Vandiver
- Succeeded by: Peter Zack Geer

Member of the Georgia House of Representatives from Taylor County
- In office January 13, 1947 – March 1949
- Preceded by: U. S. Underwood
- Succeeded by: D. E. Byrd

Personal details
- Born: Garland Turk Byrd; July 16, 1924 Reynolds, Georgia, U.S.
- Died: June 1, 1997 (aged 72) Reynolds, Georgia, U.S.
- Resting place: Hillcrest Cemetery, Reynolds, Georgia
- Party: Democratic
- Spouse: Gloria Elizabeth Whatley
- Education: University of Georgia; Emory University School of Law
- Profession: Farmer, real estate businessman

Military service
- Branch/service: United States Army
- Years of service: 1942–1945
- Rank: Captain
- Battles/wars: World War II; European theater

Garland Turk Byrd (July 16, 1924 – June 1, 1997) was United States Democratic politician from Georgia, who served as the fourth Lieutenant Governor of Georgia from 1959 to 1963, and as Senator from the 17th District in 1963-4.

He was born in Reynolds in Taylor County in west central Georgia. Byrd graduated in 1941 from Reynolds High School. During World War II he served in the United States Army from October 1942 to October 1945 in engineer combat units. He fought in Normandy, Northern France, Germany and Austria. He was discharged at the rank of captain.

Byrd attended University of Georgia at Athens from 1946 to 1948, where he was a member of Sigma Chi, and earned LL.B. degree from Emory University School of Law in 1948.

A lifelong farmer and real estate businessman, he served as a member of the Georgia House of Representatives from 1947 to 1949 from Taylor County. He resigned from the legislature to become director and then assistant director of the state's Veterans Service Department from 1949 to 1952.

Elected Lieutenant Governor in 1958 he served this post from January 13, 1959, to January 15, 1963, under fellow Democrat, Governor Ernest S. Vandiver Jr.

After he left the lieutenant governor's position, Byrd was Democratic nominee for U.S. Representative from Georgia's 3rd congressional district in 1964. However, he lost to Republican nominee (and 1966 gubernatorial standard-bearer nominee) Howard Callaway. Byrd hence was the first Georgia Democrat to lose to a Republican congressional candidate since the Reconstruction era.

In 1966, Byrd ran as a segregationist in the Democratic primary for governor to succeed the term-limited Carl Sanders but finished in a distant fifth place. In the heated runoff election, Byrd endorsed former Governor Ellis Arnall, considered the liberal candidate, who was defeated for the nomination by Lester Maddox of Atlanta, a segregationist who had closed his Pickrick Restaurant in 1964 to avoid serving African American customers. Maddox termed Byrd's support of Arnall "a sellout." The state legislature then elected Maddox over the Republican Howard Callaway when neither candidate obtained an outright majority of the vote in the general election, as was then required by the Georgia State Constitution.

Byrd was a Freemason. He was married to the former Gloria Elizabeth Whatley (born September 22, 1925). Byrd is interred at Hillcrest Cemetery in his native Reynolds, Georgia.

== Electoral history ==
Georgia's 3rd congressional district, 1964 (Democratic primary)

- Garland T. Byrd – 20,067 (34.38%)
- Stephen Pace Jr. – 13,492 (23.11%)
- Erle Cocke Jr. – 9,760 (16.72%)
- Ed Wohlwender – 8,526 (14.61%)
- Charles R. Adams – 4,242 (7.27%)
- Robert Lee Newby – 2,287 (3.92%)

Georgia's 3rd congressional district, 1964 (Democratic primary runoff)

- Garland T. Byrd – 22,584 (51.05%)
- Stephen Pace Jr. – 21,653 (48.95%)

Georgia's 3rd congressional district, 1964

- Howard Callaway (R) – 45,145 (57.23%)
- Garland T. Byrd (D) – 33,733 (42.77%)

Democratic gubernatorial primary, 1966

- Former Governor Ellis Arnall – 231,480 (29.38%)
- Lester Maddox – 185,672 (23.56%)
- State Senator Jimmy Carter – 185,672 (23.56%)
- James H. Gray – 164,562 (20.89%)
- Lieutenant Governor Garland T. Byrd – 39,994 (5.08%)
- Hoke O'Kelley – 13,271 (1.68%)

Political offices
Preceded by Ernest Vandiver	Lieutenant Governor of Georgia; 1959–1963	Succeeded by Peter Zack Geer
Party political offices
Preceded by Ernest Vandiver	Democratic Party nominee for Lieutenant Governor of Georgia; 1958 (won)	Succeeded by Peter Zack Geer
