= Melvin E. Thompson =

American politician (1903–1980)

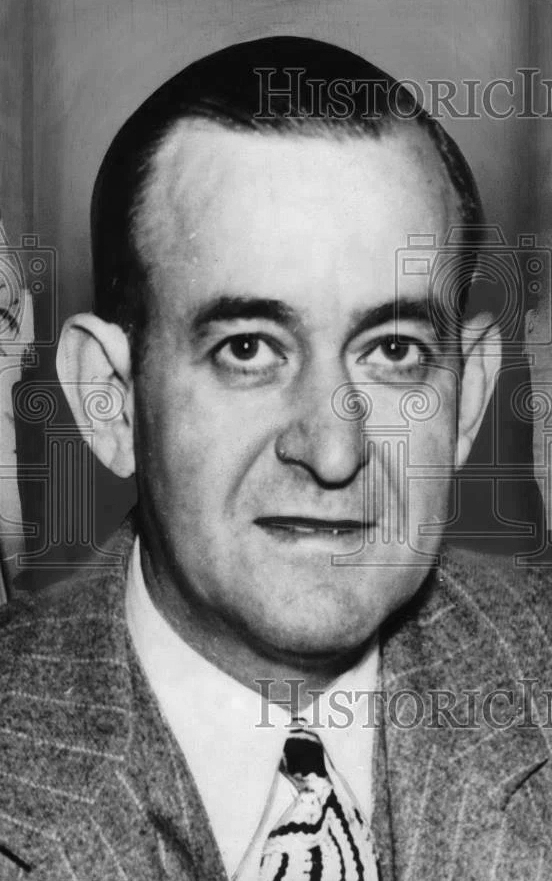
- Thompson c. 1947

70th Governor of Georgia
- In office January 18, 1947 – November 17, 1948
- Preceded by: Ellis Arnall
- Succeeded by: Herman Talmadge

1st Lieutenant Governor of Georgia
- In office January 14, 1947 – January 18, 1947
- Governor: Ellis Arnall
- Succeeded by: Marvin Griffin

Personal details
- Born: Melvin Ernest Thompson; May 1, 1903 Millen, Georgia, U.S.
- Died: October 3, 1980 (aged 77) Valdosta, Georgia, U.S.
- Resting place: McLane Riverview Memorial Gardens, Valdosta, Georgia, U.S.
- Party: Democratic
- Spouse: Dora Anne Newton (m. 1926)
- Children: 1
- Education: Emory University; University of Georgia (M.A.)

Melvin Ernest Thompson (May 1, 1903 – October 3, 1980) was an American educator and politician from Millen in the U.S. state of Georgia. Generally known as M.E. Thompson during his political career, he served as the 70th governor of Georgia from 1947 to 1948 and was elected as the first lieutenant governor in 1946.

== Early life and education ==
Thompson was born in Millen, Georgia, to Henry Jackson Thompson and his wife Eva Edenfield Thompson. He was the youngest of seven children and his father died just after his first birthday. His father was a sharecropper. Thompson grew up in poverty, but through hard work and determination, he was able to leave the farm to pursue a higher education. He helped pay his way through college by working various jobs, including student teaching and the selling of bibles door to door. He graduated from Emory University in 1926, then earned a Master of Arts (M.A.) from the University of Georgia in 1935. He also earned all of the credits for a Ph.D. from the University of Georgia, but because his adviser died, he never defended his dissertation. Following his college career, Thompson worked in education, first as a teacher and coach, a principal, a district superintendent, moving all the way up to assistant school superintendent for the state. Thompson was a supporter of Governor Ellis Arnall and was hired as his Executive Secretary. Arnall then appointed him to the position of State Revenue Commissioner in 1945.

== Family ==
Melvin Ernest Thompson married Dora Anne Newton, from Millen, Georgia, in 1926, and had one child, Melvin E. Thompson Jr., Melvin E. Thompson Jr. married Mary Bathsheba Carter and they had four children, Marianne Thea, Tarkenton Newton, Carter Maria and Melvin E. the 3rd. Melvin Jr. had a fifth child with his second wife Laura Mitchell, Charles Thompson.

== Three governors controversy ==
In 1946, Thompson ran for and won the newly-created office of Lieutenant Governor of Georgia. Following Thompson's election, Governor-elect Eugene Talmadge died on December 21, 1946, and the Georgia State Constitution was vague on who would be sworn in as governor, causing the three governors controversy. Thompson felt that as the Lieutenant Governor-elect, he should become the Governor. Arnall felt he should continue being governor even though he lost the election. Herman E. Talmadge (Eugene's son), and current senator at the time, tried to claim the office as well. He even arrived at the state capital with a gun tucked in his belt. He then had the locks changed to stop Arnall and Thompson from entering. The state legislature, controlled by Talmadge supporters, invoked a clause in the constitution allowing the legislature to pick between the second- and third-place candidates. The people who finished second and third were two write-in candidates, Herman E. Talmadge and James V. Carmichael. The legislature elected Herman Talmadge as governor based on write-in votes he producted from his house that were later proven fraudulent which stripped him of his governorship. Arnall later renounced his claim to support Thompson on January 18, 1947.

== 70th Governor of Georgia ==
On March 1947, the Supreme Court of Georgia ruled that Thompson was the legitimate governor and that the legislature had violated the state constitution by selecting Talmadge. Talmadge then cede the office to Thompson. Thompson's numerous achievements in his brief period as Governor include much needed improvements to highway infrastructure, public education, and the purchase of Jekyll Island, a beach retreat for the average Georgian. He was able to raise the salary of teachers, provide free books to students, and extend high school to the 12th grade. His purchase of Jekyll Island for $675,000 is still considered one of the greatest real estate purchases in U.S. history. Thompson was able to achieve many things during his shortened term, with very limited cooperation from the state legislature, and without raising taxes on the citizens of Georgia.

The resolution of the "three governors controversy" included holding a special election in 1948 for the remainder of Eugene Talmadge's term. Thompson lost the special primary to Herman Talmadge.

== Later political activities ==
Thompson unsuccessfully opposed Talmadge three additional times, twice in gubernatorial elections in 1950 and 1954 and finally in 1956 for one of Georgia's United States Senate seats. In the mid-1950s, Thompson moved to Valdosta, Georgia, where he transitioned into a successful career as a real estate developer. Thompson died at the age of 77 on October 3, 1980, in Valdosta. His family turned down an offer for him to lie in state, in the rotunda of the State Capitol. He is interred in a mausoleum at McLane Riverview Memorial Gardens, in Valdosta.

== Highway dedication ==
In 2013 the Georgia Legislature by House Resolution 47 By: Representatives Shaw of the 176th, Carter of the 175th, Black of the 174th, Sharper of the 177th, and Houston of the 170th named a portion of Interstate 75 in Lowndes County from the West Hill Avenue exit to the North Valdosta Road exit is dedicated as the Governor Melvin Ernest Thompson Memorial Highway.[House Resolution 47 By: Representatives Shaw of the 176th, Carter of the 175th, Black of the 174th, Sharper of the 177th, and Houston of the 170th].

Party political offices
First	Democratic nominee for Lieutenant Governor of Georgia; 1946	Succeeded by Marvin Griffin
Political offices
Preceded by New Office	Lieutenant Governor of Georgia; 1947	Succeeded by Marvin Griffin
Preceded by Herman Talmadge	Governor of Georgia; 1947–1948	Succeeded by Herman Talmadge
