= Peter Zack Geer =

American politician

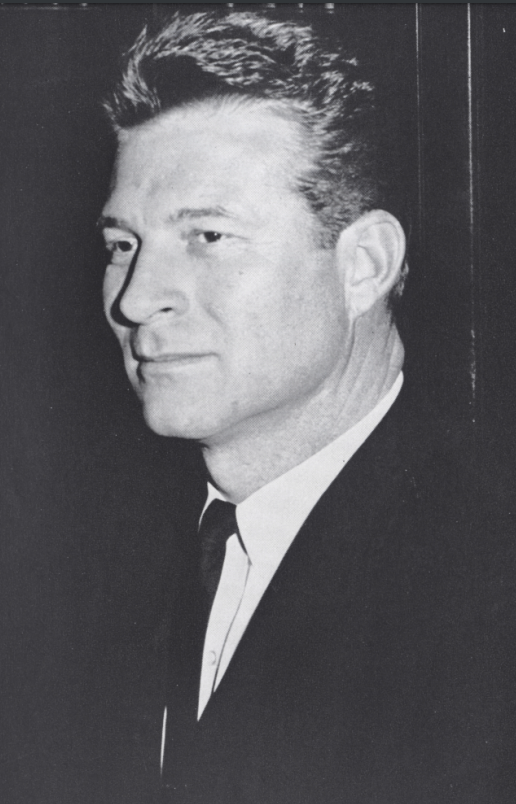

5th Lieutenant Governor of Georgia
- In office January 15, 1963 – January 11, 1967
- Governor: Carl Sanders
- Preceded by: Garland T. Byrd
- Succeeded by: George T. Smith

Personal details
- Born: August 24, 1928 Colquitt, Georgia, US
- Died: January 5, 1997 (aged 68) Colquitt, Georgia, US
- Resting place: Colquitt City Cemetery
- Party: Democratic
- Education: Oglethorpe University; Walter F. George School of Law
- Profession: Lawyer

Peter Zack Geer (August 24, 1928 – January 5, 1997) was an American lawyer and a Democratic politician from the U.S. state of Georgia.

Geer was born in Colquitt in Miller County in southwestern Georgia. In 1951 he graduated from the Walter F. George School of Law at Mercer University in Macon and became a prominent attorney. After service as a member of the Georgia House of Representatives, Geer was the fifth Lieutenant Governor of Georgia from 1963 to 1967 under his fellow Democrat, Governor Carl Sanders. To win the lieutenant governorship, Geer defeated in the 1962 primary runoff his fellow segregationist and later Governor Lester Maddox, a restaurateur from Atlanta, by a margin of 55 to 45 percent.

In his last act in office in January 1967, Geer presided over the legislative vote in the deadlocked gubernatorial race between Democrat Maddox and Republican U.S. Representative Howard Callaway. The impasse resulted because former Governor Ellis Arnall, an Atlanta lawyer, polled more than 52,000 ballots as a write-in candidate. Under the 1824 Georgia State Constitution, the legislature was required to choose between Callaway and Maddox as the top two candidates. Though Geer supported Maddox and ordered all legislators to vote, eleven lawmakers, including the African American Representative Julian Bond, refused to do so. The heavily Democratic assembly nevertheless voted 182 to 66 for Maddox. As Maddox took office, George Thornewell Smith succeeded Geer as lieutenant governor.

Geer then returned to the practice of law. In 1973, Geer prosecuted four men accused of slaying six Alday family members in Seminole County, Georgia. Geer obtained convictions and death sentences for the three principal defendants, although the convictions were later overturned because of pre-trial publicity which was held to have unduly prejudiced the jury. Later U.S. President Jimmy Carter, then the governor of Georgia, called the mass murder "the most heinous in Georgia history".

Geer died of cancer at the Miller County Hospital in Colquitt and was buried in the city cemetery.

Party political offices
Preceded by Garland T. Byrd	Democratic nominee for Lieutenant Governor of Georgia; 1962	Succeeded by George T. Smith
Political offices
Preceded by Garland T. Byrd	Lieutenant Governor of Georgia; 1963–1967	Succeeded by George T. Smith
