= Ernest Vandiver =

American politician from Georgia (1918–2005)

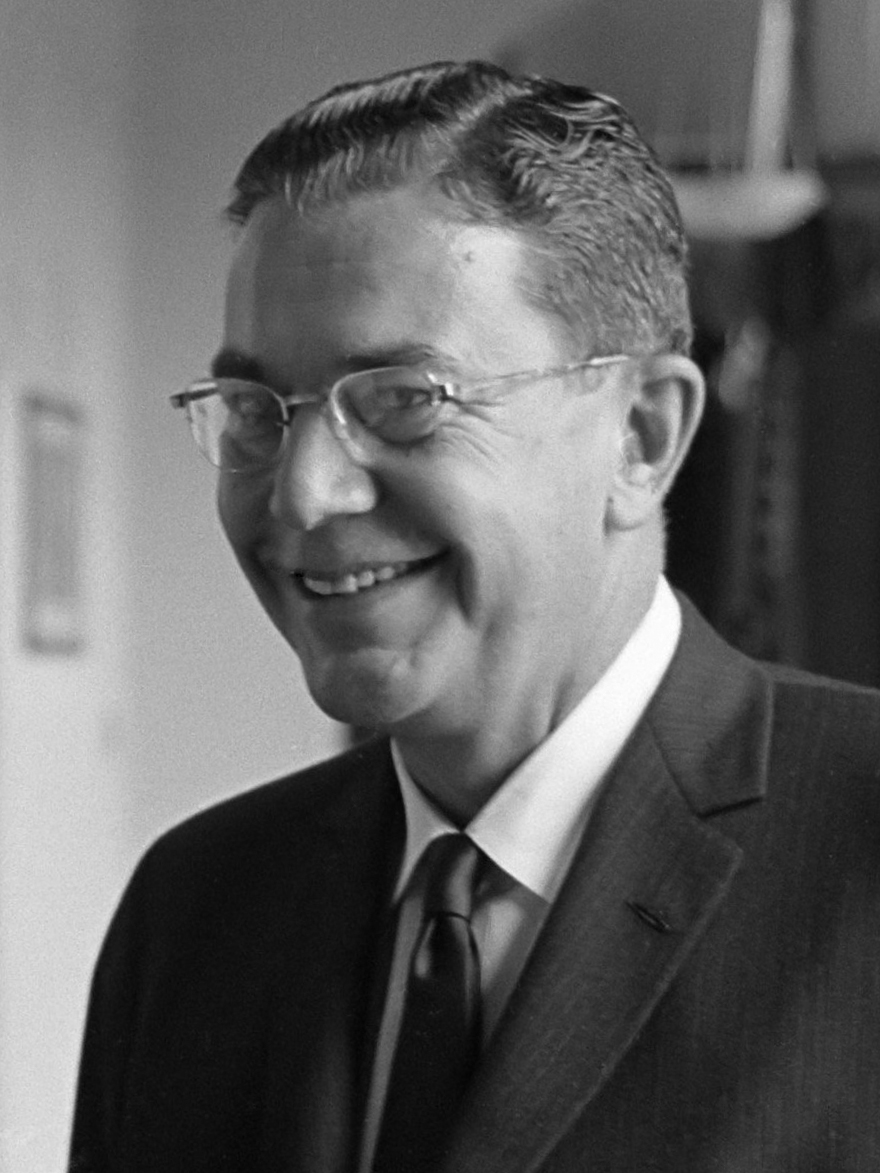
- Ernest Vandiver (1962)

73rd Governor of Georgia
- In office January 13, 1959 – January 15, 1963
- Lieutenant: Garland T. Byrd
- Preceded by: Marvin Griffin
- Succeeded by: Carl Sanders

3rd Lieutenant Governor of Georgia
- In office January 11, 1955 – January 13, 1959
- Governor: Marvin Griffin
- Preceded by: Marvin Griffin
- Succeeded by: Garland T. Byrd

Adjutant General of Georgia
- In office November 17, 1948 – June 20, 1954
- Governor: Herman Talmadge
- Preceded by: Alpha A. Fowler Jr.
- Succeeded by: George J. Hearn

Personal details
- Born: Samuel Ernest Vandiver Jr. July 3, 1918 Canon, Georgia, U.S.
- Died: February 21, 2005 (aged 86) Lavonia, Georgia, U.S.
- Party: Democratic
- Spouse: Betty Russell (m. 1947)
- Children: 3, including Jane V. Kidd
- Education: University of Georgia (AB, LLB)
- Occupation: Lawyer; farmer; banker; politician

Military service
- Branch/service: United States Army; Army Air Forces
- Battles/wars: World War II; American theater

Samuel Ernest Vandiver Jr. (July 3, 1918 – February 21, 2005) was an American Democratic Party politician who was the 73rd governor of Georgia from 1959 to 1963.

== Early life and career ==
Vandiver was born in Canon, in Franklin County in northeastern Georgia. He was the only child of Vanna Bowers and Samuel Ernest Vandiver. His mother had two children from a previous marriage, which ended with the death of her first husband. Vandiver's father was a prominent businessman, farmer, and landowner in Franklin County. Vandiver attended public schools in Lavonia and the Darlington School in Rome, Georgia. He graduated from the University of Georgia and the University of Georgia School of Law, both in Athens. He was a member of the Phi Kappa Literary Society.

After stateside service as an officer in the United States Army Air Forces during World War II, he was elected mayor of Lavonia in Franklin County in 1946. That same year, he supported Eugene Talmadge's candidacy for governor and then Herman Talmadge's claim to the office after Eugene's death.

In 1948, Talmadge appointed Vandiver as the state's adjutant general. In 1954, Vandiver was elected lieutenant governor.

He ran for governor in 1958 and promised to restore the state's image, which had been tarnished by scandals under Governor Marvin Griffin, under whom he had served as lieutenant governor. Vandiver was overwhelmingly elected. He succeeded Griffin as governor.

== Governor of Georgia ==
As governor, Vandiver cleaned up the corruption and mismanagement associated with the Griffin administration. He had pledged to defend segregation, using the campaign motto, "No, not one," meaning not one black child in a white school.

During the presidential election of 1960, Vandiver supported John F. Kennedy, but not fully. Vandiver favored "independent" electors. This led to the erosion of the Democratic party in the South, and southern resistance to the civil rights movement. In March 1960, Vandiver called "An Appeal for Human Rights", an article published in the Atlanta Constitution by black students at Spelman College, "an anti-American document" that "does not sound like it was written in this country". Vandiver worked behind the scenes with Kennedy and his brother Robert and ultimately played a role in obtaining the release of Martin Luther King Jr. from jail. King had been arrested during a sit-in at Rich's in Atlanta on October 19, 1960.

Vandiver on Dr. Martin Luther King Jr.

I got a call from then-Senator John Kennedy. This was during the campaign. He said, “A judge down in Georgia has incarcerated Martin Luther King. Is there anything that you can do to help get him out? Because it will be helpful to my career.” You may or may not know that Daddy King was supporting Nixon at that time. . . . So I called my brother-in-law and a close friend of mine who had been secretary of state when I was lieutenant governor. His name was George Stewart. George Stewart went out and talked with Judge Mitchell. Judge Mitchell agreed, and I do not know what George told the man. He might have told him that he would get him appointed federal judge or something. Anyway, he agreed that if either Senator Kennedy or Bobby Kennedy would call him personally and ask him to release Dr. King, that he would release him. I called Bobby Kennedy and relayed the message that George Stewart had brought back to me. Bobby Kennedy called Judge Mitchell, and Martin Luther King was released from jail.

— Ernest Vandiver, Saving The Soul of Georgia : Donald L. Hollowell and the Struggle For Civil Rights

Vandiver changed from his "No, not one" stance on segregation. Those urging him to change included Ivan Allen Jr. (later mayor of Atlanta), banker Mills B. Lane, Coca-Cola President Robert Woodruff, Griffin Bell (later a judge of the United States Court of Appeals for the Fifth Circuit and the United States Attorney General under U.S. President Jimmy Carter), and many others.

Following the assassination of John F. Kennedy, Vandiver said, "All the world is shocked and grieved at the death of our President. I am certain that all Georgians join together in sending our condolences to the grieved family."

Under Vandiver's administration, a United States District Court ordered the admission of two African-American students, Hamilton E. Holmes and Charlayne Hunter, to the University of Georgia. Despite his past support for segregation, Governor Vandiver did not resist the court order, sparing the University of Georgia the national publicity associated with the opposition stands taken in 1962 by Governor Ross Barnett at the University of Mississippi and in 1963 by Governor George C. Wallace at the University of Alabama. After the desegregation of the University of Georgia, Vandiver successfully urged the Georgia General Assembly to repeal a recently passed law barring state funding to integrated schools. He also appointed banker John A. Sibley to head a state commission designed to prepare for the court-ordered school desegregation.

He pledged to maintain the county unit system, a type of electoral college that had been employed to elect Georgia governors, but it was struck down by a decision of the United States Supreme Court as unconstitutional. He then ordered the Democratic State Central Committee to conduct the 1962 primary by popular vote.

Vandiver's efficiency in running state government permitted a building program and the expansion of state services without tax increases. The state expanded its ports, encouraged tourism, promoted business and industry, expanded vocational-technical education, and authorized programs for the mentally ill.

== Later career ==
In 1966, Vandiver was initially a candidate for governor and had been expected to compete with another former governor, Ellis Arnall. However, Vandiver withdrew for health reasons. When the Democratic nomination went not to Arnall but to the Atlanta businessman Lester Maddox, a strong segregationist, the Democrat Vandiver endorsed in the general election the Republican nominee, U.S. Representative Howard "Bo" Callaway, then of Pine Mountain. Maddox was ultimately elected by the Georgia legislature after election returns failed to produce a winner by majority vote.

Had Vandiver's health permitted him to run for governor in 1966, Callaway would have instead sought reelection to the U.S. House. When Vandiver looked like a potential Democratic nominee, Callaway asked William R. Bowdoin Sr. (1913–1996), an Atlanta banker and civic figure who had chaired a commission on state government reorganization, to run as a Republican gubernatorial candidate. Oddly, Carl Sanders, the term-limited governor, asked Bowdoin to run that year as a Democrat.

In 1972, at the age of fifty-four, Vandiver ran for the United States Senate for a full term to replace his wife's uncle, veteran Senator Richard Russell Jr., who had died in office in 1971. Vandiver finished third behind Sam Nunn and appointed Senator David H. Gambrell in the Democratic primary election. Nunn defeated the Republican Fletcher Thompson, an Atlanta-area U.S. representative even as Richard M. Nixon was sweeping Georgia in the presidential election against the Democrat George S. McGovern.

In his final years, Vandiver would express regret at his earlier segregationist positions. "I said a lot of intemperate things back then that I now have to live with," he said in 2002. "All I can say now is that you are of your time."

== Marriage and the Russell family ==
Vandiver was married to Sybil Elizabeth "Betty" Russell, a niece of Senator Russell, who had also served earlier as governor. Russell was popular and powerful in Georgia and helped to promote his nephew-in-law's career.

Vandiver was a son in law of Judge Robert Lee Russell and grandson-in-law of Judge Richard Russell Sr. For information, see Russell family.

== Death ==
Ernest Vandiver died on February 21, 2005, at the age of 86 at his home in Lavonia, Georgia. In addition to his wife, he was survived by three children: Samuel Ernest "Chip" Vandiver, III; Vanna Elizabeth (named for her paternal grandmother and mother) Vandiver; and Jane Brevard Vandiver, who as Jane V. Kidd was elected as a member of the Georgia House of Representatives from Athens and in 2007 as the chairman of the Georgia Democratic Party.

== Memorials ==
The stretch of I-85 through Franklin County, Georgia, is named "Ernest Vandiver Highway" in his memory. Vandiver had worked to make sure the highway traversed Franklin County, instead of proceeding further north as originally planned.

On September 26, 2008, the University of Georgia dedicated a residence hall in the East Campus Village to Vandiver.

Party political offices
Preceded by Marvin Griffin	Democratic nominee for Lieutenant Governor of Georgia; 1954	Succeeded by Garland T. Byrd
Preceded by Marvin Griffin	Democratic nominee for Governor of Georgia; 1958	Succeeded by Carl Sanders
Political offices
Preceded by Marvin Griffin	Lieutenant Governor of Georgia; 1955–1959	Succeeded by Garland T. Byrd
Preceded by Marvin Griffin	Governor of Georgia; 1959–1963	Succeeded by Carl Sanders
