= Marvin Griffin =

American politician (1907–1982)

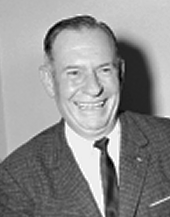

72nd Governor of Georgia
- In office January 11, 1955 – January 13, 1959
- Lieutenant: Ernest Vandiver
- Preceded by: Herman Talmadge
- Succeeded by: Ernest Vandiver

2nd Lieutenant Governor of Georgia
- In office November 17, 1948 – January 11, 1955
- Governor: Herman Talmadge
- Preceded by: Melvin E. Thompson
- Succeeded by: Ernest Vandiver

Member of the Georgia General Assembly
- In office 1934–1936

Personal details
- Born: Samuel Marvin Griffin; September 4, 1907 Bainbridge, Georgia, U.S.
- Died: June 13, 1982 (aged 74) Georgia, U.S.
- Party: Democratic
- Spouse(s): Mary Elizabeth "Lib" Smith; Laura Jane Gibson "Lollie"
- Children: Patricia Ann Griffin (daughter); Samuel Marvin Griffin Jr. (son)
- Education: The Citadel
- Profession: Newspaper publisher

Military service
- Allegiance: United States
- Branch/service: United States Army
- Years of service: 1941–1947
- Rank: Brigadier general
- Unit: Georgia National Guard
- Commands: Adjutant General of Georgia
- Battles/wars: World War II

Samuel Marvin Griffin, Sr. (September 4, 1907 – June 13, 1982) was an American politician from the U.S. state of Georgia.

A lifelong Democrat, Griffin was a native of Bainbridge, Georgia and publisher of the Bainbridge Post-Searchlight. He served as the 72nd governor of Georgia from 1955 to 1959, where he supported educational segregation and opposed the integration of Georgia schools. After the end of his gubernatorial tenure, he returned to his native Bainbridge and entered the real estate business, helping to found Bainbridge College (later Bainbridge State College) in 1970. He served on the college's board of directors and died from lung cancer in 1982.

== Early life and education ==
Griffin was born in Bainbridge, Georgia and graduated from The Citadel in 1929. At The Citadel, Griffin was a battalion commander and also played on the baseball team. He taught in Virginia for a short time before moving back to Bainbridge.

== Career ==
=== Georgia General Assembly and cabinet ===
In 1934, Griffin, a lifelong Democrat, was elected to the Georgia General Assembly. Two years later, he failed in an attempt to be elected to the United States House of Representatives. After that, he served in the administration of Governor Eurith D. Rivers, rising to the post of executive secretary. He also owned the Bainbridge radio station, WMGR, which was established in the late 1940s. The call sign was for Marvin Griffin Radio.

=== Military service ===
When the United States entered World War II, Griffin commanded a Georgia National Guard anti-aircraft battery sent to New Guinea. Griffin was a major for most of World War II and was honorably discharged as a lieutenant colonel in 1944. The next day, Governor Ellis Arnall appointed Griffin adjutant general of the Georgia National Guard, where he served until 1947. During his tenure as adjutant general, Griffin was a brigadier general in the Georgia National Guard.

=== Lieutenant Governor of Georgia ===
Griffin became the first Lieutenant Governor of Georgia to win office in a special election, in 1948. The first person elected as Georgia's lieutenant governor was Melvin E. Thompson, who took office in January 1947, but also claimed the office of governor after the death of Governor-elect Eugene Talmadge in December 1946. Griffin was elected to a full term in 1950.

=== Governor of Georgia ===
==== 1954 election ====
1954 Georgia gubernatorial Democratic primary election

Griffin was seen as the successor to Governor Herman Talmadge, and he won the governorship in 1954 before runoff elections were required in Georgia. Griffin received a plurality of 36.3 percent of the ballots cast. Melvin E. Thompson, Griffin's predecessor as lieutenant governor, trailed with 25.1 percent. Another primary candidate was the later Atlanta Mayor Ivan Allen, Jr. As governor, Griffin was a staunch segregationist. He spoke out against the Brown v. Board of Education decision and pledged to keep Georgia's schools segregated "come hell or high water."

==== Springhill mining disaster ====
In 1958, Griffin, who was a segregationist and accused of being racist, took advantage of the intense media coverage surrounding the Springhill mining disaster in Springhill, Nova Scotia, Canada to promote tourism to his state by offering a group of survivors free vacations to Jekyll Island. However, to the segregationist governor's chagrin, one of the rescued miners was black, resulting in a public relations nightmare.

==== 1956 Sugar Bowl and rivalry with Blake Van Leer ====
Much controversy preceded the 1956 Sugar Bowl, where the Pitt Panthers, including African-American player Bobby Grier, were scheduled to meet the Georgia Tech Yellow Jackets. There was controversy over whether Grier should be allowed to play, and whether Georgia Tech should even play at all due to Governor Griffin's opposition to integration. Tech president Blake R. Van Leer and coach Bobby Dodd met with Griffin privately who promised to not interfere with the game. However, in December 1955, Griffin publicly sent a telegram to his state's Board of Regents in an attempt to pressure Georgia Tech's president Blake R. Van Leer to pull out. Griffin implored teams from Georgia not to engage in racially integrated events involving African Americans as participants or spectators. Van Leer's rejection of this request only added to the controversy stirred by his efforts to push through a vote allowing women to enroll in Georgia Tech. Griffin also sent public telegrams to multiple news publications. Van Leer refused to back down during multiple meetings with the board of regents. In one meeting he would threaten to resign as a show of support when summoned by the board of regents.

He was quoted:

Either we’re going to the Sugar Bowl or you can find yourself another damn president of Georgia Tech.

Griffin would later request that Van Leer and Georgia Tech's players be punished for student riots, followed up with an investigation request. Another state representative John P Drinkard recommended that all of Georgia Tech's state funding be cut off if they proceed and later Griffin suggested anyone who adhered to the principles of integration should not be admitted to Tech. Van Leer still stuck to his statements and later received a standing ovation from the faculty senate. Two weeks after the game, Van Leer died of a heart attack on January 24, 1956, at the Atlanta Veterans Hospital.

A large contingent from the New Orleans community, as well as many related to Georgia Tech, openly fought to bar either Grier, Pitt, or the Yellow Jacket team from the game. However, students, football players and Georgia Tech's president, civil rights leaders, as well as a large number of the Pitt community, succeeded in ensuring that the game took place.

==== Corruption charges ====
Griffin's term was marred by charges of corruption. Several administration members were found guilty of crimes and Griffin was investigated in 1960 by a grand jury, which returned no true bills.

==== 1962 election ====
In 1962, Griffin ran once more for governor but lost in the primary to a moderate candidate, Carl Sanders. Griffin received 332,746 votes (39 percent) to Sanders' 494,978 (58.7 percent). Part of the factor in Griffin's defeat was the abolishment of the county unit system, though one study found that Sanders would have won even if the county unit system had still been in place. Thereafter, Griffin largely retired from politics. After his loss, Griffin commented, "I retired for reasons of health: the voters were sick and tired of me."

In the 1966 gubernatorial race, Griffin supported Democratic nominee Lester Maddox, an Atlanta businessman known for his segregationist views. Maddox's opponent, Republican U.S. Representative Howard Callaway, had supported Griffin in the latter's 1962 campaign. As the publisher of the Post Searchlight in Bainbridge, Griffin at first indicated that he would repay Callaway for the earlier support, but he instead held firm for Maddox. "I consider Bo Callaway one of my best friends, but I can't go with him in the governor's race," Griffin said. Conversely, former Governor Ernest Vandiver, who as lieutenant governor from 1955 to 1959 had frequently quarreled with Governor Griffin, dismissed Maddox as "a pipsqueak" and endorsed Callaway.

In 1968, Griffin was a stand-in candidate for Vice President of the United States on George C. Wallace's American Independent Party ticket. Griffin was thereafter replaced in the second slot by United States Air Force General Curtis LeMay although Griffin's name stayed on the ballot in 27 states, mostly concentrated in the Midwest.

== Later life and death ==
In 1946, Griffin's 14-year-old daughter, Patricia Ann Griffin, died in the Winecoff Hotel fire.

After the end of his gubernatorial tenure, Griffin returned to his hometown of Bainbridge and went into the real estate business. His first wife died in 1970, and Griffin, who was devastated by her death, remarried to Laura Jane Gibson. Griffin and his second wife both led active lives. He helped to found Bainbridge College in 1970, where classes began in 1973. He was a leading advocate and member of the college's board of directors. He also oversaw and directed the Decatur County Sesquicentennial in 1973, at which Georgia governor and future President Jimmy Carter was the honored guest. A lifelong smoker, Griffin was diagnosed with lung cancer, the disease which would eventually kill him. He was heartbroken by the death of his second wife who also died from lung cancer. He died on June 13, 1982, less than a week after his wife's death.

== See also ==
- List of governors of Georgia

Party political offices
Preceded by Melvin E. Thompson	Democratic nominee for Lieutenant Governor of Georgia; 1948, 1950	Succeeded by Ernest Vandiver
Preceded by Herman Talmadge	Democratic nominee for Governor of Georgia; 1954	Succeeded by Ernest Vandiver
Political offices
Preceded by Melvin E. Thompson	Lieutenant Governor of Georgia; November 17, 1948 – January 11, 1955	Succeeded by Ernest Vandiver, Jr.
Preceded by Herman Talmadge	Governor of Georgia; January 11, 1955 – January 13, 1959	Succeeded by Ernest Vandiver, Jr.
