= Lieutenant Governor of Georgia =

Position

- Great Seal of the State of Georgia

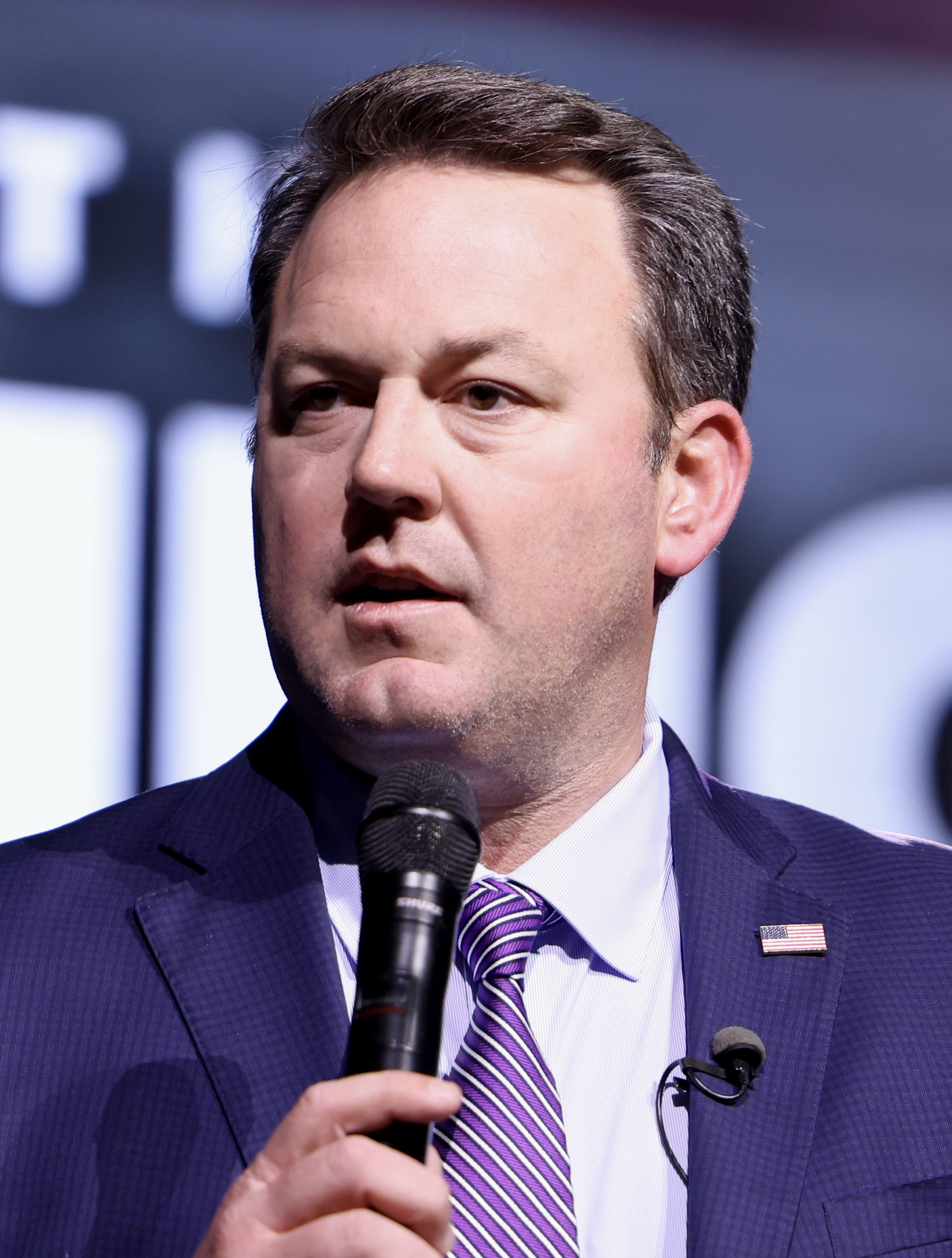
- Incumbent; Burt Jones since January 9, 2023
- Government of Georgia
- Appointer: Elected by popular vote
- Term length: 4-years, no term limit
- Inaugural holder: Melvin E. Thompson
- Formation: August 13, 1945
- Succession: First
- Salary: $54,920 (2023)
- Website: Official website

The lieutenant governor of Georgia is a constitutional officer of the State of Georgia, elected to a four-year term by popular vote. Unlike in some other U.S. states, the lieutenant governor is elected on a separate ticket from the governor of Georgia.

Constitutionally, the lieutenant governor's primary job is to serve as president of Georgia's Senate. In the case of incapacity of the governor, the lieutenant governor assumes their duties and power (but not the title). Should the governor die or otherwise leave office, the lieutenant governor assumes the office for the remainder of the term.

The office of Lieutenant Governor was created by a state constitutional revision in 1945. Prior to that time, Georgia did not have such an office. Elected in 1946 (for a term to begin in 1947) Georgia's first lieutenant governor, Melvin E. Thompson became involved in the three governors controversy.

The current lieutenant governor of Georgia is Republican Burt Jones. Democrat Josh McLaurin is lieutenant governor-elect.

== History ==
The office of lieutenant governor in Georgia was created by an amendment to the state constitution in 1945. The primary purpose of the office was for its incumbent to serve as a successor in the event the governorship became vacant. Melvin E. Thompson became the first person elected to the office in 1946. Due to the outcome of the three governors controversy, he served only two months (January to March 1947) in the office, succeeding to the governorship in March 1947, pending a special election in 1948. That year, Marvin Griffin was elected to the lieutenant governorship. Griffin establish several informal precedents during his tenure, namely by assuming an active leadership role in the State Senate and by naming chairs of the body's committees with the governor's assent. In 2003, the Senate altered its rules and granted the power of appointing committee chairs to the Senate president pro tempore. In November 2010, the Republican majority voted to change the Senate rules, stripping the Lieutenant Governor's ability to appoint the membership of Senate committees.

== Election ==
All candidates for the office of lieutenant governor must also have been a citizen of the United States for at least 15 years and a resident of Georgia for at least six years preceding election. The lieutenant governor is elected on their own ticket separate from the governor. They serve without term limits.

== Powers, duties, and structure ==
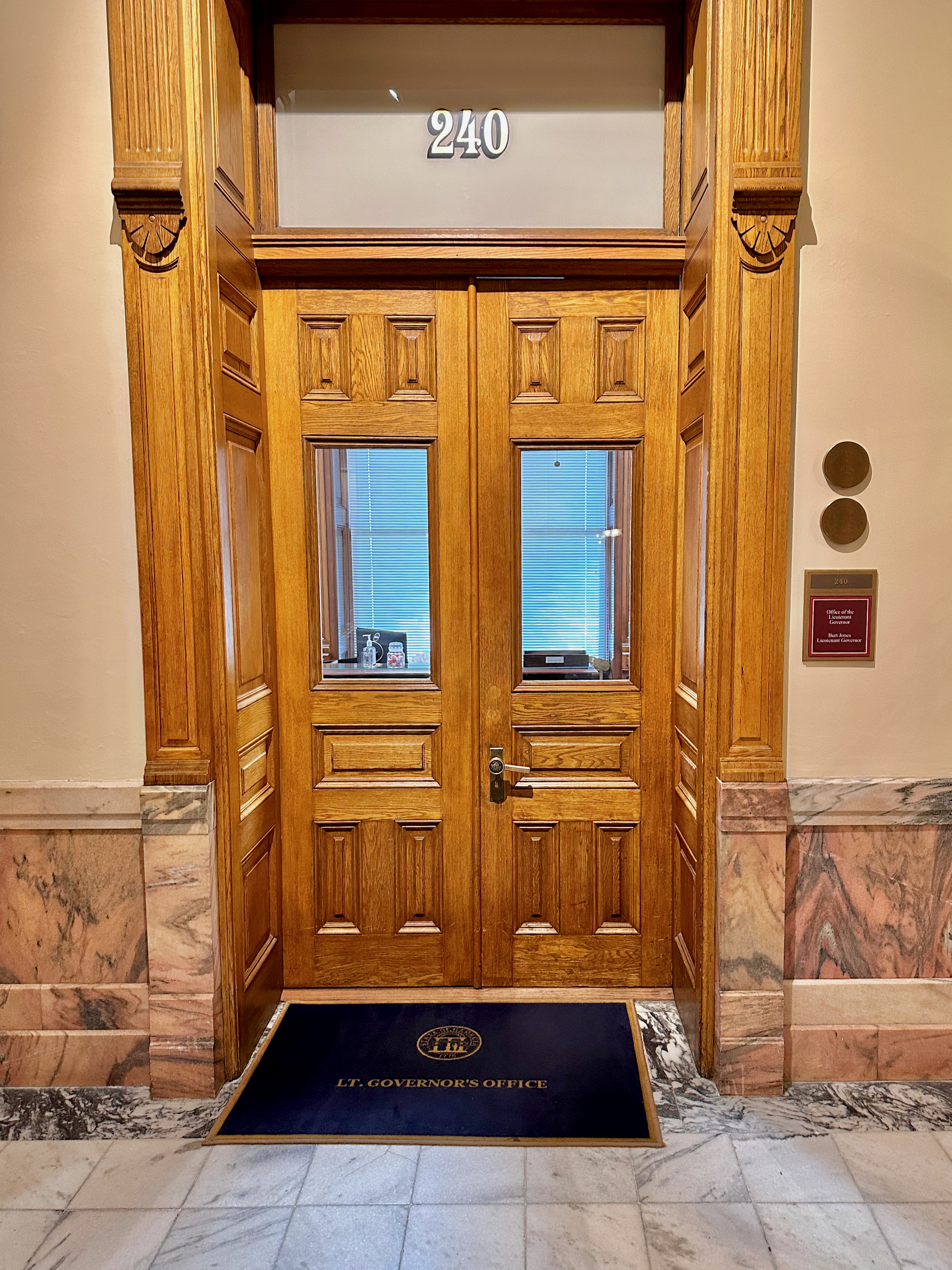
The office of lieutenant governor inside the Georgia Capitol Building

The lieutenant governor's formal duties are limited by the Georgia State Constitution to serving as the President of the Senate and the successor of the governor whenever the governorship becomes vacant due to the governor's death or a determination by the State Supreme Court that they are incapable of discharging their duties. The lieutenant governor assumes the gubernatorial powers and duties pending the next general election in the state.

As President of the Senate the lieutenant governor presides over debate in the Senate. As the lieutenant governor is not a member of the Senate, the lieutenant governor is barred from sponsoring legislation. The Rules of the Georgia State Senate assign the president of the Senate to appoint two senators to the Committee on Assignments and to serve as the Chair of the committee, but the Chair may only vote in case of a tie. Additionally, the president is a member of and appoints three other members to the Committee on Administrative Affairs. Under the supervision of the State Senate, the President "shall as a matter of course and without debate, report the reference of bills to the proper committee." Senate pages are supervised by the president who "shall establish a program of familiarization with state government, its procedures and those duties and responsibilities which will be required of pages." As the Senate's presiding officer, the lieutenant governor can exercise influence over state legislation, though the Senate can disregard their wishes at its discretion.

== List of lieutenant governors of Georgia ==
=== Parties ===
Democratic (10) Republican (3)

No.	Lt. Governor	Term in office	Party	Election	Governor
1	Melvin E. Thompson	January 14, 1947 – March 18, 1947	Democratic	1946	Disputed (Three governors controversy)
—	Office vacant from March 18, 1947 - November 17, 1948		—	1946	Melvin E. Thompson
2	Marvin Griffin	November 17, 1948 – January 11, 1955	Democratic	1948 (special)	Herman Talmadge
2	Marvin Griffin	November 17, 1948 – January 11, 1955	Democratic	1950	Herman Talmadge
3	Ernest Vandiver	January 11, 1955 – January 13, 1959	Democratic	1954	Marvin Griffin
4	Garland T. Byrd	January 13, 1959 – January 15, 1963	Democratic	1958	Ernest Vandiver
5	Peter Zack Geer	January 15, 1963 – January 11, 1967	Democratic	1962	Carl Sanders
6	George T. Smith	January 11, 1967 – January 12, 1971	Democratic	1966	Lester Maddox
7	Lester Maddox	January 12, 1971 – January 14, 1975	Democratic	1970	Jimmy Carter
8	Zell Miller	January 14, 1975 – January 13, 1991	Democratic	1974	George Busbee
8	Zell Miller	January 14, 1975 – January 13, 1991	Democratic	1978	George Busbee
8	Zell Miller	January 14, 1975 – January 13, 1991	Democratic	1982	Joe Frank Harris
8	Zell Miller	January 14, 1975 – January 13, 1991	Democratic	1986	Joe Frank Harris
9	Pierre Howard	January 13, 1991 – January 11, 1999	Democratic	1990	Zell Miller
9	Pierre Howard	January 13, 1991 – January 11, 1999	Democratic	1994	Zell Miller
10	Mark Taylor	January 11, 1999 – January 8, 2007	Democratic	1998	Roy Barnes
10	Mark Taylor	January 11, 1999 – January 8, 2007	Democratic	2002	Sonny Perdue
11	Casey Cagle	January 8, 2007 – January 14, 2019	Republican	2006	Sonny Perdue
11	Casey Cagle	January 8, 2007 – January 14, 2019	Republican	2010	Nathan Deal
11	Casey Cagle	January 8, 2007 – January 14, 2019	Republican	2014	Nathan Deal
12	Geoff Duncan	January 14, 2019 – January 9, 2023	Republican (Note: Duncan would later join the Democratic Party in 2025 after leaving office.)	2018	Brian Kemp
13	Burt Jones	January 9, 2023 – Incumbent	Republican	2022	Brian Kemp

== See also ==
- Georgia Senate
- Georgia House of Representatives
- Georgia General Assembly
