= Fulton Lovell =

American politician and official (1913–1980)

Fulton Lovell (August 3, 1913 – September 23, 1980), a native and resident of Rabun County, Georgia, was the director of the Georgia Game and Fish Commission from 1949 until 1963. During his tenure as Game and Fish chief, he directed successful efforts to re-establish wild turkey and white-tailed deer throughout much of Georgia. These game species had been virtually eliminated from Georgia forests due to over-hunting and habitat destruction during the early part of the twentieth century.

In the early 1960s, Lovell envisioned a camping and recreation area on Lake Burton to serve an increasing number of boaters and fishermen on the scenic Blue Ridge Mountain reservoir, and land acquisition efforts soon began. Some land parcels were purchased from private owners. Other property was conveyed to the State of Georgia by the Georgia Power Company, Lake Burton's primary owner and operator. In 1963, Moccasin Creek Campground was opened by the Game and Fish Commission under the management of personnel from the adjacent Lake Burton Fish Hatchery. The new lakeside camping area was hugely popular from the beginning and in 1966, after being transferred from the Game and Fish Commission to the Georgia State Parks Department, the area was officially designated Moccasin Creek State Park.

Lovell was elected to represent the 6th District in the Georgia State House of Representatives in 1966. After one term in the state legislature, Lovell joined the Georgia Department of Labor and was named Assistant Director of the department's Employment Security Agency. He retired from the Department of Labor in 1977. Lovell died after a long battle with thyroid cancer on September 23, 1980. On May 16, 1993, a waterfront pavilion at Moccasin Creek State Park was dedicated as the Fulton Lovell Assembly Shelter to honor Lovell's years of state government service.
