= Betty Talmadge =

Former First Lady of Georgia (1948–1955)

First Lady of Georgia
- In role November 17, 1948 – January 11, 1955
- Governor: Herman Talmadge
- Preceded by: Ann Thompson
- Succeeded by: Lib Griffin
- In office January 15, 1947 – March 18, 1947
- Governor: Herman Talmadge
- Preceded by: Mildred Arnall
- Succeeded by: Ann Thompson

Personal details
- Born: Leila Elizabeth Shingler; September 17, 1923 Ashburn, Georgia, U.S.
- Died: November 7, 2005 (aged 82) Lovejoy, Georgia, U.S.
- Resting place: Rose Hill Cemetery; Ashburn, Georgia, U.S.
- Party: Democratic
- Spouse: Herman Talmadge (m. 1941; div. 1978)
- Children: 2
- Parents: Clinton D. Shingler Sr.; Stella Julian
- Education: University of Georgia
- Occupation: Civic leader; businesswoman; author; socialite; landowner

Leila Elizabeth "Betty" Talmadge (née Shingler; September 17, 1923 – November 7, 2005) was an American civic leader, author, socialite, landowner, and businesswoman. As the wife of Herman Talmadge, she served as First Lady of Georgia from 1948 to 1955. Her husband later served as a U.S. Senator, at which time she became known as a prominent socialite and society hostess in Washington, D.C., entertaining other members of the Washington political elite including Lady Bird Johnson, Rosalynn Carter, Pat Nixon, and Judy Agnew.

Following a bitter divorce in 1976, she testified against her ex-husband for financial corruption to the Senate Ethics Committee in 1978. As part of their divorce settlement, Talmadge was awarded ownership of Lovejoy Plantation, her husband's family home in Lovejoy, Georgia, where she ran a restaurant. She became a prominent businesswoman, owning and operating a multi-million dollar meat brokerage company, Talmadge & Associates, and an event planning and hostessing company, Betty Talmadge Enterprises. Talmadge also authored two cookbooks specializing in Southern cuisine. She was a member of the women's business organization The Committee of 200 and was awarded the 1983 Entrepreneur of the Year Award by the Georgia Business and Industry Association. In her later life, she purchased Rural Home, the plantation of Margaret Mitchell's family, but died before she could finish restoring it.

== Early life and family ==
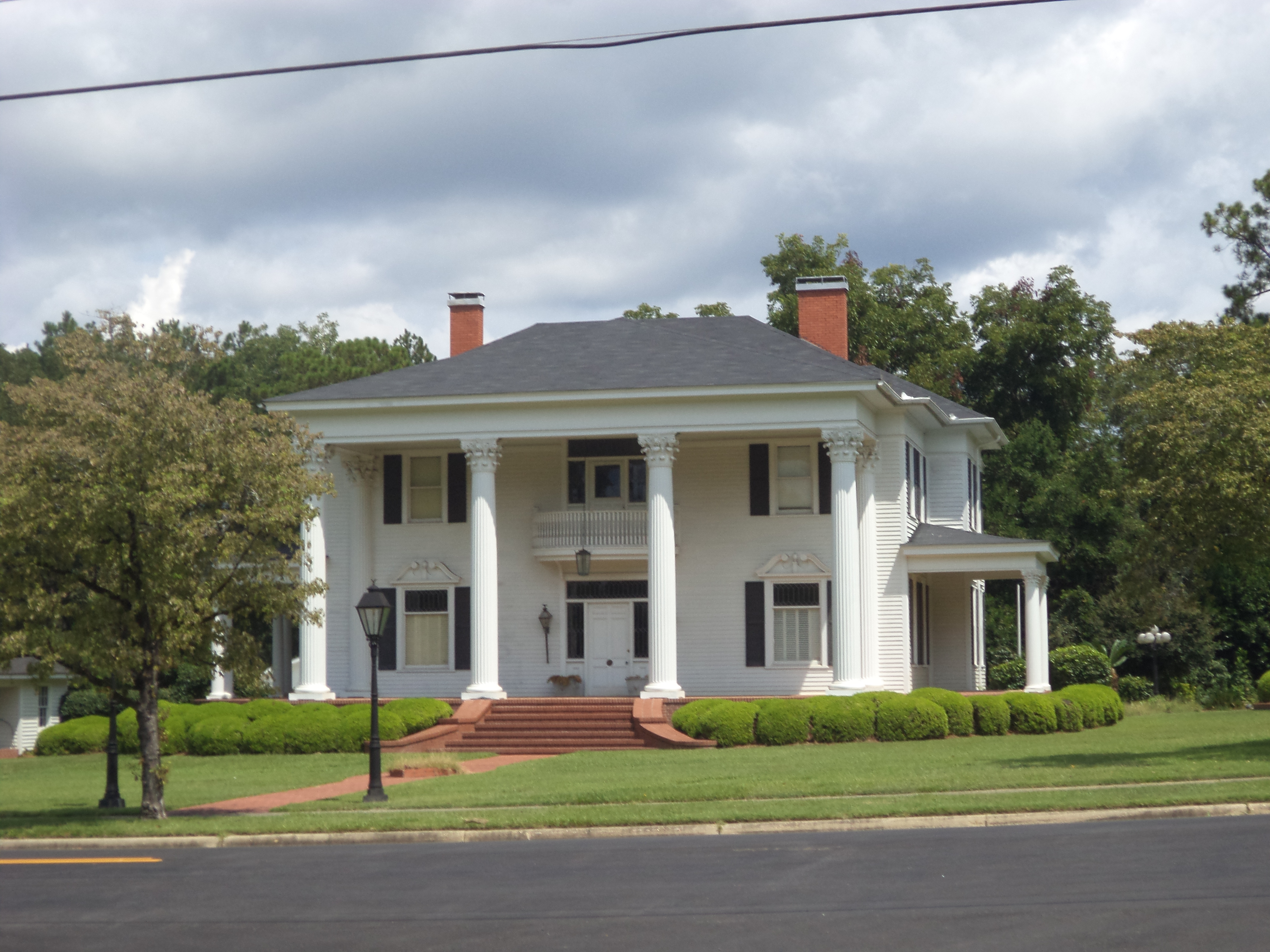
The Thomas J. Shingler House in Ashburn

Talmadge was born Leila Elizabeth Shingler in Ashburn, Georgia on September 17, 1923, to Clinton F. Shingler Sr. and Stella Julian Shingler. She was born into a wealthy family of politicians and entrepreneurs. The Shingler family owned multiple grand homes in the town of Ashburn. Her father, a letter carrier, later served as mayor of Ashburn. Her grandfather was in the cotton and lumber businesses and owned a chain of roadside stores that sold pecan products.

She attended the University of Georgia.

== Marriage and public life ==
In 1937, she married the lawyer Herman Talmadge, the son of former Georgia governor Eugene Talmadge. They had two sons, Herman Eugene Talmadge Jr. and Robert Shingler Talmadge. The family lived at Lovejoy Plantation, the Talmadge family's historic mansion and farm, where they owned and operated Talmadge Farms, a $6 million cured ham business which they sold in 1960. They had a pet rabbit, named Rabbit E. Lee in honor of Confederate general Robert E. Lee, and a pet donkey named Assley Wilkes, in reference to the Gone With the Wind character Ashley Wilkes.

In 1948, her husband became the 71st Governor of Georgia, making her the First Lady of Georgia. As first lady, she was known for her lavish parties and "antebellum charm". She hosted elaborate gatherings for politicians and business leaders at Lovejoy Plantation, where she romanticized and glorified the Confederate South, having her servants dress as soldiers in Confederate gray uniforms and hiring Dixieland banjo players.

In 1957, her husband was elected to represent Georgia in the United States Senate. They purchased a condominium in Washington, D.C., where she was known to entertain other members of the political elite.

Talmadge was a personal friend and bridge partner of Lady Bird Johnson, who gifted her a metal bust of President Lyndon B. Johnson. She was also a friend of First Ladies Rosalynn Carter and Pat Nixon and Second Lady Judy Agnew.

On 12 January 1974, Talmadge sponsored the launch of the submarine USS Richard B. Russell.

In 1978, she ran in the Democratic primary for a seat in the U.S. House of Representatives for Georgia's Georgia's 6th congressional district, but lost the primary. The seat was later filled by Republican Newt Gingrich.

== Divorce ==
In 1975, their son Robert drowned while swimming in Lake Lanier. Her husband filed for divorce in 1976 without notifying her, she later found out while watching it on the news. They reached a settlement in 1978 that declared she would receive $150,000 in cash, 100 acres of Lovejoy Plantation, the deed to the Lovejoy Plantation house, and have access to the remaining 1,200 acres of the plantation. The settlement also declared that her ex-husband was responsible for paying her portion of the estate's property tax and that he must assist in her meat brokerage business by helping keep existing customers and cultivating new clients.

During her ex-husband's 1980 Senate financial investigation, she testified against him to the Senate Ethics Committee.

== Business ventures ==
Talmadge ran a country ham business and later operated a restaurant out of her home in Lovejoy. She was one of the top meat producers for Cagles, with yearly sales nearing $5.5 million from her meat brokerage company called Talmadge & Associates. She also owned and operated Betty Talmadge Enterprises, which specialized in Southern-style entertaining and hostessing. Talmadge was a member of The Committee of 200, an organization for women in business, and was awarded the Georgia Business and Industry Association's Entrepreneur of the Year award in 1983.

In 1977, she published the cookbook How to Cook a Pig & Other Back-to-the-Farm Recipes. In 1983, she published Betty Talmadge's Lovejoy Plantation Cookbook, which included recipes for Southern cuisine, including cornbread, homemade ice cream, mint juleps, and barbeque.

Talmadge appeared on the April 5, 1953, episode of What's My Line, and had a small role, as Sarah, in the 1984 made-for-television drama film The Baron and the Kid.

=== Purchase of Rural Home Plantation ===
In July 1980, Talmadge bought Rural Home, a 19th-century plantation house in Clayton County that was the childhood home of Margaret Mitchell's maternal grandmother, Annie Fitzgerald Stephens, and the basis for Mitchell's Tara in Gone With the Wind. She had the house moved from its location near Jonesboro closer to her plantation home in nearby Lovejoy. Talmadge had the 1873 addition to the house dismantled and stored the framing and finish materials in an old milk barn on her property, while the original antebellum house and kitchen were moved, intact, to a field across the drive from her house. On July 6, 2005, a tornado knocked the house off of its temporary foundation.

== Death and burial ==
Talmadge died at Lovejoy Plantation on November 7, 2005, before finishing her plans for Rural Home. She is buried at Rose Hill Cemetery in Ashburn.
