= USS Richard B. Russell =

Submarine of the United States

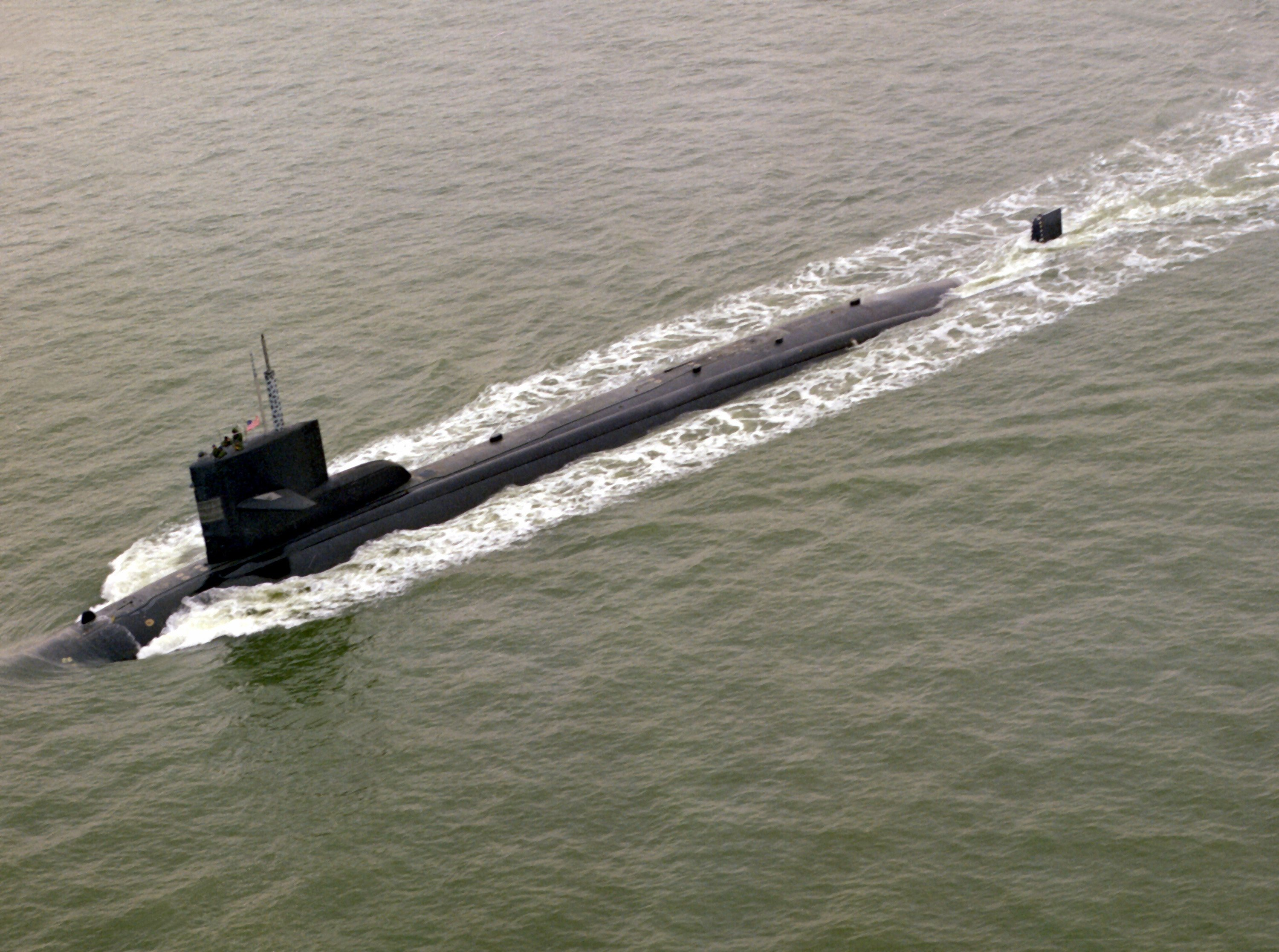
- USS Richard B. Russell (SSN-687) in January 1984. Note the antenna buoy housing, or "bustle", behind her sail, which had been installed in August 1977.

History

United States
- Name: USS Richard B. Russell
- Namesake: Richard B. Russell, Jr.
- Awarded: 25 July 1969
- Builder: Newport News Shipbuilding and Dry Dock Company, Newport News, Virginia
- Laid down: 19 October 1971
- Launched: 12 January 1974
- Sponsored by: Mrs. Herman E. Talmadge
- Commissioned: 16 August 1975
- Decommissioned: 24 June 1994
- Stricken: 24 June 1994
- Identification: SSN-687
- Motto: "They Saved The Best For Last"
- Nickname(s): "Dickey B."
- Honors and awards: Presidential Unit Citation; 1990–91; 6 Navy Unit Commendations; Meritorious Unit Commendation 1981; 7 Battle Effectiveness Awards
- Fate: Scrapping via Ship and Submarine Recycling Program begun 1 October 2001, completed 3 January 2003
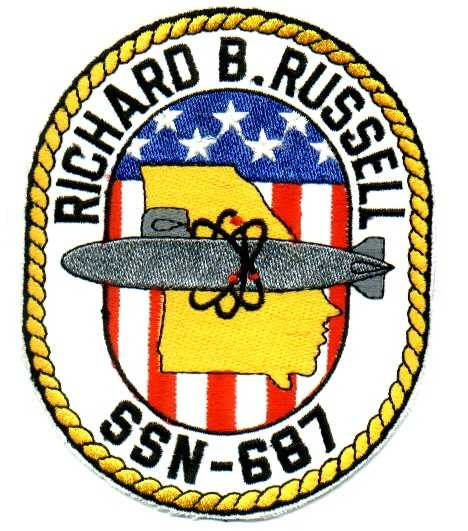
- Badge

General characteristics
- Class & type: Sturgeon-class attack submarine
- Displacement: 3,978 long tons (4,042 t) light; 4,270 long tons (4,339 t) full; 292 long tons (297 t) dead
- Length: 302 ft 3 in (92.13 m)
- Beam: 31 ft 8 in (9.65 m)
- Draft: 28 ft 8 in (8.74 m)
- Installed power: 15,000 shp (11,000 kW)
- Propulsion: One S5W nuclear reactor, two steam turbines, one screw
- Speed: 15 knots (28 km/h; 17 mph) surfaced; 25 knots (46 km/h; 29 mph) submerged
- Test depth: 1,300 ft (400 m)
- Complement: 126 (14 officers, 112 enlisted)
- Armament: 4 × 21 in (533 mm) torpedo tubes; UUM-44A SUBROC missiles

USS Richard B. Russell (SSN-687), a Sturgeon-class attack submarine, has been the only ship of the United States Navy to be named for Richard B. Russell, Jr. (1897–1971), United States Senator from Georgia (1933–1971).

== Construction and commissioning ==
The contract for Richard B. Russell's construction was awarded on 25 July 1969 and her keel was laid down 19 October 1971 by Newport News Shipbuilding at Newport News, Virginia, authenticated by Mrs. Ina Russell Stacey, sister and official hostess for Senator Russell. Richard B. Russell was launched at Newport News on 12 January 1974, sponsored by Mrs. Leila Elizabeth (Betty) Talmadge (née Shingler), wife of Herman E. Talmadge (1913–2002), U.S. Senator from Georgia (1957–1981), and commissioned on 16 August 1975.

== Service history ==
Richard B. Russell silhouette after 1977

In August 1977, Richard B. Russell was fitted with a large housing attached to her hull just aft of her sail, containing a tethered antenna buoy that was under development. The housing, called a "bustle" (and particularly the "Russell bustle"), gave her a unique profile and her nickname became "Dickey "B"." Some other submarines in this subclass (SSN-678 long hulls) would also receive this bustle modification. At some point the RBR bustle was either modified or replaced with a model that was similar to that installed on the USS Parche (SSN-683).

One point of interest about the fitting of the bustle came about as it was being installed. A crane was used to lift the bustle for the installation process. The crane used had insufficient capacity to lift the bustle. The bustle went into the water, and the crane was pulled onto its side. The crane operator was pinned inside the crane cab. A second man, previously reported in this paragraph as being pinned, was actually a first responder who entered the cab, secured the crane mechanically, and rendered first aid to the injured operator. A barge-mounted crane was later brought in to lift the bustle from the water, and right the first crane.

The Richard B. Russell was active throughout the Cold War and even patrolled waters off the coast of Mermansk.

In 1978, Richard B. Russell completed a three-month deployment in the North Atlantic Ocean for which she received a Navy Unit Commendation and an Expeditionary Medal.

In 1980, Richard B. Russell completed a five-month deployment in the Mediterranean Sea. In 1981 she completed a deployment in the North Atlantic Ocean for which she received a Meritorious Unit Commendation and an Expeditionary Medal.

In 1982, Richard B. Russell went through the Panama Canal and arrived at Mare Island Naval Shipyard in Vallejo, California, for an extended overhaul. During her time at Mare Island, it was decided that she would become a special projects submarine. After a short period of post-overhaul testing and sea trials, she underwent extensive ocean engineering modifications prior to commencing operations as a unit of Submarine Development Group 1. As a member of Sub Dev Group 1, she spearheaded a testing program for submarine rescue technology.

Richard B. Russell's role as a fast attack submarine as well as a development and testing platform earned her the Presidential Unit Citation, the highest award any naval unit can be given. She also earned six Navy Unit Commendations, and seven Battle Effectiveness Awards (formerly the Battle Efficiency Award), commonly known as the Battle "E", during her career.

Richard B. Russell was placed in reserve while still in commission on 1 July 1993.

== Decommissioning and disposal ==
Richard B. Russell was both decommissioned and stricken from the Naval Vessel Register on 24 June 1994. She was stored at Bremerton, Washington, until 1 October 2001, when she entered the Nuclear-Powered Ship and Submarine Recycling Program at Puget Sound Naval Shipyard in Bremerton for scrapping. Her scrapping was completed on 3 January 2003.
