= 1950 Georgia gubernatorial election =

1950 Georgia Democratic gubernatorial primary
- June 28, 1950

410 county unit votes 206 unit votes needed to win
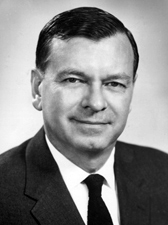

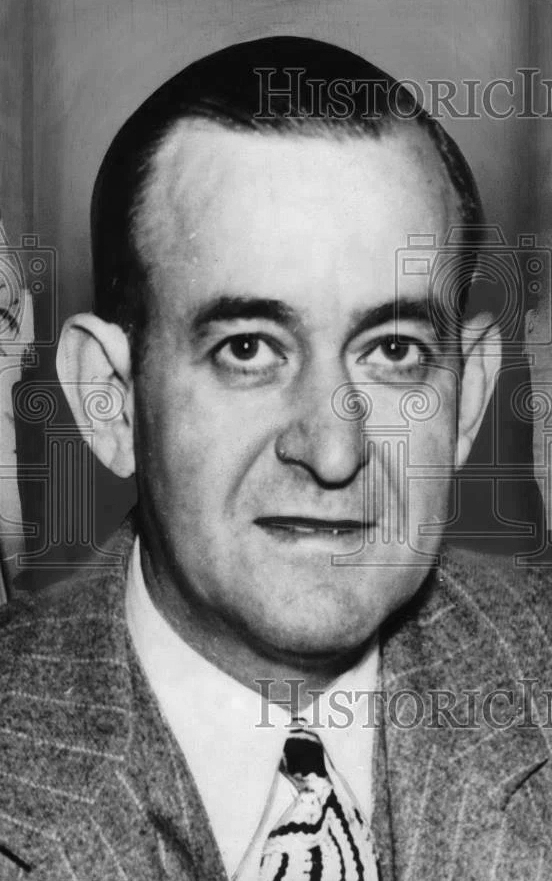
Nominee	Herman Talmadge	Melvin E. Thompson
Party	Democratic	Democratic
Electoral vote	295	115
Popular vote	287,637	279,137
Percentage	49.33%	47.88%
- County results Talmadge: 40–50% 50–60% 60–70% 70–80% 80–90% >90% Tie: 40–50% Thompson: 40–50% 50–60% 60–70%
Governor before election
Herman Talmadge
Democratic
Elected Governor
Herman Talmadge
Democratic

The 1950 Georgia gubernatorial election was held on November 7, 1950. Incumbent governor Herman Talmadge won the Democratic primary over Melvin Thompson on June 28 with 49.33% of the vote and 295 out of 410 county unit votes. The primary was a rematch of the 1948 special election. This would be the last gubernatorial rematch in the state until 2022.

At this time, Georgia was a one-party state, and the Democratic nomination was tantamount to victory. Talmadge was re-elected in the November general election without an opponent.

== Democratic primary ==
=== County unit system ===
From 1917 until 1962, the Democratic Party in the U.S. state of Georgia used a voting system called the county unit system to determine victors in statewide primary elections.

The system was ostensibly designed to function similarly to the Electoral College, but in practice the large ratio of unit votes for small, rural counties to unit votes for more populous urban areas provided outsized political influence to the smaller counties.

Under the county unit system, the 159 counties in Georgia were divided by population into three categories. The largest eight counties were classified as "Urban", the next-largest 30 counties were classified as "Town", and the remaining 121 counties were classified as "Rural". Urban counties were given 6 unit votes, Town counties were given 4 unit votes, and Rural counties were given 2 unit votes, for a total of 410 available unit votes. Each county's unit votes were awarded on a winner-take-all basis.

Candidates were required to obtain a majority of unit votes (not necessarily a majority of the popular vote), or 206 total unit votes, to win the election. If no candidate received a majority in the initial primary, a runoff election was held between the top two candidates to determine a winner.

=== Candidates ===
- Pat Avery
- C. O. Baker
- J. W. Jenkins
- Herman Talmadge, incumbent governor since 1948
- Melvin Thompson, former governor (1947–48)

=== Results ===
Candidate	Popular vote		County unit vote	
Candidate	Votes	%	Votes	%
Herman Talmadge	287,637	49.33	295	71.95
Melvin Thompson	279,137	47.88	115	28.05
C. O. Baker	10,250	1.76		
Pat Avery	3,050	0.52		
J. W. Jenkins	2,963	0.51		
Total	583,037	100.00	410	100.00

== General election ==
=== Results ===
1950 Georgia gubernatorial election
Party	Candidate	Votes	%	±%
Democratic	Herman Talmadge (incumbent)	230,771	98.44%	▲0.87
Independent	Morgan Blake	3,325	1.42%	N/A
N/A	Write-ins	334	0.14%	▲0.13
Majority		227,446	97.02	
Turnout		234,430		
Democratic hold		Swing		
