= 1962 United States Senate election in Georgia =

1962 U.S. Senate Democratic primary in Georgia
- September 12, 1962
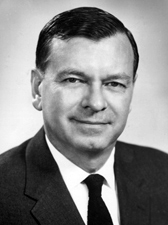

Nominee	Herman Talmadge	Henry M. Henderson
Party	Democratic	Democratic
Popular vote	673,782	91,654
Percentage	88.03%	11.79%
- County results Talmadge: 60–70% 70–80% 80–90% >90%
U.S. senator before election
Herman Talmadge
Democratic
Elected U.S. Senator
Herman Talmadge
Democratic

The 1962 United States Senate election in Georgia took place on November 5, 1962. Incumbent Democratic U.S. Senator Herman Talmadge was re-elected to a second consecutive term in office, winning large victories in the primary and general elections.

At this time, Georgia was a one-party state. Talmadge's victory in the September 12 primary was tantamount to election, and he was unopposed in the general election.

== Democratic primary ==
=== Candidates ===
- Henry M. Henderson
- Herman Talmadge, incumbent U.S. Senator since 1957

=== Results ===
1962 Democratic U.S. Senate primary results
Party	Candidate	Votes	%
Democratic	Herman Talmadge (incumbent)	673,782	88.03%
Democratic	Henry M. Henderson	91,654	11.97%
Total votes		765,436	100.00%

== General election ==
=== Results ===
1962 United States Senate election in Georgia
Party	Candidate	Votes	%	±%
Democratic	Herman Talmadge (incumbent)	306,250	100.00%	▲0.03
Total votes		306,250	100.00%	
Democratic hold		Swing		

== See also ==
- 1962 United States Senate elections
