= The Baron and the Kid =

1984 American drama film

- Genre: Drama
- Written by: Bill Stratton, Paul Richey, Billy Sherrill, Jerry Taylor
- Directed by: Gary Nelson
- Starring: Johnny Cash; Darren McGavin
- Music by: Brad Fiedel
- Country of origin: United States
- Original language: English

Production
- Executive producers: Kenneth Kaufman; Michael Lepiner
- Producer: Thomas John Kane
- Cinematography: John Lindley
- Running time: 94 minutes

Original release
- Release: November 21, 1984

The Baron and the Kid is a 1984 American made-for-television Drama film starring Johnny Cash. The film was directed by Gary Nelson.

== Plot ==
William “The Baron” Addington (Johnny Cash) is a former pool pro whose lifetime of drinking has cost him his career and family. Trying to set himself straight, he quits drinking and begins to play pool for charity.

When William comes across a young man named Billy Joe Stanley (Greg Webb) managed by Jack Streamer (Darren McGavin), the two team up.

A series of chance revelations leads William to discover that Billy is his son.

The two join a tournament before William reveals his true identity as Billy’s father.

== Cast ==
- Johnny Cash as The Baron / Will
- Darren McGavin as Jack Streamer
- Greg Webb as Billy Joe Stanley
- Tracy Pollan as Mary Beth Phillips
- June Carter Cash as Dee Dee Stanley
- Richard Roundtree as Frosty
- Claude Akins as Harley Medford
- Dan Albright as Barney
- Harvey Andrews as Railbird #1
- Bill Ash as Paunehy
- Earl Poole Ball as Dr. Pockett
- Ron Baskin as Referee
- Jere Beery as Jim
- Tracey Bise as Inga
- Ned Bridges as Arnie
- Bill Crabb as No-Neck
- Bill Eudaly as Railbird #2
- Marc Gowan as Railbird
- Tom Harper as Stan
- Charles Kahlenberg as Referee
- Julie Kemp as Jaimie
- Karen Kruger as Helper
- Victoria Loving as Amelia
- Willie Hugh Nelson as Martin the Mechanic
- Mike Massey as Manning
- Wallace Merck as Gus
- Danny Nelson as Dixon Vance
- Wendy Michelle Owen as Waitress
- Ralph Pace as Crockett
- Elijah Perry as Teaser (as Jerry Rushing)
- Betty Talmadge as Sarah
- Roy Tatum as Cranker
- Wallace Wilkinson as Brady
- Don Young as Kirk
- Dean DuBois as Trooper Thompson (uncredited)
- Sandra Webb as Patron (uncredited)
- Chad Hillman as Patron (uncredited)

== Production ==
Production was carried out by Gary Nelson. The movie was filmed in Atlanta, Georgia, as well as Norcross, Georgia, with scenes filmed in Cedartown.

== Reception ==
The movie received mostly positive reviews, receiving an 87% on Rotten Tomatoes and a 69% on Metacritic.
