= 1968 United States Senate election in Georgia =

- November 5, 1968
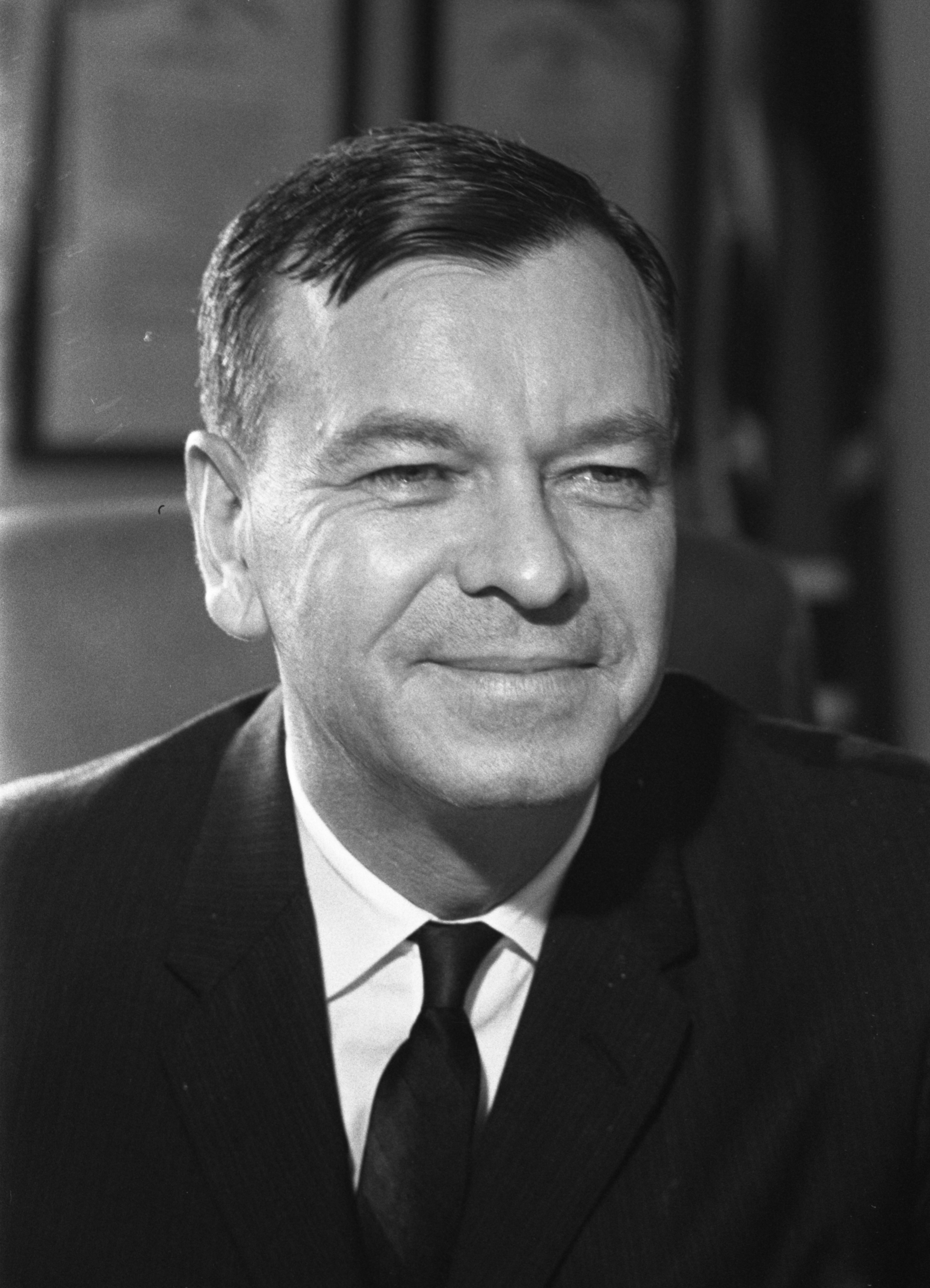

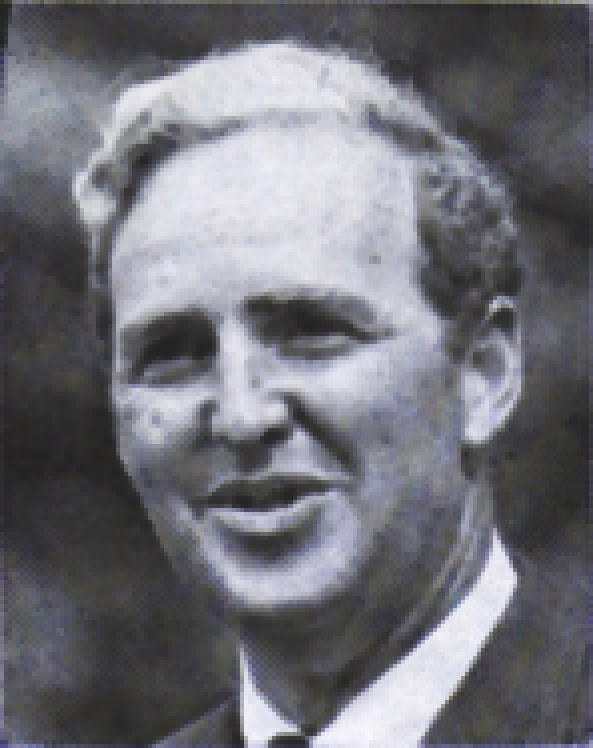
Nominee	Herman Talmadge	E. Earl Patton
Party	Democratic	Republican
Popular vote	885,093	246,865
Percentage	77.51%	22.49%
- County results Talmadge: 50–60% 60–70% 70–80% 80–90% >90% Patton: 50–60%
U.S. senator before election
Herman Talmadge
Democratic
Elected U.S. Senator
Herman Talmadge
Democratic

The 1968 United States Senate election in Georgia took place on November 5, 1968. Incumbent Democratic U.S. Senator Herman Talmadge was re-elected to a third consecutive term in office, winning large victories in the primary and general elections.

For the first time, Republicans held a primary election to nominate a candidate for U.S. Senate.

== Democratic primary ==
=== Candidates ===
- Maynard Jackson, Atlanta attorney for the National Labor Relations Board
- Herman Talmadge, incumbent U.S. Senator since 1953

=== Results ===
1968 Democratic U.S. Senate primary results
Party	Candidate	Votes	%
Democratic	Herman Talmadge (incumbent)	627,915	75.19%
Democratic	Maynard Jackson	207,171	24.81%
Total votes		835,086	100.00%

== Republican primary ==
=== Candidates ===
- E. Earl Patton, Fulton County businessman
- Jack Sells

=== Results ===
1968 Republican U.S. Senate primary results
Party	Candidate	Votes	%
Republican	E. Earl Patton	20,316	59.54%
Republican	Jack Sells	13,805	40.46%
Total votes		34,121	100.00%

== General election ==
=== Results ===
1968 United States Senate election in Georgia
Party	Candidate	Votes	%	±%
Democratic	Herman Talmadge (incumbent)	885,093	77.51%	▼22.49
Republican	E. Earl Patton	256,796	22.49%	▲22.49
Total votes		1,141,889	100.00%	
Democratic hold		Swing		

== See also ==
- 1968 United States Senate elections
