= E. Earl Patton =

American politician (1927–2011)

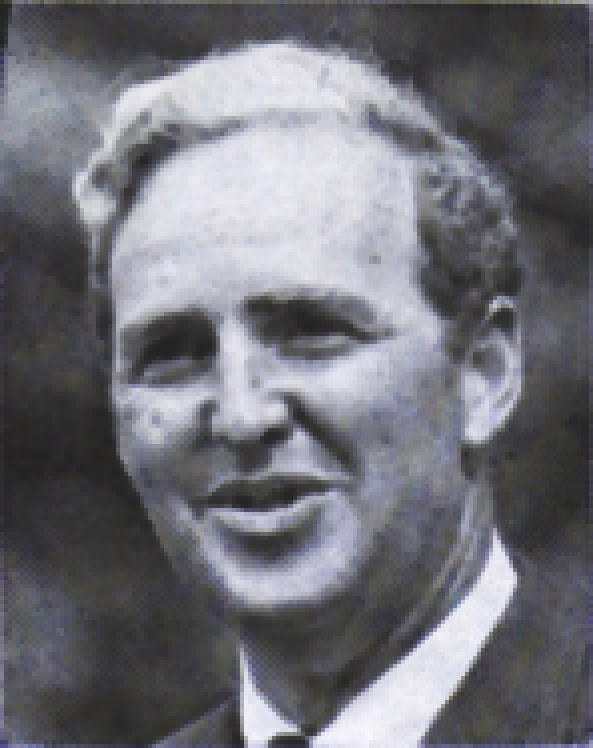
- Patton c. 1969

Member of the Georgia Senate from the 40th district
- In office June 4, 1969 – January 8, 1973
- Preceded by: Dan MacIntyre
- Succeeded by: Paul Coverdell

Personal details
- Born: Elbert Earl Patton, Jr. June 27, 1927 Atlanta, Georgia, U.S.
- Died: April 27, 2011 (aged 83) At Lake Burton, Georgia, U.S.
- Party: Republican
- Education: North Atlanta High School; Georgia Institute of Technology
- Profession: Businessman

Military service
- Branch/service: United States Navy; United States Air Force
- Battles/wars: World War II; Korean War

Elbert Earl Patton Jr. (June 27, 1927 – April 27, 2011) was an American businessman from Atlanta and a prominent member of the Republican Party from the U.S. state of Georgia.

== Background ==
Patton graduated from North Atlanta High School, then known as North Fulton High School, on D-Day, June 6, 1944. Thereafter he studied for a few weeks at the Georgia Institute of Technology in Atlanta but interrupted his education to enter the United States Navy. On his discharge in 1946, he returned to Georgia Tech and completed his formal education in 1949 in the field of industrial management. At Tech, he was a member and officer of Sigma Chi fraternity. During the Korean War, Patton accepted a commission in the newly organized United States Air Force. He flew one hundred combat missions in Korea before he was discharged in 1951 and returned to the United States.

Patton made his living in banking, real estate and hotel development. His Patton and Associates engaged in the sale of waste systems and equipment. He also started the Cobb Bank and Trust Company and the Marriott at Sawgrass in Ponte Vedra in northeastern Florida. In later years, he managed properties in Atlanta, Augusta, and Albany, Georgia. In 1956, he joined with others on the Northside to create the Cherokee Town and Country Club, of which he served as the president in 1970. Patton was also active in the Young Men's Christian Association and worked to build a "Y" facility on the Northside of Atlanta. Patton was chairman of the Cobb County Chamber of Commerce and helped to establish the Georgia International Convention Center. He served on committees with the 1996 Olympic Games and Paralympics as well as Super Bowl XXVIII. For a time, he was the chairman of the Atlanta Convention and Visitors' Center Bureau.

== Republican politics ==
Patton was elected on June 4, 1969 to fill the vacancy caused by the death of Dan MacIntyre. Patton won the first ever Republican primary for the U.S. Senate held in the summer of 1968. That fall he was soundly defeated by the Democrat Herman Talmadge. Patton received 256,796 votes (22.5 percent) to Talmadge's 885,103 (77.3 percent). Patton was the first Republican in Georgia to run for the U.S. Senate since the Reconstruction era. Patton's defeat was particularly disappointing in that his party's gubernatorial nominee in 1966, Howard Callaway, had actually outpolled the Democratic choice in the general election, Lester Maddox, but had fallen short of the required popular majority. The state legislature at that point chose Maddox to serve as governor from 1967 to 1971.

Thereafter, Patton rebounded to win a seat in the Georgia State Senate and served from 1969 to 1973 from northern Fulton County. At the time his party held relatively few seats in the chamber, but Patton lived to see a dominant GOP majority in the Georgia Senate. Patton met with each Republican U.S. president from Dwight D. Eisenhower to George W. Bush while they were in Georgia on other business. Twelve years afterwards, Senator Talmadge was unseated by Mack Mattingly, who became the first Republican U.S. Senator from Georgia since Reconstruction though he served only one term from 1981 to 1987.

Robert Hall, former president of the Georgia Tech Alumni Association and a former Rotary International district governor, said that Patton's "actions followed his beliefs. He was leading the way when being a Republican politician wasn't the thing to do. "He didn't mind standing out. You always knew where Earl was and what he stood for."

== Family and death ==
Patton and his wife, the former Mary Louise Morris, whom he married on March 19, 1949, had four children: Thomas Earl Patton (born 1952), Richard Morris Patton (born 1954), Louise Patton Pritchard (born 1955), and Lorena Hall Patton (born 1960).

Patton died on April 27, 2011, when an EF3 tornado struck his second home on Lake Burton in Rabun County. Before his death, Patton had retorted on several occasions that he enjoyed his second home so much that he hoped he was there at the time of his own death. Memorial services were held at the Peachtree Presbyterian Church in Atlanta, of which he was a longtime active member.

A resolution of the Georgia Senate describes Patton, accordingly: "a person of magnanimous strengths with an unimpeachable reputation for integrity, intelligence, fairness, and kindness and, by the example he made of his life, he made this world a better place in which to live."

Party political offices
Vacant Title last held by James W. Arnold	Republican Party nominee for United States Senator from Georgia (Class 3); 1968	Succeeded by Jerry Johnson
