= 2020 Camp High Harbour COVID-19 outbreak =

COVID-19 outbreak at a Georgia, USA summer camp

A summer session hosted at Camp High Harbour, a YMCA location on Lake Burton in Georgia, United States from 17 to 27 June, 2020 led to an outbreak of COVID-19 that became a super-spreader event, leading to at least 260 confirmed cases. The event garnered national and international news coverage and prompted an investigation from the US Center for Disease Control due to the unprecedented spread of COVID-19 among youth campers and staff.

== Background ==
In May of 2020, the CDC published recommendations for youth summer camps wishing to continue operations despite the lockdowns put into place March that year. These recommendations were made in addition to federal, state, and local recommendations for mitigating the spread of COVID amongst large groups of people. Amongst these were requiring a negative COVID test within 12 days of entrance, limiting crowds in enclosed spaces, opening windows and doors to improve airflow, requiring face masks for youth and staff, and enforcing social distancing.

From 17-20 June, Camp High Harbour hosted an orientation session for 138 trainees and 120 staff members, of whom the median age was 17 years old. On 21 June, 363 campers (with a median age of 12) and three senior staff members entered the camp, with the intended first session being from 20-27 June. While the camp did implement most of the CDC's recommendations, they did not follow procedures such as opening windows and doors for improved airflow or requiring cloth masks. In addition to campers dining together and staying in enclosed cabins, they also participated with staff in rigorous singing and cheering in open amphitheaters almost daily.

== Outbreak ==
On 23 June, a teenage staff member left camp after developing chills the previous evening, and tested positive the following day. The camp began sending campers home on 24 June, and on the 25 June the Georgia Department of Public Health was notified and began an investigation. The camp was closed down entirely on the 27 June.

Of the 597 Georgia residents who attended the camp during that period, 344 were tested for COVID. Of those, 260 individuals (76%) received positive test results.

== Response ==
Following the closure of Camp High Harbour and one other YMCA camp in the area, the YMCA of Metropolitan Atlanta released a statement to multiple news agencies stating they regretted their decision to open the camp that summer. They also stated that the first staff member to show symptoms and be sent home didn't exhibit any symptoms before or during entry to the camp, and tested negative prior to coming.

The quick timeline of the spread, volume of confirmed cases, and the fact that a large amount of the confirmed cases occurred amongst young children led to a CDC investigation into the incident as well as international news coverage. At the time little was known about how COVID spread, and it was assumed that the virus spread less quickly amongst youth and otherwise healthy individuals. The scale of the outbreak at the camp added to evidence that COVID-19 could also affect children in large numbers.
