= Walter F. George =

American politician (1878–1957)

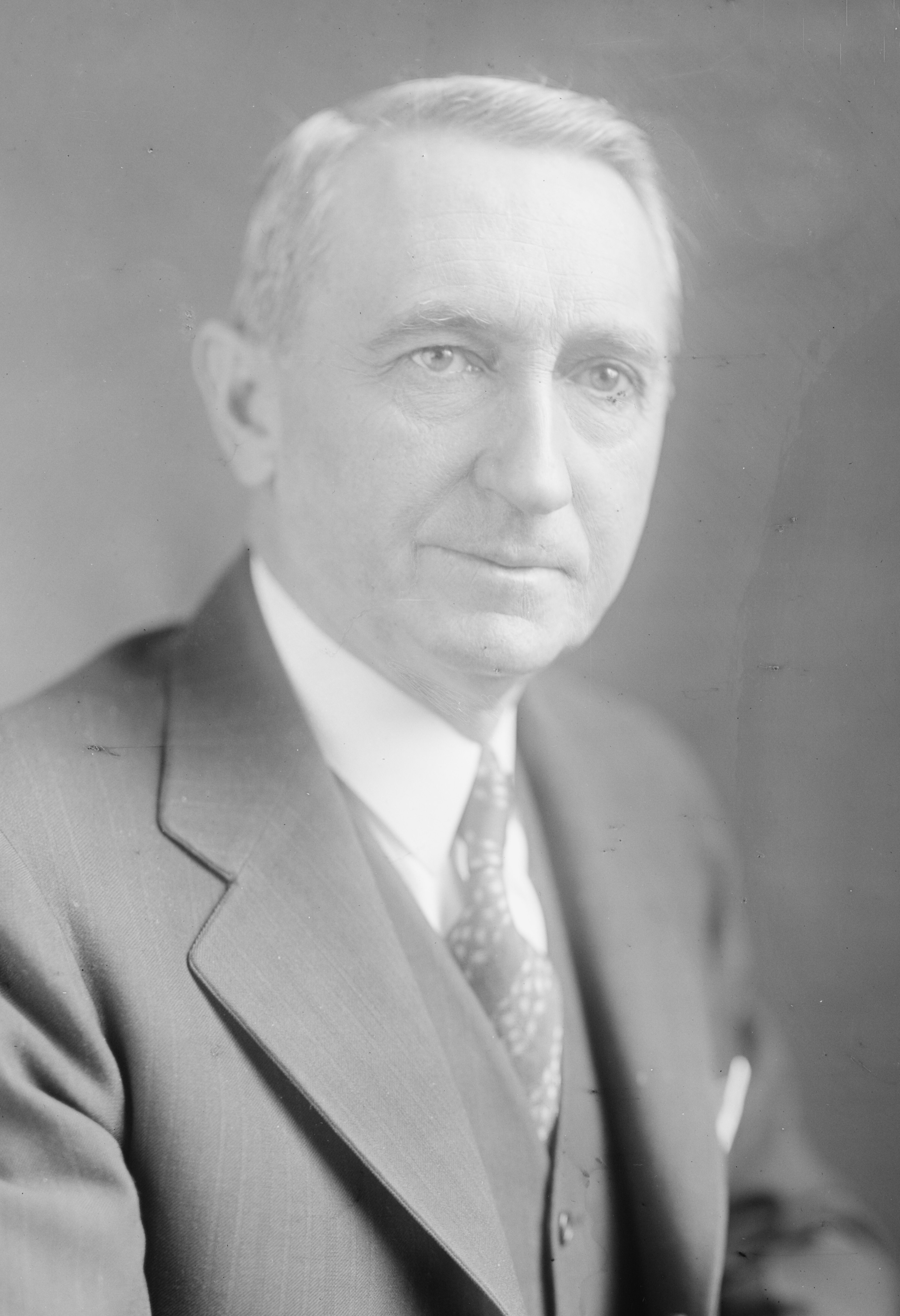
- George c. 1940

President pro tempore of the United States Senate
- In office January 5, 1955 – January 3, 1957
- Preceded by: Styles Bridges
- Succeeded by: Carl Hayden

United States Senator from Georgia
- In office November 22, 1922 – January 3, 1957
- Preceded by: Rebecca L. Felton
- Succeeded by: Herman Talmadge
Senate positions
Chair of the Senate Foreign Relations Committee
In office January 5, 1955 – January 3, 1957
Preceded by	Alexander Wiley
Succeeded by	Theodore Green
In office November 10, 1940 – January 3, 1941
Preceded by	Key Pittman
Succeeded by	Tom Connally
Chair of the Senate Finance Committee
In office January 3, 1949 – January 3, 1953
Preceded by	Eugene Millikin
Succeeded by	Eugene Millikin
In office June 22, 1941 – January 3, 1947
Preceded by	Pat Harrison
Succeeded by	Eugene Millikin

Associate Justice of the Georgia Supreme Court
- In office 1917 – 1922
- Appointed by: Hugh Dorsey
- Succeeded by: James K. Hines

Personal details
- Born: Walter Franklin George; January 29, 1878 Preston, Georgia, U.S.
- Died: August 4, 1957 (aged 79) Vienna, Georgia, U.S.
- Party: Democratic
- Spouse: Lucy Heard George
- Education: Mercer University

Walter Franklin George (January 29, 1878 – August 4, 1957) was an American politician from the state of Georgia. He was a longtime Democratic United States senator from 1922 to 1957 and was President pro tempore of the United States Senate from 1955 to 1957.

Born near Preston, Georgia, George practiced law after graduating from Mercer University. He served on the Supreme Court of Georgia from 1917 to 1922, resigning from the bench to successfully run for the Senate. Philosophically a conservative Democrat, George refrained from endorsing the 1932 presidential nomination of Franklin D. Roosevelt and openly objected to the President's 1937 court packing plan. However, despite his philosophical views, George supported much of Roosevelt's domestic policy and led the implementation of the President's foreign policy. He served as Chairman of the Senate Finance Committee from 1941 to 1946 in which he generally supported Roosevelt's handling of World War II. George also served as Chairman of the Senate Foreign Relations Committee from 1940 to 1941 and 1955 to 1957.

Throughout his political career, George was generally viewed as more moderate on civil rights than other Southern U.S. Senators. Nevertheless, George not only signed the Southern Manifesto opposing integration, he formally presented it to the Senate.

By the end of his Senate career, George was one of the most powerful U.S. Senators and was well-regarded by both political parties and by liberals and conservatives. George was an early and leading champion of vocational education, a strict constitutionalist who believed in limited federal government, a fiscal conservative. During the course of his Senate career, he transitioned from being a foreign isolationist to a fervent supporter of internationalism, including playing an important role in the Senate's 1945 approval of the United Nations Charter. George retired from the Senate in 1957 and died later that same year. Reflecting the esteem with which George was held, 40 members of Congress, including Senate Majority Leader Lyndon Johnson, attended his funeral in Vienna, Georgia, and President Dwight Eisenhower ordered flags at all U.S. federal buildings lowered to half-mast.

== Early life ==
George was born on a farm near Preston, Georgia, the son of sharecroppers Sarah (Stapleton) and Robert Theodoric George. He attended public schools and then Mercer University in Macon, Georgia. He was a member of Sigma Nu fraternity. He received his law degree from Mercer in 1901 and entered the practice of law. George served as a judge of the Georgia Court of Appeals in 1917 and as an associate justice of the Supreme Court of Georgia from 1917 to 1922. While he was a judge he was a "vociferous reader" of serious history as well as historical novels.

== Senator ==
=== 1920s ===
When Senator Thomas E. Watson died on September 26, 1922, George resigned from the Supreme Court of Georgia to run for the vacant seat. George won the resulting special election. He did not take his seat immediately when the Senate reconvened on November 21. Instead he waited one day. Thus Rebecca Latimer Felton, who had been appointed by governor Thomas W. Hardwick on October 3, could be sworn in and be the first woman seated in the Senate. Felton served one day, until George was sworn in on November 22.

George was re-elected to his first full six-year term in 1926. He served in the Senate from 1922 until 1957, declining to run for a sixth full term in 1956. In this period, the Republican Party in Georgia was very weak, so the real re-election contests for George were in the Democratic primaries.

During the 1920s, George, a Democrat, tended to vote conservatively. George supported prohibition, opposed civil rights legislation, and voted against federal anti-lynching legislation based upon his belief that the measures were unconstitutional as law enforcement was a state law matter under the Constitution. George was a strong supporter of free enterprise and business, expressing significant support for Georgia-based companies, including The Coca-Cola Company and Georgia Power. The power of free enterprise, capitalism, and markets to create jobs and raise living standards were a key tenet of George’s political philosophy.

In 1928, Georgia's congressional delegation selected George as a candidate for the Democratic presidential nomination. (Al Smith from New York received the national nomination but was soundly defeated by Republican candidate Herbert Hoover.) Even though George was never a serious candidate for the nomination, it was clear that he was very popular among his fellow Georgians.

The stock market crash of 1929 ushered in the Great Depression of the 1930s and, with it, a new era in American politics.

=== 1930s ===
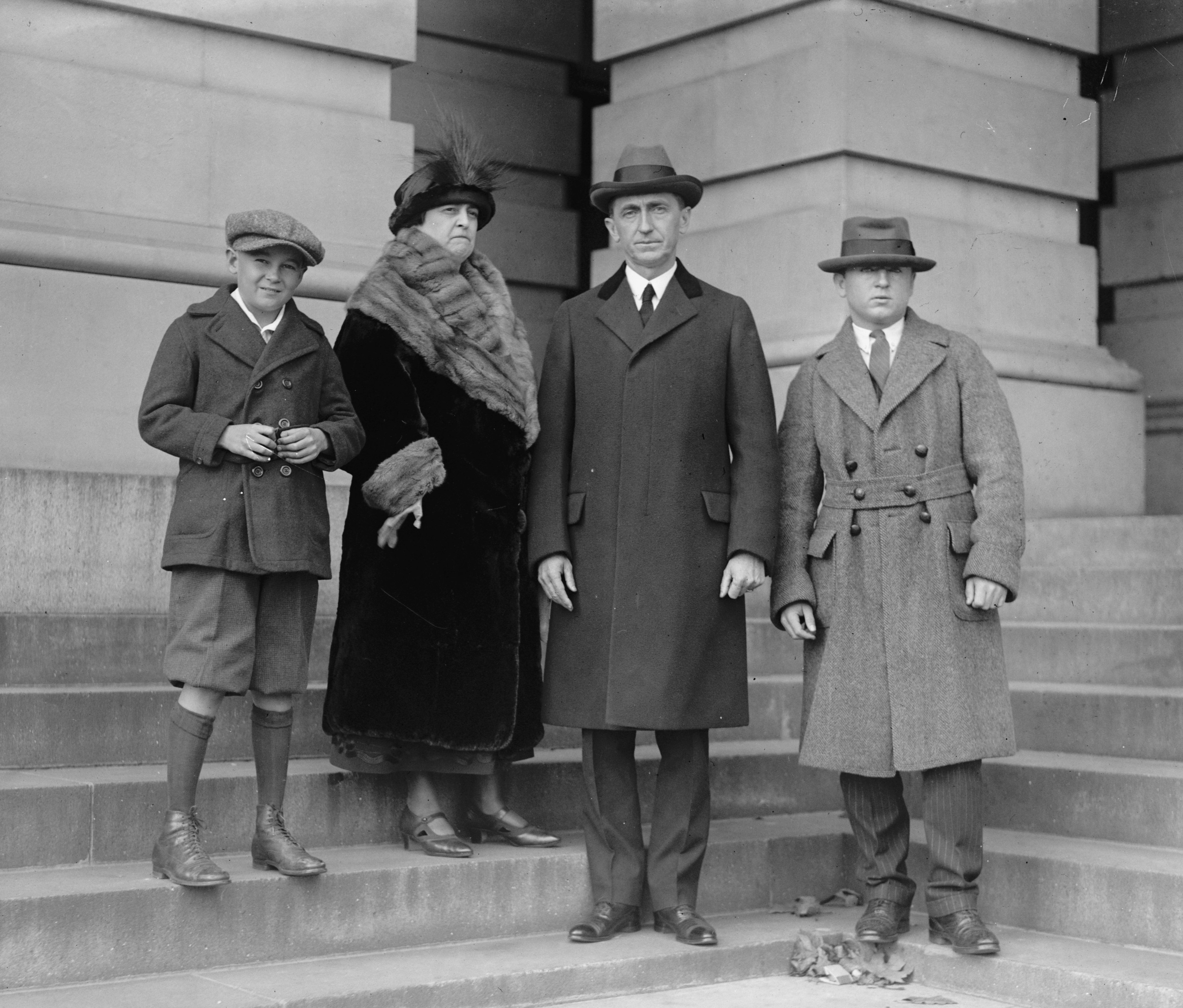
George and family posing in 1922

Despite personal visits to Franklin Roosevelt’s Warm Springs, Georgia farm, George did not endorse Roosevelt's nomination for president in 1932, declining to favor any of the Democratic candidates. George was considerably less enthusiastic about the New Deal than his fellow Georgia senator Richard B. Russell Jr., though he still supported some programs that he saw as beneficial to Georgia, primarily the Tennessee Valley Authority, Social Security, the Rural Electrification Administration, and the Agricultural Adjustment Act. He also supported several of the earlier New Deal policies and during Roosevelt's time in office, he supported 34 New Deal bills that went through the Senate, opposing only 10.

George found far more to oppose during Roosevelt's second term, however, including rigorous regulation of utility companies, the Wealth Tax Acts, and Roosevelt's attempt to pack the U.S. Supreme Court with justices favorable to his New Deal policies. Roosevelt, who considered Georgia his "second home" because of the time he spent at Warm Springs, tried hard to unseat George, who Roosevelt felt had now been "sent out to pasture." In a famous speech, delivered in Barnesville on August 11, 1938, Roosevelt praised George for his service and acknowledged his intelligence and honor but urged voters to choose George's opponent, Lawrence Camp, in the upcoming Democratic primary. George shook the president's hand and accepted the challenge.

George easily won re-nomination for his Senate seat, and with the Democratic Party firmly in control of Georgia, he easily won re-election as well.

=== 1940s ===
A confidential April 1943 analysis of the Senate Foreign Relations Committee by British scholar Isaiah Berlin, working for the British Foreign Office, stated of George:

an honourable but narrow Southern Conservative, who incurred the displeasure of the New Deal in 1938 when [an unsuccessful attempt to "purge" him was made by its then leaders (in particular, [Edward] Flynn, [Harry] Hopkins, and [Thomas] Corcoran). This attempt increased his popularity in his State and in the Senate. He left the chairmanship of the Foreign Relations Committee in order to head the equally important Finance Committee, and is an exceedingly influential figure in the Senate, and the hope of the Conservatives in many parts of the United States.

From July 31, 1941 to August 2, 1946, Senator George was the chairman of the United States Senate Committee on Finance, and one of Washington's most powerful legislative forces. As chairman of this powerful committee, George defeated many of Roosevelt's efforts to increase taxes and enact very progressive tax regimes. George and Roosevelt were in greater agreement on foreign affairs; Berlin added that "although [George] acutely dislikes the domestic policies of the Administration, he has never wavered in support of its foreign policy and, like the other cotton and tobacco Senators, supports Mr. Hull's reciprocal trade agreements". In the 1940s, George supported Roosevelt's efforts at military preparedness, including Lend-Lease aid to Great Britain, France, and the Soviet Union, already at war, and American defensive buildup in response to the threat posed by Japanese and German militarism. Once the United States entered World War II after the Japanese attack on Pearl Harbor, George embraced the president's vigorous prosecution of the war. He reversed his previous opposition to an international agency designed to keep peace by supporting the ratification of the United Nations Charter in 1945.

=== 1950s ===
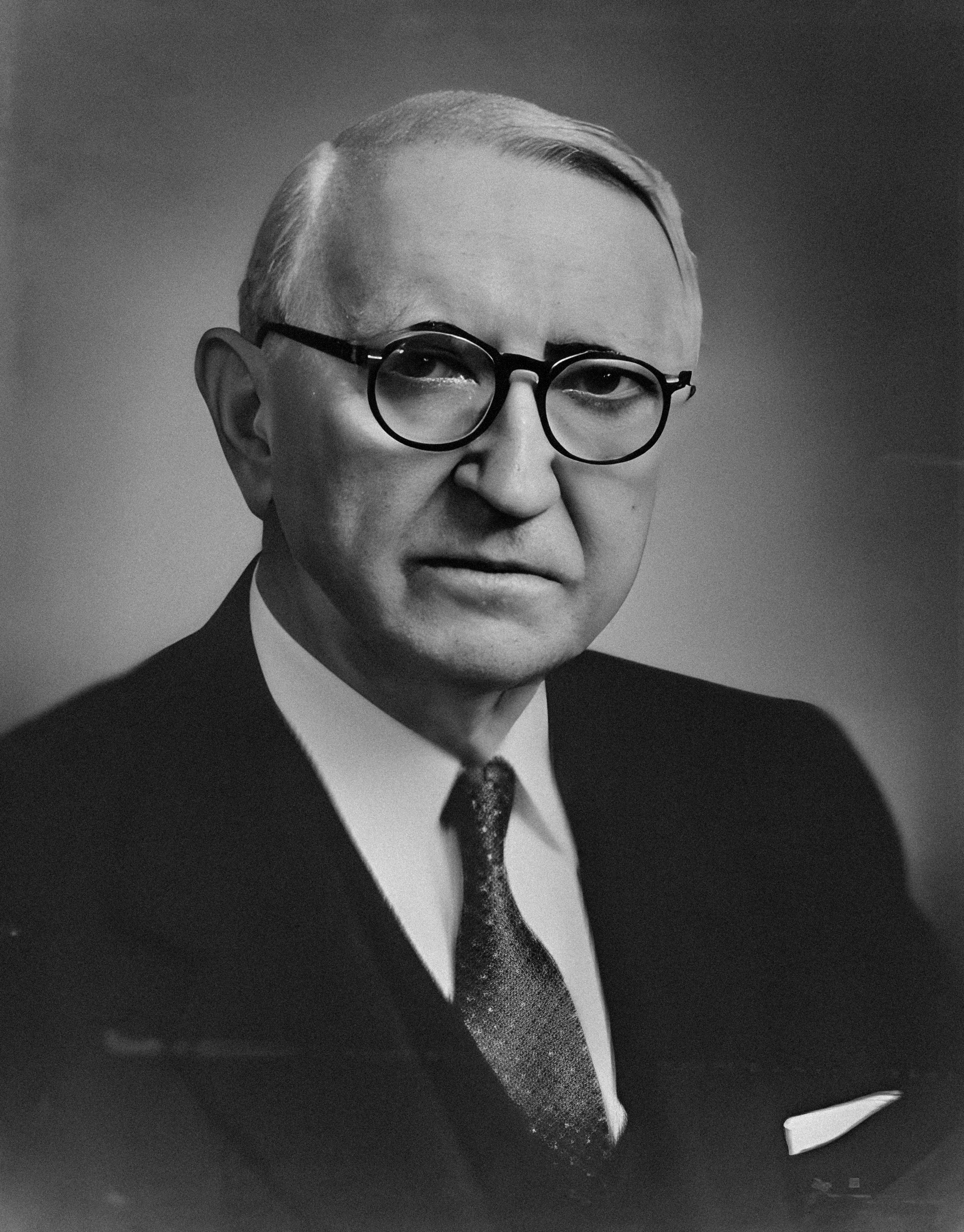
George in his later career

As the 1950s began, with thirty years of the Senate experience, George became one of the most powerful individuals in the United States, with Life magazine calling George "one of the most distinguished legislators of his time and the most revered man in the Senate" and Collier's calling him "the solemn, dignified, and well-nigh unassailable senior Senator from Georgia." Increasingly President Dwight Eisenhower began to rely heavily on George, chairman of the Senate Foreign Relations Committee, in matters related to foreign policy.

Especially after the U.S. Supreme Court's Brown v. Board of Education decisions mid-decade, legislative and political focus on civil rights increased. While George was not a racial rabble-rouser on the campaign trail as were some Southern politicians, he supported racial segregation.

In the wake of the Supreme Court's decision in Brown v. Board of Education (1954), Southern Democrats in Congress issued the Southern Manifesto ("Declaration of Constitutional Principles"), which condemned Brown as the "unwarranted decision of the Supreme Court... [that] is now bearing fruit always produced when men substitute naked power for established law."

As the senior Southern Senator, the Manifesto was physically signed in his office as Senate President pro Tempore on March 8, 1956, and he read it into the Congressional Record, so that any member could sign it before the close of legislative business on the evening of March 12. This prevented any reluctant Southerners from claiming that they did not know about the Manifesto before its formal appearance.

That fall, after thirty-four years in the U.S. Senate, George approached what would be his seventh senatorial campaign. At the age of 78, he vacillated on whether to seek re-election since he faced a strong opponent, Herman Talmadge He told President Eisenhower that "if I retire, I want to stay at home and rest. I am really tired." U.S. Senators from both political parties actively worked to encourage George’s reelection, including Minnesota's Hubert Humphrey who offered George, "represented the finest of traditions of this great deliberative body ... a profound and effective statesman ... when some of us felt too timid to speak up, this brave man spoke up." While the President and other national politicians favored George’s reelection, Talmadge had the state political machinery built by his father, Eugene, firmly behind him. Moreover, George's refusal to publicly denounce Brown v. Board of Education harmed his reelection prospects, since segregation became a primary campaign focus. Balancing his age, re-election prospects, his seniority and leadership in the Senate, the support of Georgia's businesses, and other considerations, George declined to run, realizing that his health likely would not withstand the strenuous campaign.

George was a member of twelve committees while he was in the Senate and the chairman of five, including the United States Senate Committee on Foreign Relations from 1940 to 1941 and from 1955 to 1957 and the United States Senate Committee on Finance from 1941 to 1947 and from 1949 to 1953. He was also President pro tempore of the Senate from 1955 to 1957. In the Senate, George became known for his polished oratory and was considered one of the Senate's best public speakers.

Early in 1957, shortly after George retired from the Senate, President Eisenhower appointed him special ambassador to the North Atlantic Treaty Organization. After about six months' service, George became seriously ill. He died in Vienna, Georgia and is interred in the Vienna cemetery. George was a Freemason, member of Vienna Lodge No. 324.

== Remembrances ==
The Walter F. George School of Law of Mercer University, the former Walter F. George High School (presently South Atlanta High School) in Atlanta, Georgia, and Walter F. George Lake in western Georgia were named for him. The Walter F. George Foundation, created at Mercer when the university's law school was named in honor of George in 1947, continues to award scholarships to Mercer law students who plan to pursue careers in public service. George's portrait hangs in the Georgia state capitol. A bronze bust of Sen. George was dedicated in 1950 in Vienna, Georgia. The bust was donated by the Georgia Vocational Association (now Georgia Association for Career & Technical Education) for George's support of Vocational Education and passage of the George-Deen Act.

In 1960, the United States Postal Service issued a $0.04 stamp honoring George. The place of issue was Vienna, Georgia, George's final home.

== See also ==
- Conservative Democrat

Party political offices
Preceded by Thomas E. Watson	Democratic Party nominee for United States Senator from Georgia (Class 3); 1922, 1926, 1932, 1938, 1944, 1950	Succeeded by Herman Talmadge
U.S. Senate
Preceded by Rebecca L. Felton	U.S. senator (Class 3) from Georgia; November 22, 1922 – January 3, 1957; Served alongside: William J. Harris, John S. Cohen, Richard B. Russell, Jr.	Succeeded by Herman E. Talmadge
Political offices
Preceded by Key Pittman	Chairman of the Senate Foreign Relations Committee; 1940–1941	Succeeded by Tom Connally
Preceded by Pat Harrison	Chairman of the Senate Finance Committee; 1941–1947	Succeeded by Eugene D. Millikin
Preceded by Eugene D. Millikin	Chairman of the Senate Finance Committee; 1949–1953	Succeeded by Eugene D. Millikin
Preceded by Alexander Wiley	Chairman of the Senate Foreign Relations Committee; 1955–1957	Succeeded by Theodore F. Green
Preceded by Styles Bridges	President pro tempore of the United States Senate; January 5, 1955 – January 3, 1957	Succeeded by Carl Hayden
Honorary titles
Preceded by Kenneth McKellar	Dean of the United States Senate; January 3, 1953 – January 3, 1957	Succeeded by Carl Hayden
