= 1956 United States Senate election in Georgia =

1956 U.S. Senate Democratic primary in Georgia
- September 12, 1956
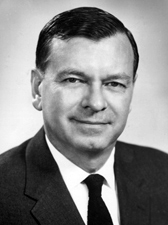

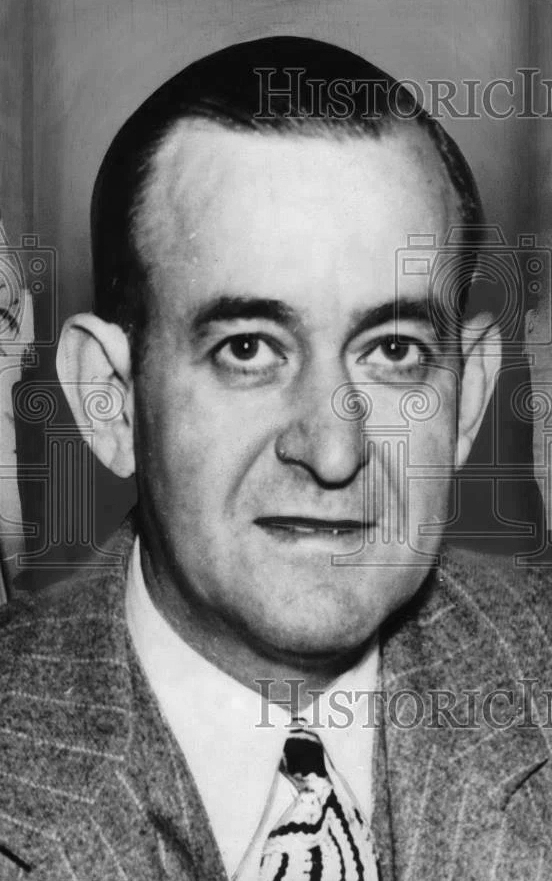
| Nominee | Herman Talmadge | Melvin E. Thompson |
| Party | Democratic | Democratic |
| Electoral vote | 410 | 0 |
| Popular vote | 498,327 | 122,152 |
| Percentage | 80.31% | 19.69% |
U.S. senator before election
Walter F. George
Democratic
Elected U.S. Senator
Herman Talmadge
Democratic

The 1956 United States Senate election in Georgia took place on November 6, 1956. Incumbent Democratic U.S. Senator Walter F. George did not run for re-election.

The open race for George's seat was the final chapter in the political rivalry between former Georgia Governor Herman Talmadge and Melvin Thompson which had begun a decade earlier with the three governors controversy. Talmadge soundly won the primary, ending Thompson's political career.

At this time, Georgia was a one-party state. Talmadge's victory in the September 12 primary was tantamount to election, and he was unopposed in the general election, which, alongside a concurrent election in South Carolina, is the last time a non-incumbent was unopposed in a United States Senate election.

== Democratic primary ==
=== County unit system ===
From 1917 until 1962, the Democratic Party in the U.S. state of Georgia used a voting system called the county unit system to determine victors in statewide primary elections.

The system was ostensibly designed to function similarly to the Electoral College, but in practice the large ratio of unit votes for small, rural counties to unit votes for more populous urban areas provided outsized political influence to the smaller counties.

Under the county unit system, the 159 counties in Georgia were divided by population into three categories. The largest eight counties were classified as "Urban", the next-largest 30 counties were classified as "Town", and the remaining 121 counties were classified as "Rural". Urban counties were given 6 unit votes, Town counties were given 4 unit votes, and Rural counties were given 2 unit votes, for a total of 410 available unit votes. Each county's unit votes were awarded on a winner-take-all basis.

Candidates were required to obtain a majority of unit votes (not necessarily a majority of the popular vote), or 206 total unit votes, to win the election. If no candidate received a majority in the initial primary, a runoff election was held between the top two candidates to determine a winner.

=== Candidates ===
- Herman Talmadge, former Governor
- Melvin E. Thompson, former Governor

=== Results ===
Democratic primary
| Candidate | Votes | % | CUV |
|---|---|---|---|
| Herman Talmadge | 498,327 | 80.31 | 410 |
| Melvin E. Thompson | 122,152 | 19.69 | 0 |
| Write-ins | 13 | 0.00 | 0 |

== General election ==
=== Results ===
1956 U.S. Senate election in Georgia
| Party | Candidate | Votes | % | ±% |
|---|---|---|---|---|
| Democratic | Herman Talmadge | 541,094 | 99.97% | ▼0.03 |
| Write-in | | 173 | 0.03% | |
| Total votes | | 541,267 | 100.00% | |
| Democratic hold | | Swing | | |

== See also ==
- 1956 United States Senate elections

== Bibliography ==
- Congressional Elections, 1946-1996. Washington, D.C.: Congressional Quarterly Inc. 1998. ISBN 1-56802-248-4.
- Scammon, Richard M., ed. (1964). America Votes 5: a handbook of contemporary American election statistics, 1962. Washington, D.C.: Governmental Affairs Institute.
- Compiled by Mrs. Mary Givens Bryan, Director (1956). Georgia's Official Register, 1955-1956 (PDF). Atlanta, Georgia: State of Georgia, Department of Archives and History.
