= 1950 United States Senate election in Georgia =

1950 U.S. Senate Democratic primary in Georgia
- June 28, 1950
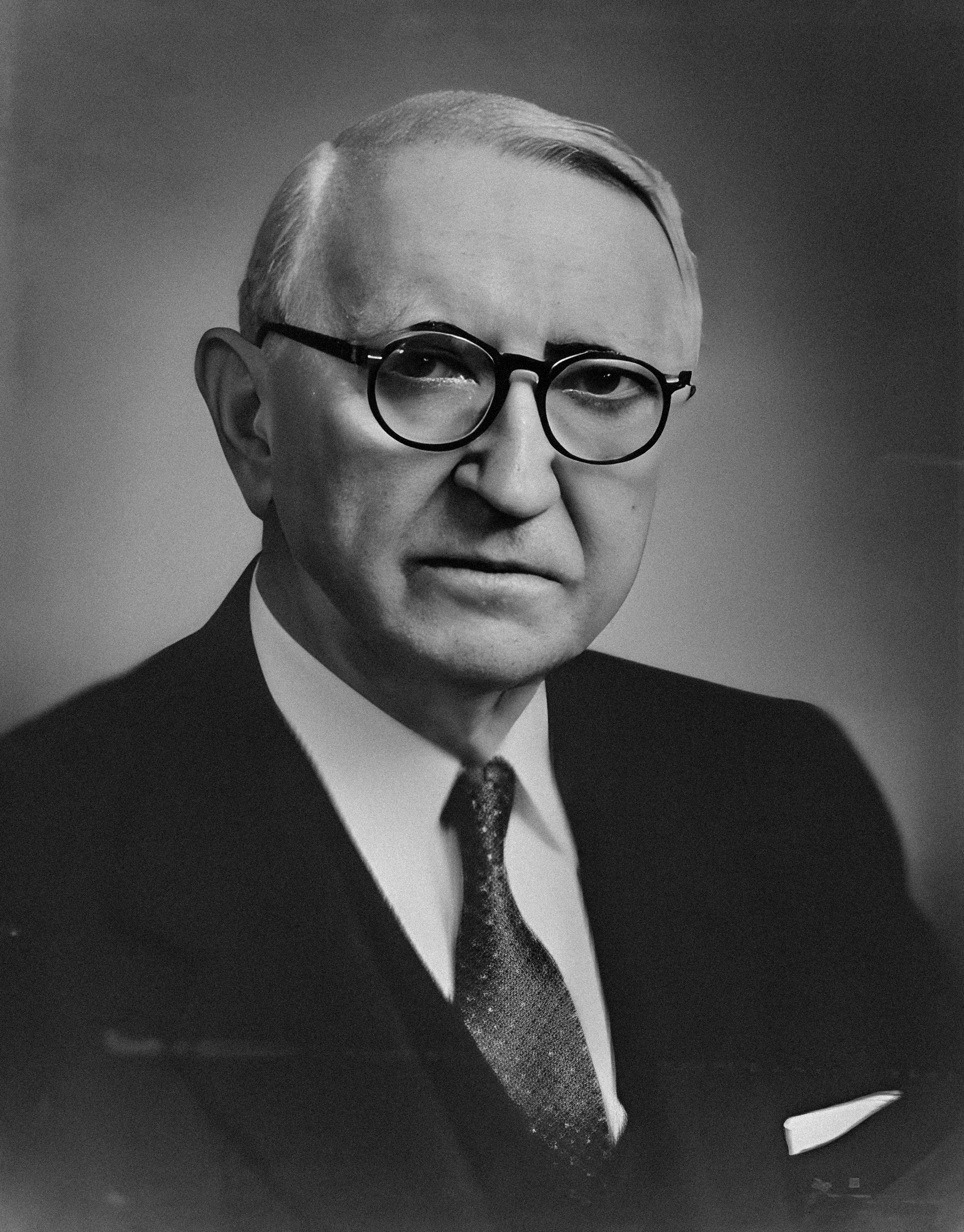

Nominee	Walter F. George	Alex McLennan
Party	Democratic	Democratic
Electoral vote	410	0
Popular vote	470,156	79,886
Percentage	82.50%	14.02%
U.S. senator before election
Walter F. George
Democratic
Elected U.S. Senator
Walter F. George
Democratic

The 1950 United States Senate election in Georgia took place on November 7, 1950. Incumbent Democratic U.S. Senator Walter F. George was re-elected to a sixth term in office.

As was common at the time, the Democratic candidate ran with no opposition in the general election so therefore the Democratic primary was the real contest, and winning the primary was considered tantamount to election.

== Democratic primary ==
=== County unit system ===
From 1917 until 1962, the Democratic Party in the U.S. state of Georgia used a voting system called the county unit system to determine victors in statewide primary elections.

The system was ostensibly designed to function similarly to the Electoral College, but in practice the large ratio of unit votes for small, rural counties to unit votes for more populous urban areas provided outsized political influence to the smaller counties.

Under the county unit system, the 159 counties in Georgia were divided by population into three categories. The largest eight counties were classified as "Urban", the next-largest 30 counties were classified as "Town", and the remaining 121 counties were classified as "Rural". Urban counties were given 6 unit votes, Town counties were given 4 unit votes, and Rural counties were given 2 unit votes, for a total of 410 available unit votes. Each county's unit votes were awarded on a winner-take-all basis.

Candidates were required to obtain a majority of unit votes (not necessarily a majority of the popular vote), or 206 total unit votes, to win the election. If no candidate received a majority in the initial primary, a runoff election was held between the top two candidates to determine a winner.

=== Candidates ===
- Walter F. George, incumbent U.S. Senator
- Harry L. Hyde
- Alex McLennan, attorney

=== Results ===
Democratic primary
Candidate	Votes	%	CUV
Walter F. George	470,156	82.50	410
Alex McLennan	79,886	14.02	0
Harry L. Hyde	19,852	3.48	0

== General election ==
=== Results ===
1950 U.S. Senate election in Georgia
Party	Candidate	Votes	%	±%
Democratic	Walter F. George (incumbent)	261,290	100.00%	
Write-ins		3	0.00%	
Total votes		261,293	100.00%	
Democratic hold		Swing		

== See also ==
- 1950 United States Senate elections

== Bibliography ==
- Congressional Elections, 1946-1996. Washington, D.C.: Congressional Quarterly Inc. 1998. ISBN 1-56802-248-4.
- Scammon, Richard M., ed. (1964). America Votes 5: a handbook of contemporary American election statistics, 1962. Washington, D.C.: Governmental Affairs Institute.
- Compiled by Mrs. J. E. Hays, State Historian and Director (1950). Georgia's Official Register, 1945-1950 (PDF). Atlanta, Georgia: State of Georgia, Department of Archives and History.
- Compiled by Mrs. Mary Givens Bryan, State Historian and Director (1952). Georgia's Official Register, 1951-1952 (PDF). Atlanta, Georgia: State of Georgia, Department of Archives and History.
