= Moccasin Creek State Park =

State park in Clarkesville, Georgia, United States

- IUCN category V (protected landscape/seascape)
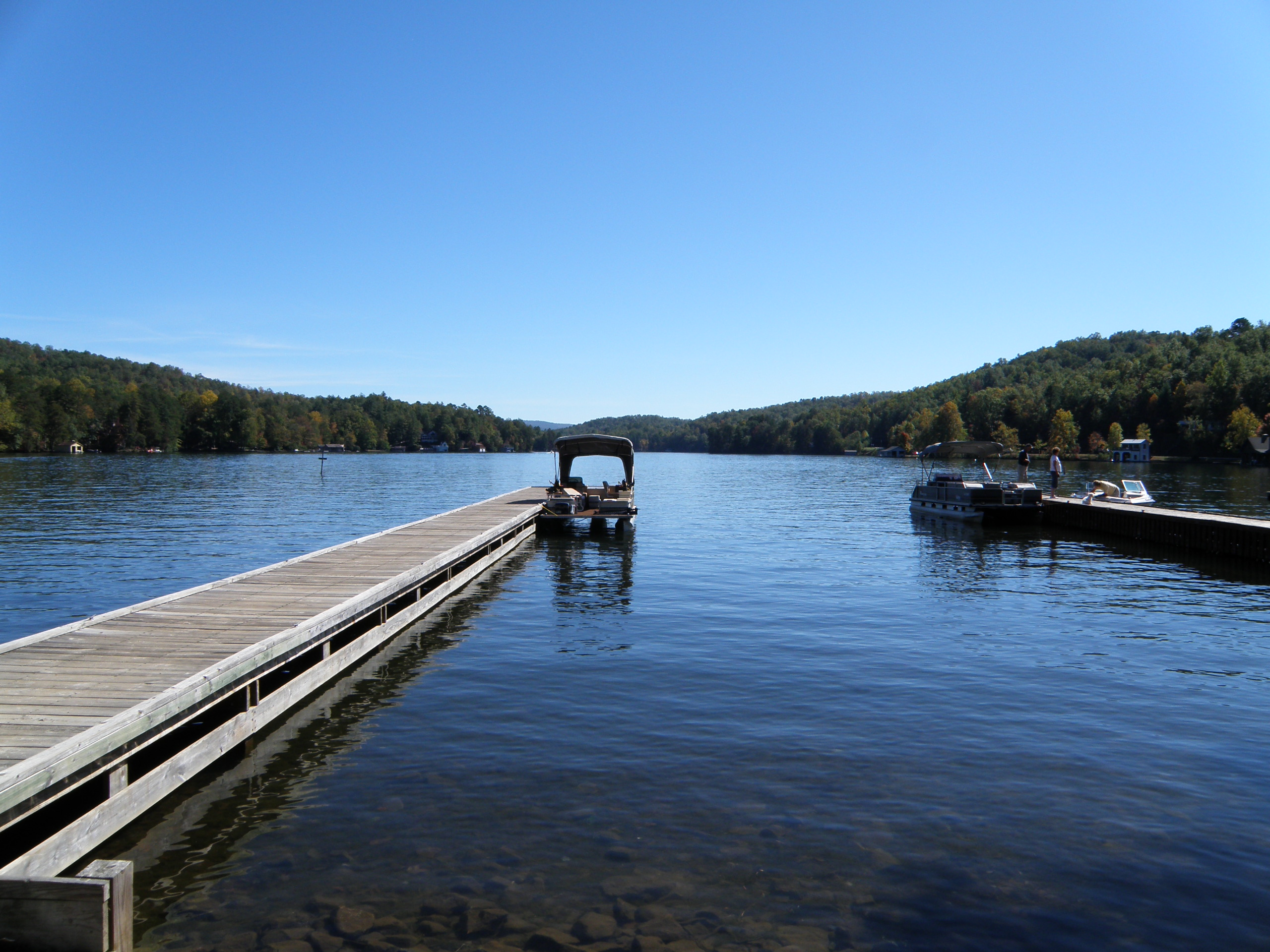
- Lake Burton, Moccasin Creek State Park
- Interactive map of Moccasin Creek State Park
- Location: Rabun County, Georgia, U.S.
- Nearest city: Clarkesville, Georgia
- Coordinates: 34.84462°N 83.58768°W
- Area: 32 acres (0 km^{2})
- Established: 1963
- Governing body: Georgia Department of Natural Resources
- Website: gastateparks.org/MoccasinCreek

Moccasin Creek State Park is a 32-acre (13 ha) state park located on the western shore of Lake Burton in Rabun County in the northeast corner of Georgia. The park features campgrounds; a fishing pier for the physically disabled, the elderly, and children; and walking trails. Even though the surrounding area is mountainous, the camping area is relatively flat.

== History ==
Moccasin Creek State Park, situated in the Chattahoochee-Oconee National Forest, was established in 1963 as a simple campground, the result of a vision of then-Director of the Georgia Game and Fish Commission, Fulton Lovell. The 32-acre (13 ha) tract was purchased for $63,415 and the park was originally run by the adjacent Lake Burton Fish Hatchery. The new camping area immediately became popular with area boaters and fishermen. Just three years after it was established, the campground was turned over to the State Parks Department because it was too busy for Fish Hatchery personnel to manage. Renamed Moccasin Creek State Park, in 1966, it is Georgia's smallest state park, and is considered to be one of Georgia's top destination for camping, hiking and fishing. In 1993, a lakeside pavilion at the park was named the Fulton Lovell Assembly Shelter in honor of Fulton Lovell.

== Location ==
The park is located on Georgia State Route 197, 20 miles (32 km) north of Clarkesville, Georgia. The adjacent Lake Burton Fish Hatchery offers an opportunity to learn how trout are raised. The park offers easy access to the Chattahoochee National Forest and its features, such as the Appalachian Trail.

== Facilities ==
- 32 Acres
- 48 Tent, Trailer, RV Campsites
- Boat Dock and Ramp
- Wheelchair-Accessible Fishing Pier
- Playground
- 1 Picnic Shelter
- Fulton Lovell Assembly Shelter
- 1-Mile Non-Game Interpretive Trail with Wildlife Observation Tower

== Annual events ==
- Moonshine Memories (September)
- Bluegrass in the Park (October)
