= 1938 United States Senate election in Georgia =

1938 U.S. Senate Democratic primary in Georgia
- September 14, 1938
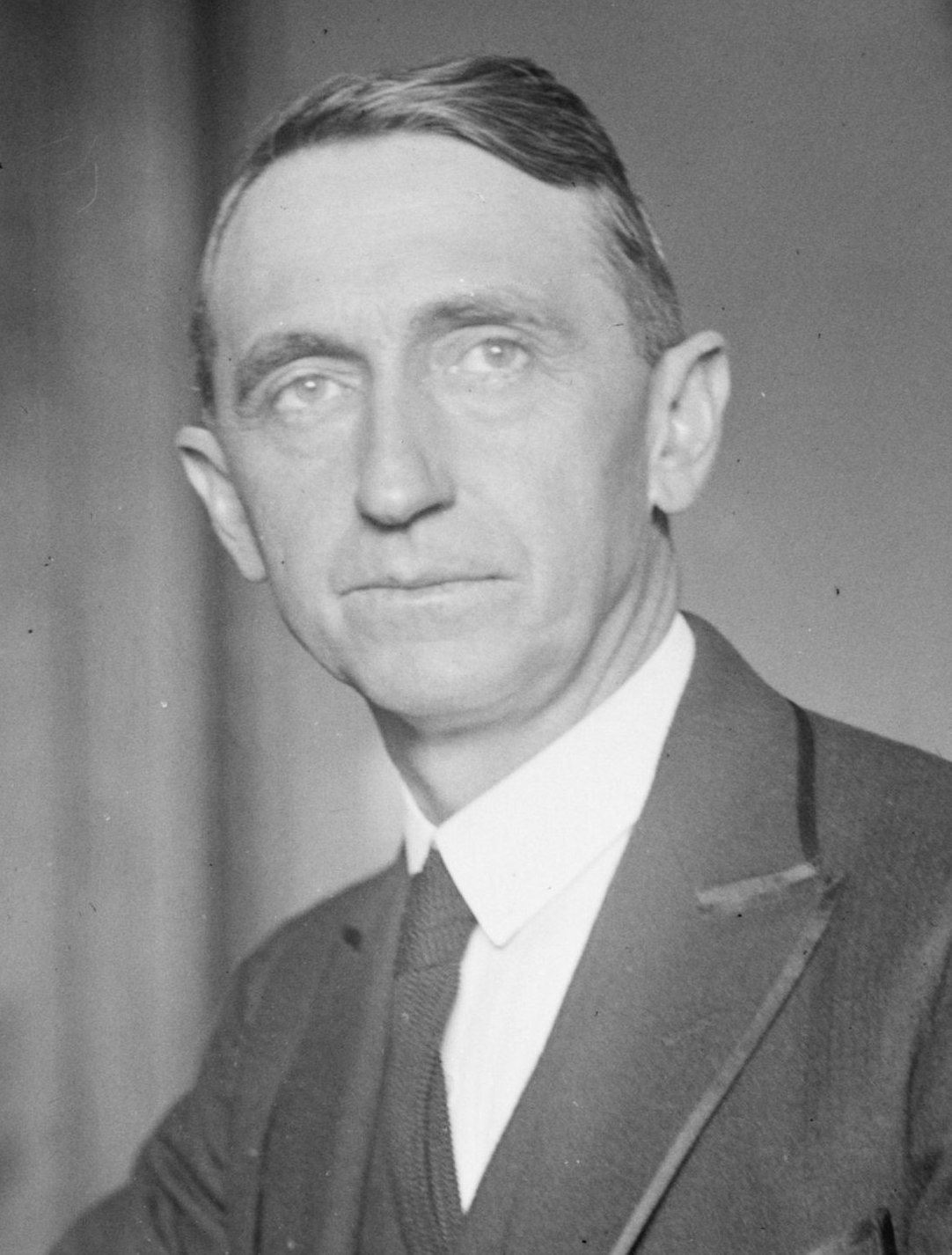

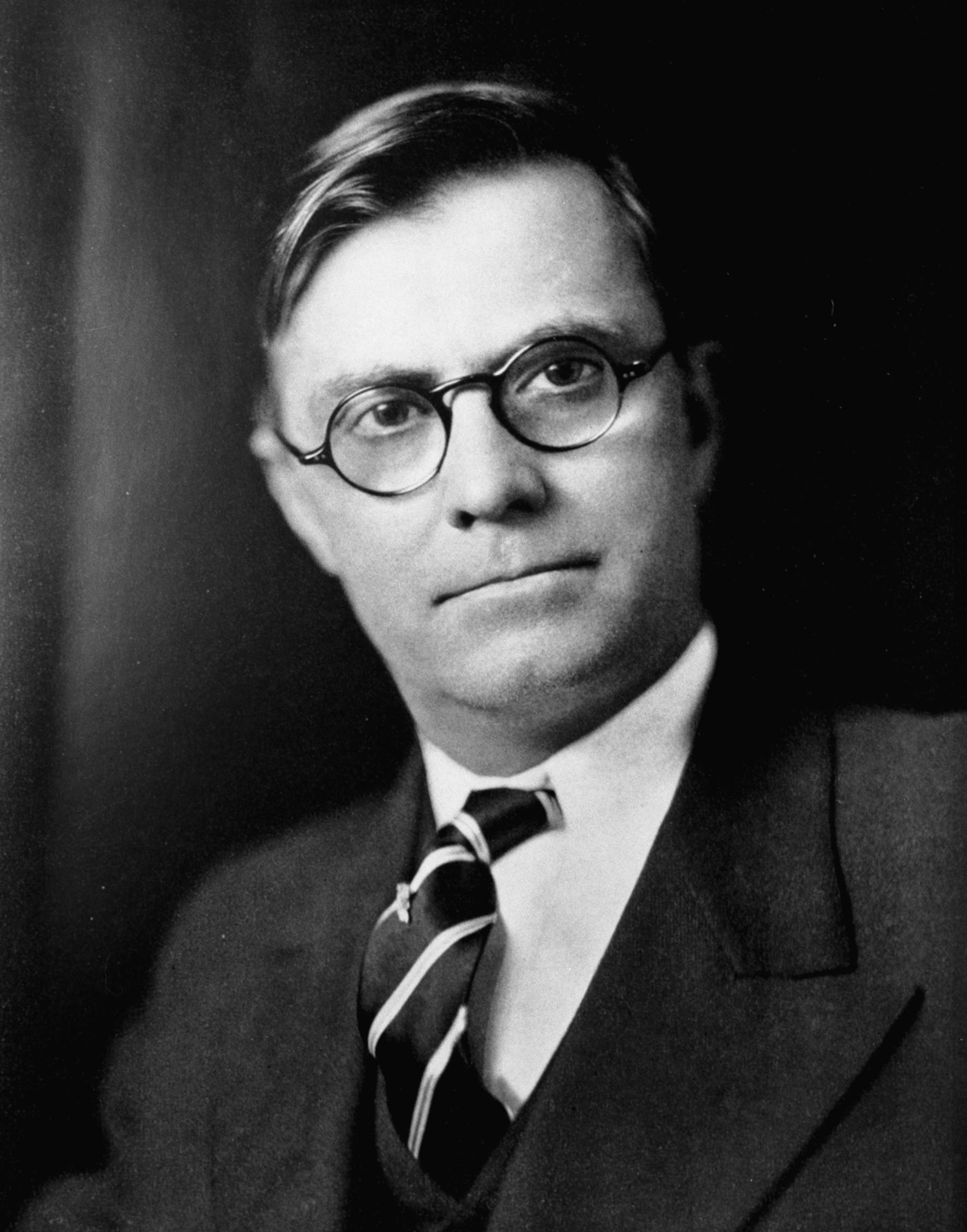

Nominee	Walter F. George	Eugene Talmadge	Lawrence Camp
Party	Democratic	Democratic	Democratic
Electoral vote	242	148	20
Popular vote	141,235	103,075	76,778
Percentage	43.96%	32.08%	23.90%
- County results George: 30–40% 40–50% 50–60% 60–70% 70–80% Talmadge: 30–40% 40–50% 50–60% 60–70% Camp: 30–40% 40–50% 50–60% 60–70%
U.S. senator before election
Walter F. George
Democratic
Elected U.S. Senator
Walter F. George
Democratic

The 1938 United States Senate election in Georgia took place on November 8, 1938. Incumbent Democratic U.S. Senator Walter F. George was re-elected to a third term in office, holding off a primary challenge from Eugene Talmadge and Lawrence Camp. At this time, Georgia was a one-party state. George's victory in the September 14 primary was tantamount to election, and he had only nominal opposition in the general election.

The primary challenge to George was, along with challenges in South Carolina and Maryland, part of President Franklin D. Roosevelt's failed attempt to purge his party of conservatives.

== Democratic primary ==
=== Background ===
From 1917 until 1962, the Democratic Party in the U.S. state of Georgia used a voting system called the county unit system to determine victors in statewide primary elections.

The system was ostensibly designed to function similarly to the Electoral College, but in practice the large ratio of unit votes for small, rural counties to unit votes for more populous urban areas provided outsized political influence to the smaller counties.

Under the county unit system, the 159 counties in Georgia were divided by population into three categories. The largest eight counties were classified as "Urban", the next-largest 30 counties were classified as "Town", and the remaining 121 counties were classified as "Rural". Urban counties were given 6 unit votes, Town counties were given 4 unit votes, and Rural counties were given 2 unit votes, for a total of 410 available unit votes. Each county's unit votes were awarded on a winner-take-all basis.

Candidates were required to obtain a majority of unit votes (not necessarily a majority of the popular vote), or 206 total unit votes, to win the election. If no candidate received a majority in the initial primary, a runoff election was held between the top two candidates to determine a winner.

=== Candidates ===
- Lawrence S. Camp, U.S. Attorney for the Northern District of Georgia and former Attorney General of Georgia
- Walter F. George, incumbent U.S. Senator since 1922
- W. G. McRae
- Eugene Talmadge, former Governor of Georgia

=== Campaign ===
Senator Walter F. George, a member of the conservative Southern wing of the Democratic Party, was not initially opposed to President Franklin Delano Roosevelt's New Deal and voted in favor of many of its programs, but spoke out against Roosevelt's plan to pack the Supreme Court and joined Senate opposition to the administration in Roosevelt's second term.

Unlike some conservatives, George had a generally friendly relationship with the President, who had made Warm Springs, Georgia his second home for many years. On a March 1938 trip to Warm Springs, Roosevelt stopped in Gainesville to survey rebuilding efforts in the wake of two tornadoes. There, George praised Roosevelt's commitment to the reconstruction of the city and referred to him as "the greatest leader among English-speaking people at this hour anywhere on earth!" When Roosevelt delivered a speech of his own, he referenced his ongoing efforts to purge the Democratic Party, especially in the "feudal" South, of conservatives and pointedly made no mention of George.

The chief challenger to George was former Governor Eugene Talmadge, a vocal racist and opponent of the New Deal who denounced the whole program as one designed for "loafers and bums." Just fifteen minutes before the June 1 filing deadline, Lawrence Camp entered the race as a third candidate at the behest of presidential aide Marvin H. McIntyre.

After Roosevelt announced his planned purge in June, George wrote to him, "I hasten to assure you that I have never meant to be offensive to you. ... I am unwilling to have you think I have ... at any time felt anything but deep affection for you." Though Roosevelt expressed his appreciation, he told George that his conservatism would "destroy the Party in a few years, and second, jeopardize the Nation and its government." He privately told aides he would endorse an opponent in any case, even "if I have to pick my tenant farmer, Moore!"

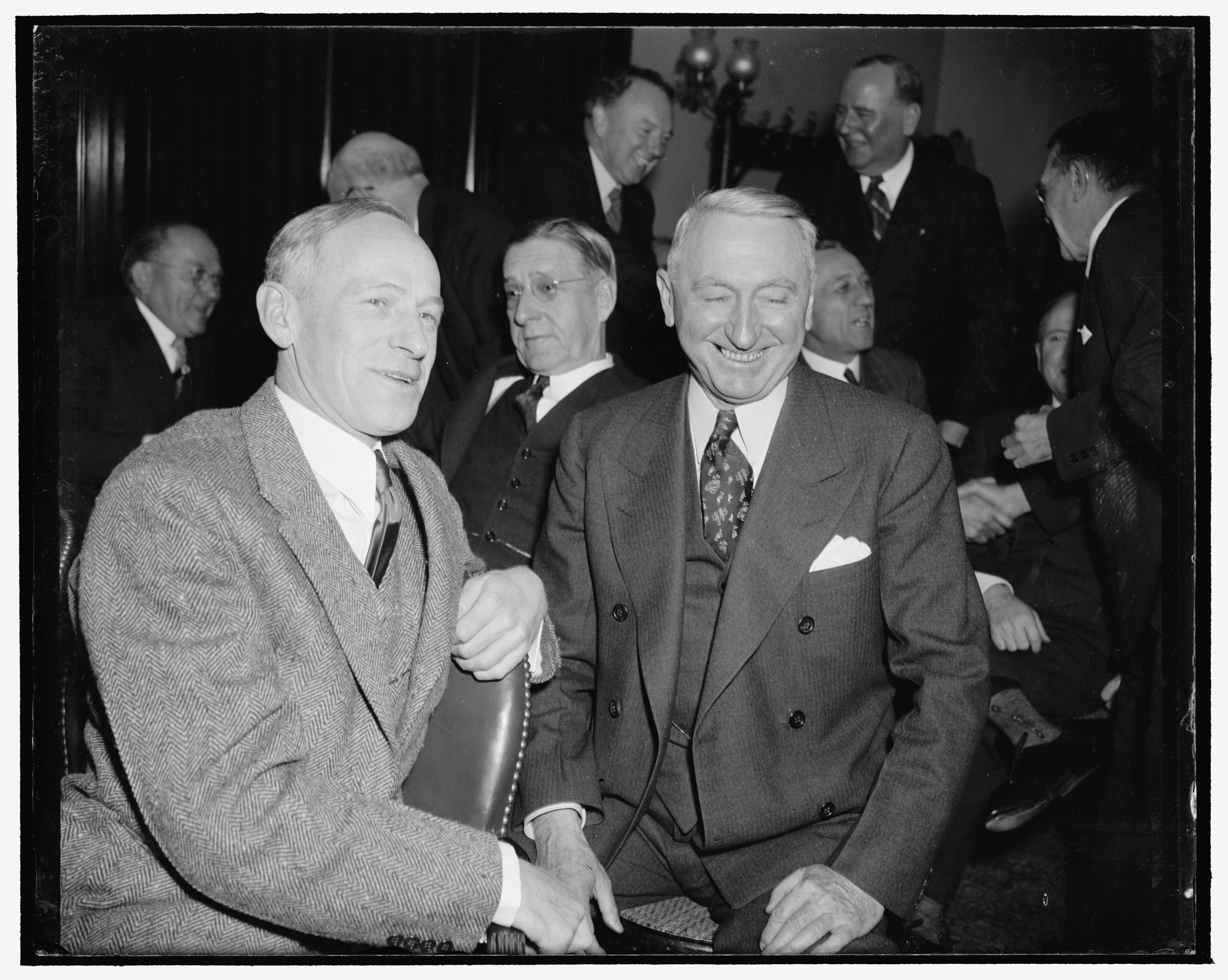
Senator George (right) with Senator Millard Tydings. Both were targets of a failed purge of conservatives from the Democratic Party by President Franklin D. Roosevelt.

Despite Roosevelt's opposition, George was a heavy favorite for re-election, and his chief opponent, Eugene Talmadge, was not a Roosevelt ally. There was speculation that Roosevelt would remain out of the race, as he had in other states where anti-New Deal incumbents appeared invulnerable.

On August 10, Roosevelt met with his political advisors and Lawrence Camp at Warm Springs to outline strategy. At a luncheon the next day with Governor Eurith D. Rivers, Roosevelt introduced Camp as "a gentleman who I hope will be the next Senator from this State," beginning an unplanned campaign through the state for Camp.

On August 12, Roosevelt delivered a scheduled speech in Barnesville on the Rural Electrification Administration. Both Camp and Senator George were onstage but made no remarks. Roosevelt ended his speech by praising George as a friend and "a gentleman and a scholar." Nevertheless, he proceeded to take aim: "[Senator George] cannot possibly in my judgment be classified as belonging to the liberal school of thought." He denounced Talmadge as a candidate who would "contribute very little to practical progress in government" and praised Camp as "a man who is willing to fight [to improve the economic and social conditions of the country]." George shook Roosevelt's hand, loudly accepting the challenge "in the friendly spirit it was given." In the evening, he spoke at the University of Georgia, calling for "constant progressive action" in an implied criticism of George and Talmadge.

Most public commentary defended George against Roosevelt's criticism; a Gallup poll found that despite his overwhelming popularity, 75 percent of Georgia voters disapproved of his campaigning in the state. Many newspapers and commenters also criticized Roosevelt as a Northern intruder into Southern politics.

George, facing his first contested primary since 1926, campaigned as a "full-time Georgian," in contrast to Roosevelt's "part-time" status. He boasted endorsements from the national and state Federations of Labor and funding from Roosevelt ally Bernard Baruch. Despite Roosevelt's own position, George asserted that he was a supporter of both the New Deal and Roosevelt personally. He insisted the President had been "misinformed" and would only criticize Roosevelt as representative of outside interference in Georgia politics.

Talmadge likewise campaigned as personally supportive of Roosevelt but opposed to his administration's "communistic, free-spending" policies, which he blamed on "[Agriculture Secretary Henry] Wallace, [Rexford] Tugwell, [Felix] Frankfurter, and [Interior Secretary Harold] Ickes."

Camp's campaign suffered from the start; Camp himself had little charisma, Roosevelt's unanticipated endorsement was not broadcast on radio, Senator Richard B. Russell and Governor Rivers declined to back him for fear of alienating George, and he had little support by way of newspaper endorsements or money. With little support in the state, the Roosevelt administration sent Joseph B. Keenan and Clark Foreman to run his campaign.

All three candidates denounced the anti-lynching legislation being debated in Congress. George campaigned actively on his one-hour filibuster of the bill, while Camp criticized him for missing the final vote. George also campaigned on the fact that Roosevelt had sent Foreman, a member of the Commission on Inter-Racial Cooperation, to campaign on Camp's behalf.

=== Results ===
In the county unit totals, George won 242 to Talmadge's 148. Camp took the remaining 20. Camp failed to carry his home county of Fulton but did carry Warm Springs.

Candidate	Popular vote		County unit vote	
Candidate	Votes	%	Votes	%
Walter F. George	141,235	43.96	242	59.02
Eugene Talmadge	103,075	32.08	148	36.10
Lawrence S. Camp	76,778	23.90	20	4.88
W. G. McRae	223	0.07		
Total	321,311	100.00	410	100.00

=== Aftermath ===
Talmadge refused to concede, citing evidence of fraud in thirty counties. By December, Talmadge had evidently conceded, praising George and Russell as "the two best senators in the United States!"

George, the chair of the Senate Foreign Relations Committee, soon reconciled with Roosevelt in advance of World War II. He served as a key legislative shepherd of administration foreign policy, including the Lend-Lease Act.

== General election ==
=== Results ===
1938 United States Senate election in Georgia
Party	Candidate	Votes	%	±%
Democratic	Walter F. George	66,987	95.11%	▲0.03
Independent	Charles A. Jiles	3,442	4.89%	N/A
Total votes		70,429	100.00%	
Democratic hold		Swing		

== See also ==
- 1938 United States Senate elections
