= 1974 United States Senate election in Georgia =

- November 5, 1974
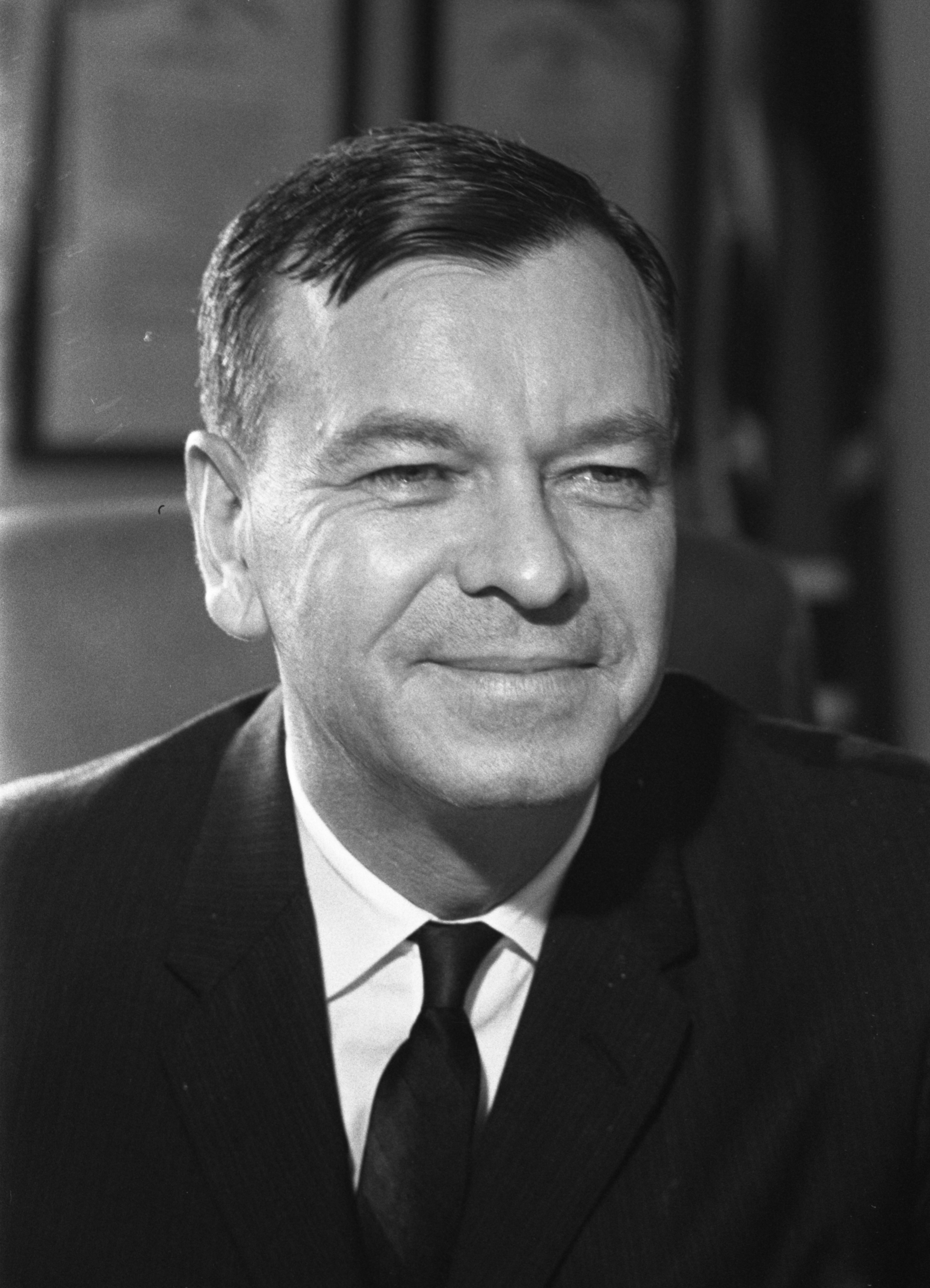

Nominee	Herman Talmadge	Jerry R. Johnson
Party	Democratic	Republican
Popular vote	627,376	246,865
Percentage	71.76%	28.24%
- County results Talmadge: 50–60% 60–70% 70–80% 80–90% >90%
U.S. senator before election
Herman Talmadge
Democratic
Elected U.S. Senator
Herman Talmadge
Democratic

The 1974 United States Senate election in Georgia took place on November 5, 1974. Incumbent Democratic U.S. Senator Herman Talmadge was re-elected to a fourth consecutive term in office, winning large victories in the primary and general elections.

This was the last time a Democrat won re-election to the Class 3 seat in Georgia until 2022.

== Democratic primary ==
=== Candidates ===
- Carlton Myers, Pine Mountain veterinarian
- Herman Talmadge, incumbent U.S. senator since 1953

=== Results ===
Democratic primary results
Party	Candidate	Votes	%
Democratic	Herman Talmadge (incumbent)	523,133	81.47%
Democratic	Carlton Myers	119,011	18.53%
Total votes		642,144	100.00%

== General election ==
=== Results ===
1974 United States Senate election in Georgia
Party	Candidate	Votes	%	±%
Democratic	Herman Talmadge (incumbent)	627,376	71.76%	▼5.75
Republican	Jerry R. Johnson	246,865	28.24%	▲5.75
Total votes		874,241	100.00%	
Democratic hold		Swing		

== See also ==
- 1974 United States Senate elections
