= Dan MacIntyre =

American politician (1917–1969)

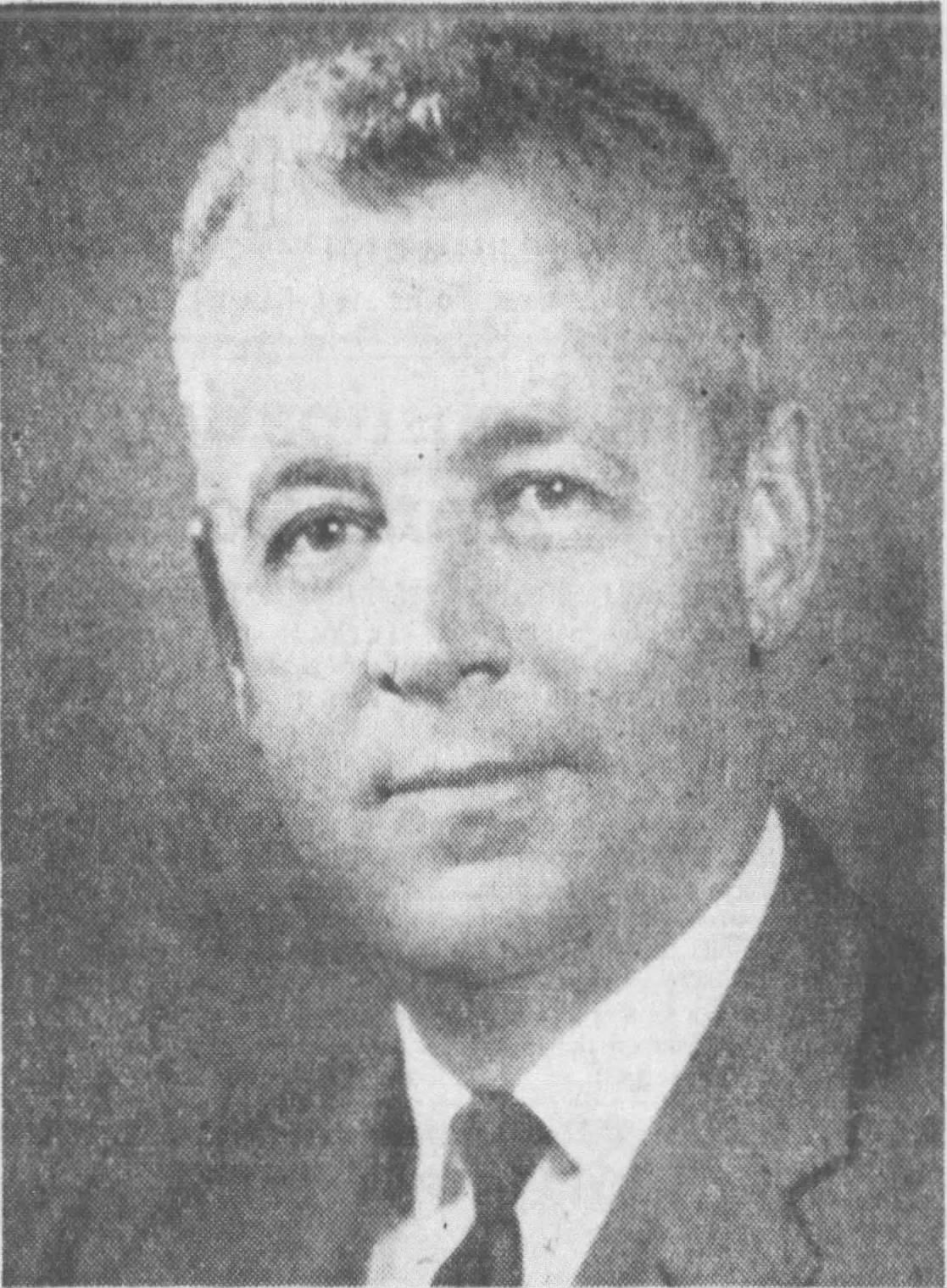

Member of the Georgia Senate from the 40th district
- In office January 14, 1963 – April 6, 1969
- Preceded by: Zell Miller
- Succeeded by: E. Earl Patton

Personal details
- Born: May 17, 1917 Atlanta, Georgia, U.S.
- Died: April 6, 1969 (aged 51) Atlanta, Georgia, U.S.
- Party: Republican
- Spouse: Marjorie Ward (m. 1941)
- Children: 3
- Education: Georgia Tech

Military service
- Branch/service: United States Navy
- Rank: Lieutenant
- Battles/wars: World War II; Pacific Theater; Caribbean Theater

Daniel Irwin MacIntyre III (May 17, 1917 – April 6, 1969) was an American businessman and politician from Georgia. He served in the Georgia State Senate from 1963 to 1969.

== Early life ==
MacIntyre was born on May 17, 1917, in Atlanta, Georgia. He graduated high school in 1936, and in 1940 from Georgia Tech. After graduating from Georgia Tech, he joined his family insurance firm. During World War II, he served in the United States Navy in the Pacific Theater and the Caribbean, where he served as a communication officer on an attack transport. He was promoted to lieutenant.

== Political career ==
MacIntyre first ran for office in 1961 for the Atlanta Board of Education from the Eighth Ward. He was the only male candidate in the race, running against two incumbent women and was defeated. In 1962, he ran for the Senate's 40th district and won. His district encompassed most of Northside Atlanta and all of Fulton County north of the city. He would serve four more terms until his premature death. He was succeeded by E. Earl Patton.

== Personal life ==
He married his wife Marjorie Ward, on May 26, 1941. Together, they had three children. He died on April 6, 1969, aged 51 due to a heart attack.
