= Herman Talmadge =

Governor of Georgia from 1948 to 1955

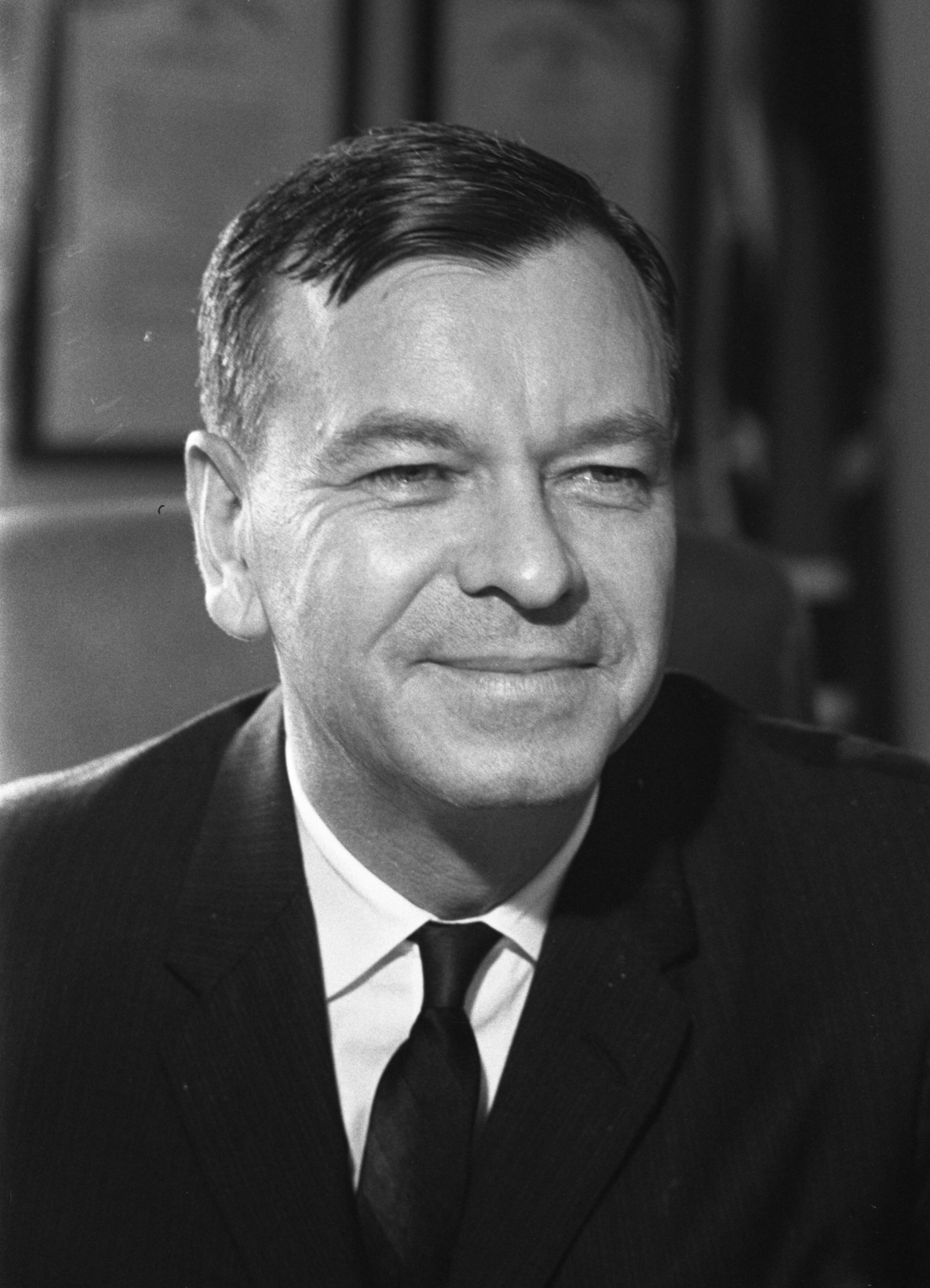
- Talmadge in 1964

Chair of the Senate Agriculture Committee
- In office January 21, 1971 – January 3, 1981
- Preceded by: Allen Ellender
- Succeeded by: Jesse Helms

United States Senator from Georgia
- In office January 3, 1957 – January 3, 1981
- Preceded by: Walter F. George
- Succeeded by: Mack Mattingly

71st Governor of Georgia
- In office November 17, 1948 – January 11, 1955
- Lieutenant: Marvin Griffin
- Preceded by: Melvin E. Thompson
- Succeeded by: Marvin Griffin

Personal details
- Born: Herman Eugene Talmadge; August 9, 1913 McRae, Georgia, U.S.
- Died: March 21, 2002 (aged 88) Hampton, Georgia, U.S.
- Party: Democratic
- Spouses: Katherine Williamson (m. 1937; div. 1940); Betty Shingler (m. 1941; div. 1978); Lynda Cowart Pierce (m. 1984)
- Children: 2
- Relatives: Eugene Talmadge (father)
- Education: University of Georgia (BA, LLB)

Military service
- Allegiance: United States
- Branch/service: United States Navy
- Years of service: 1941–1945
- Rank: Lieutenant Commander
- Battles/wars: World War II

Herman Eugene Talmadge (August 9, 1913 – March 21, 2002) was an American politician who served as governor of Georgia from 1948 to 1955 (following an unsuccessful claim in 1947) and as a U.S. senator from Georgia from 1957 to 1981. A Democrat, Talmadge served during a time of political transition, both in Georgia and nationally. He began his career as a staunch segregationist known for his opposition to civil rights, including supporting legislation that would have closed public schools to prevent desegregation. By the later stages of his career, Talmadge, like many other Southern politicians of the period, had modified his views on race following the enactment of the Voting Rights Act. The act increased African American voter participation and gave substance to the Fifteenth Amendment, enacted nearly a century earlier. His life eventually encapsulated the emergence of his native Georgia from entrenched white supremacy into a multiracial political culture where many white voters regularly elect Black and other non-white candidates to the U.S. Congress and Georgia General Assembly.

When his father, Eugene Talmadge, won the 1946 Georgia gubernatorial election but died before taking office, Herman Talmadge asserted claims to be the 70th governor of Georgia, in what became known as the three governors controversy. In 1947 the General Assembly held a special election to choose between the second- and third-placed candidates in case of his death, and thus prepared by organizing enough write-in votes to ensure his son Herman Talmadge would take part. He lost the election but then produced enough write in votes that he discovered at his house that insured his governorship. He occupied the governor's office from January until March until it was revealed that the write in votes were fraudulent. In fact not only were there names of deceased individuals but their names were also in alphabetical order. Thus the Georgia Supreme Court stripped him of his governorship and decided in favor of Lieutenant Governor-elect Melvin E. Thompson since he was already the acting Lieutenant Governor. The state constitution in effect at the time then required a special election to be held simultaneously with the next state legislative election to fill the remainder of the term. Talmadge defeated Thompson November 2, 1948 by about six percent in that special election to complete the elder Talmadge's unfinished four-year term. He was reelected in 1950, defeating Thompson by a narrower margin. Talmadge served until the end of his term in 1955.

Talmadge, who first became governor at age 33, supported a new statewide sales tax during his second term to fund the construction of new schools and expanded state services. He also supported other infrastructure improvements and increased teachers' salaries. In so doing, the younger governor Talmadge departed from his father's stingy, low-tax and low-spending philosophy while remaining steadfastly opposed to racial desegregation and political equality for Black Americans. He left the governor's office as an incredibly popular executive whose administration earned praise from the traditionally liberal outlets such as the Atlanta Constitution and even Harper's Magazine.

Herman Talmadge was elected to the United States Senate in 1956 when Walter F. George, Georgia's senior senator and the President pro tempore of the United States Senate, declined to seek reelection. In the Senate, Talmadge was a long-serving member of the Senate Agriculture Committee as well as the Senate Finance Committee. During the latter part of his career, he also served as a member of the Select Committee on Presidential Campaign Activities (better known as the Senate Watergate Committee). As chairman of the Senate Agriculture Committee, he oversaw the passage of numerous pieces of important legislation, including the expansion of the Child Nutrition Act and the Consolidated Farm and Rural Development Act of 1972, the first major legislation dealing with rural development since the Rural Electrification Act of 1936. The Senate later denounced Talmadge for financial irregularities that were revealed during a Senate Ethics Committee investigation following a contentious divorce from his second wife. The investigation, as well as Georgia's changing demographics, helped Republican Mack Mattingly defeat Talmadge for re-election in 1980. Following his defeat, Talmadge retired from public life.

== Early life, education and military service ==
Herman Talmadge was born on August 9, 1913, on a farm near the small town of McRae in Telfair County in southeastern Georgia. He was the only son of Eugene Talmadge and his wife, Mattie (Thurmond), and through his mother, he was a second cousin of South Carolina Senator and 1948 Dixiecrat presidential candidate Strom Thurmond. Herman attended public schools in Telfair County until his senior year of high school, when his family moved to Atlanta and he enrolled at Druid Hills High School, graduating in 1931. In the fall of 1931, he entered the University of Georgia for his undergraduate degree and was a member of the Demosthenian Literary Society and Sigma Nu fraternity. After completing his undergraduate studies, Talmadge enrolled in the University of Georgia School of Law. He received his law degree in 1936 and joined his father's law practice.

In 1937, Talmadge married Katherine Williamson. The marriage ended in divorce after three years. In 1941, he married Betty Shingler, and they had two sons, Herman Eugene Jr. and Robert Shingler. When World War II broke out, Talmadge volunteered to serve in the United States Navy. He served as an ensign with the Sixth Naval District at Charleston, and with the Third Naval District in New York after graduating from midshipman's school at Northwestern University. In 1942, Talmadge participated in the invasion of Guadalcanal aboard the USS Tryon. He served as flag secretary to the commandant of naval forces in New Zealand from June 1943 to April 1944 and then as executive officer of the USS Dauphin. Talmadge participated in the battle of Okinawa and was present in Tokyo Bay for the Japanese surrender. He attained the rank of lieutenant commander and was discharged in November 1945.

After his service in World War II, Talmadge returned to his home in Lovejoy, Georgia. While continuing to practice law and to farm, he took over publishing his father's weekly newspaper, The Statesman, and started a ham-curing business.

== Three governors controversy ==
After returning from the war, Talmadge became active in Democratic Party politics. He ran his father's successful 1946 campaign for governor. Eugene Talmadge had been ill, and his supporters were worried about his surviving long enough to be sworn in. They studied the state constitution and believed that if the governor-elect died before his term began, the Georgia General Assembly would choose between the second and third-place finishers. The elder Talmadge ran unopposed among Democrats, so the party officials arranged for write-in votes for Herman Talmadge as insurance.

In December 1946, Eugene Talmadge died before taking office. Melvin E. Thompson, the lieutenant governor-elect; Ellis Arnall, the sitting governor; and Herman Talmadge all arranged to be sworn in and concurrently tried to conduct state business from the Georgia State Capitol. Talmadge soon took control of the governor's office and arranged to have the locks changed. Arnall then relinquished his claim in favor of Thompson. Ultimately, the Supreme Court of Georgia supported Thompson on March 1947.

== Governor of Georgia ==
Talmadge then ran for the special gubernatorial election in 1948, and defeated Thompson. He was elected to a full term in 1950. During his tenure, Talmadge attracted new industries to Georgia. Through the creation of the state's first sales tax, Talmadge funded the construction of over a thousand schools to replace one-room schoolhouses. He also created the state's Highway Board to increase efficiency in infrastructure, resulting in the paving or planning of over 12,000 miles of roads during his time as governor.

He remained a staunch supporter of racial segregation even as the civil rights movement gained momentum. Due to state law restricting consecutive terms, Talmadge was legally unable to seek reelection in 1954. That year, the U.S. Supreme Court ruled in Brown v. Board of Education that segregated public schools were unconstitutional, and advised school systems to integrate.

== United States Senate career ==
As part of Talmadge's 1956 Senate campaign, he published the infamous segregationist pamphlet You and Segregation, arguing that desegregation was a communist plot, that the use of federal power to ban segregation was unconstitutional, and that, in the now-infamous phrase, the United States was a "Republic not a Democracy", since democracy was communist.

Talmadge was elected to the United States Senate in 1956. Most Black people in Georgia were still disenfranchised under state laws passed by white Democrats and discriminatory practices they had conducted since the turn of the 20th century. As a U.S. senator, Talmadge continued to oppose civil rights legislation, even as the civil rights movement gained media coverage and increasing support. After President Lyndon B. Johnson signed the Civil Rights Act of 1964, Talmadge, along with more than a dozen other southern senators, boycotted the 1964 Democratic National Convention.

With the help of Senator Richard Russell, Talmadge had been appointed to the Agriculture Committee during his first year in Washington and to the Senate Finance Committee shortly thereafter. As a junior member of the Agriculture Committee, he worked to address the nation's farmers' changing needs in an evolving global economy. Talmadge also worked to expand support for both farmers and children and families in hunger through his work on the Child Nutrition Act of 1966, but most significantly in 1969 and 1970 as part of the reauthorization and expansion of the 1946 School Lunch Act, which Russell had authored and considered his greatest legislative achievement.

Talmadge was a great admirer of the work Russell did on the 1946 act but recognized that significant improvements were needed. After noting that only a third of American children living in families making less than $2000 a year were able to participate in the program, Talmadge said: "We must use food as a tool of education. A child cannot learn if he is hungry. It has been the experience of school administrators in economically deprived areas that there is a marked improvement in school attendance when children can look forward to the prospect of a good meal at school." Major goals of Talmadge's new proposal were to provide funding for equipment; increase the required level of support from states; allow the "lunch to follow the child", letting students from low-income families that lived in higher-income areas remain eligible for the program; establish the National Advisory Council on Child Nutrition; and give needy children special assistance. The amendments for these purposes became law on May 14, 1970.

When Allen Ellender assumed chairmanship of the Senate Appropriations Committee after Russell's death in January 1971, Talmadge became chairman of the Senate Agriculture Committee, a position he held until leaving office in 1981.

Talmadge's elevation to Agriculture Committee Chairman came at a time when many analysts were forecasting that the world's need for food would soon outstrip its productive capacity. Under Talmadge's leadership, the Senate Agriculture Committee confronted these problems throughout the 1970s. Talmadge oversaw the passage of several bills that more than doubled spending on farm programs by the end of the 1970s. In addition to the Rural Development Act of 1972, the Agriculture and Consumer Protection Act of 1973 (also known as the 1973 U.S. Farm Bill), which provided for commodity price support, soil conservation, and food stamp expansion for four years, passed under his chairmanship. The four-year period established a cycle that ensured the next three farm bills appeared on the congressional agenda after presidential elections, thereby preventing them from becoming entangled in election-year politics. The Food and Agriculture Act of 1977 continued the market-oriented loan and target-pricing policies of its predecessor. Title XIV of the Act confirmed the USDA's historic role in agricultural research under the National Agricultural Research, Extension, and Teaching Policy Act. The bill also made major modifications to food stamps and solidified the program as a part of the Farm Bill.

Also in 1977, as a result of Senate committee reorganization and in recognition of the Agriculture Committee's increased role in addressing hunger and nutrition, growing spending for federally supported child nutrition (which rose from $2.4 billion to more than $8 billion during the decade), and increase of staff size (rising from seven in 1971 to 32 in 1980), the committee's name was changed to the Committee on Agriculture, Nutrition, and Forestry. This was the first change to the committee's name since adding "Forestry" in 1884.

In 1968, Talmadge faced the first of his three Republican challengers for his Senate seat. E. Earl Patton, later a member of the Georgia State Senate, received 256,796 votes (22.5 percent) to Talmadge's 885,103 (77.3 percent). A real estate developer, Patton was the first Georgia Republican to run for the U.S. Senate since the Reconstruction era, when most Republicans were African-American freedmen. He was a sign of the shifting white electorate in the South, as white suburbanites moved into the Republican Party.

Talmadge ran a disciplined office, requiring his staff to respond to every constituent letter within 24 hours of receipt. In 1969, he hired Curtis Lee Atkinson as an administrative aide, making Atkinson the first African-American hired to work on a Southern senator's personal staff since Reconstruction.

In 1973, Talmadge was appointed to the Select Committee on Presidential Campaign Activities (better known as the United States Senate Watergate Committee), which investigated members of the Nixon administration. He served on the committee until its final report was issued in June 1974. Talmadge's service on the committee is generally considered the high-water mark of his time as a U.S. senator.

== Denunciation ==
Late in his Senate career, Talmadge became embroiled in a financial scandal. After an extensive Senate investigation, on October 11, 1979, the Senate voted 81–15 to "denounce" Talmadge for "improper financial conduct" between 1973 and 1978. He was found to have accepted reimbursements of $43,435.83 for official expenses not incurred, and to have improperly reported the "expenses" as campaign expenditures.

After the trial, he faced significant opposition in the state's Democratic primary for the first time in 24 years. Lieutenant Governor Zell Miller challenged Talmadge in the primary with the support of liberals disenchanted with Talmadge's conservatism. Though Talmadge won the primary runoff against Miller, his ethical conduct was a significant issue and he was defeated by the Republican nominee, former state GOP chairman Mack Mattingly. It was believed that the bruising primary battle with Miller left Talmadge weakened for the general election.

== Divorce ==
In 1977, following a long period of personal troubles, including self-admitted alcoholism, which spiraled out of control after his son, Bobby, drowned in 1975, Talmadge filed for divorce from his wife, Betty. The Talmadges reached a divorce settlement in 1978, with Betty receiving $150,000 in cash and 100 acres of their Lovejoy plantation. She was also allowed to use the remaining 1,200 acres on the plantation. Betty testified against Talmadge in 1980 during the Senate investigation into his finances.

== Later life ==
After his defeat, Talmadge retired to his home; his plantation and mansion were now in his ex-wife Betty's possession. In 1984, he married Lynda Pierce. He lived on for more than two decades, dying at 88. Talmadge and Betty, who eventually reconciled and remained on respectful terms, had two sons together, Herman E. Talmadge Jr., and Robert Shingler Talmadge. Betty Talmadge died in 2005, surrounded by family, on her estate. At the time of his death, Herman Talmadge was the earliest serving former governor.

== Awards ==
- 1969, he was awarded an honorary degree in Doctor of Laws from Oglethorpe University.
- 1975, Morris Brown College gave Talmadge its "Man of the Year" award.

== See also ==
- Conservative Democrat
- List of United States senators expelled or censured
- List of members of the American Legion

Political offices
Preceded by Melvin E. Thompson	Governor of Georgia; 1948–1955	Succeeded by Marvin Griffin
Party political offices
Preceded by Eugene Talmadge	Democratic nominee for Governor of Georgia; 1948, 1950	Succeeded by Marvin Griffin
Preceded by Walter F. George	Democratic nominee for U.S. Senator from Georgia (Class 3); 1956, 1962, 1968, 1974, 1980	Succeeded by Wyche Fowler
U.S. Senate
Preceded by Walter F. George	U.S. Senator (Class 3) from Georgia; 1957–1981; Served alongside: Richard B. Russell Jr., David H. Gambrell, Sam Nunn	Succeeded by Mack Mattingly
Preceded by Allen J. Ellender	Chair of the Senate Agriculture Committee; 1971–1981	Succeeded by Jesse Helms
