= Lake Burton Fish Hatchery =

Trout hatchery in Georgia, United States

Coordinates: 34°50′35.97″N 83°35′18.72″W

Lake Burton Fish Hatchery is a fish hatchery operated by the Wildlife Resources Division of the Georgia Department of Natural Resources for the purpose of raising rainbow trout and brown trout being raised for stocking into mountain trout streams in North Georgia, United States. The hatchery located on the shores of Lake Burton in Rabun County, Georgia next to Moccasin Creek and adjacent to Moccasin Creek State Park. It is on Georgia State Route 197 approximately 20 miles north of Clarkesville, Georgia.

The hatchery offers tours during its hours of operation. The short section of Moccasin Creek between the hatchery and Lake Burton is only open to anglers under 12 years of age.
