= Lake Burton (Georgia) =

Man-made lake in Georgia, United States

Coordinates: 34°49′37″N 83°33′18″W

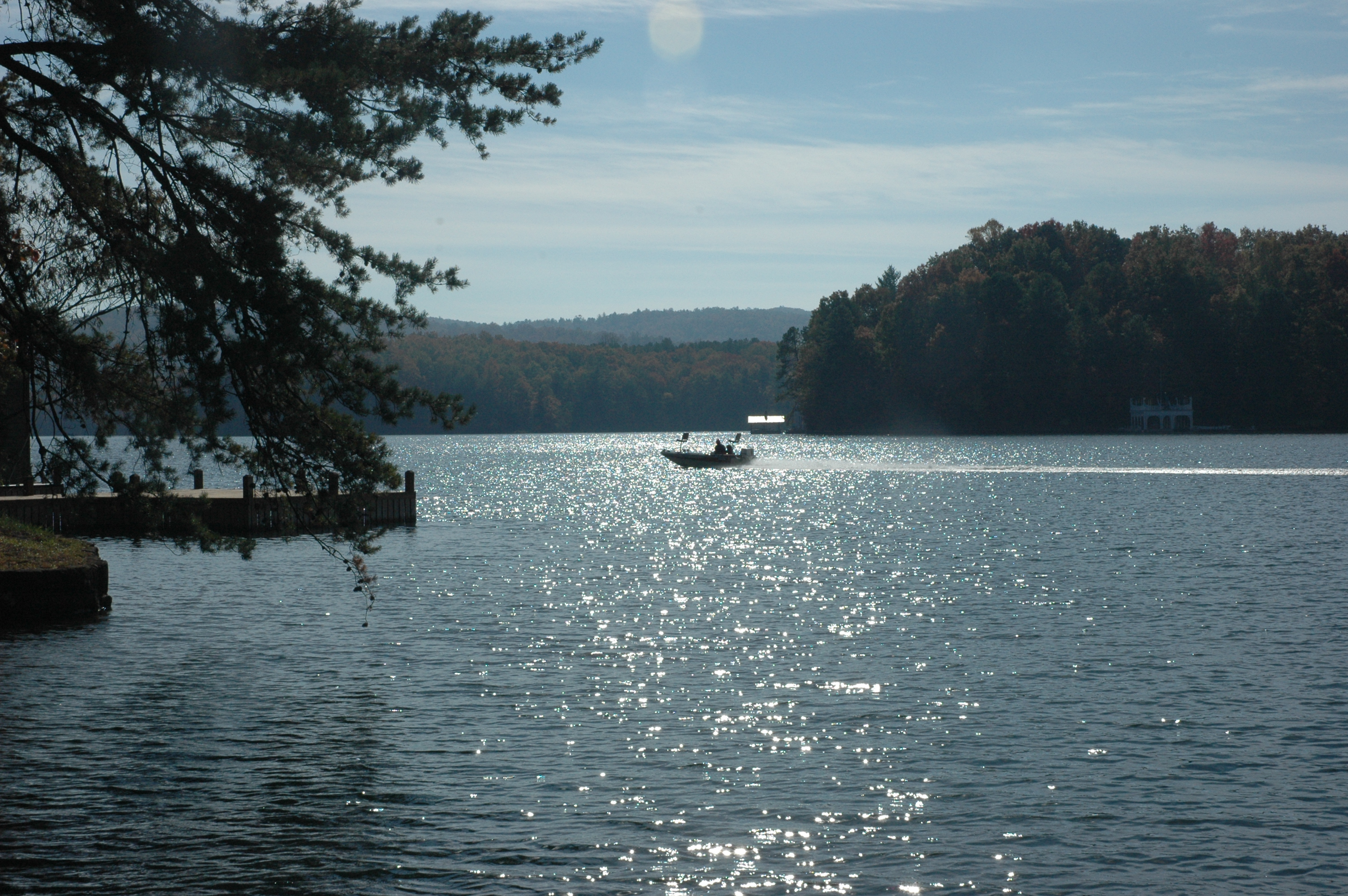

- Location within Georgia Location within the United States
- Location: Rabun County, Georgia
- Type: Reservoir
- Primary inflows: Tallulah River
- Primary outflows: Tallulah River
- Basin countries: United States
- Surface area: 2,775 acres (1,123 ha)
- Max. depth: 120 ft (37 m)
- Surface elevation: 1,865 ft (568 m)

Lake Burton is a 2,775 acres (11.23 km^{2}) reservoir with 62 miles (100 km) of shoreline located in the northeastern corner of Georgia in Rabun County. The lake is owned and administered by the Georgia Power/Southern Company, but it is a public lake. Noted for the remarkable clarity of its water and surrounded by the biodiverse ecosystem of the Blue Ridge Mountains, the lake celebrated its centennial in 2020.

== History and description ==
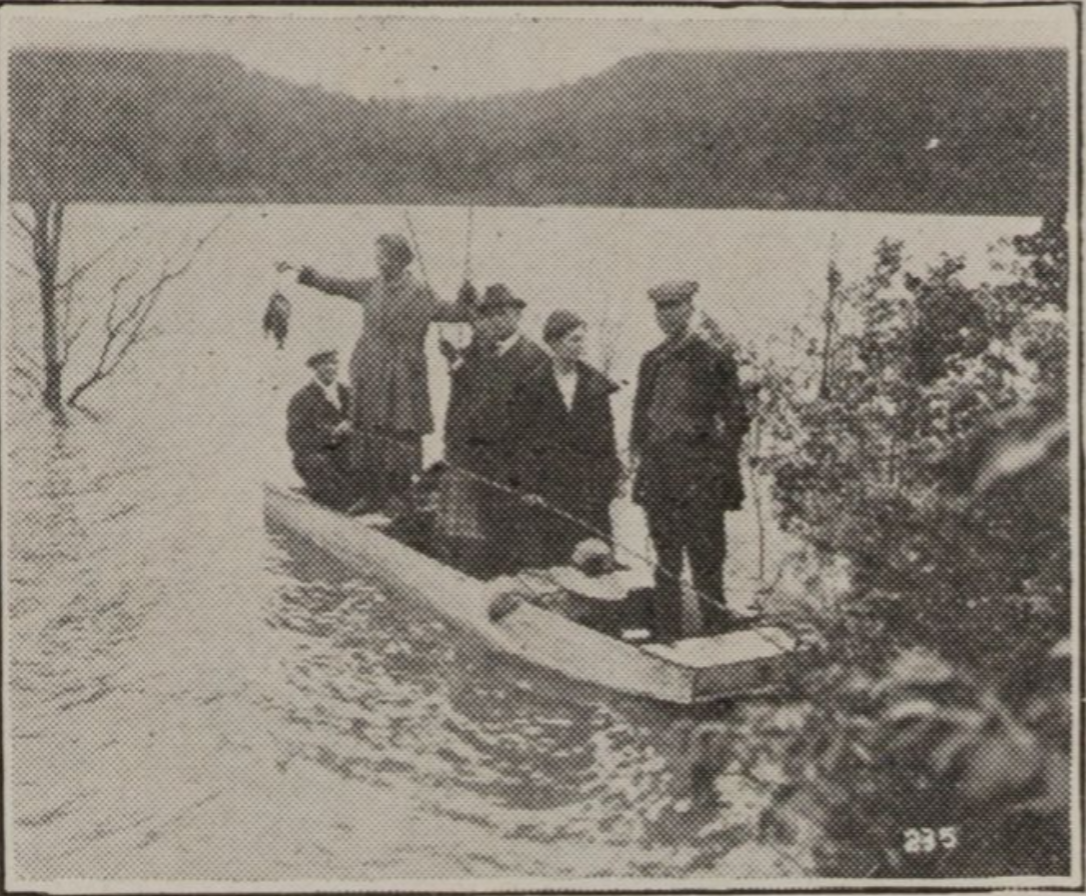
Fishing on Lake Burton C.1924

Lake Burton was constructed in a deep valley located along a 10-mile (16 km) section of the Tallulah River. The dam was completed on December 22, 1919, and declared full August 18, 1920. The dam is a gravity concrete dam, with a height of 128 feet (39 m) and a span of 1,100 feet (340 m). The spillway is equipped with eight gates 22 feet (6.7 m) wide by 6.6 feet (2.0 m) high. The total capacity at an elevation of 1,866.6 feet (568.9 m) with a capacity of 108,000 acre⋅ft (133 GL), of which 106,000 acre⋅ft (131 GL) is usable. The maximal depth is 105 ft (32 m). The generating capacity is 6,120 kilowatts (two units). Lake Burton is the highest Georgia Power lake in Georgia. About 70% of the homeowners lease their land from Georgia Power Company; the remainder is fee-simple, or privately owned.

The Upper Tallulah Valley was inhabited by the Cherokee Indians until the land was ceded to the State of Georgia in 1817. The first land lot for settlement was issued in 1821. The discovery of gold in 1828 on Dick's Creek drew more settlers to the remote valley. Lake Burton's name was derived from the town of Burton, which was the second largest town in Rabun County with a population of approximately 200. The former town now lies below the lake's surface. The town (and the lake) were named after local prominent citizen Jeremiah Burton, the first postmaster, and is situated along the road from Clayton, Georgia, to the Nacoochee Valley. As a young man, Andrew Jackson Richie, founder of Rabun Gap-Nacoochee School, carried the daily mail to Burton by mule.

With the introduction of hydroelectric power to America in the 1880s and due to the fact that the Tallulah River has the greatest verticality of any river in the east, a series of six stairstep dams were constructed in the period 1914–1927 over a distance of 28 mi (45 km). Lake Burton, being the largest and highest of the lakes, was intended to be the primary reservoir for the water needed to power the turbines downstream. This North Georgia Hydro Project was one of the first large, integrated hydroelectric systems to be built in North America. The electricity it provided would begin Atlanta's growth into the economic metropolis it is today.

To construct the dam, the Georgia Railway and Power Company (now the Georgia Power/Southern Company) bought out the 65 families in the town of Burton, and demolished the town. It is said once the dam was closed, the water rose so rapidly that the ruins of the town could not be totally removed. Thus, the steeple of the Baptist Church in the town floated in the lake for three years before it sank. No traces of the town remain other than a handful of cemeteries.

Due to its remote location, and the intervention of The Great Depression and World War II, Lake Burton remained virtually unsettled until the 1970s. Almost surrounded by national forest, much of the lake was not accessible by automobile until the 1960s. It was the destination of fisherman, naturalists, and hikers. The Appalachian Trail, completed in 1937, lies 7 mi (11 km) west of the lake. Gradually, with the growth of Atlanta and the completion of the Interstate Highway System, along with national media attention, the lake became more widely known. The fact that it is a clear water lake, situated between the Atlantic and the Gulf, with an average temperature 8–10 F (4-5 C) degrees cooler than Atlanta, surrounded by National Forest, hardly an hour south of the Smoky Mountains, assured it increasing popularity. Standing Indian Mountain (5,498 feet; 1,676 m), the highest mountain south of the Smokies, lies 15 mi (24 km) due north.

The Lake Burton Fish Hatchery and Moccasin Creek State Park are located on the lake's west side. The lake is home to a diverse variety of fish, including spotted bass, largemouth bass, white bass, black crappie, bluegill, redear sunfish, white catfish, walleye, brown trout, rainbow trout, and yellow perch. Several of its feeder streams are well-known trout streams. Surrounded by the most bio-diverse temperate forest on earth, the natural environment is a unique resource for both visitors and residents.

The residents of Lake Burton are a mix of permanent residents and seasonal vacationers who together make-up the Lake Burton Civic Association, a local organization whose goal is to maintain the lake through volunteer clean-ups and other civic-minded events. First responders and fire protection are provided by the Lakes, Wildcat, and Tallulah/Persimmon Volunteer Fire Departments. Safety on the lake is administered by the Georgia Department of Natural Resources and a local security service, The Mountain Patrol. In 2020, Lake Burton celebrated its centennial. To mark this special occasion, The Lake Burton Civic Association Foundation published the definitive history, Our Southern Eden, A Centennial History of Lake Burton and the Upper Tallulah Valley by Michael E. Maffett MD.

== Events of interest ==
Each summer begins with a wooden boat parade on Memorial Day weekend. Fourth of July fireworks at Lake Burton have been an annual tradition for more than 35 years. The fireworks display was begun in 1976 in honor of the bicentennial by homeowners led by Mason Whitney and continues to be run for over 30 years by a lifelong Lake Burton resident, Hal Rhoad. Though not a Lake Burton Civic Association sponsored event, the July 4th fireworks display is funded by donations from Lake Burton area residents and visitors. The fireworks are launched the Saturday closest to July 4 from Billy Goat Island, an island on the south side of the lake. Most people view the fireworks from boats floating near the island. The light show provided by this Independence Day fleet rivals the fireworks to come. Surrounded by the green Appalachian Mountains, the fireworks echo across the water, adding a remarkable auditory experience to the visual feast of the fireworks. Also on the 4th is the Lake Burton Fun Run, a 2 miles (3 km) race that begins at Moccasin Creek State Park and ends at LaPrades Marina. Its participants are rewarded with a t-shirt designed by a local artist. The Civic Association also organizes an annual tour of homes and a golf tournament.

== YMCA Camp High Harbour ==
The YMCA of Metropolitan Atlanta operates its primary campus of Camp High Harbour near the headwaters of Lake Burton. The camp hosts over 4000 campers each summer. This facility is the site of summer residential camps, leadership programs, and youth retreats.

== 2011 tornado ==
An EF3 tornado struck Lake Burton late on April 27, 2011, damaging the marina at Wildcat Creek and destroying many lake homes. Over 60 homes were destroyed or damaged. One person was killed (Atlanta businessman E. Earl Patton, a former member of the Georgia State Senate) when his lake house was destroyed by the tornado.

== Notes ==
3. Our Southern Eden, A Centennial History of Lake Burton and the Upper Tallulah River Basin by Michael E. Maffett MD, 2020.
