= The Committee of 200 =

The Committee of 200 is an invitation only membership organization of the world's most successful women entrepreneurs and corporate leaders. The Committee of 200's more than 450 members represent over 100 industries in the U.S., Europe, Asia, Canada and Latin America and its members generate more than $200 billion in annual revenues.

== History ==
In 1982, a handful of the most powerful women in business gathered in Los Angeles. Their immediate goal was to raise funds for The National Association of Women Business Owners, a network dedicated to women entrepreneurs. Beyond raising $200,000 for NAWBO, the small group of women ultimately conceived a larger agenda: to create a national network that would capitalize on the experience of women at the top echelons of business.

== Present day ==
The primary mission of C200 is success shared: to foster, celebrate and advance women's leadership in business. C200 members are uniquely connected to each other through the organization by the commonality of their careers. C200 offers current leaders access to unique programming plus a professional and personal network of their peers.

The committee takes part in reach out programs across the United States and in other select areas to MBA and college students as well as high school students. In the past they've visited colleges such as Stanford University, Tel Aviv University, University of California Los Angeles, Duke University, University of Chicago, and London Business School. C200 has also visited with high schools such as The Ann Richards School and The Young Women's Leadership School of East Harlem.

== C200 Foundation ==
In 1987, C200 launched the C200 Foundation to provide women with tools to become successful entrepreneurs and corporate leaders. C200 co-sponsors one-day Reachouts for women MBA students. Seminars rotate among the nation’s top business schools, and at the seminar they award C200 Scholar Awards to enterprising first year women MBAs enrolled at the hosting school.
