= Art Rosenbaum =

American art professor and musician (1938–2022)

- Born: Arthur Spark Rosenbaum; December 6, 1938; Ogdensburg, New York, U.S.
- Died: September 4, 2022 (aged 83); Athens, Georgia, U.S.
- Education: Columbia University
- Occupations: Artist, academic, musician, folklorist
- Spouse: Margo Newmark
- Children: 1

Arthur Spark Rosenbaum (December 6, 1938 – September 4, 2022) was an American art professor at the University of Georgia, an artist, musician, and folklorist. He won a Grammy award in 2008 for Best Historical Album, for his music collection Art Of Field Recording Volume I: Fifty Years Of Traditional American Music Documented By Art Rosenbaum.

== Life and career ==
Rosenbaum was born in Ogdensburg, upstate New York in 1938. His family moved around the United States during his childhood, spending time in Indianapolis and elsewhere, while his father was a member of the Army Medical Corps. He studied at Columbia University, receiving a BA and MFA.

Rosenbaum taught at the University of Georgia from 1976 to 2006. The Georgia Museum of Art later held an exhibition of his drawings and paintings. His other paintings include a mural in the Russell Special Collections Building on the UGA campus, featuring the faces of political figures from Georgia's history. The book Weaving His Art on Golden Looms: Paintings and Drawings by Art Rosenbaum was published on October 1, 2006 by Georgia Museum of Art and William U. Eiland.

Rosenbaum was married to Margo Newmark and had one son. With his wife, he traveled around the United States for over 50 years, recording blues music, fiddle tunes, and other forms of traditional music. Selections of his recordings were published as The Art of Field Recording: 50 Years of Traditional American Music. He also performed as a banjo player.

He died from cancer on September 4, 2022, in Athens, Georgia.

== Bibliography ==
- The Art of the Mountain Banjo (Fant) May 29, 2015 by Art Rosenbaum
- Art Rosenbaum's Old-Time Banjo Book October 2, 2014 by Art Rosenbaum
- Folk Visions and Voices: Traditional November 1, 1983 by Art Rosenbaum
- The Mary Lomax Ballad Book May 2, 2013 by Art Rosenbaum

== Discography ==
Solo

- Five String Banjo (Sonet, 1973) (Kicking Mule, 1974)
- The Art Of The Mountain Banjo (Kicking Mule KM203 and SNKF113, 1975)
- Georgia Banjo Blues (Global Village CD313, 2003)
- The Iron Mountain Baby And Other Railroad Songs, Banjo Songs, And Ballads (Not On Label, 2015)

With Al Murphy

- Art Rosenbaum And Al Murphy (Meadowlands MS-2, 1972)

With Eric Weissberg, Marshall Brickman, The Dillards, and Tom Paley

- Deliverance II (Dueling Banjos) (Elektra 22.016 and 670.4249, 1979 and 1988)

With various artists

- The Young Fogies: banjo, harmonica, and vocals on “Po’ Boy” (Heritage 056, 1985) (Reissued on Rounder 0319, 1994)
- Art of Field Recording Volume I: Fifty Years of Traditional American Music Documented by Art Rosenbaum (Dust-to-Digital DTD-08, 2007)
- Art Of Field Recording Volume II: Fifty Years Of Tradional American Music Documented by Art Rosenbaum (Dust-to-Digital DTD-12, 2008)
