= 1942 United States Senate election in Georgia =

1942 U.S. Senate Democratic primary in Georgia
- September 9, 1942
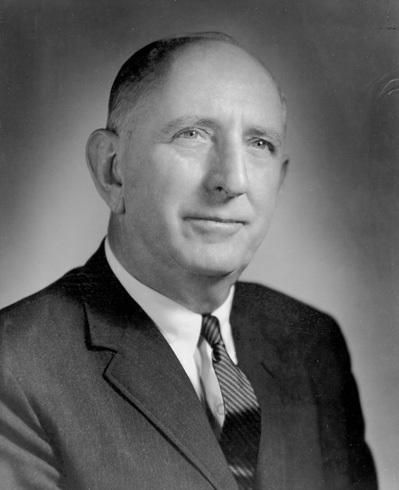

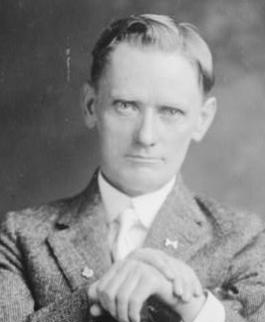
Nominee	Richard Russell Jr.	William D. Upshaw
Party	Democratic	Democratic
Electoral vote	410	0
Popular vote	232,084	55,845
Percentage	80.60%	19.40%
- County results Russell: 60–70% 70–80% 80–90% >90%
U.S. senator before election
Richard Russell Jr.
Democratic
Elected U.S. Senator
Richard Russell Jr.
Democratic

The 1942 United States Senate election in Georgia took place on November 3, 1942. Incumbent Democratic U.S. Senator Richard Russell Jr. was re-elected to a third term (a second full term) in office.

As was common at the time, the Democratic candidate ran with nominal opposition in the general election so therefore the Democratic primary was the real contest, and winning the primary was considered tantamount to election.

== Democratic primary ==
The Democratic primary election was held on September 9, 1942.

=== County unit system ===
From 1917 until 1962, the Democratic Party in the U.S. state of Georgia used a voting system called the county unit system to determine victors in statewide primary elections.

The system was ostensibly designed to function similarly to the Electoral College, but in practice the large ratio of unit votes for small, rural counties to unit votes for more populous urban areas provided outsized political influence to the smaller counties.

Under the county unit system, the 159 counties in Georgia were divided by population into three categories. The largest eight counties were classified as "Urban", the next-largest 30 counties were classified as "Town", and the remaining 121 counties were classified as "Rural". Urban counties were given 6 unit votes, Town counties were given 4 unit votes, and Rural counties were given 2 unit votes, for a total of 410 available unit votes. Each county's unit votes were awarded on a winner-take-all basis.

Candidates were required to obtain a majority of unit votes (not necessarily a majority of the popular vote), or 206 total unit votes, to win the election. If no candidate received a majority in the initial primary, a runoff election was held between the top two candidates to determine a winner.

=== Candidates ===
- Richard Russell Jr., incumbent U.S. Senator
- William D. Upshaw, former U.S. Representative

=== Results ===
Democratic primary
Candidate	Votes	%	CUV
Richard Russell Jr.	232,084	80.60	410
William D. Upshaw	55,845	19.40	0

== General election ==
=== Results ===
1942 U.S. Senate election in Georgia
Party	Candidate	Votes	%	±%
Democratic	Richard Russell Jr. (incumbent)	59,870	96.94%	
Independent	Mrs. LeVert Dwyer Shivers	1,892	3.06%	
Turnout		61,762		
Democratic hold		Swing		

== Bibliography ==
- Guide to US Elections, Fifth Edition, Volume II. CQ Press. 2005. ISBN 978-1-56802-981-8.
- Compiled by Mrs. J. E. Hays, State Historian and Director (1943). Georgia's Official Register, 1939-1943 (PDF). Atlanta, Georgia: State of Georgia, Department of Archives and History.
