= 1936 United States Senate election in Georgia =

1936 U.S. Senate Democratic primary in Georgia
- September 9, 1936
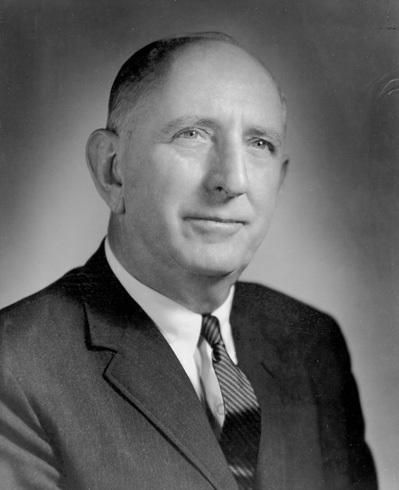

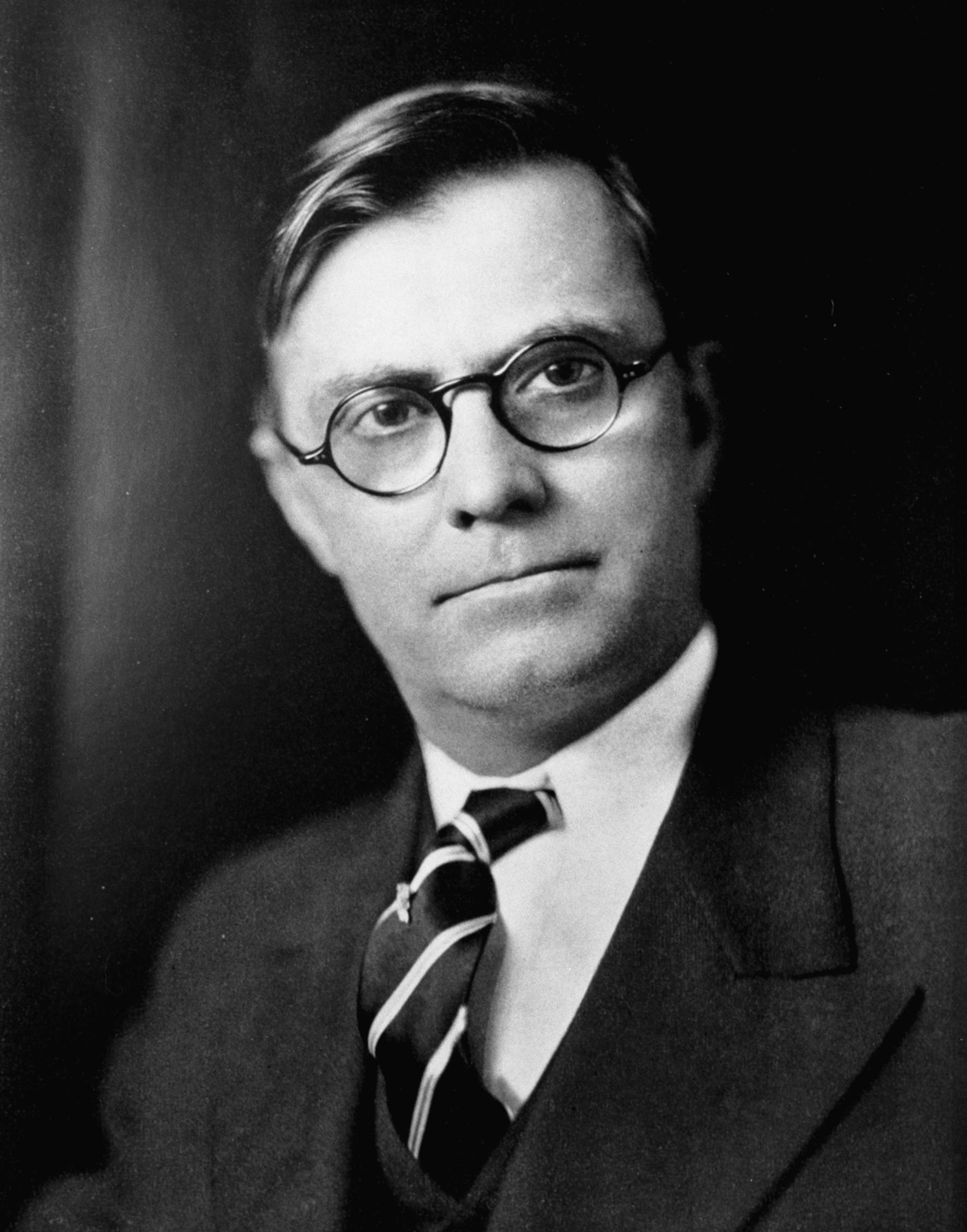
Nominee	Richard Russell Jr.	Eugene Talmadge
Party	Democratic	Democratic
Electoral vote	344	66
Popular vote	165,111	86,203
Percentage	65.54%	34.46%
- County results Russell: 50–60% 60–70% 70–80% 80–90% Talmadge: 50–60% 60–70% 70–80%
U.S. senator before election
Richard Russell Jr.
Democratic
Elected U.S. Senator
Richard Russell Jr.
Democratic

The 1936 United States Senate election in Georgia took place on November 3, 1936. Incumbent Democratic U.S. Senator Richard Russell Jr. was re-elected to a second term (his first full term) in office after first being elected in the 1932 United States Senate special election in Georgia.

As was common at the time, the Democratic candidate ran with no opposition in the general election so therefore the Democratic primary was the real contest, and winning the primary was considered tantamount to election.

== Democratic primary ==
The Democratic primary election was held on September 9, 1936. The incumbent Senator of Georgia Richard Russell Jr. had become a noted supporter of the New Deal as a Senator, while Governor Eugene Talmadge was a strong opponent of the program. After being prevented by term limits to run again for Governor, Talmadge opted to challenge Russell as an opponent of the New Deal, which by then had grown to be widely popular among Georgians.

=== County unit system ===
From 1917 until 1962, the Democratic Party in the U.S. state of Georgia used a voting system called the county unit system to determine victors in statewide primary elections.

The system was ostensibly designed to function similarly to the Electoral College, but in practice the large ratio of unit votes for small, rural counties to unit votes for more populous urban areas provided outsized political influence to the smaller counties.

Under the county unit system, the 159 counties in Georgia were divided by population into three categories. The largest eight counties were classified as "Urban", the next-largest 30 counties were classified as "Town", and the remaining 121 counties were classified as "Rural". Urban counties were given 6 unit votes, Town counties were given 4 unit votes, and Rural counties were given 2 unit votes, for a total of 410 available unit votes. Each county's unit votes were awarded on a winner-take-all basis.

Candidates were required to obtain a majority of unit votes (not necessarily a majority of the popular vote), or 206 total unit votes, to win the election. If no candidate received a majority in the initial primary, a runoff election was held between the top two candidates to determine a winner.

=== Candidates ===
- Richard Russell Jr., incumbent U.S. Senator
- Eugene Talmadge, Governor of Georgia

=== Results ===
Democratic primary
Candidate	Votes	%	CUV
Richard Russell Jr.	165,111	65.54	344
Eugene Talmadge	86,203	34.46	66

== General election ==
=== Results ===
1936 United States Senate election in Georgia
Party	Candidate	Votes	%
Democratic	Richard Russell Jr. (Incumbent)	285,468	100.00%
Democratic hold			
