= John S. Cohen =

American politician (1870–1935)

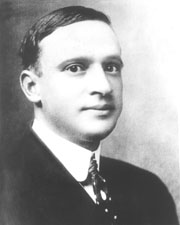

United States Senator from Georgia
- In office April 25, 1932 – January 11, 1933
- Appointed by: Richard Russell Jr.
- Preceded by: William J. Harris
- Succeeded by: Richard Russell Jr.

Personal details
- Born: John Sanford Cohen; February 26, 1870 Augusta, Georgia, U.S.
- Died: May 13, 1935 (aged 65) Atlanta, Georgia, U.S.
- Party: Democratic

John Sanford Cohen (February 26, 1870 – May 13, 1935) was a United States senator from Georgia.

== Life and career ==
Cohen was born in Augusta, Georgia, the son of Ellen Gobert (Wright) and Philip Lawrence Cohen. His father was from a long-established Jewish family. Cohen was raised in his mother's Episcopalian faith. His maternal grandfather was politician and Confederate Civil War general Ambrose R. Wright.

Cohen was educated at Richmond Academy in Augusta and Shenandoah Valley Academy at Winchester, Virginia. He attended the United States Naval Academy in 1885 and 1886, and became a newspaper reporter for the New York World in 1886. He was secretary to Secretary of the Interior Hoke Smith from 1893 to 1896, and was a member of the press galleries of the United States Congress from 1893 to 1897. During the Spanish–American War, he served as a war correspondent for the Atlanta Journal, and subsequently enlisted and served in the Third Georgia Volunteer Infantry, attaining the rank of major. He was a member of the army of occupation in Cuba, and was president of the Atlanta Journal, which he edited from 1900 to 1935. He originated the plan for the national highway from New York City to Jacksonville, Florida, and was vice chairman of the Democratic National Committee from 1932 to 1935.

Cohen was appointed on April 25, 1932 to the United States Senate as a Democrat to fill the vacancy caused by the death of William J. Harris and served from April 25, 1932 to January 11, 1933, when a successor was duly elected and qualified. He was not a candidate in 1932 to fill the vacancy, and continued his former business activities until his death in Atlanta. He was buried at Westview Cemetery, in Atlanta.

In 1942 Cohen was inducted into the Georgia Newspaper Hall of Fame.

U.S. Senate
Preceded by William J. Harris	U.S. senator (Class 2) from Georgia; April 25, 1932 – January 11, 1933; Served alongside: Walter F. George	Succeeded by Richard Russell, Jr.
