= Richard B. Russell Special Collections Building =

University of Georgia library building

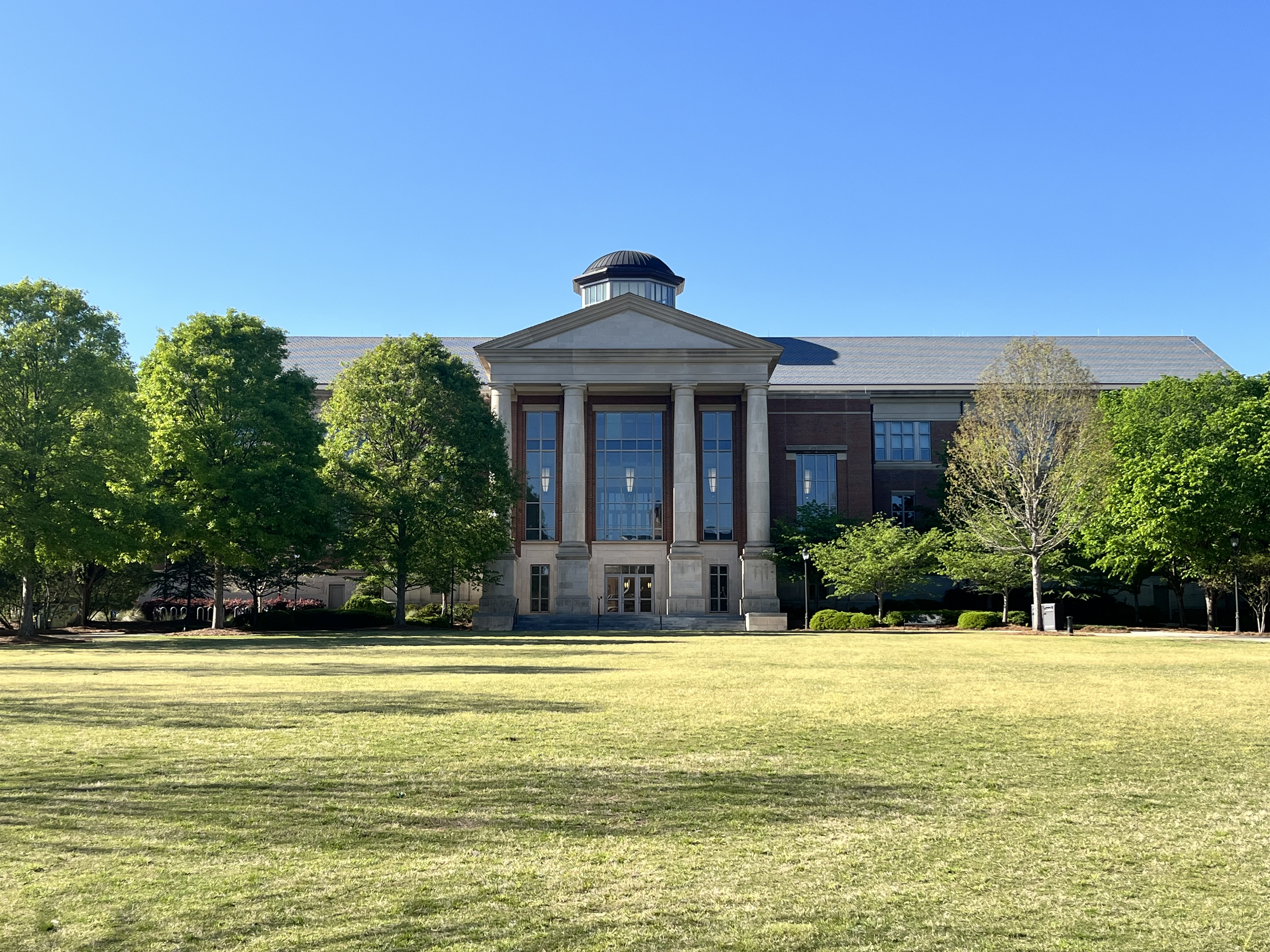
- 33.95424886688814°N 83.3775007987839°W
- Location: Athens, Georgia, United States
- Type: Academic library

Other information
- Affiliation: University of Georgia
- Website: www.libs.uga.edu/russell-library

The Richard B. Russell Special Collections Building at the University of Georgia holds the Hargrett Rare Book and Manuscript Library, the Russell Library for Political Research and Studies, the Walter J. Brown Media Archives, and the Peabody Collection. The building is named for Richard B. Russell.

The $46 million building was dedicated in February 2012. It includes galleries, oral interviews, videos, and informational kiosks. Tours of the building are offered. A mural by art professor emeritus Art Rosenbaum depicts some of the faces of prominent political figures from Georgia's history.
