= 1966 United States Senate election in Georgia =

1966 Democratic Senate primary election in Georgia
- September 14, 1966
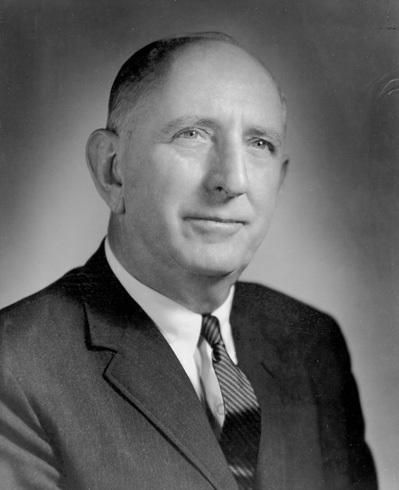

Nominee	Richard Russell Jr.	Harry Hyde
Party	Democratic	Democratic
Popular vote	596,209	61,922
Percentage	90.59%	9.41%
- County results Russell: 60–70% 70–80% 80–90% >90%
U.S. senator before election
Richard Russell Jr.
Democratic
Elected U.S. Senator
Richard Russell Jr.
Democratic

The 1966 United States Senate election in Georgia was held on November 8, 1966. Incumbent Democratic Senator Richard Russell Jr. was elected to a seventh term in office.

On September 14, Russell won the Democratic primary with 90.59% of the vote against only nominal opposition from fellow Democrat Harry Hyde. At this time, Georgia was a one-party state and the Democratic nomination was tantamount to victory. No Republican had run for Senate in Georgia since 1932. Russell won the November general election without an opponent.

Russell did not complete his term; he died in January 1971.

== Democratic primary ==
=== Candidates ===
- Harry Hyde, resident of Marietta
- Richard Russell Jr., incumbent United States Senator

=== Results ===
1966 Senate Democratic primary
Party	Candidate	Votes	%
Democratic	Richard Russell Jr. (incumbent)	596,209	90.59%
Democratic	Harry Hyde	61,922	9.41%
Total votes		666,910	100.00

== General election ==
1966 United States Senate election
Party	Candidate	Votes	%	±%
Democratic	Richard Russell Jr. (incumbent)	631,002	99.95%	▲0.01
Write-in		328	0.05%	▼0.01
Total votes		631,330	100.00%	
