= List of United States senators from Georgia =

Current delegation

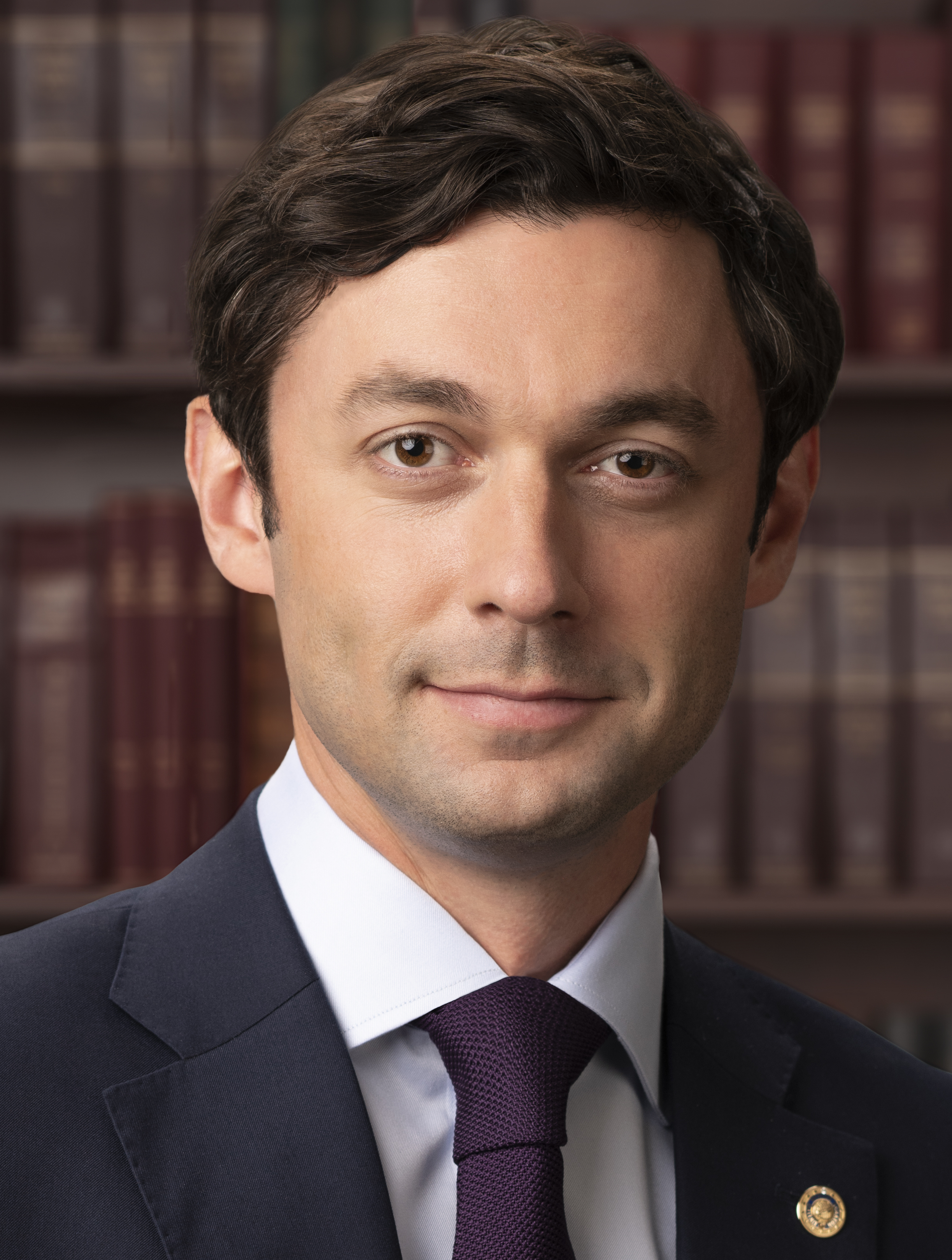
Jon Ossoff (D)

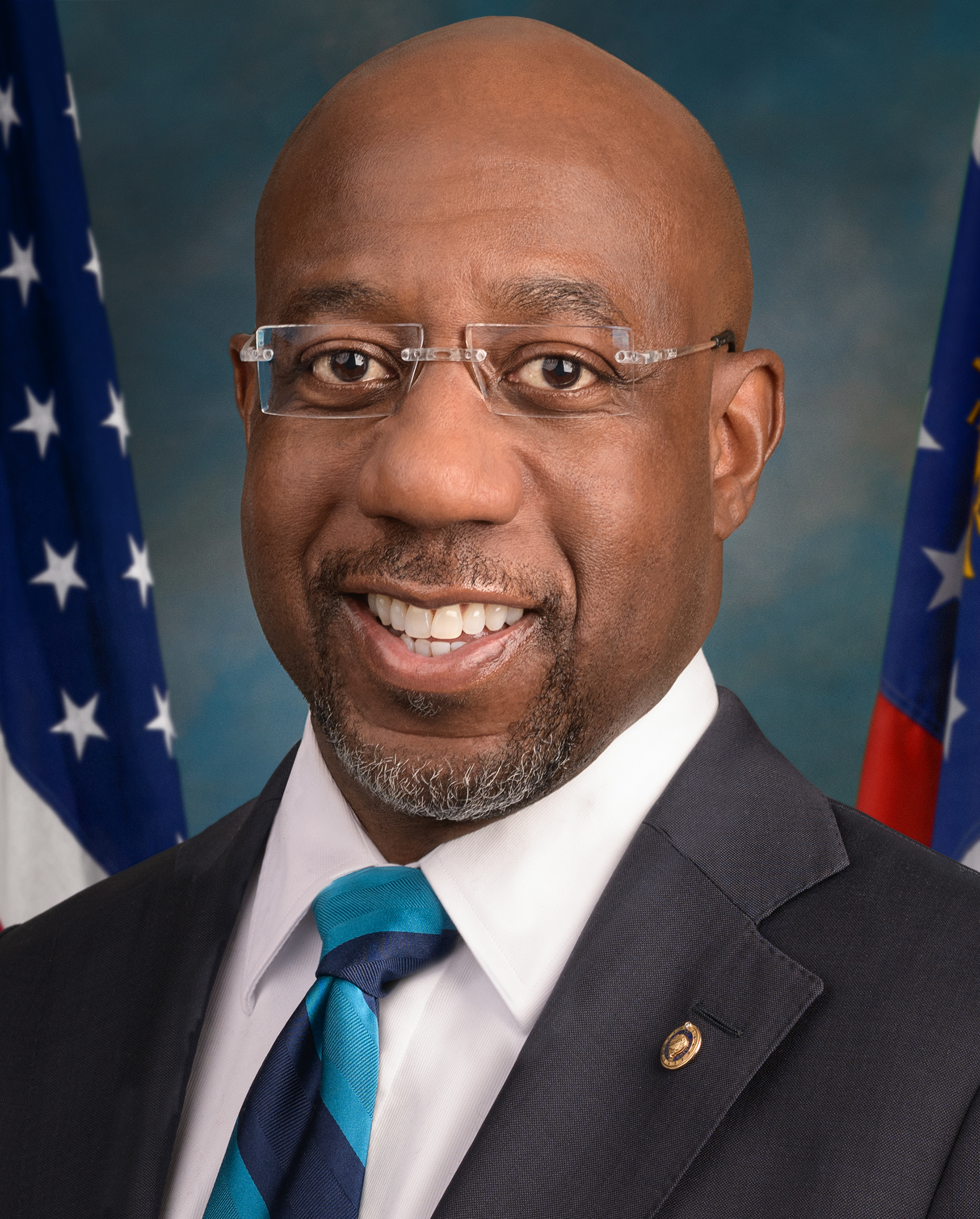
Raphael Warnock (D)

(ordered by seniority)

Georgia was admitted to the Union on January 2, 1788. The state has had senators since the 1st Congress. Its Senate seats were declared vacant in March 1861 owing to its secession from the Union. They were again filled from February 1871.

United States senators are popularly elected to six-year terms that begin on January 3 of the year after their election. Elections are held the first Tuesday after November 1. Before 1914, Georgia's senators were chosen by the Georgia General Assembly, and before 1935, their terms began March 4. Popular Senate elections remained despite the General Assembly not taking action to ratify the Seventeenth Amendment to the United States Constitution that was passed in 1913.

Rebecca Latimer Felton was the first female U.S. senator, representing Georgia in the Senate for one day in 1922, having been appointed to the seat to replace Thomas E. Watson after his death in September 1922.

Richard Russell Jr. was the state's longest serving senator, served from 1933 to 1971.

Since January 20, 2021, Georgia has been represented in the Senate by Democrats Jon Ossoff and Raphael Warnock. Ossoff defeated Republican David Perdue in the regularly-scheduled 2020 election, while Warnock defeated appointed Republican incumbent Kelly Loeffler in the concurrent special election, both of which were decided in runoffs on January 5, 2021. Ossoff is the first Jewish senator from Georgia and Warnock the first black senator from Georgia. Although both Ossoff and Warnock were sworn into office on the same date, Ossoff is officially Georgia's senior senator because his last name comes first alphabetically and he was elected to a full six-year term first.

== List of senators ==
| Class 2 Class 2 senators belong to the electoral cycle that most recently had regular elections in 2008, 2014, 2020, and 2026. The next election will be in 2032. | | | | | | C | Class 3 Class 3 senators belong to the electoral cycle that most recently had regular elections in 2004, 2010, 2016, and 2022. The next election will be in 2028. | | | | | |
| # | Senator | Party | Dates in office | Electoral history | T | C | T | Electoral history | Dates in office | Party | Senator | # |
|---|---|---|---|---|---|---|---|---|---|---|---|---|
| 1 | William Few (Augusta) | Anti- Admin. | Mar 4, 1789 – Mar 3, 1793 | Elected in 1789. Lost re-election. | 1 | 1st | 1 | Elected in 1789. | Mar 4, 1789 – Mar 3, 1801 | Anti- Admin. | James Gunn (Louisville) | 1 |
| 1 | William Few (Augusta) | Anti- Admin. | Mar 4, 1789 – Mar 3, 1793 | Elected in 1789. Lost re-election. | 1 | 2nd | 1 | Elected in 1789. | Mar 4, 1789 – Mar 3, 1801 | Anti- Admin. | James Gunn (Louisville) | 1 |
| 2 | James Jackson (Savannah) | Anti- Admin. | Mar 4, 1793 – Nov 16, 1795 | Elected in 1793. Resigned to run for the Georgia legislature. | 2 | 3rd | 1 | Elected in 1789. | Mar 4, 1789 – Mar 3, 1801 | Anti- Admin. | James Gunn (Louisville) | 1 |
| 2 | James Jackson (Savannah) | Democratic- Republican | Mar 4, 1793 – Nov 16, 1795 | Elected in 1793. Resigned to run for the Georgia legislature. | 2 | 4th | 2 | Re-elected in 1794. Retired. | Mar 4, 1789 – Mar 3, 1801 | Federalist | James Gunn (Louisville) | 1 |
| 3 | George Walton (Savannah) | Federalist | Nov 16, 1795 – Feb 20, 1796 | Appointed to continue Jackson's term. Retired when successor elected. | 2 | 4th | 2 | Re-elected in 1794. Retired. | Mar 4, 1789 – Mar 3, 1801 | Federalist | James Gunn (Louisville) | 1 |
| 4 | Josiah Tattnall (Savannah) | Democratic- Republican | Feb 20, 1796 – Mar 3, 1799 | Elected to finish Jackson's term. | 2 | 4th | 2 | Re-elected in 1794. Retired. | Mar 4, 1789 – Mar 3, 1801 | Federalist | James Gunn (Louisville) | 1 |
| 4 | Josiah Tattnall (Savannah) | Democratic- Republican | Feb 20, 1796 – Mar 3, 1799 | Elected to finish Jackson's term. | 2 | 5th | 2 | Re-elected in 1794. Retired. | Mar 4, 1789 – Mar 3, 1801 | Federalist | James Gunn (Louisville) | 1 |
| 5 | Abraham Baldwin (Baldwin County) | Democratic- Republican | Mar 4, 1799 – Mar 4, 1807 | Elected in 1799. | 3 | 6th | 2 | Re-elected in 1794. Retired. | Mar 4, 1789 – Mar 3, 1801 | Federalist | James Gunn (Louisville) | 1 |
| 5 | Abraham Baldwin (Baldwin County) | Democratic- Republican | Mar 4, 1799 – Mar 4, 1807 | Elected in 1799. | 3 | 7th | 3 | Elected in 1800. Died. | Mar 4, 1801 – Mar 19, 1806 | Democratic- Republican | James Jackson (Savannah) | 2 |
| 5 | Abraham Baldwin (Baldwin County) | Democratic- Republican | Mar 4, 1799 – Mar 4, 1807 | Elected in 1799. | 3 | 8th | 3 | Elected in 1800. Died. | Mar 4, 1801 – Mar 19, 1806 | Democratic- Republican | James Jackson (Savannah) | 2 |
| 5 | Abraham Baldwin (Baldwin County) | Democratic- Republican | Mar 4, 1799 – Mar 4, 1807 | Re-elected in 1804. Died. | 4 | 9th | 3 | Elected in 1800. Died. | Mar 4, 1801 – Mar 19, 1806 | Democratic- Republican | James Jackson (Savannah) | 2 |
| 5 | Abraham Baldwin (Baldwin County) | Democratic- Republican | Mar 4, 1799 – Mar 4, 1807 | Re-elected in 1804. Died. | 4 | 9th | 3 | | Mar 19, 1806 – Jun 19, 1806 | Vacant | | |
| 5 | Abraham Baldwin (Baldwin County) | Democratic- Republican | Mar 4, 1799 – Mar 4, 1807 | Re-elected in 1804. Died. | 4 | 9th | 3 | Elected to finish Jackson's term. | Jun 19, 1806 – Nov 14, 1809 | Democratic- Republican | John Milledge (Augusta) | 3 |
| Vacant | | | Mar 4, 1807 – Aug 27, 1807 | | 4 | 10th | 4 | Re-elected in 1806. Resigned. | Jun 19, 1806 – Nov 14, 1809 | Democratic- Republican | John Milledge (Augusta) | 3 |
| 6 | George Jones (Savannah) | Democratic- Republican | Aug 27, 1807 – Nov 7, 1807 | Appointed to continue Baldwin's term. Lost special election. | 4 | 10th | 4 | Re-elected in 1806. Resigned. | Jun 19, 1806 – Nov 14, 1809 | Democratic- Republican | John Milledge (Augusta) | 3 |
| 7 | William H. Crawford (Lexington) | Democratic- Republican | Nov 7, 1807 – Mar 23, 1813 | Elected to finish Baldwin's term. | 4 | 10th | 4 | Re-elected in 1806. Resigned. | Jun 19, 1806 – Nov 14, 1809 | Democratic- Republican | John Milledge (Augusta) | 3 |
| 7 | William H. Crawford (Lexington) | Democratic- Republican | Nov 7, 1807 – Mar 23, 1813 | Elected to finish Baldwin's term. | 4 | 11th | 4 | Re-elected in 1806. Resigned. | Jun 19, 1806 – Nov 14, 1809 | Democratic- Republican | John Milledge (Augusta) | 3 |
| 7 | William H. Crawford (Lexington) | Democratic- Republican | Nov 7, 1807 – Mar 23, 1813 | Elected to finish Baldwin's term. | 4 | 11th | 4 | | Nov 14, 1809 – Nov 27, 1809 | Vacant | | |
| 7 | William H. Crawford (Lexington) | Democratic- Republican | Nov 7, 1807 – Mar 23, 1813 | Elected to finish Baldwin's term. | 4 | 11th | 4 | Elected to finish Milledge's term. | Nov 27, 1809 – Mar 3, 1819 | Democratic- Republican | Charles Tait (Elbert) | 4 |
| 7 | William H. Crawford (Lexington) | Democratic- Republican | Nov 7, 1807 – Mar 23, 1813 | Re-elected in 1810 or 1811 Resigned to become U.S. Minister to France. | 5 | 12th | 4 | Elected to finish Milledge's term. | Nov 27, 1809 – Mar 3, 1819 | Democratic- Republican | Charles Tait (Elbert) | 4 |
| 7 | William H. Crawford (Lexington) | Democratic- Republican | Nov 7, 1807 – Mar 23, 1813 | Re-elected in 1810 or 1811 Resigned to become U.S. Minister to France. | 5 | 13th | 5 | Re-elected in 1813. | Nov 27, 1809 – Mar 3, 1819 | Democratic- Republican | Charles Tait (Elbert) | 4 |
| Vacant | | | Mar 23, 1813 – Apr 8, 1813 | | 5 | 13th | 5 | Re-elected in 1813. | Nov 27, 1809 – Mar 3, 1819 | Democratic- Republican | Charles Tait (Elbert) | 4 |
| 8 | William Bellinger Bulloch (Savannah) | Democratic- Republican | Apr 8, 1813 – Nov 6, 1813 | Appointed to continue Crawford's term. Retired when successor elected. | 5 | 13th | 5 | Re-elected in 1813. | Nov 27, 1809 – Mar 3, 1819 | Democratic- Republican | Charles Tait (Elbert) | 4 |
| 9 | William Wyatt Bibb (Petersburg) | Democratic- Republican | Nov 6, 1813 – Nov 9, 1816 | Elected to finish Crawford's term. Resigned. | 5 | 13th | 5 | Re-elected in 1813. | Nov 27, 1809 – Mar 3, 1819 | Democratic- Republican | Charles Tait (Elbert) | 4 |
| 9 | William Wyatt Bibb (Petersburg) | Democratic- Republican | Nov 6, 1813 – Nov 9, 1816 | Elected to finish Crawford's term. Resigned. | 5 | 14th | 5 | Re-elected in 1813. | Nov 27, 1809 – Mar 3, 1819 | Democratic- Republican | Charles Tait (Elbert) | 4 |
| Vacant | | | Nov 9, 1816 – Nov 13, 1816 | | 5 | 14th | 5 | Re-elected in 1813. | Nov 27, 1809 – Mar 3, 1819 | Democratic- Republican | Charles Tait (Elbert) | 4 |
| 10 | George Troup (Dublin) | Democratic- Republican | Nov 13, 1816 – Sep 23, 1818 | Elected to finish Crawford's term. | 5 | 14th | 5 | Re-elected in 1813. | Nov 27, 1809 – Mar 3, 1819 | Democratic- Republican | Charles Tait (Elbert) | 4 |
| 10 | George Troup (Dublin) | Democratic- Republican | Nov 13, 1816 – Sep 23, 1818 | Elected to full term in 1816. Resigned. | 6 | 15th | 5 | Re-elected in 1813. | Nov 27, 1809 – Mar 3, 1819 | Democratic- Republican | Charles Tait (Elbert) | 4 |
| Vacant | | | Sep 23, 1818 – Nov 23, 1818 | | 6 | 15th | 5 | Re-elected in 1813. | Nov 27, 1809 – Mar 3, 1819 | Democratic- Republican | Charles Tait (Elbert) | 4 |
| 11 | John Forsyth (Augusta) | Democratic- Republican | Nov 23, 1818 – Feb 17, 1819 | Elected to finish Troup's term. Resigned to become U.S. Minister to Spain. | 6 | 15th | 5 | Re-elected in 1813. | Nov 27, 1809 – Mar 3, 1819 | Democratic- Republican | Charles Tait (Elbert) | 4 |
| Vacant | | | Feb 17, 1819 – Nov 6, 1819 | | 6 | 15th | 5 | Re-elected in 1813. | Nov 27, 1809 – Mar 3, 1819 | Democratic- Republican | Charles Tait (Elbert) | 4 |
| Vacant | | | Feb 17, 1819 – Nov 6, 1819 | | 6 | 16th | 6 | Elected in 1819. | Mar 4, 1819 – Mar 3, 1825 | Democratic- Republican | John Elliott (Sunbury) | 5 |
| 12 | Freeman Walker (Augusta) | Democratic- Republican | Nov 6, 1819 – Aug 6, 1821 | Elected to finish Troup's term. Resigned. | 6 | 16th | 6 | Elected in 1819. | Mar 4, 1819 – Mar 3, 1825 | Democratic- Republican | John Elliott (Sunbury) | 5 |
| 12 | Freeman Walker (Augusta) | Democratic- Republican | Nov 6, 1819 – Aug 6, 1821 | Elected to finish Troup's term. Resigned. | 6 | 17th | 6 | Elected in 1819. | Mar 4, 1819 – Mar 3, 1825 | Democratic- Republican | John Elliott (Sunbury) | 5 |
| Vacant | | | Aug 6, 1821 – Nov 10, 1821 | | 6 | 17th | 6 | Elected in 1819. | Mar 4, 1819 – Mar 3, 1825 | Democratic- Republican | John Elliott (Sunbury) | 5 |
| 13 | Nicholas Ware (Augusta) | Democratic- Republican | Nov 10, 1821 – Sep 7, 1824 | Elected to finish Troup's term. | 6 | 17th | 6 | Elected in 1819. | Mar 4, 1819 – Mar 3, 1825 | Democratic- Republican | John Elliott (Sunbury) | 5 |
| 13 | Nicholas Ware (Augusta) | Democratic- Republican | Nov 10, 1821 – Sep 7, 1824 | Re-elected in 1823. Died. | 7 | 18th | 6 | Elected in 1819. | Mar 4, 1819 – Mar 3, 1825 | Democratic- Republican | John Elliott (Sunbury) | 5 |
| Vacant | | | Sep 7, 1824 – Dec 6, 1824 | | 7 | 18th | 6 | Elected in 1819. | Mar 4, 1819 – Mar 3, 1825 | Democratic- Republican | John Elliott (Sunbury) | 5 |
| 14 | Thomas W. Cobb (Greensboro) | Democratic- Republican | Dec 6, 1824 – Nov 7, 1828 | Elected to finish Ware's term. Resigned. | 7 | 18th | 6 | Elected in 1819. | Mar 4, 1819 – Mar 3, 1825 | Democratic- Republican | John Elliott (Sunbury) | 5 |
| 14 | Thomas W. Cobb (Greensboro) | Jacksonian | Dec 6, 1824 – Nov 7, 1828 | Elected to finish Ware's term. Resigned. | 7 | 19th | 7 | Elected in 1825. Resigned to become U.S. Attorney General. | Mar 4, 1825 – Mar 9, 1829 | Jacksonian | John M. Berrien (Savannah) | 6 |
| 14 | Thomas W. Cobb (Greensboro) | Jacksonian | Dec 6, 1824 – Nov 7, 1828 | Elected to finish Ware's term. Resigned. | 7 | 20th | 7 | Elected in 1825. Resigned to become U.S. Attorney General. | Mar 4, 1825 – Mar 9, 1829 | Jacksonian | John M. Berrien (Savannah) | 6 |
| 15 | Oliver H. Prince (Macon) | Jacksonian | Nov 7, 1828 – Mar 3, 1829 | Elected to finish Ware's term. [data missing] | 7 | 20th | 7 | Elected in 1825. Resigned to become U.S. Attorney General. | Mar 4, 1825 – Mar 9, 1829 | Jacksonian | John M. Berrien (Savannah) | 6 |
| 16 | George Troup (Dublin) | Jacksonian | Mar 4, 1829 – Nov 8, 1833 | Elected in 1828. Resigned. | 8 | 21st | 7 | Elected in 1825. Resigned to become U.S. Attorney General. | Mar 4, 1825 – Mar 9, 1829 | Jacksonian | John M. Berrien (Savannah) | 6 |
| 16 | George Troup (Dublin) | Jacksonian | Mar 4, 1829 – Nov 8, 1833 | Elected in 1828. Resigned. | 8 | 21st | 7 | | Mar 9, 1829 – Nov 9, 1829 | Vacant | | |
| 16 | George Troup (Dublin) | Jacksonian | Mar 4, 1829 – Nov 8, 1833 | Elected in 1828. Resigned. | 8 | 21st | 7 | Elected to finish Berrien's term. | Nov 9, 1829 – Jun 27, 1834 | Jacksonian | John Forsyth (Columbus) | 7 |
| 16 | George Troup (Dublin) | Jacksonian | Mar 4, 1829 – Nov 8, 1833 | Elected in 1828. Resigned. | 8 | 22nd | 8 | Re-elected in 1830 or 1831. Resigned to become U.S. Secretary of State. | Nov 9, 1829 – Jun 27, 1834 | Jacksonian | John Forsyth (Columbus) | 7 |
| 16 | George Troup (Dublin) | Jacksonian | Mar 4, 1829 – Nov 8, 1833 | Elected in 1828. Resigned. | 8 | 23rd | 8 | Re-elected in 1830 or 1831. Resigned to become U.S. Secretary of State. | Nov 9, 1829 – Jun 27, 1834 | Jacksonian | John Forsyth (Columbus) | 7 |
| Vacant | | | Nov 8, 1833 – Nov 21, 1833 | | 8 | 23rd | 8 | Re-elected in 1830 or 1831. Resigned to become U.S. Secretary of State. | Nov 9, 1829 – Jun 27, 1834 | Jacksonian | John Forsyth (Columbus) | 7 |
| 17 | John P. King (Augusta) | Jacksonian | Nov 21, 1833 – Nov 1, 1837 | Elected to finish Troup's term. | 8 | 23rd | 8 | Re-elected in 1830 or 1831. Resigned to become U.S. Secretary of State. | Nov 9, 1829 – Jun 27, 1834 | Jacksonian | John Forsyth (Columbus) | 7 |
| 17 | John P. King (Augusta) | Jacksonian | Nov 21, 1833 – Nov 1, 1837 | Elected to finish Troup's term. | 8 | 23rd | 8 | | Jun 27, 1834 – Jan 12, 1835 | Vacant | | |
| 17 | John P. King (Augusta) | Jacksonian | Nov 21, 1833 – Nov 1, 1837 | Elected to finish Troup's term. | 8 | 23rd | 8 | Elected to finish Forsyth's term. | Jan 12, 1835 – Mar 3, 1843 | Jacksonian | Alfred Cuthbert (Monticello) | 8 |
| 17 | John P. King (Augusta) | Jacksonian | Nov 21, 1833 – Nov 1, 1837 | Re-elected in 1834. Resigned. | 9 | 24th | 8 | Elected to finish Forsyth's term. | Jan 12, 1835 – Mar 3, 1843 | Jacksonian | Alfred Cuthbert (Monticello) | 8 |
| 17 | John P. King (Augusta) | Democratic | Nov 21, 1833 – Nov 1, 1837 | Re-elected in 1834. Resigned. | 9 | 25th | 9 | Re-elected in 1837. Retired. | Jan 12, 1835 – Mar 3, 1843 | Democratic | Alfred Cuthbert (Monticello) | 8 |
| Vacant | | | Nov 1, 1837 – Nov 22, 1837 | | 9 | 25th | 9 | Re-elected in 1837. Retired. | Jan 12, 1835 – Mar 3, 1843 | Democratic | Alfred Cuthbert (Monticello) | 8 |
| 18 | Wilson Lumpkin (Athens) | Democratic | Nov 22, 1837 – Mar 3, 1841 | Elected to finish King's term. | 9 | 25th | 9 | Re-elected in 1837. Retired. | Jan 12, 1835 – Mar 3, 1843 | Democratic | Alfred Cuthbert (Monticello) | 8 |
| 18 | Wilson Lumpkin (Athens) | Democratic | Nov 22, 1837 – Mar 3, 1841 | Elected to finish King's term. | 9 | 26th | 9 | Re-elected in 1837. Retired. | Jan 12, 1835 – Mar 3, 1843 | Democratic | Alfred Cuthbert (Monticello) | 8 |
| 19 | John M. Berrien (Savannah) | Whig | Mar 4, 1841 – May 28, 1845 | Elected in 1840. Resigned to become judge of the Supreme Court of Georgia. | 10 | 27th | 9 | Re-elected in 1837. Retired. | Jan 12, 1835 – Mar 3, 1843 | Democratic | Alfred Cuthbert (Monticello) | 8 |
| 19 | John M. Berrien (Savannah) | Whig | Mar 4, 1841 – May 28, 1845 | Elected in 1840. Resigned to become judge of the Supreme Court of Georgia. | 10 | 28th | 10 | Elected in 1843. Resigned. | Mar 4, 1843 – Feb 4, 1848 | Democratic | Walter T. Colquitt (Columbus) | 9 |
| 19 | John M. Berrien (Savannah) | Whig | Mar 4, 1841 – May 28, 1845 | Elected in 1840. Resigned to become judge of the Supreme Court of Georgia. | 10 | 29th | 10 | Elected in 1843. Resigned. | Mar 4, 1843 – Feb 4, 1848 | Democratic | Walter T. Colquitt (Columbus) | 9 |
| 19 | Vacant | | May 28, 1845 – Nov 13, 1845 | | 10 | 29th | 10 | Elected in 1843. Resigned. | Mar 4, 1843 – Feb 4, 1848 | Democratic | Walter T. Colquitt (Columbus) | 9 |
| 19 | John M. Berrien (Savannah) | Whig | Nov 13, 1845 – May 28, 1852 | Elected to finish his own term. | 10 | 29th | 10 | Elected in 1843. Resigned. | Mar 4, 1843 – Feb 4, 1848 | Democratic | Walter T. Colquitt (Columbus) | 9 |
| 19 | John M. Berrien (Savannah) | Whig | Nov 13, 1845 – May 28, 1852 | Re-elected in 1846. Resigned. | 11 | 30th | 10 | Elected in 1843. Resigned. | Mar 4, 1843 – Feb 4, 1848 | Democratic | Walter T. Colquitt (Columbus) | 9 |
| 19 | John M. Berrien (Savannah) | Whig | Nov 13, 1845 – May 28, 1852 | Re-elected in 1846. Resigned. | 11 | 30th | 10 | Appointed to finish Colquitt's term. Retired. | Feb 4, 1848 – Mar 3, 1849 | Democratic | Herschel V. Johnson (Milledgeville) | 10 |
| 19 | John M. Berrien (Savannah) | Whig | Nov 13, 1845 – May 28, 1852 | Re-elected in 1846. Resigned. | 11 | 31st | 11 | Elected in 1847 for the term beginning in 1849. [data missing] | Mar 4, 1849 – Mar 3, 1855 | Whig | William Crosby Dawson (Greensboro) | 11 |
| 19 | John M. Berrien (Savannah) | Whig | Nov 13, 1845 – May 28, 1852 | Re-elected in 1846. Resigned. | 11 | 32nd | 11 | Elected in 1847 for the term beginning in 1849. [data missing] | Mar 4, 1849 – Mar 3, 1855 | Whig | William Crosby Dawson (Greensboro) | 11 |
| Vacant | | | May 28, 1852 – May 31, 1852 | | 11 | 32nd | 11 | Elected in 1847 for the term beginning in 1849. [data missing] | Mar 4, 1849 – Mar 3, 1855 | Whig | William Crosby Dawson (Greensboro) | 11 |
| 20 | Robert M. Charlton (Savannah) | Democratic | May 31, 1852 – Mar 3, 1853 | Appointed to finish Berrien's term. | | 32nd | 11 | Elected in 1847 for the term beginning in 1849. [data missing] | Mar 4, 1849 – Mar 3, 1855 | Whig | William Crosby Dawson (Greensboro) | 11 |
| 21 | Robert Toombs (Washington) | Democratic | Mar 4, 1853 – Feb 4, 1861 | Elected in 1852. | 12 | 33rd | 11 | Elected in 1847 for the term beginning in 1849. [data missing] | Mar 4, 1849 – Mar 3, 1855 | Whig | William Crosby Dawson (Greensboro) | 11 |
| 21 | Robert Toombs (Washington) | Democratic | Mar 4, 1853 – Feb 4, 1861 | Elected in 1852. | 12 | 34th | 12 | Elected in 1854 or 1855. Withdrew. | Mar 4, 1855 – Jan 28, 1861 | Democratic | Alfred Iverson Sr. (Columbus) | 12 |
| 21 | Robert Toombs (Washington) | Democratic | Mar 4, 1853 – Feb 4, 1861 | Elected in 1852. | 12 | 35th | 12 | Elected in 1854 or 1855. Withdrew. | Mar 4, 1855 – Jan 28, 1861 | Democratic | Alfred Iverson Sr. (Columbus) | 12 |
| 21 | Robert Toombs (Washington) | Democratic | Mar 4, 1853 – Feb 4, 1861 | Re-elected in 1858. Withdrew. | 13 | 36th | 12 | Elected in 1854 or 1855. Withdrew. | Mar 4, 1855 – Jan 28, 1861 | Democratic | Alfred Iverson Sr. (Columbus) | 12 |
| 21 | Robert Toombs (Washington) | Democratic | Mar 4, 1853 – Feb 4, 1861 | Re-elected in 1858. Withdrew. | 13 | 36th | 12 | Civil War and Reconstruction | Jan 28, 1861 – Feb 1, 1871 | Vacant | | |
| Vacant | | | Feb 4, 1861 – Feb 24, 1871 | Civil War and Reconstruction | 13 | 36th | 12 | Civil War and Reconstruction | Jan 28, 1861 – Feb 1, 1871 | Vacant | | |
| Vacant | | | Feb 4, 1861 – Feb 24, 1871 | Civil War and Reconstruction | 13 | 37th | 13 | Civil War and Reconstruction | Jan 28, 1861 – Feb 1, 1871 | Vacant | | |
| Vacant | | | Feb 4, 1861 – Feb 24, 1871 | Civil War and Reconstruction | 13 | 38th | 13 | Civil War and Reconstruction | Jan 28, 1861 – Feb 1, 1871 | Vacant | | |
| Vacant | | | Feb 4, 1861 – Feb 24, 1871 | Civil War and Reconstruction | 14 | 39th | 13 | Civil War and Reconstruction | Jan 28, 1861 – Feb 1, 1871 | Vacant | | |
| Vacant | | | Feb 4, 1861 – Feb 24, 1871 | Civil War and Reconstruction | 14 | 40th | 14 | Civil War and Reconstruction | Jan 28, 1861 – Feb 1, 1871 | Vacant | | |
| Vacant | | | Feb 4, 1861 – Feb 24, 1871 | Civil War and Reconstruction | 14 | 41st | 14 | Civil War and Reconstruction | Jan 28, 1861 – Feb 1, 1871 | Vacant | | |
| Vacant | | | Feb 4, 1861 – Feb 24, 1871 | Civil War and Reconstruction | 14 | 41st | 14 | Elected in 1867 to finish the term, but not seated until Georgia's readmission. Retired. | Feb 1, 1871 – Mar 3, 1873 | Republican | Joshua Hill (Madison) | 13 |
| 22 | Homer V. M. Miller (Rome) | Democratic | Feb 24, 1871 – Mar 3, 1871 | Elected to finish term. | 14 | 41st | 14 | Elected in 1867 to finish the term, but not seated until Georgia's readmission. Retired. | Feb 1, 1871 – Mar 3, 1873 | Republican | Joshua Hill (Madison) | 13 |
| Vacant | | | Mar 4, 1871 – Nov 14, 1871 | Foster Blodgett (R) presented credentials as Senator-elect, but the Senate declared him not elected. | 15 | 42nd | 14 | Elected in 1867 to finish the term, but not seated until Georgia's readmission. Retired. | Feb 1, 1871 – Mar 3, 1873 | Republican | Joshua Hill (Madison) | 13 |
| 23 | Thomas M. Norwood (Savannah) | Democratic | Nov 14, 1871 – Mar 3, 1877 | Elected after Blodgett's credentials were rejected. Lost re-election. | 15 | 42nd | 14 | Elected in 1867 to finish the term, but not seated until Georgia's readmission. Retired. | Feb 1, 1871 – Mar 3, 1873 | Republican | Joshua Hill (Madison) | 13 |
| 23 | Thomas M. Norwood (Savannah) | Democratic | Nov 14, 1871 – Mar 3, 1877 | Elected after Blodgett's credentials were rejected. Lost re-election. | 15 | 43rd | 15 | Elected in 1873. | Mar 4, 1873 – May 26, 1880 | Democratic | John B. Gordon (Atlanta) | 14 |
| 23 | Thomas M. Norwood (Savannah) | Democratic | Nov 14, 1871 – Mar 3, 1877 | Elected after Blodgett's credentials were rejected. Lost re-election. | 15 | 44th | 15 | Elected in 1873. | Mar 4, 1873 – May 26, 1880 | Democratic | John B. Gordon (Atlanta) | 14 |
| 24 | Benjamin Harvey Hill (Atlanta) | Democratic | Mar 4, 1877 – Aug 16, 1882 | Elected in 1877. Died. | 16 | 45th | 15 | Elected in 1873. | Mar 4, 1873 – May 26, 1880 | Democratic | John B. Gordon (Atlanta) | 14 |
| 24 | Benjamin Harvey Hill (Atlanta) | Democratic | Mar 4, 1877 – Aug 16, 1882 | Elected in 1877. Died. | 16 | 46th | 16 | Re-elected in 1879. Resigned to promote a venture for the Georgia Pacific Railway. | Mar 4, 1873 – May 26, 1880 | Democratic | John B. Gordon (Atlanta) | 14 |
| 24 | Benjamin Harvey Hill (Atlanta) | Democratic | Mar 4, 1877 – Aug 16, 1882 | Elected in 1877. Died. | 16 | 46th | 16 | Elected to finish Gordon's term. | May 26, 1880 – Mar 3, 1891 | Democratic | Joseph E. Brown (Atlanta) | 15 |
| 24 | Benjamin Harvey Hill (Atlanta) | Democratic | Mar 4, 1877 – Aug 16, 1882 | Elected in 1877. Died. | 16 | 47th | 16 | Elected to finish Gordon's term. | May 26, 1880 – Mar 3, 1891 | Democratic | Joseph E. Brown (Atlanta) | 15 |
| Vacant | | | Aug 16, 1882 – Nov 15, 1882 | | 16 | 47th | 16 | Elected to finish Gordon's term. | May 26, 1880 – Mar 3, 1891 | Democratic | Joseph E. Brown (Atlanta) | 15 |
| 25 | Middleton P. Barrow (Athens) | Democratic | Nov 15, 1882 – Mar 3, 1883 | Elected to finish Hill's term. Retired. | 16 | 47th | 16 | Elected to finish Gordon's term. | May 26, 1880 – Mar 3, 1891 | Democratic | Joseph E. Brown (Atlanta) | 15 |
| 26 | Alfred H. Colquitt (Atlanta) | Democratic | Mar 4, 1883 – Mar 26, 1894 | Elected in 1883. | 17 | 48th | 16 | Elected to finish Gordon's term. | May 26, 1880 – Mar 3, 1891 | Democratic | Joseph E. Brown (Atlanta) | 15 |
| 26 | Alfred H. Colquitt (Atlanta) | Democratic | Mar 4, 1883 – Mar 26, 1894 | Elected in 1883. | 17 | 49th | 17 | Re-elected in 1885. Retired due to illness. | May 26, 1880 – Mar 3, 1891 | Democratic | Joseph E. Brown (Atlanta) | 15 |
| 26 | Alfred H. Colquitt (Atlanta) | Democratic | Mar 4, 1883 – Mar 26, 1894 | Elected in 1883. | 17 | 50th | 17 | Re-elected in 1885. Retired due to illness. | May 26, 1880 – Mar 3, 1891 | Democratic | Joseph E. Brown (Atlanta) | 15 |
| 26 | Alfred H. Colquitt (Atlanta) | Democratic | Mar 4, 1883 – Mar 26, 1894 | Re-elected in 1888 Died. | 18 | 51st | 17 | Re-elected in 1885. Retired due to illness. | May 26, 1880 – Mar 3, 1891 | Democratic | Joseph E. Brown (Atlanta) | 15 |
| 26 | Alfred H. Colquitt (Atlanta) | Democratic | Mar 4, 1883 – Mar 26, 1894 | Re-elected in 1888 Died. | 18 | 52nd | 18 | Elected in 1890. Retired. | Mar 4, 1891 – Mar 3, 1897 | Democratic | John B. Gordon (Atlanta) | 16 |
| 26 | Alfred H. Colquitt (Atlanta) | Democratic | Mar 4, 1883 – Mar 26, 1894 | Re-elected in 1888 Died. | 18 | 53rd | 18 | Elected in 1890. Retired. | Mar 4, 1891 – Mar 3, 1897 | Democratic | John B. Gordon (Atlanta) | 16 |
| Vacant | | | Mar 26, 1894 – Apr 2, 1894 | | 18 | 53rd | 18 | Elected in 1890. Retired. | Mar 4, 1891 – Mar 3, 1897 | Democratic | John B. Gordon (Atlanta) | 16 |
| 27 | Patrick Walsh (Augusta) | Democratic | Apr 2, 1894 – Mar 3, 1895 | Appointed to continue Colquitt's term. Elected in 1894 to finish Colquitt's term. Lost renomination. | 18 | 53rd | 18 | Elected in 1890. Retired. | Mar 4, 1891 – Mar 3, 1897 | Democratic | John B. Gordon (Atlanta) | 16 |
| 28 | Augustus Octavius Bacon (Macon) | Democratic | Mar 4, 1895 – Feb 14, 1914 | Elected in 1894. | 19 | 54th | 18 | Elected in 1890. Retired. | Mar 4, 1891 – Mar 3, 1897 | Democratic | John B. Gordon (Atlanta) | 16 |
| 28 | Augustus Octavius Bacon (Macon) | Democratic | Mar 4, 1895 – Feb 14, 1914 | Elected in 1894. | 19 | 55th | 19 | Elected in 1896. | Mar 4, 1897 – Nov 13, 1910 | Democratic | Alexander S. Clay (Marietta) | 17 |
| 28 | Augustus Octavius Bacon (Macon) | Democratic | Mar 4, 1895 – Feb 14, 1914 | Elected in 1894. | 19 | 56th | 19 | Elected in 1896. | Mar 4, 1897 – Nov 13, 1910 | Democratic | Alexander S. Clay (Marietta) | 17 |
| 28 | Augustus Octavius Bacon (Macon) | Democratic | Mar 4, 1895 – Feb 14, 1914 | Re-elected in 1900. Legislature failed to elect. | 20 | 57th | 19 | Elected in 1896. | Mar 4, 1897 – Nov 13, 1910 | Democratic | Alexander S. Clay (Marietta) | 17 |
| 28 | Augustus Octavius Bacon (Macon) | Democratic | Mar 4, 1895 – Feb 14, 1914 | Re-elected in 1900. Legislature failed to elect. | 20 | 58th | 20 | Re-elected in 1902. | Mar 4, 1897 – Nov 13, 1910 | Democratic | Alexander S. Clay (Marietta) | 17 |
| 28 | Augustus Octavius Bacon (Macon) | Democratic | Mar 4, 1895 – Feb 14, 1914 | Re-elected in 1900. Legislature failed to elect. | 20 | 59th | 20 | Re-elected in 1902. | Mar 4, 1897 – Nov 13, 1910 | Democratic | Alexander S. Clay (Marietta) | 17 |
| 28 | Augustus Octavius Bacon (Macon) | Democratic | Mar 4, 1895 – Feb 14, 1914 | Appointed to begin the next term. Re-elected in 1907. Legislature failed to elect. | 21 | 60th | 20 | Re-elected in 1902. | Mar 4, 1897 – Nov 13, 1910 | Democratic | Alexander S. Clay (Marietta) | 17 |
| 28 | Augustus Octavius Bacon (Macon) | Democratic | Mar 4, 1895 – Feb 14, 1914 | Appointed to begin the next term. Re-elected in 1907. Legislature failed to elect. | 21 | 61st | 21 | Re-elected in 1909. Died. | Mar 4, 1897 – Nov 13, 1910 | Democratic | Alexander S. Clay (Marietta) | 17 |
| 28 | Augustus Octavius Bacon (Macon) | Democratic | Mar 4, 1895 – Feb 14, 1914 | Appointed to begin the next term. Re-elected in 1907. Legislature failed to elect. | 21 | 61st | 21 | | Nov 13, 1910 – Nov 17, 1910 | Vacant | | |
| 28 | Augustus Octavius Bacon (Macon) | Democratic | Mar 4, 1895 – Feb 14, 1914 | Appointed to begin the next term. Re-elected in 1907. Legislature failed to elect. | 21 | 61st | 21 | Appointed to continue Clay's term. Lost election to finish Clay's term. | Nov 17, 1910 – Jul 14, 1911 | Democratic | Joseph M. Terrell (Greenville) | 18 |
| 28 | Augustus Octavius Bacon (Macon) | Democratic | Mar 4, 1895 – Feb 14, 1914 | Appointed to begin the next term. Re-elected in 1907. Legislature failed to elect. | 21 | 62nd | 21 | Appointed to continue Clay's term. Lost election to finish Clay's term. | Nov 17, 1910 – Jul 14, 1911 | Democratic | Joseph M. Terrell (Greenville) | 18 |
| 28 | Augustus Octavius Bacon (Macon) | Democratic | Mar 4, 1895 – Feb 14, 1914 | Appointed to begin the next term. Re-elected in 1907. Legislature failed to elect. | 21 | 62nd | 21 | Elected to finish Clay's term. Did not take office until Nov 16 upon resigning as Governor of Georgia. | Jul 14, 1911 – Mar 3, 1921 | Democratic | Hoke Smith (Atlanta) | 19 |
| 28 | Augustus Octavius Bacon (Macon) | Democratic | Mar 4, 1895 – Feb 14, 1914 | Appointed to begin the term. Re-elected in 1913, the first election by popular vote. Died. | 22 | 63rd | 21 | Elected to finish Clay's term. Did not take office until Nov 16 upon resigning as Governor of Georgia. | Jul 14, 1911 – Mar 3, 1921 | Democratic | Hoke Smith (Atlanta) | 19 |
| Vacant | | | Feb 14, 1914 – Mar 2, 1914 | | 22 | 63rd | 21 | Elected to finish Clay's term. Did not take office until Nov 16 upon resigning as Governor of Georgia. | Jul 14, 1911 – Mar 3, 1921 | Democratic | Hoke Smith (Atlanta) | 19 |
| 29 | William S. West (Valdosta) | Democratic | Mar 2, 1914 – Nov 3, 1914 | Appointed to continue Bacon's term. Successor elected. | 22 | 63rd | 21 | Elected to finish Clay's term. Did not take office until Nov 16 upon resigning as Governor of Georgia. | Jul 14, 1911 – Mar 3, 1921 | Democratic | Hoke Smith (Atlanta) | 19 |
| 30 | Thomas W. Hardwick (Sandersville) | Democratic | Nov 4, 1914 – Mar 3, 1919 | Elected to finish Bacon's term. Lost renomination. | 22 | 63rd | 21 | Elected to finish Clay's term. Did not take office until Nov 16 upon resigning as Governor of Georgia. | Jul 14, 1911 – Mar 3, 1921 | Democratic | Hoke Smith (Atlanta) | 19 |
| 30 | Thomas W. Hardwick (Sandersville) | Democratic | Nov 4, 1914 – Mar 3, 1919 | Elected to finish Bacon's term. Lost renomination. | 22 | 64th | 22 | Re-elected in 1914. Lost renomination. | Jul 14, 1911 – Mar 3, 1921 | Democratic | Hoke Smith (Atlanta) | 19 |
| 30 | Thomas W. Hardwick (Sandersville) | Democratic | Nov 4, 1914 – Mar 3, 1919 | Elected to finish Bacon's term. Lost renomination. | 22 | 65th | 22 | Re-elected in 1914. Lost renomination. | Jul 14, 1911 – Mar 3, 1921 | Democratic | Hoke Smith (Atlanta) | 19 |
| 31 | William J. Harris (Cedartown) | Democratic | Mar 4, 1919 – Apr 18, 1932 | Elected in 1918. | 23 | 66th | 22 | Re-elected in 1914. Lost renomination. | Jul 14, 1911 – Mar 3, 1921 | Democratic | Hoke Smith (Atlanta) | 19 |
| 31 | William J. Harris (Cedartown) | Democratic | Mar 4, 1919 – Apr 18, 1932 | Elected in 1918. | 23 | 67th | 23 | Elected in 1920. Died. | Mar 4, 1921 – Sep 26, 1922 | Democratic | Thomas E. Watson (Thomson) | 20 |
| 31 | William J. Harris (Cedartown) | Democratic | Mar 4, 1919 – Apr 18, 1932 | Elected in 1918. | 23 | 67th | 23 | | Sep 26, 1922 – Oct 3, 1922 | Vacant | | |
| 31 | William J. Harris (Cedartown) | Democratic | Mar 4, 1919 – Apr 18, 1932 | Elected in 1918. | 23 | 67th | 23 | Appointed to continue Watson's term. Retired. | Oct 3, 1922 – Nov 21, 1922 | Democratic | Rebecca Latimer Felton (Cartersville) | 21 |
| 31 | William J. Harris (Cedartown) | Democratic | Mar 4, 1919 – Apr 18, 1932 | Elected in 1918. | 23 | 67th | 23 | Elected to finish Watson's term. | Nov 22, 1922 – Jan 3, 1957 | Democratic | Walter F. George (Vienna) | 22 |
| 31 | William J. Harris (Cedartown) | Democratic | Mar 4, 1919 – Apr 18, 1932 | Elected in 1918. | 23 | 68th | 23 | Elected to finish Watson's term. | Nov 22, 1922 – Jan 3, 1957 | Democratic | Walter F. George (Vienna) | 22 |
| 31 | William J. Harris (Cedartown) | Democratic | Mar 4, 1919 – Apr 18, 1932 | Re-elected in 1924. | 24 | 69th | 23 | Elected to finish Watson's term. | Nov 22, 1922 – Jan 3, 1957 | Democratic | Walter F. George (Vienna) | 22 |
| 31 | William J. Harris (Cedartown) | Democratic | Mar 4, 1919 – Apr 18, 1932 | Re-elected in 1924. | 24 | 70th | 24 | Re-elected in 1926. | Nov 22, 1922 – Jan 3, 1957 | Democratic | Walter F. George (Vienna) | 22 |
| 31 | William J. Harris (Cedartown) | Democratic | Mar 4, 1919 – Apr 18, 1932 | Re-elected in 1924. | 24 | 71st | 24 | Re-elected in 1926. | Nov 22, 1922 – Jan 3, 1957 | Democratic | Walter F. George (Vienna) | 22 |
| 31 | William J. Harris (Cedartown) | Democratic | Mar 4, 1919 – Apr 18, 1932 | Re-elected in 1930. Died. | 25 | 72nd | 24 | Re-elected in 1926. | Nov 22, 1922 – Jan 3, 1957 | Democratic | Walter F. George (Vienna) | 22 |
| Vacant | | | Apr 18, 1932 – Apr 25, 1932 | | 25 | 72nd | 24 | Re-elected in 1926. | Nov 22, 1922 – Jan 3, 1957 | Democratic | Walter F. George (Vienna) | 22 |
| 32 | John S. Cohen (Atlanta) | Democratic | Apr 25, 1932 – Jan 11, 1933 | Appointed to continue Harris's term. Successor elected. | 25 | 72nd | 24 | Re-elected in 1926. | Nov 22, 1922 – Jan 3, 1957 | Democratic | Walter F. George (Vienna) | 22 |
| 33 | Richard Russell Jr. (Winder) | Democratic | Jan 12, 1933 – Jan 21, 1971 | Elected in 1932 to finish Harris's term. | 25 | 72nd | 24 | Re-elected in 1926. | Nov 22, 1922 – Jan 3, 1957 | Democratic | Walter F. George (Vienna) | 22 |
| 33 | Richard Russell Jr. (Winder) | Democratic | Jan 12, 1933 – Jan 21, 1971 | Elected in 1932 to finish Harris's term. | 25 | 73rd | 25 | Re-elected in 1932. | Nov 22, 1922 – Jan 3, 1957 | Democratic | Walter F. George (Vienna) | 22 |
| 33 | Richard Russell Jr. (Winder) | Democratic | Jan 12, 1933 – Jan 21, 1971 | Elected in 1932 to finish Harris's term. | 25 | 74th | 25 | Re-elected in 1932. | Nov 22, 1922 – Jan 3, 1957 | Democratic | Walter F. George (Vienna) | 22 |
| 33 | Richard Russell Jr. (Winder) | Democratic | Jan 12, 1933 – Jan 21, 1971 | Re-elected in 1936. | 26 | 75th | 25 | Re-elected in 1932. | Nov 22, 1922 – Jan 3, 1957 | Democratic | Walter F. George (Vienna) | 22 |
| 33 | Richard Russell Jr. (Winder) | Democratic | Jan 12, 1933 – Jan 21, 1971 | Re-elected in 1936. | 26 | 76th | 26 | Re-elected in 1938. | Nov 22, 1922 – Jan 3, 1957 | Democratic | Walter F. George (Vienna) | 22 |
| 33 | Richard Russell Jr. (Winder) | Democratic | Jan 12, 1933 – Jan 21, 1971 | Re-elected in 1936. | 26 | 77th | 26 | Re-elected in 1938. | Nov 22, 1922 – Jan 3, 1957 | Democratic | Walter F. George (Vienna) | 22 |
| 33 | Richard Russell Jr. (Winder) | Democratic | Jan 12, 1933 – Jan 21, 1971 | Re-elected in 1942. | 27 | 78th | 26 | Re-elected in 1938. | Nov 22, 1922 – Jan 3, 1957 | Democratic | Walter F. George (Vienna) | 22 |
| 33 | Richard Russell Jr. (Winder) | Democratic | Jan 12, 1933 – Jan 21, 1971 | Re-elected in 1942. | 27 | 79th | 27 | Re-elected in 1944. | Nov 22, 1922 – Jan 3, 1957 | Democratic | Walter F. George (Vienna) | 22 |
| 33 | Richard Russell Jr. (Winder) | Democratic | Jan 12, 1933 – Jan 21, 1971 | Re-elected in 1942. | 27 | 80th | 27 | Re-elected in 1944. | Nov 22, 1922 – Jan 3, 1957 | Democratic | Walter F. George (Vienna) | 22 |
| 33 | Richard Russell Jr. (Winder) | Democratic | Jan 12, 1933 – Jan 21, 1971 | Re-elected in 1948. | 28 | 81st | 27 | Re-elected in 1944. | Nov 22, 1922 – Jan 3, 1957 | Democratic | Walter F. George (Vienna) | 22 |
| 33 | Richard Russell Jr. (Winder) | Democratic | Jan 12, 1933 – Jan 21, 1971 | Re-elected in 1948. | 28 | 82nd | 28 | Re-elected in 1950. Retired. | Nov 22, 1922 – Jan 3, 1957 | Democratic | Walter F. George (Vienna) | 22 |
| 33 | Richard Russell Jr. (Winder) | Democratic | Jan 12, 1933 – Jan 21, 1971 | Re-elected in 1948. | 28 | 83rd | 28 | Re-elected in 1950. Retired. | Nov 22, 1922 – Jan 3, 1957 | Democratic | Walter F. George (Vienna) | 22 |
| 33 | Richard Russell Jr. (Winder) | Democratic | Jan 12, 1933 – Jan 21, 1971 | Re-elected in 1954. | 29 | 84th | 28 | Re-elected in 1950. Retired. | Nov 22, 1922 – Jan 3, 1957 | Democratic | Walter F. George (Vienna) | 22 |
| 33 | Richard Russell Jr. (Winder) | Democratic | Jan 12, 1933 – Jan 21, 1971 | Re-elected in 1954. | 29 | 85th | 29 | Elected in 1956. | Jan 3, 1957 – Jan 3, 1981 | Democratic | Herman Talmadge (Lovejoy) | 23 |
| 33 | Richard Russell Jr. (Winder) | Democratic | Jan 12, 1933 – Jan 21, 1971 | Re-elected in 1954. | 29 | 86th | 29 | Elected in 1956. | Jan 3, 1957 – Jan 3, 1981 | Democratic | Herman Talmadge (Lovejoy) | 23 |
| 33 | Richard Russell Jr. (Winder) | Democratic | Jan 12, 1933 – Jan 21, 1971 | Re-elected in 1960. | 30 | 87th | 29 | Elected in 1956. | Jan 3, 1957 – Jan 3, 1981 | Democratic | Herman Talmadge (Lovejoy) | 23 |
| 33 | Richard Russell Jr. (Winder) | Democratic | Jan 12, 1933 – Jan 21, 1971 | Re-elected in 1960. | 30 | 88th | 30 | Re-elected in 1962. | Jan 3, 1957 – Jan 3, 1981 | Democratic | Herman Talmadge (Lovejoy) | 23 |
| 33 | Richard Russell Jr. (Winder) | Democratic | Jan 12, 1933 – Jan 21, 1971 | Re-elected in 1960. | 30 | 89th | 30 | Re-elected in 1962. | Jan 3, 1957 – Jan 3, 1981 | Democratic | Herman Talmadge (Lovejoy) | 23 |
| 33 | Richard Russell Jr. (Winder) | Democratic | Jan 12, 1933 – Jan 21, 1971 | Re-elected in 1966. Died. | 31 | 90th | 30 | Re-elected in 1962. | Jan 3, 1957 – Jan 3, 1981 | Democratic | Herman Talmadge (Lovejoy) | 23 |
| 33 | Richard Russell Jr. (Winder) | Democratic | Jan 12, 1933 – Jan 21, 1971 | Re-elected in 1966. Died. | 31 | 91st | 31 | Re-elected in 1968. | Jan 3, 1957 – Jan 3, 1981 | Democratic | Herman Talmadge (Lovejoy) | 23 |
| 33 | Richard Russell Jr. (Winder) | Democratic | Jan 12, 1933 – Jan 21, 1971 | Re-elected in 1966. Died. | 31 | 92nd | 31 | Re-elected in 1968. | Jan 3, 1957 – Jan 3, 1981 | Democratic | Herman Talmadge (Lovejoy) | 23 |
| Vacant | | | Jan 21, 1971 – Feb 1, 1971 | | 31 | 92nd | 31 | Re-elected in 1968. | Jan 3, 1957 – Jan 3, 1981 | Democratic | Herman Talmadge (Lovejoy) | 23 |
| 34 | David H. Gambrell (Atlanta) | Democratic | Feb 1, 1971 – Nov 7, 1972 | Appointed to continue Russell's term. Lost nomination to finish Russell's term. | 31 | 92nd | 31 | Re-elected in 1968. | Jan 3, 1957 – Jan 3, 1981 | Democratic | Herman Talmadge (Lovejoy) | 23 |
| 35 | Sam Nunn (Perry) | Democratic | Nov 8, 1972 – Jan 3, 1997 | Elected to finish Russell's term. | 31 | 92nd | 31 | Re-elected in 1968. | Jan 3, 1957 – Jan 3, 1981 | Democratic | Herman Talmadge (Lovejoy) | 23 |
| 35 | Sam Nunn (Perry) | Democratic | Nov 8, 1972 – Jan 3, 1997 | Elected to full term in 1972. | 32 | 93rd | 31 | Re-elected in 1968. | Jan 3, 1957 – Jan 3, 1981 | Democratic | Herman Talmadge (Lovejoy) | 23 |
| 35 | Sam Nunn (Perry) | Democratic | Nov 8, 1972 – Jan 3, 1997 | Elected to full term in 1972. | 32 | 94th | 32 | Re-elected in 1974. Lost re-election. | Jan 3, 1957 – Jan 3, 1981 | Democratic | Herman Talmadge (Lovejoy) | 23 |
| 35 | Sam Nunn (Perry) | Democratic | Nov 8, 1972 – Jan 3, 1997 | Elected to full term in 1972. | 32 | 95th | 32 | Re-elected in 1974. Lost re-election. | Jan 3, 1957 – Jan 3, 1981 | Democratic | Herman Talmadge (Lovejoy) | 23 |
| 35 | Sam Nunn (Perry) | Democratic | Nov 8, 1972 – Jan 3, 1997 | Re-elected in 1978. | 33 | 96th | 32 | Re-elected in 1974. Lost re-election. | Jan 3, 1957 – Jan 3, 1981 | Democratic | Herman Talmadge (Lovejoy) | 23 |
| 35 | Sam Nunn (Perry) | Democratic | Nov 8, 1972 – Jan 3, 1997 | Re-elected in 1978. | 33 | 97th | 33 | Elected in 1980. Lost re-election. | Jan 3, 1981 – Jan 3, 1987 | Republican | Mack Mattingly (St. Simons) | 24 |
| 35 | Sam Nunn (Perry) | Democratic | Nov 8, 1972 – Jan 3, 1997 | Re-elected in 1978. | 33 | 98th | 33 | Elected in 1980. Lost re-election. | Jan 3, 1981 – Jan 3, 1987 | Republican | Mack Mattingly (St. Simons) | 24 |
| 35 | Sam Nunn (Perry) | Democratic | Nov 8, 1972 – Jan 3, 1997 | Re-elected in 1984. | 34 | 99th | 33 | Elected in 1980. Lost re-election. | Jan 3, 1981 – Jan 3, 1987 | Republican | Mack Mattingly (St. Simons) | 24 |
| 35 | Sam Nunn (Perry) | Democratic | Nov 8, 1972 – Jan 3, 1997 | Re-elected in 1984. | 34 | 100th | 34 | Elected in 1986. Lost re-election. | Jan 3, 1987 – Jan 3, 1993 | Democratic | Wyche Fowler (Atlanta) | 25 |
| 35 | Sam Nunn (Perry) | Democratic | Nov 8, 1972 – Jan 3, 1997 | Re-elected in 1984. | 34 | 101st | 34 | Elected in 1986. Lost re-election. | Jan 3, 1987 – Jan 3, 1993 | Democratic | Wyche Fowler (Atlanta) | 25 |
| 35 | Sam Nunn (Perry) | Democratic | Nov 8, 1972 – Jan 3, 1997 | Re-elected in 1990. Retired. | 35 | 102nd | 34 | Elected in 1986. Lost re-election. | Jan 3, 1987 – Jan 3, 1993 | Democratic | Wyche Fowler (Atlanta) | 25 |
| 35 | Sam Nunn (Perry) | Democratic | Nov 8, 1972 – Jan 3, 1997 | Re-elected in 1990. Retired. | 35 | 103rd | 35 | Elected in 1992 in runoff election. | Jan 3, 1993 – Jul 18, 2000 | Republican | Paul Coverdell (Atlanta) | 26 |
| 35 | Sam Nunn (Perry) | Democratic | Nov 8, 1972 – Jan 3, 1997 | Re-elected in 1990. Retired. | 35 | 104th | 35 | Elected in 1992 in runoff election. | Jan 3, 1993 – Jul 18, 2000 | Republican | Paul Coverdell (Atlanta) | 26 |
| 36 | Max Cleland (Lithonia) | Democratic | Jan 3, 1997 – Jan 3, 2003 | Elected in 1996. Lost re-election. | 36 | 105th | 35 | Elected in 1992 in runoff election. | Jan 3, 1993 – Jul 18, 2000 | Republican | Paul Coverdell (Atlanta) | 26 |
| 36 | Max Cleland (Lithonia) | Democratic | Jan 3, 1997 – Jan 3, 2003 | Elected in 1996. Lost re-election. | 36 | 106th | 36 | Re-elected in 1998. Died. | Jan 3, 1993 – Jul 18, 2000 | Republican | Paul Coverdell (Atlanta) | 26 |
| 36 | Max Cleland (Lithonia) | Democratic | Jan 3, 1997 – Jan 3, 2003 | Elected in 1996. Lost re-election. | 36 | 106th | 36 | | July 18, 2000 – July 27, 2000 | Vacant | | |
| 36 | Max Cleland (Lithonia) | Democratic | Jan 3, 1997 – Jan 3, 2003 | Elected in 1996. Lost re-election. | 36 | 106th | 36 | Appointed to continue Coverdell's term. Elected in 2000 to finish Coverdell's term. Retired. | July 27, 2000 – Jan 3, 2005 | Democratic | Zell Miller (Young Harris) | 27 |
| 36 | Max Cleland (Lithonia) | Democratic | Jan 3, 1997 – Jan 3, 2003 | Elected in 1996. Lost re-election. | 36 | 107th | 36 | Appointed to continue Coverdell's term. Elected in 2000 to finish Coverdell's term. Retired. | July 27, 2000 – Jan 3, 2005 | Democratic | Zell Miller (Young Harris) | 27 |
| 37 | Saxby Chambliss (Moultrie) | Republican | Jan 3, 2003 – Jan 3, 2015 | Elected in 2002. | 37 | 108th | 36 | Appointed to continue Coverdell's term. Elected in 2000 to finish Coverdell's term. Retired. | July 27, 2000 – Jan 3, 2005 | Democratic | Zell Miller (Young Harris) | 27 |
| 37 | Saxby Chambliss (Moultrie) | Republican | Jan 3, 2003 – Jan 3, 2015 | Elected in 2002. | 37 | 109th | 37 | Elected in 2004. | Jan 3, 2005 – Dec 31, 2019 | Republican | Johnny Isakson (Marietta) | 28 |
| 37 | Saxby Chambliss (Moultrie) | Republican | Jan 3, 2003 – Jan 3, 2015 | Elected in 2002. | 37 | 110th | 37 | Elected in 2004. | Jan 3, 2005 – Dec 31, 2019 | Republican | Johnny Isakson (Marietta) | 28 |
| 37 | Saxby Chambliss (Moultrie) | Republican | Jan 3, 2003 – Jan 3, 2015 | Re-elected in 2008 in runoff election. Retired. | 38 | 111th | 37 | Elected in 2004. | Jan 3, 2005 – Dec 31, 2019 | Republican | Johnny Isakson (Marietta) | 28 |
| 37 | Saxby Chambliss (Moultrie) | Republican | Jan 3, 2003 – Jan 3, 2015 | Re-elected in 2008 in runoff election. Retired. | 38 | 112th | 38 | Re-elected in 2010. | Jan 3, 2005 – Dec 31, 2019 | Republican | Johnny Isakson (Marietta) | 28 |
| 37 | Saxby Chambliss (Moultrie) | Republican | Jan 3, 2003 – Jan 3, 2015 | Re-elected in 2008 in runoff election. Retired. | 38 | 113th | 38 | Re-elected in 2010. | Jan 3, 2005 – Dec 31, 2019 | Republican | Johnny Isakson (Marietta) | 28 |
| 38 | David Perdue (Sea Island) | Republican | Jan 3, 2015 – Jan 3, 2021 | Elected in 2014. Term expired before runoff election. Lost re-election. | 39 | 114th | 38 | Re-elected in 2010. | Jan 3, 2005 – Dec 31, 2019 | Republican | Johnny Isakson (Marietta) | 28 |
| 38 | David Perdue (Sea Island) | Republican | Jan 3, 2015 – Jan 3, 2021 | Elected in 2014. Term expired before runoff election. Lost re-election. | 39 | 115th | 39 | Re-elected in 2016. Resigned. | Jan 3, 2005 – Dec 31, 2019 | Republican | Johnny Isakson (Marietta) | 28 |
| 38 | David Perdue (Sea Island) | Republican | Jan 3, 2015 – Jan 3, 2021 | Elected in 2014. Term expired before runoff election. Lost re-election. | 39 | 116th | 39 | Re-elected in 2016. Resigned. | Jan 3, 2005 – Dec 31, 2019 | Republican | Johnny Isakson (Marietta) | 28 |
| 38 | David Perdue (Sea Island) | Republican | Jan 3, 2015 – Jan 3, 2021 | Elected in 2014. Term expired before runoff election. Lost re-election. | 39 | 116th | 39 | | Dec 31, 2019 – Jan 6, 2020 | Vacant | | |
| 38 | David Perdue (Sea Island) | Republican | Jan 3, 2015 – Jan 3, 2021 | Elected in 2014. Term expired before runoff election. Lost re-election. | 39 | 116th | 39 | Appointed to continue Isakson's term. Lost election to finish Isakson's term. | Jan 6, 2020 – Jan 20, 2021 | Republican | Kelly Loeffler (Atlanta) | 29 |
| Vacant | | | Jan 3, 2021 – Jan 20, 2021 | | 40 | 117th | 39 | Appointed to continue Isakson's term. Lost election to finish Isakson's term. | Jan 6, 2020 – Jan 20, 2021 | Republican | Kelly Loeffler (Atlanta) | 29 |
| 39 | Jon Ossoff (Atlanta) | Democratic | Jan 20, 2021 – present | Elected in 2021 in runoff election. | 40 | 117th | 39 | Elected in 2021 in runoff election to finish Isakson's term. | Jan 20, 2021 – present | Democratic | Raphael Warnock (Atlanta) | 30 |
| 39 | Jon Ossoff (Atlanta) | Democratic | Jan 20, 2021 – present | Elected in 2021 in runoff election. | 40 | 118th | 40 | Re-elected in 2022 in runoff election. | Jan 20, 2021 – present | Democratic | Raphael Warnock (Atlanta) | 30 |
| 39 | Jon Ossoff (Atlanta) | Democratic | Jan 20, 2021 – present | Elected in 2021 in runoff election. | 40 | 119th | 40 | Re-elected in 2022 in runoff election. | Jan 20, 2021 – present | Democratic | Raphael Warnock (Atlanta) | 30 |
| 39 | Jon Ossoff (Atlanta) | Democratic | Jan 20, 2021 – present | Re-elected in 2026. | 41 | 120th | 40 | Re-elected in 2022 in runoff election. | Jan 20, 2021 – present | Democratic | Raphael Warnock (Atlanta) | 30 |
| 39 | Jon Ossoff (Atlanta) | Democratic | Jan 20, 2021 – present | Re-elected in 2026. | 41 | 121st | 41 | To be determined in the 2028 election. | | | | |
| 39 | Jon Ossoff (Atlanta) | Democratic | Jan 20, 2021 – present | Re-elected in 2026. | 41 | 122nd | 41 | To be determined in the 2028 election. | | | | |
| To be determined in the 2032 election. | | | | | 42 | 123rd | 41 | To be determined in the 2028 election. | | | | |

== See also ==
- List of United States representatives from Georgia
- Georgia's congressional delegations
- Elections in Georgia (U.S. state)
