= Richard Russell Jr. =

American politician (1897–1971)

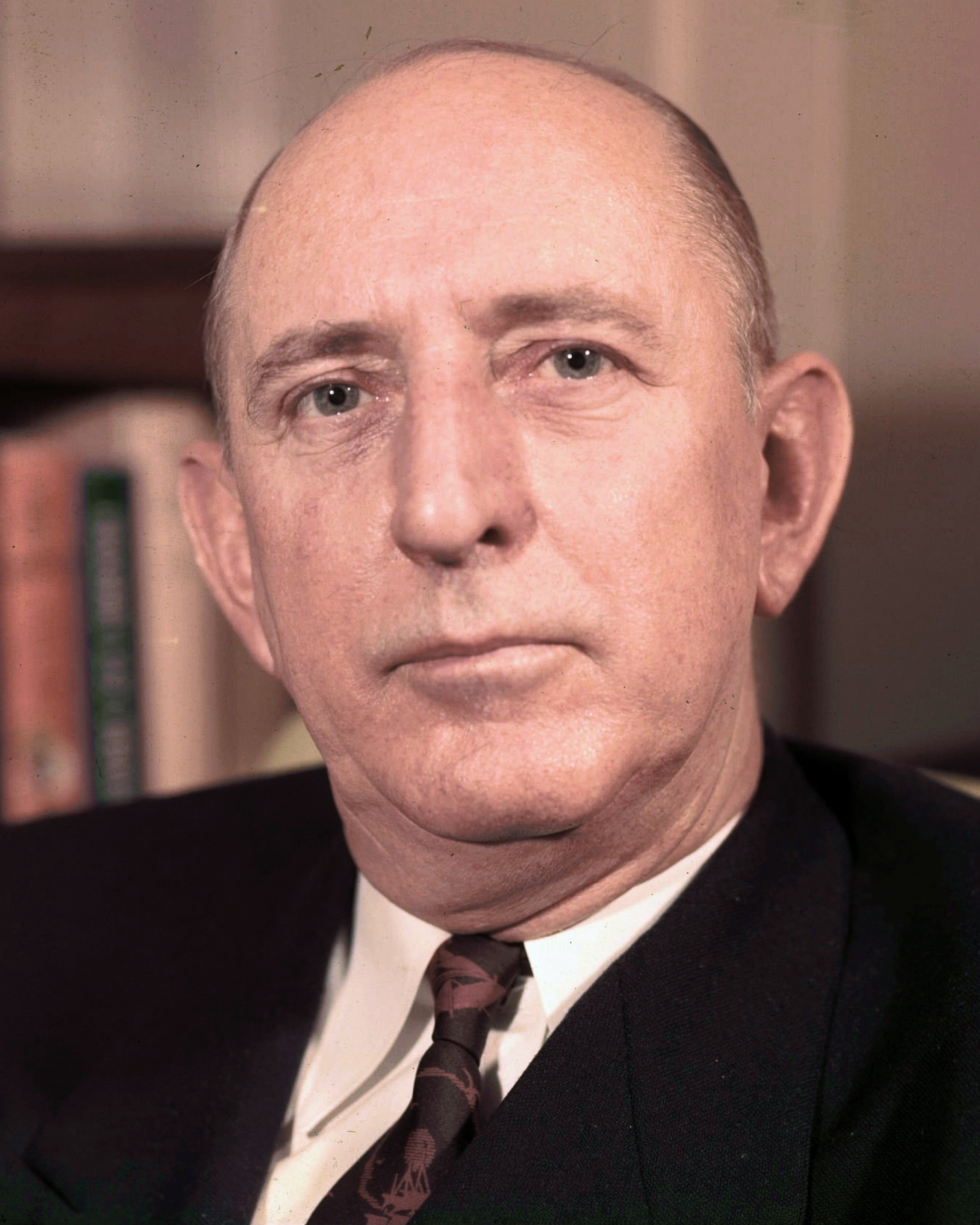
- Russell in 1952

President pro tempore of the United States Senate
- In office January 3, 1969 – January 21, 1971
- Preceded by: Carl Hayden
- Succeeded by: Allen J. Ellender

United States Senator from Georgia
- In office January 12, 1933 – January 21, 1971
- Preceded by: John S. Cohen
- Succeeded by: David H. Gambrell
Committee positions
Chair of the Senate Appropriations Committee
In office January 3, 1969 – January 21, 1971
Preceded by	Carl Hayden
Succeeded by	Allen Ellender
Chair of the Senate Armed Services Committee
In office January 3, 1955 – January 3, 1969
Preceded by	Leverett Saltonstall
Succeeded by	John C. Stennis
In office January 3, 1951 – January 3, 1953
Preceded by	Millard Tydings
Succeeded by	Leverett Saltonstall

66th Governor of Georgia
- In office June 27, 1931 – January 10, 1933
- Preceded by: Lamartine Griffin Hardman
- Succeeded by: Eugene Talmadge

Speaker of the Georgia House of Representatives
- In office 1927–1931
- Preceded by: William Cecil Neill
- Succeeded by: Arlie Daniel Tucker

Member of the Georgia House of Representatives from Barrow County
- In office 1921–1931
- Preceded by: G. A. Jones
- Succeeded by: George Thompson

Personal details
- Born: Richard Brevard Russell Jr. November 2, 1897 Winder, Georgia, U.S.
- Died: January 21, 1971 (aged 73) Washington, D.C., U.S.
- Party: Democratic
- Parents: Richard Russell Sr.; Ina Dillard Russell
- Relatives: Robert Lee Russell (brother); Alexander Brevard Russell (brother); John D. Russell (nephew)
- Education: Gordon State College; University of Georgia
- Profession: Attorney

Military service
- Branch/service: United States Navy; Naval Reserve
- Battles/wars: World War I
- Russell's voice Russell speaks on Southern opposition to the Civil Rights Act of 1957; Recorded 1957

Richard Brevard Russell Jr. (November 2, 1897 – January 21, 1971) was an American politician. A Southern Democrat, he served as the 66th governor of Georgia from 1931 to 1933 before serving in the United States Senate for almost 40 years, from 1933 to 1971. At his death he was the most senior member of the Senate. He was a leader of Southern opposition to the civil rights movement for decades.

Born in Winder, Georgia, Russell established a legal practice in Winder after graduating from the University of Georgia School of Law. He served in the Georgia House of Representatives from 1921 to 1931 before becoming Governor of Georgia. Russell won a special election to succeed Senator William J. Harris and joined the Senate in 1933. He supported the New Deal in his Senate career and was the chief sponsor of the National School Lunch Act, which provided free or low-cost school lunches to impoverished students.

During his long tenure in the Senate, Russell served as chairman of several committees, and was the Chairman of the Senate Committee on Armed Services for most of the period between 1951 and 1969. He was a candidate for President of the United States at the 1948 Democratic National Convention and the 1952 Democratic National Convention. He was also a member of the Warren Commission.

Russell supported racial segregation and co-authored the Southern Manifesto with Strom Thurmond. Russell and 17 fellow Democratic Senators, along with one Republican, blocked the passage of civil rights legislation via the filibuster. After Russell's protégé, President Lyndon B. Johnson, signed the Civil Rights Act of 1964 into law, Russell led a Southern boycott of the 1964 Democratic National Convention. Russell served in the Senate until his death from emphysema in 1971.

== Early life ==
Richard B. Russell Jr. was born in 1897 as the first son of Georgia Supreme Court Chief Justice Richard B. Russell Sr. and Ina Dillard Russell. He eventually had a total of twelve adult siblings, as well as two who died before adolescence.

Russell's father was a well-liked state representative for Clarke County and a successful solicitor general for a seven-county circuit. However, he fared poorly in multiple attempts to become U.S. Senator for Georgia and Governor of Georgia. Due to his political failures, the Russell family lived below their financial means at times.

From an early age, the elder Russell trained his son to exceed his father's legacy in the state. As a result of the family's loss of their ancestral plantation and mill during Sherman's March, Russell spent much time studying Civil War history.

Russell enrolled in the University of Georgia School of Law in 1915 and earned a Bachelor of Laws (LL.B.) degree in 1918. While at UGA, he was a member of the Phi Kappa Literary Society.

Dominated by white conservatives, Democrats controlled state government and the Congressional delegation. The Republican Party was no longer competitive, hollowed out in the state following the effective disenfranchisement of most blacks by Georgia's approval of a constitutional amendment, effective in 1908, requiring a literacy test, but providing a "grandfather clause" to create exceptions for whites.

== Early political career ==
Following his time at college, Russell briefly worked at a law firm with his father before successfully running for the Georgia House of Representatives at the earliest opportunity. Six years into his tenure, Russell ran unopposed for the Speakership at the age of 29. His popularity among his legislator colleagues came from his perceived integrity and willingness to build coalitions.

== Governor of Georgia (1931–1933) ==
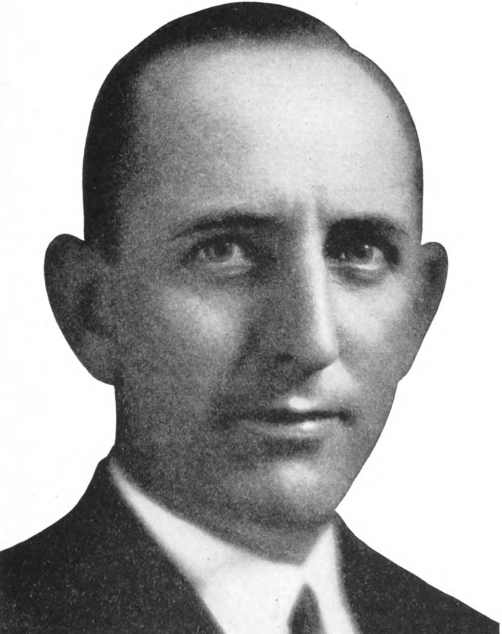
Russell as governor

Russell's campaign for Governor was an untraditional one: it was not based in Atlanta, and Russell at 33 would be the youngest Georgian Governor to that point if he was elected, but he did have the support of 90% of the state legislators. He won the election.

As governor, Russell reorganized the bureaucracy, reducing the number of state agencies from 102 to 18, promoted economic development in the midst of the Great Depression, and balanced the state budget.

During Russell's governorship, World War I veteran Robert Elliot Burns released the autobiography I Am A Fugitive from a Georgia Chain Gang!, which had previously been serialized in True Detective magazine and later formed the basis for a popular Paul Muni film in November 1932. The book details the multiple stints Burns served in the Georgia penal system and his attempts to escape.

Following the release of the book and the film adaptation, Russell attempted to extradite Burns from the state of New Jersey so Burns could continue to serve his sentence in Georgia. Russell denounced Burns' depictions of the horrific hard labor in his state, calling New Jersey Governor A. Harry Moore's refusal to return Burns to Georgia "a slander on the state of Georgia and its institutions."

== U.S. Senate career (1933–1971) ==
=== Electoral history ===
Russell's first campaign for the Senate was as a result of a special election in September 1932 after the death of William J. Harris. His opponent in the primary was Representative Charles Crisp, who was nicknamed "Kilowatt Charlie" due to his links to the unpopular Georgia Power Company.

In 1936, Russell defeated the former Democratic Governor Eugene Talmadge for the US Senate seat by defending the New Deal as good for Georgia.

=== New Deal ===
In 1933, when Russell came into the Senate, the Democrats had just ousted the Republicans as the majority party and thus many committee assignments became available. The vacancies and Russell's populist reputation from his time as Governor and his primary campaign meant that he got his first choice, Appropriations, in order to stop him becoming a second Huey Long. Due to a feud between Carter Glass, the chairman of the Appropriations committee, and the senior Democrat on the Appropriations Subcommittee on Agriculture, Ellison D. Smith, Russell became the chairman of that subcommittee. This assignment gave Russell extensive power over the funding of aid to farmers.

Russell supported the New Deal of President Franklin D. Roosevelt during the Great Depression. Russell was elected on a moderately progressive platform, and supported bailout and aid programs for local governments. Once in the Senate, he became an ardent supporter of the Roosevelt administration and New Deal programs, and expressed his support for "the fullest measure of relief that the combined resources of this commonwealth will afford." Russell endorsed almost every New Deal act during the "Hundred Days" Congress session; once a rift in the Democratic Party emerged in 1935, resulting in filibusters and deadlocks, Russell continued to support the President and the New Deal. Howard N. Mead observes that even "when many other Southern politicians began to express some measure of discontent with the administration and its proposals, Russell remained firm in his support". When competing with conservative Talmadge for the Georgia Senate seat, Russell expressed his fervent support for income tax and social welfare, consistently praised the New Deal in his speeches, and attacked Talmadge for his fiscal conservatism.

Once describing himself as "a liberal and progressive Democrat," Russell continued to be an outspoken economic progressive even after World War II, and was the main sponsor of the 1946 National School Lunch Act, which was eventually named after him. He expanded and carried out projects to distribute surplus food of Georgia to poor families through food stamps and school lunch programs, and wished to tackle rural poverty. After the establishment of a national school lunch program, Russell continuously pushed for funding it further throughout 1950s and 1960s, and sought active promotion and implementation of Georgian foods such as peanuts in the program. He saw this as a way to promote the interests of Georgian farmers. During the Johnson presidency however, Russell voted against the Economic Opportunity Act of 1964, despite sympathizing with its objectives, believing (as noted by one study) “that the legislation as too loosely drawn and would result in huge amounts of waste.”

=== Military and foreign policy ===
During World War II, Russell was known for his uncompromising position toward Japan and its civilian casualties. In the late months of the war, he held that the US should not treat Japan with more leniency than Germany, and that the United States should not encourage Japan to sue for peace.

Russell was a prominent supporter of a strong national defense. He used his powers as chairman of the Senate Armed Services Committee from 1951 to 1969, and then as chairman of the Senate Appropriations Committee as an institutional base to gain defense installations and jobs for Georgia. He was dubious about the Vietnam War, privately warning President Johnson repeatedly against deeper involvement, remarking to President Johnson in 1964 that "It’s a hell of a... hell of a situation. It’s a mess, and it's going to get worse."

=== Opposition to civil rights ===
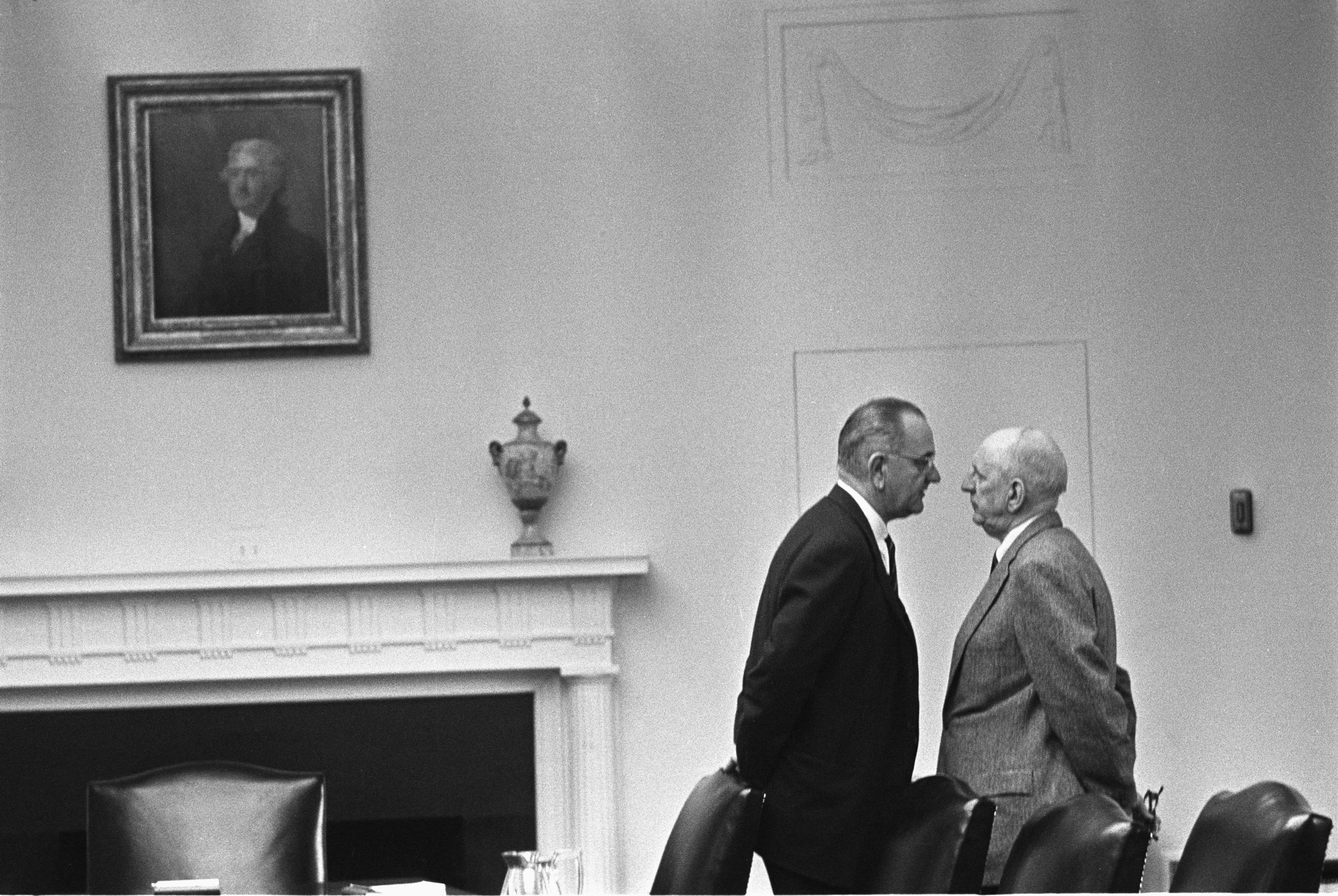
Russell and President Lyndon B. Johnson in 1963

Russell voted against the Civil Rights Act of 1957, the Civil Rights Act of 1960, the Civil Rights Act of 1964, and the Civil Rights Act of 1968 as well as the 24th Amendment to the U.S. Constitution and the Voting Rights Act of 1965.

Unlike Theodore Bilbo, "Cotton Ed" Smith, and James Eastland, who had reputations as ruthless, tough-talking, heavy-handed race baiters, Russell never justified hatred or acts of violence to defend segregation. But he strongly defended white supremacy and apparently did not question it or ever apologize for his segregationist views, votes and speeches. For decades Russell was a key figure in the Southern Caucus within the Senate that blocked or watered down meaningful civil rights legislation intended to protect African Americans from lynching, disenfranchisement, and disparate treatment under the law.

Russell strongly condemned President Truman's pro-desegregation stance and wrote that he was "sick at heart" over it. However, unlike many other Southern Democrats such as Strom Thurmond, he did not walk out of the convention and support the Dixiecrats.

In 1952, Russell was a candidate for the Democratic presidential nomination; while he did not discuss civil rights while campaigning, his platform named "local self-government" one of the major "Jeffersonian Principles". Russell claimed that the goal of his candidacy was to showcase the principles of "Southern Democracy" and to allow Southern Democrats to form a united front against the North. While he decisively defeated Estes Kefauver in the Florida primary, Russell was opposed by most of Democrats as he refused to support the civil rights plank of the party. Jim Rowe claimed that the sectional nature of the defeat shocked Russell and made him into a more parochial politician.

In early 1956, Russell's office was continually used as a meeting place by the Southern Caucus, and he was through most of the caucus's life the acknowledged leader of the group, sending out invitations to what he called "Constitutional Democrats". The caucus included fellow senators such as Strom Thurmond, James Eastland, Allen Ellender, and John Stennis, the four having a commonality of being dispirited with Brown v. Board of Education, the 1954 ruling by the US Supreme Court that said that segregation in public schools was unconstitutional.

Russell was one of the strongest opponents of every desegregation measure in the Senate, but he remained loyal to the party. Although he called the 1960 Democratic Party platform a "complete surrender to the NAACP and the other extreme radicals at Los Angeles", he did agree to campaign for the Kennedy-Johnson ticket for the 1960 United States presidential election.

In January 1964, President Johnson delivered the 1964 State of the Union Address, calling for Congress to "lift by legislation the bars of discrimination against those who seek entry into our country, particularly those who have much needed skills and those joining their families." Russell issued a statement afterward stating the commitment by Southern senators to oppose such a measure, which he called "shortsighted and disastrous," while admitting the high probability of it passing. He added that the civil rights bill's true intended effect was to intermingle races, eliminate states' rights, and abolish the checks and balances system.

Letter from Russell about Civil Rights Act

After Johnson signed the Civil Rights Act of 1964, Russell (along with more than a dozen other southern Senators, including Herman Talmadge and Russell Long) boycotted the 1964 Democratic National Convention in Atlantic City.

Although he had served as a prime mentor of Johnson, Russell and Johnson disagreed over civil rights. Johnson supported this as President. Russell, a segregationist, had repeatedly blocked and defeated federal civil rights legislation via use of the filibuster.

==== Perception on race issues ====
Russell was considered to be moderate in his support for segregation; in 1936, he often attacked race-baiting, such as the claim that New Deal legislation would mostly benefit black people. W. J. Cash considered Russell "the better sort of Southerner," as he was ready to call out "ruffian appeals to race hatred" made by others. James Thomas Gay claimed that Russell "wished blacks no ill;" in the 1950s, Russell corresponded with a black voter from Dublin, Georgia, Hercules Moore, who raised concerns that African-American children were being treated unfairly in the school lunch program, which was funded federally. Russell took the matter seriously and "later gave Moore satisfactory evidence that the program was being properly administered for children of both races.".

=== Abe Fortas nomination ===
Russell's support for first-term senator Lyndon B. Johnson paved the way for Johnson to become Senate Majority Leader. Russell often dined at Johnson's house during their Senate days. But, their 20-year friendship came to an end during Johnson's presidency, in a fight over the 1968 nomination as Chief Justice of Abe Fortas, Johnson's friend and Supreme Court justice.

In June 1968, Chief Justice Earl Warren announced his decision to retire. President Johnson afterward announced the nomination of Associate Justice Abe Fortas for the position. David Greenburg wrote that when Russell "decided in early July to oppose Fortas, he brought most of his fellow Dixiecrats with him."

=== Anti-Communism ===
In May 1961, President John F. Kennedy requested Russell place the Presidential wreath at the Tomb of the Unknowns during an appearance at Arlington National Cemetery for a Memorial Day ceremony.

Russell scheduled a closed door meeting for the Senate Armed Services Committee for August 31, 1961, at the time of Senator Strom Thurmond requesting the committee vote on whether to vote to investigate "a conspiracy to muzzle military anti-Communist drives."

In late February 1963, the Senate Armed Services Committee was briefed by Defense Secretary Robert McNamara on policy in the Caribbean. In response to what appeared to be an attack on an American shrimp boat by a "Russian Type Plane", Russell stated that he believed that it would be policy that American airmen would strike down any "Communist jets" in international waters that were attacking vessels, and only inquire on the aircraft's purpose there afterward.

== Warren Commission ==
From 1963 to 1964, Russell was one of the members of the Warren Commission, which was charged to investigate the assassination of President John F. Kennedy in November 1963. Originally Russell did not want to serve on the Warren Commission, telling President Lyndon B. Johnson that he did not like or have confidence in Earl Warren, who was to head the commission.

Russell's personal papers indicated that he was troubled by the Commission's single-bullet theory, the Soviet Union's failure to provide greater detail regarding Lee Harvey Oswald's period in Russia, and the lack of information regarding Oswald's Cuba-related activities. In a telephone conversation with President Johnson in September 1964 he expressed his disbelief in the single-bullet theory, to which Johnson replied that he did not believe it either.

In a January 1970 television interview, Russell stated that he accepted Oswald shot Kennedy but that he doubted he had acted alone, explaining that "too many things caused me to doubt that he planned it all by himself". Russell had written a dissenting opinion for the Warren Commission that "a number of suspicious circumstances" could not allow him to agree that there was no conspiracy to kill Kennedy and that citing a lack of evidence he believed this "preclude[d] the conclusive determination that Oswald and Oswald alone, without the knowledge, encouragement or assistance of any other person, planned and perpetrated the assassination". With Russell's agreement this statement was not included in the final report. Russell had also made a request to Warren that "Senator Russell dissents" be placed in a footnote of the final report, although he refused to do so, insisting that there must be unanimity among the Commission.

== Legacy ==
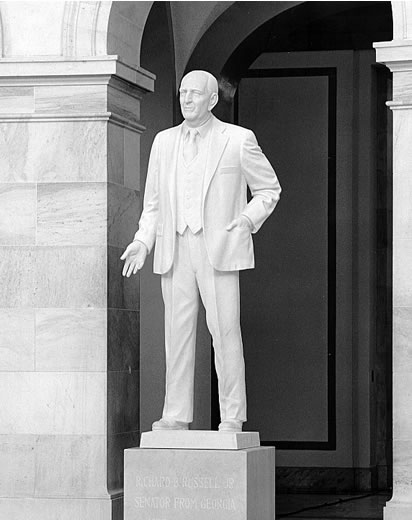
A statue of Russell by Frederick Hart is in the rotunda of the Russell Senate Office Building.

Russell was seen as a hero by many of the pro Jim Crow South. While undoubtedly a skilled politician of immense influence, his lifelong support of white supremacy has marred his legacy. Russell publicly said that America was "a white man's country, yes, and we are going to keep it that way." He also said he was vehemently opposed to "political and social equality with the Negro." Russell also supported poll taxes across the South and called President Truman's support of civil rights for black Americans an "uncalled-for attack on our Southern civilization."

Russell has been honored by having the following named for him:

- The Russell Senate Office Building, oldest of the three U.S. Senate office buildings. In 2018, Democratic Senate minority leader Charles Schumer called for the renaming of the building with the name of recently deceased Republican Senator John McCain.
- The Richard B. Russell Special Collections Building at the University of Georgia in Athens, Georgia, which houses the Hargrett Rare Book and Manuscript Library, the Russell Library for Political Research and Studies, the Walter J. Brown Media Archives, and the Peabody Awards Collection.
- Russell Hall, a co-ed dormitory for first-year students at the University of Georgia in Athens, Georgia.
- Russell Hall, a building at the University of Georgia College of Public Health that houses nineteen classrooms within the University of Georgia in Athens, Georgia.
- The Russell Auditorium at Georgia College and State University in Milledgeville, Georgia.
- Richard B. Russell Dam and Lake, part of the Richard B. Russell Multiple Resource Area, located on the upper Savannah River between Elberton, Georgia, and Calhoun Falls, South Carolina. A Georgia state park on the shores of that lake also bears Russell's name.
- The Richard B. Russell Airport in Rome, Georgia, the regional general aviation airport serving Floyd County, Georgia.
- Senator Russell's Sweet Potatoes are a favorite southern dish around the holidays.
- USS Richard B. Russell (SSN-687), a Sturgeon-class attack submarine.
- Richard B. Russell Highway, a part of the Russell–Brasstown Scenic Byway
- Richard B. Russell Parkway in Warner Robins, Georgia
- Richard B. Russell Middle School in Winder, Georgia

In 2020, former Georgia Board of Regents Chairman Sachin Shailendra and then Chancellor Steve Wrigley of the University System of Georgia tasked an advisory group to review the names of buildings and colleges across all campuses within the USG. Members of the advisory group consisted of Marion Fedrick, the tenth and current president of Albany State University in Albany, Georgia, Michael Patrick of Chick-fil-A, retired judge Herbert Phipps of the Georgia Court of Appeals, current chairman of the University of Georgia Foundation, Neal J. Quirk Sr., and Dr. Sally Wallace, the current dean of the Andrew Young School of Policy Studies of Georgia State University in Atlanta, Georgia.

Despite recommendations from the advisory group to rename all buildings associated with Russell, the Georgia Board of Regents did not move forward with any of the final recommendations from the advisory group's report.

== Further sources ==
=== Primary sources ===
- Logue, Calvin McLeod and Freshley, Dwight L., eds. (1997). Voice of Georgia: Speeches of Richard B. Russell, 1928–1969.
- Nixon, Richard. "Remarks Honoring the Late Senator Richard Brevard Russell in Atlanta, Georgia. January 23, 1971". American Reference Library – Primary Source Documents.

=== Scholarly secondary sources ===
External videos
- Booknotes interview with Gilbert Fite on Richard B. Russell Jr., Senator From Georgia, August 2, 1992 C-SPAN

- Barrett, David M. (Winter 1988). "The Mythology Surrounding Lyndon Johnson, His Advisers, and the 1965 Decision to Escalate the Vietnam War". Political Science Quarterly 103, no. 4: 637–63. doi:10.2307/2150900.
- Campbell, Charles E. (2013). Senator Richard B. Russell and My Career as a Trial Lawyer. Macon, GA: Mercer University Press.
- Caro, Robert A. (2002). The Years of Lyndon Johnson, Vol. 3: Master of the Senate.
- Fite, Gilbert (2002). Richard B. Russell Jr., Senator from Georgia;
- Finley, Keith M. (2008). Delaying the Dream: Southern Senators and the Fight Against Civil Rights, 1938–1965. Baton Rouge: LSU Press. ISBN 0807133450.
- Franklin, Sekou (2014). "The Elasticity of Anti-civil Rights Discourse: Albert Gore SR., Richard Russell, and Constituent Relations in the 1950s and 1960s". Social Identities. 20 (1): 90. doi:10.1080/13504630.2013.840574. S2CID 144032586.
- Gay, James Thomas (Winter 1996). "Richard B. Russell and the National School Lunch Program". The Georgia Historical Quarterly. 80 (4). Georgia Historical Society: 859–872. JSTOR 40583600.
- Goldsmith, John A. (1993). Colleagues: Richard B. Russell and His Apprentice, Lyndon B. Johnson.
- Grant, Philip A. Jr. (Summer 1973)). "Editorial Reaction to the 1952 Presidential Candidacy of Richard B. Russell". Georgia Historical Quarterly 57(2): 167–178. JSTOR 40579514.
- Mann, Robert (1996). The Walls of Jericho: Lyndon Johnson, Hubert Humphrey, Richard Russell and the Struggle for Civil Rights.
- Mead, Howard N. (1981). "Russell vs. Talmadge: Southern Politics and the New Deal". The Georgia Historical Quarterly. 65 (1). Georgia Historical Society: 28–45. JSTOR 40580744.
- Potenziani, David (Fall 1981). "Striking Back: Richard B. Russell and Racial Relocation". The Georgia Historical Quarterly 65, no. 3: 263–77. JSTOR 40580793.
- Shelley, Mack C. II (1983). The Permanent Majority: The Conservative Coalition in the United States Congress;.
- Stern, Mark (Fall 1991). "Lyndon Johnson and Richard Russell: Institutions, Ambitions and Civil Rights". Presidential Studies Quarterly 21, no. 4: 687–704. JSTOR 27550807.
- United States Congress. "Richard Russell Jr. (id: R000536)". Biographical Directory of the United States Congress.
- Ziemke, Caroline F. (Spring 1988). "Senator Richard B. Russell and the 'Lost Cause' in Vietnam, 1954–1968". Georgia Historical Quarterly. 72(1): 30–71. JSTOR 40581768.

Attribution

Party political offices
Preceded by Lamartine Griffin Hardman	Democratic nominee for Governor of Georgia; 1930	Succeeded by Eugene Talmadge
Preceded by William J. Harris	Democratic nominee for U.S. Senator from Georgia (Class 2); 1932, 1936, 1942, 1948, 1954, 1960, 1966	Succeeded by Sam Nunn
Political offices
Preceded by Lamartine G. Hardman	Governor of Georgia; 1931–1933	Succeeded by Eugene Talmadge
Preceded by Millard Tydings; Maryland	Chairman of the Senate Armed Services Committee; 1951–1953	Succeeded by Leverett Saltonstall; Massachusetts
Preceded by Leverett Saltonstall; Massachusetts	Chairman of the Senate Armed Services Committee; 1955–1969	Succeeded by John C. Stennis; Mississippi
Preceded by Carl T. Hayden; Arizona	President pro tempore of the United States Senate; 1969–1971	Succeeded by Allen J. Ellender; Louisiana
Preceded by Carl T. Hayden; Arizona	Chairman of the Senate Appropriations Committee; 1969–1971	Succeeded by Allen J. Ellender; Louisiana
U.S. Senate
Preceded by John S. Cohen	U.S. senator (Class 2) from Georgia; 1933–1971; Served alongside: Walter F. George, Herman Talmadge	Succeeded by David H. Gambrell
Honorary titles
Preceded by Carl T. Hayden; Arizona	Dean of the United States Senate; January 3, 1969 – January 21, 1971	Succeeded by Allen J. Ellender; Louisiana
