= McIntosh High School =

Public secondary school in Peachtree City, Georgia, United States

- School logo

Location
- 201 Walt Banks Road; Peachtree City, Georgia 30269; United States; 33°25′0.98″N 84°33′46.76″W

Information
- Type: Public secondary
- Motto: Motivating - Helping - Succeeding
- Established: 1981; 45 years ago
- School district: Fayette County School District
- Principal: Amy Hammock
- Teaching staff: 101.00 (FTE)
- Grades: 9–12
- Enrollment: 1,762 (2024–2025)
- Student to teacher ratio: 17.45
- Colors: Green, black and white
- Mascot: Chief
- Nickname: Chiefs
- Rival: Starr's Mill High School; Fayette County High School; Northgate High School (Newnan, Georgia)
- Website: McIntosh High School

McIntosh High School is a comprehensive four-year public secondary school located in Peachtree City, Georgia, United States, in Metro Atlanta. As of 2025, it has an enrollment of 1,762 students in grades nine through twelve. The school, part of the Fayette County School System, was named a Georgia School of Excellence in 2001. In 2007, it was named a National Blue Ribbon School of Excellence.

== History ==
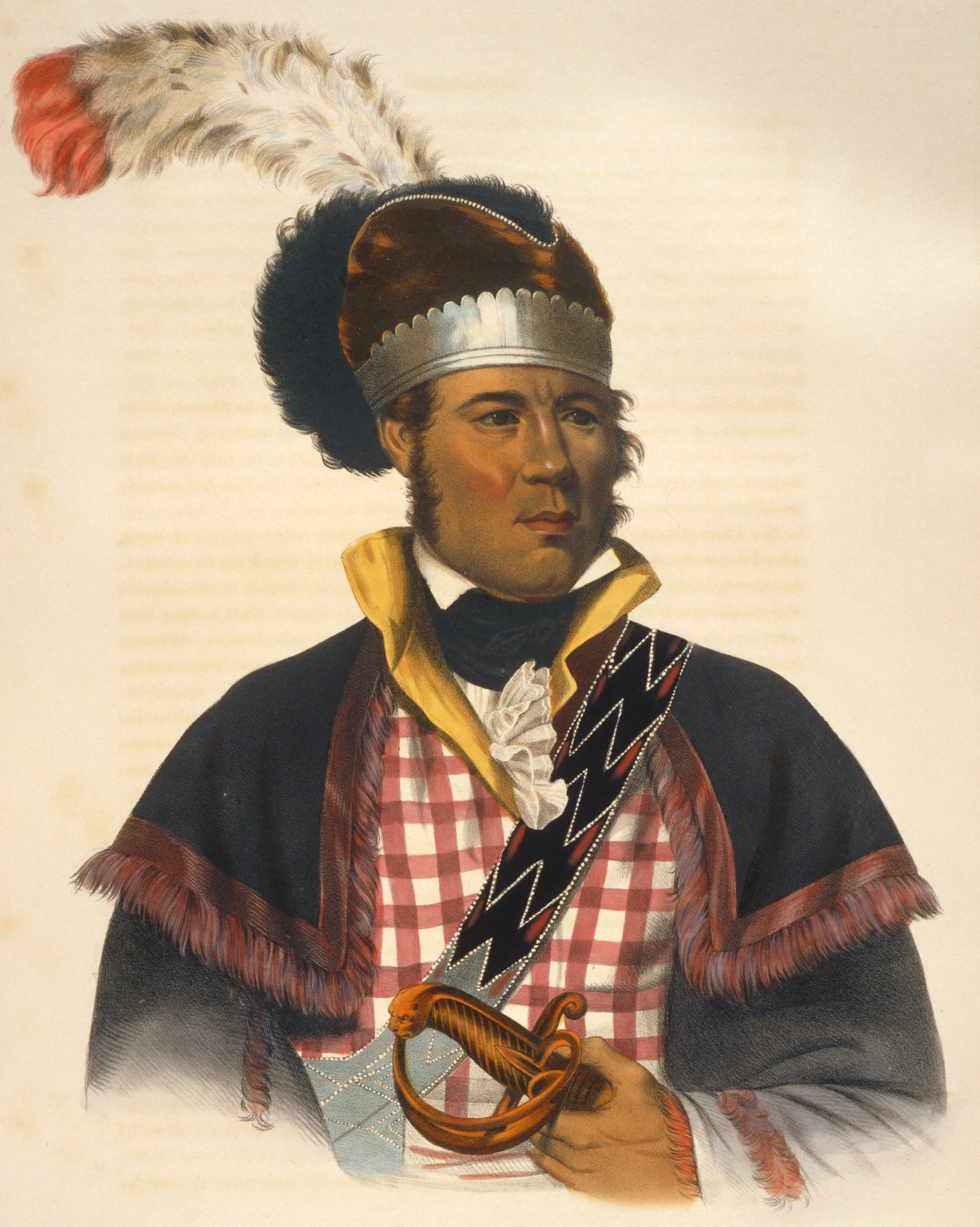
William McIntosh, whom the school is named after.

McIntosh High School (named after William McIntosh) was opened on January 18, 1981 to serve the growing community of Peachtree City. Before this, all county residents went to Fayette County High School.

At the time, the building was still under construction, though deemed sufficient to serve the truncated 2nd Semester of the 1981–1982 school year. The following year, the school was finally able to open a full school year on its campus.

More additions came a few years later during the 1985–1986 school semester. The math and science wing was added to the east side of campus. Some years later the Black Box theater was built next to the construction education classroom during the 1994–1995 school year.

The opening of Starr's Mill High School in 1997 helped alleviate the rapid population growth of Peachtree City. Shortly before the 2004–2005 school year the automotive education program was dropped and the black box theater was converted into the new band room. A new gym was constructed and the former converted into a new auditorium.

=== Awards ===
McIntosh was named a 2007 National Blue Ribbon School by the US Department of Education, having scored in the top 10% of all schools nationwide in student achievement.

The school placed on Georgia's 2007 Top 25 SAT List for having the 15th highest SAT score. It received Georgia's 2007 and 2011 Platinum Award in the highest performance category for outstanding student achievement; it was one of seven high schools in the state to receive this honor. It was named a Georgia School of Excellence in 1987, 2001, 2008, and 2012. It was recognized by the college board as an AP Merit, AP STEM, and AP STEM Achievement School. It received the Director's Cup Distinction for Athletics in 2013, and Director's Cup for Girls' Athletics in 2013 and 2014. It was recognized in Atlanta's 2012 list of 50 Best Public High Schools. It ranked 48th in the Washington Post list of America's Most Challenging High Schools, 2013. It has earned 44 state championships in athletics since 1981. It is accredited by the Southern Association of Colleges and Schools.

McIntosh was on the Newsweek 2007, 2008, 2009, and 2010 top 1300 US high schools lists, placing in the top 5% of all high schools nationwide.

== Student life ==
McIntosh had the highest SAT scores in Fayette County for 2005. In 2008, McIntosh's ACT scores were reported as the highest in Fayette County and the third highest in the state of Georgia. In 2008 and 2009, the McIntosh High School Varsity Academic Bowl team won the state championship.

As of September 2014, there are 21 AP courses offered, and over 150 students participate in Dual enrollment through the ACCEL Program.

Many McIntosh students aged 15 and older and holding a Georgia Learner's Permit opt to drive golf carts to school and park in the separate golf cart parking lot.

== Sports ==
McIntosh has athletic programs in soccer, football, volleyball, dance, and cross country.

=== Soccer ===
Girls' soccer won the state championship eleven times including 1994, beating their rival Fayette County in 1995 (with an overall record of 19–0), and in 2016, beating Columbus 4–0. Both the boys and girls soccer teams have won the state championship in the same season four times (1992, 2000, 2014, and 2017). The varsity boys' soccer team was named national champions in 2013 and 2014 and went unbeaten through those two seasons.

=== Tennis ===
The boys' tennis team won the state championship in 2025, finishing the season undefeated at 21-0 by beating Riverwood International 3-2. They have also been state runner-up twice, in 2008 and 2010, and has been division champions for four years. Girls' tennis won state champions in 2021, defeating Northview Highschool 3–2. Boys' soccer has won 2 national titles, 6 state championships, and been state runner-up six times.

=== Rivalries ===
McIntosh High School has athletic rivalries with several nearby schools. Its football rivalry with Fayette County High School is known as the "Fight for 54", named after Georgia Highway 54, which connects Peachtree City and Fayetteville.

McIntosh also competes against Starr's Mill High School. Their basketball matchup is known as the "Battle of the Bubble", while their soccer matchup is called the "Battle for the Troops".

The rivalry with Northgate High School is known as the "Line Creek Clash". Other local opponents include Whitewater High School and Sandy Creek High School.

== Notable alumni ==
- Julie Augustyniak – professional soccer player
- Nancy Augustyniak Goffi – professional soccer player
- Johanna Braddy – actress
- Tad Dennis – member of USA canoe/kayak national team
- Bilal Duckett – former defender for the Charlotte Independence in the United Soccer League
- Benn Fraker – U.S. canoeist at the 2008 Summer Olympics
- Shae Marks – model and actress
- Rakel Karvelsson – former soccer player for the University of North Carolina, Philadelphia Charge of the WUSA, and the Iceland national team
- Gabby Kessler – former professional soccer player for the Houston Dash in the NWSL
- Andrew Pinckney – MLB outfielder
- John Parker Romo – place kicker Atlanta Falcons
- Jeff Sheppard – former Kentucky Wildcats and Atlanta Hawks guard
- Dwight Smith Jr. – outfielder for the Chicago White Sox
- Garrett Smithley – NASCAR driver
- Travis Van Winkle – actor
- Rutledge Wood – television personality
