= Brooks, Georgia =

Town of Brooks, Georgia
- Town
- Location in Fayette County and the state of Georgia
- Coordinates: 33°17′46″N 84°27′32″W
- Country: United States
- State: Georgia
- County: Fayette

Area
  - Total: 4.35 sq mi (11.26 km^{2})
  - Land: 4.29 sq mi (11.11 km^{2})
  - Water: 0.058 sq mi (0.15 km^{2})
- Elevation: 837 ft (255 m)

Population (2020)
  - Total: 568
  - Density: 132.4/sq mi (51.12/km^{2})
- Time zone: UTC-5 (Eastern (EST))
  - Summer (DST): UTC-4 (EDT)
- ZIP code: 30205
- Area code: 770
- FIPS code: 13-11056
- GNIS feature ID: 0354866
- Website: www.brooksga.com

Brooks is a town in Fayette County, Georgia, United States. As of the 2020 United States census, it had a population of 568.

== History ==
Before white settlers came to the area, Creek Indians lived in the Brooks area. The first white settlers to reside in the area were the Haisten family. At first the town was called "Haistentown", but after several other names, Brooks became the name of the town in 1905, after a local planter, Hillery Brooks, who contributed greatly to the construction of the railroad and a much needed depot. During the Civil War, the town sent many young men to fight in the Confederate Army. Several of these men were killed during the war.

== Geography ==
Brooks is located in southern Fayette County, 13 miles (21 km) south of Fayetteville, the county seat, 12 miles (19 km) southeast of Peachtree City, and 13 miles (21 km) west of Griffin. Brooks is 35 miles (56 km) south of downtown Atlanta. According to the United States Census Bureau, Brooks has a total area of 4.4 square miles (11.3 km^{2}), of which 4.3 square miles (11.1 km^{2}) is land and 0.1 square miles (0.2 km^{2}), or 1.38%, is water.

== Demographics ==
Historical population
Census	Pop.	Note	%±
1920	256		—
1930	223		−12.9%
1940	134		−39.9%
1950	136		1.5%
1960	158		16.2%
1970	172		8.9%
1980	199		15.7%
1990	328		64.8%
2000	553		68.6%
2010	524		−5.2%
2020	568		8.4%
U.S. Decennial Census

In 2020, its population was 568.

In 2010, the median income for a household in the town was $65,000, and the median income for a family was $70,625. Males had a median income of $47,841 versus $22,000 for females. The per capita income for the town was $28,199. About 1.6% of families and 2.0% of the population were below the poverty line, including none of those under age 18 and 1.9% of those age 65 or over.

== Economy ==
By the 1900s Brooks began to grow due to the railroad. According to Daniel Langford Jr. several stores were built, including a bank, a drugstore, cotton gins, grist mills, and blacksmith shops. Although businesses were on the rise in the small town, the main source of economy for the town was farming.

Cotton was the number one crop for a long time until 1921 when the boll weevil appeared, quickly destroying crops, placing the town into an economic depression, and causing it to lose its charter. By the time the Great Depression struck the country, Brooks had been suffering for eight years. The town began to come out of the depression in 1939 after electricity was installed in the town. Around this time Brooks received its town charter again. Another factor in the growth of the town was due to the rise in the airline industry. Airline employees from Atlanta began to buy large tracts of farmland. Farming also changed as the focus switched from cotton to cattle.

== Education ==
Brooks' education falls under the Fayette County School System. Middle school students attend Whitewater Middle, and high school students attend Whitewater High School in Fayetteville, both of which are of recent construction. Liberty Tech Charter school is using the old Brooks Elementary School building; there has been a school at this location since 1909. Brooks Elementary closed in 2013.
