= National Register of Historic Places listings in Fayette County, Georgia =

Location of Fayette County in Georgia

This is a list of properties and districts in Fayette County, Georgia that are listed on the National Register of Historic Places (NRHP).

This National Park Service list is complete through NPS recent listings posted January 2, 2026.

== Current listings ==
	Name on the Register	Image	Date listed	Location	City or town	Description
1	Fayette County Courthouse	Fayette County Courthouse	September 18, 1980 (#80001020)	GA 85; 33°26′53″N 84°27′17″W	Fayetteville	
2	Reuben Gay House		July 5, 2022 (#100007866)	116 Weldon Rd. 33°23′48″N 84°24′39″W	Fayetteville vicinity	
3	Holliday-Dorsey-Fife House	Holliday-Dorsey-Fife House	April 10, 2008 (#08000263)	140 W. Lanier Ave. 33°26′54″N 84°27′22″W	Fayetteville	
4	Tandy King House		July 20, 1978 (#78000980)	Address Restricted	Fayetteville	Believed to be the oldest house in the county; adjacent is the King Family Cemetery in which War of 1812 veteran and judge Tandy King is buried. Noted to be south of Fayetteville on Georgia State Route 92 A column of McCook's cavalry passed by.
5	Railroad Street Historic District		January 7, 2026 (#100012528)	North Jeff Davis Drive and Georgia Avenue; 33°27′13″N 84°27′00″W	Fayetteville	
