= Sandy Creek High School =

Public high school in Tyrone, Georgia, United States

Location
- 360 Jenkins Road; Tyrone, Georgia 30290-1614; South America; 33°29′39″N 84°34′24″W

Information
- Type: Public high school
- Motto: "Providing Students with a competitive advantage "
- Established: 1880
- School district: Fayette County School District
- Principal: Tosha Oliver
- Teaching staff: 89.30 (FTE)
- Enrollment: 1,179 (2023–2024)
- Student to teacher ratio: 13.20
- Campus type: Suburban
- Colors: Red, white and navy
- Athletics conference: 5-AAAA in Georgia High School Association (GHSA)
- Mascot: Patriots
- Accreditations: Southern Association of Colleges and Schools
- Telephone: (770) 969–2840
- Fax: (770) 969–2838
- Website: https://schs.fcboe.org/

Sandy Creek High School (SCHS) is a public high school in Tyrone, Georgia, United States. It is part of the Fayette County School System.

Sandy Creek serves Tyrone, northern Fayetteville, and northern portions of Peachtree City. It opened in 1991 with approximately 400 students in order to relieve overcrowding at Fayette County High School and McIntosh High School.

During 2021, the school had 1,207 students enrolled in grades 9–12 and was accredited by the Southern Association of High Schools and Colleges.

== Sports ==
Sandy Creek has become known for its successful sports programs, with many alumni having received Division I athletic scholarships, and several playing professionally.

The school was 2000 cheerleading State Champion, 2004–2005 football Region Champions, 1997 & 2002 boys' basketball Elite 8, 2005 boys' basketball Semi-Finalist, 2002 & 2003 basketball Region Champions, and 2008–2009 6-AAAA Volleyball State & Region Champions. The school has won multiple track state championships.

Sandy Creek won its first football state title on December 11, 2009, and became back-to-back state champs on the same day one year later, defeating Carrollton in the AAA title.

=== Volleyball ===
- 2007–2008 State Runner-Up
- 2008–2009 State Champions
- 2008–2009 Region Champions
- 2010–2011 State Runner-Up
- 2011–2012 State Champions
- 2012–2013 State Champions

=== Football ===
The Sandy Creek Football team finished the 2010 season with a 29-game win streak. The streak ended at 41 straight games after a loss to the Gainesville Red Elephants in the 2011 quarterfinals.

==== Championships ====
- 2003 Region Champions
- 2004 Region Champions
- 2008 Region Champions
- 2009 Region Champions
- 2009 AAAA football State Champions (14–1)
- 2010 Region Champions
- 2010 AAA football State Champions (15–0)
- 2011 Region Champions
- 2012 Region Champions
- 2012 AAAA football State Champions (15–0)
- 2013 Region Champions
- 2022 AAA football State Champions (13–2)
- 2025 AAA football State Champions (15-0)

==== NFL alumni ====
These alumni have played in the National Football League:

- '97 SCHS grad – Jabari Holloway (New England Patriots/Houston Texans)
- '01 SCHS grad – JR Lemon (Oakland Raiders)
- '02 SCHS grad – Riley Swanson (Buffalo Bills)
- '02 SCHS grad – Kedric Golston (Washington Redskins)
- '04 SCHS grad – Calvin Johnson (Detroit Lions)
- '04 SCHS grad – Andrew Gardner (Miami Dolphins, Baltimore Ravens, Cincinnati Bengals, Houston Texans, Philadelphia Eagles)
- '10 SCHS grad – Isaiah Johnson (Detroit Lions)
- '10 SCHS grad – Rajion Neal (Green Bay Packers)
- ’12 SCHS grad - Mike Hilton (Cincinnati Bengals)
- '20 SCHS grad - Brian Branch (Detroit Lions)

==== AFL alumni ====
These alumni have played in the Arena Football League:

- '02 SCHS grad – Riley Swanson (Arizona Rattlers, Tampa Bay Storm)

==== SCHS football 10+ win seasons ====
- '03 season record: 10–1 (Region Champions and undefeated in Region 4-AAAA)
- '04 season record: 11–1 (Region Champions and undefeated in Region 4-AAAA)
- '08 season record: 11–1 (Region Champions and undefeated in Region Play)
- '09 season record: 14–1 (Region Champions and AAAA state champions)
- '10 season record: 15–0 (Region Champions and AAA state champions)
- '11 season record: 12–1 (Region Champions and undefeated in Region 4-AAA)
- '12 season record: 15–0 (Region Champions and AAAA State Champions)
- '13 season record: 11–1–1 (Region Champions and undefeated in Region 5-AAAA)
- '19 season record: 11–1
- '22 season record: 13–2 (AAA State Champions)

==== SCHS football history ====
Sandy Creek is the first Fayette County football team to win a Georgia state championship.

In 2003 and 2004, the Patriot football program boasted two perfect 10–0 regular season records and trips to the AAAA State Playoffs, including 24 straight regular season victories. They also had a perfect regular season in 2008.

Sandy Creek won back-to-back state titles in two different divisions. They won a AAAA state title in 2009 and a AAA title in 2010.

==== SCHS football coaching ====
Brett Garvin currently holds the head coaching position for the Sandy Creek Patriots football program.

Previous head coaches at SCHS include Rodney Walker and his son Chip Walker.

Sandy Creek had five straight regional championships in the 2008 through 2012 seasons.

Sandy Creek won the school's first state championship on December 11, 2009.

=== Basketball ===
The Sandy Creek basketball team made it to the Final Four in 2005 and 2018.

SCHS retired the jersey of #23 L.T. Lockett, class of 2001, one of the most prolific scorers in Georgia high school history. D-I basketball players include John Beckett (Georgia State University), L.T. Lockett (Middle TN State University), #34 Aaron B. Caruthers (University of North Florida), class of 2005.

In 2025, SCHS retired the jersey of #10 Jabari Smith Jr., class of 2021. He was the 3rd overall pick in the 2022 NBA Draft by the Houston Rockets. A consensus 5-star recruit, McDonald’s All American, USA basketball alum, and Gatorade Player of the year (Georgia). He is recognized as the best basketball player to graduate from Sandy Creek.

=== Baseball ===
Eric Thomas was selected by the Milwaukee Brewers in the 28 round of the 2002 MLB Draft. Brent Brewer was selected by the Milwaukee Brewers with the 60th pick of the 2006 MLB Draft. Blake Brewer was also selected in the 2008 MLB Draft by the Florida Marlins. D-I baseball players include Eric Thomas (2002) (Southern University), Jay Fields (Georgia State University), Rusty Bennett (2001-Georgia State University), Dusty Bennett (2004-Georgia State University). More recently, some more D-I commits include: Cole Jackson (2016-Georgia State University), Thomas Farr (2017-University of South Carolina), Markell Graham (2018-East Tennessee State University), and John Marant (2020-Georgia Institute of Technology).

Former Dodger Andrew Toles graduated from Sandy Creek in 2010. Toles was drafted by the Tampa Bay Rays in the 2012 draft in the third round after playing with the Tennessee Volunteers and Chipola College. While Toles only played 2 years with the Dodgers, he has remained on the club's restricted list so that he has access to the team's health insurance because of a variety of mental health complications.

=== Soccer ===
In the spring of 2007, for the first time in school history, the Sandy Creek boys' soccer team made the state playoffs. The team achieved a #4 seed in Region 6-AAA. The boys' team has made the state playoffs each of the last three years. In 2008 the team reached the second round of the playoffs for the first time in school history. They also reached the second round for the second time in school history in 2023.

=== Swimming ===
The Sandy Creek Swimming Patriots are a competitive swimming program, coached by Steve Henderson and assisted by Evans Martin.

=== Wrestling ===
Sandy Creek's wrestling team competes in a wide range of matches and tournaments throughout the season.

Derek Wojcik is the most prolific wrestler to graduate from Sandy Creek. He was a state champion in 2010 and 2009. Other notables include two-time placer Julian Holmes, who took fifth in 2008 and second in 2009, and Treijon Johnson, who took sixth in 2012 and fourth in 2013. Wojcik is Sandy Creek's only active college wrestler.

== Fine arts ==
The Sandy Creek fine arts department includes four choirs, and Orchestra, Band, Art, and Drama departments.

The Choral Department consistently receives superior ratings every year from The Georgia Music Educators Association (GMEA), and performs on a national level. The chorus includes four groups: Men's, Treble (Women), Honor Ensemble (Women), and the Advanced Mixed Chorus. In 2009, The GMEA invited the Men's Chorus to perform for the GMEA In-Service Conference in Savannah, Georgia; they were the only all-male high school chorus to perform. The following year, the Advanced Mix Chorus traveled to San Francisco to perform with world-renowned ensemble Chanticleer.

=== Fox 5 Glee contest ===
In fall 2009, six members of the Select Mixed Chorus entered and won a contest hosted by Fox5 News and B98.5fm for the premiere of the television series Glee. After performing live at the Fox News studio, they received an array of grand prizes as well as being declared "Georgia's Best Vocal Ensemble." The members of this group were Jesse Alexander (soloist), Tyler Green (tenor 1), Aaron Biemiller (tenor 2), Anthony Spezzano (baritone), Chad Sims (bass), and Paul Merrill (bass).

=== Spring musical ===
Every year other year, the fine arts put together a school musical. In 2010, Sandy Creek performed Les Misérables, and received a nomination for Best Musical at the Shuler Hensley Awards. The latest musical to be performed at the Patriot Hall would be Little Shop of Horrors.

=== Band ===
The Sandy Creek High School Wind Ensemble and symphonic band receive Superior ratings at the GMEA Large Group Performance Evaluation each year. The band has a total of four programs that include a jazz ensemble, wind ensemble, symphonic band, and concert band. The Sound of Sandy Creek Marching Band also consistently receives Superiors at local marching band competitions in the state and around the region.

== Awards ==
- 2004 Georgia School of Excellence
- 2006 & 2007 Bronze Winner of Achievement by the Governor and the Department of Education
- 2008 & 2009 Gold Award Winner of Achievement by the Governor and the Department of Education
- 2003 & 2008 Newsweek magazine's "Top 1500 High Schools in the United States"
- 1996 Georgia School of Excellence

== Notable alumni ==
- Brian Branch (2020), Professional football player for the Detroit Lions
- Andrew Gardner (2004), offensive lineman for Georgia Tech Yellow Jackets; drafted in the sixth round of the 2009 NFL draft by the Miami Dolphins; also played for the Houston Texans, Philadelphia Eagles, and the San Francisco 49ers
- Kedric Golston (2002), defensive lineman who played for the Georgia Bulldogs and he was drafted in the sixth round of the 2006 NFL draft by the Washington Redskins
- Mike Hilton (2012), professional football player for the Pittsburgh Steelers
- Jabari Holloway (1997), tight end for the Notre Dame Fighting Irish; drafted in the fourth round of the 2001 NFL draft by the New England Patriots but only played for the Houston Texans
- Calvin Johnson (2004), former wide receiver who played for the Georgia Tech Yellow Jackets; drafted in the first round of the 2007 NFL draft by the Detroit Lions; elected to the Pro Football Hall of Fame in 2021
- Edward Ahmed Mitchell (2005), National Deputy Director, Council on American-Islamic Relations;
- Rajion Neal (2010), running back for the Pittsburgh Steelers
- Rob Redding, syndicated talk show host (graduated from Sandy Creek in 1994's charter class)
- Myles Rice (2021), basketball player
- Jabari Smith Jr. (2021), basketball player, Houston Rockets
- Justin Sumpter (2014), Former professional football player for the Los Angeles Rams
- Andrew Toles (2010), outfielder for the Los Angeles Dodgers
- Christian Taylor, gold medalist in 2012 London Olympics, 4 times world champion, in triple jump.

== Filming location ==
The school's auditorium was used to film the beginning of the "You Will Be Found" sequence in Stephen Chbosky's 2021 film adaptation of the musical Dear Evan Hansen.
