= Ronnie Mabra =

American politician

Ronnie Mabra, Jr.

Member of the Georgia House of Representatives from the 63rd district
- In office January 14, 2013 – December 31, 2016
- Preceded by: Tyrone Brooks
- Succeeded by: Debra Bazemore

Personal details
- Born: Ronald Edwin Mabra, Jr.
- Party: Democratic
- Spouse: Dawn
- Education: Georgia Institute of Technology (BBA); University of Georgia (JD)
- Profession: Attorney
- Website: Campaign site

Ronald Edwin Mabra, Jr. is an American attorney and politician who served as a member of the Georgia House of Representatives from 2013 to 2016. Mabra played football for the Georgia Tech Yellow Jackets, where he was a member of the All-ACC Academic Honor Team. Mabra is also an attorney in private practice.

== Early life and education ==
Mabra is a native of Fayetteville, Georgia. He played varsity football at Fayette County High School and earned a Bachelor of Business Administration from the Georgia Institute of Technology, where he played for Georgia Tech Yellow Jackets.

In 2000, Ronnie Mabra opted to forgo the NFL Scouting Combine and instead attended the University of Georgia School of Law.

== Career ==
In addition to serving in the Georgia General Assembly, Mabra worked as a trial lawyer and founded Mabra Firm, LLC., a personal injury law firm in Midtown Atlanta. He is a member of the Georgia Trial Lawyers Association and the Fayette County Bar Association. In 2011, 2012, 2013, and 2014, Ronnie was selected by Georgia Super Lawyers magazine to appear on its Rising Stars list, which features outstanding young lawyers throughout the state. In 2013 and 2014, Mabra’s law firm was recognized as one of the fastest-growing businesses in the country, started by a University of Georgia graduate.

In 2012, Mabra was elected in Georgia's 63rd House of Representatives district. Mabra was sworn in as a member of the Georgia General Assembly on January 14, 2013. His term ended on December 31, 2016.

== Personal life ==
Ronnie is married to Dawn Brawley. Dawn, a health care professional, serves as chair of the Fayette County Democratic Committee.
