= Georgia State Route 138 =

State highway in Georgia, United States

State Route 138
- SR 138 highlighted in red

Route information
- Maintained by GDOT
- Length: 59.2 mi (95.3 km)

Major junctions
- West end: SR 92 in Fairburn
- US 29 / SR 14 in Fairburn; I-85 in Union City; SR 85 in Riverdale; US 19 / US 41 / SR 3 / SR 54 northwest of Jonesboro; I-75 in Stockbridge; I-675 near Stockbridge; US 23 / SR 42 in Stockbridge; I-20 / US 278 / SR 12 in Conyers; SR 10 Bus. in Monroe; US 78 / SR 10 in Monroe
- East end: Charlotte Rowell Boulevard in Monroe

Location
- Country: United States
- State: Georgia
- Counties: Fulton, Fayette, Clayton, Henry, Rockdale, Newton, Walton

Highway system
- Georgia State Highway System; Interstate; US; State; Special
← SR 137	→ SR 139

State Route 138 (SR 138) is a 59.2-mile (95.3 km) state highway in the northwestern part of the U.S. state of Georgia. The highway is a west-to-east route that travels within portions of Fulton, Fayette, Clayton, Henry, Rockdale, Newton, and Walton counties that connects Fairburn and Monroe, while bypassing Atlanta.

== Route description ==
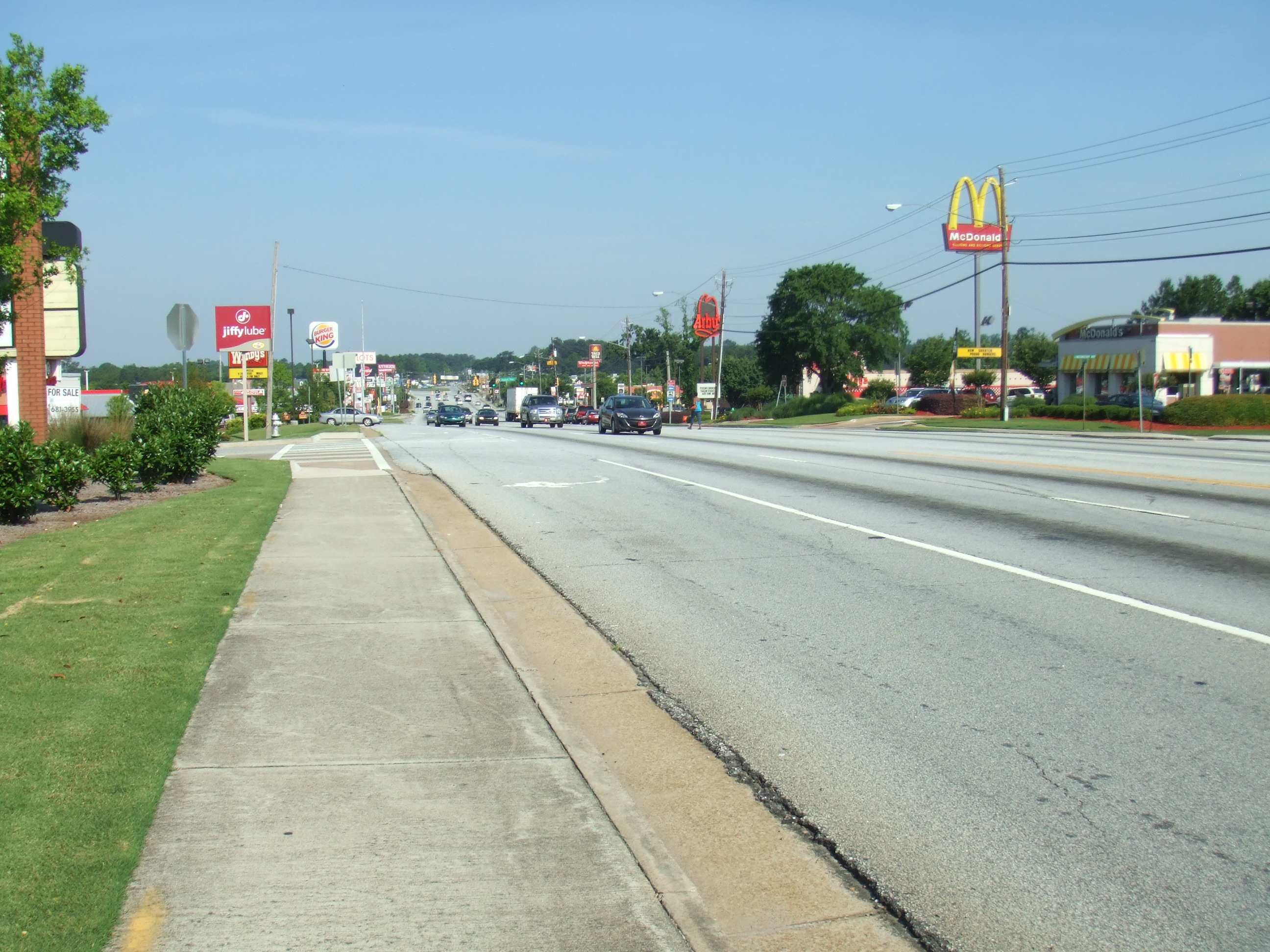
Westbound Route 138 as it runs through Union City.

SR 138 begins at an intersection with SR 92 (West Campbellton Street) in Fairburn, within Fulton County. In town, it heads southeast to US 29/SR 14 (Roosevelt Highway). It continues southeasterly to an interchange with Interstate 85 (I-85; James D. "Jim" McGee Memorial Highway) in Union City. Farther to the southeast is SR 279 (Old National Highway), just prior to reaching the tripoint that is the meeting point of Fulton, Fayette, and Clayton counties. It runs along the Fayette–Clayton county line for a short while. During that stretch, it intersects SR 314 (West Fayetteville Road). After entering Clayton County proper, it meets SR 85 in Riverdale. Northwest of Jonesboro is an intersection with SR 138 Spur (North Avenue), which is part of the former route of the SR 138 mainline through town. SR 138 now passes north of most of the town. Just to the northwest of SR 138 Spur is US 19/US 41/SR 3/SR 54 (Tara Boulevard). At this intersection, SR 54 runs concurrent to the east for about 1 mile (1.6 km). On the northeastern edge of town, SR 54 splits off to the northeast on Jonesboro Road, and SR 138 curves to the southeast to meet is second intersection with SR 138 Spur (Stockbridge Road/Lake Spivey Parkway). Just before crossing into Henry County, SR 138 enters Stockbridge. In town, it has an interchange with I-75. The road re-enters Clayton County and slips out of the city limits for about 1 mile (1.6 km). It has an interchange with I-675 (Terrell Starr Parkway), during that stretch. After re-entering both Henry County and Stockbridge's city limits, the road meets US 23/SR 42 (North Henry Boulevard). The three routes head concurrent to the east, until just outside the city. After the concurrency ends, SR 138 heads northeast to an intersection with SR 155 (Snapfinger Road), just before entering Rockdale County. The road crosses over the South River and intersects SR 212 (Scott Highway). In Conyers, SR 138 meets SR 20 (McDonough Highway). The two routes run concurrently to the north and northeast through town, with an interchange with I-20/US 278/SR 12 (Purple Heart Highway), until SR 20 heads northwest on Sigman Road NE and SR 138 continues to the northeast in the northeastern part of town. The highway crosses over the Yellow River and cuts across the northernmost corner of Newton County, before entering Walton County. Shortly after the county line is Walnut Grove, where SR 81 (Leone Avenue) runs through. SR 138 continues to the northeast and enters Monroe. In town, is an intersection with SR 10 Business (West Spring Street). It then meets at an interchange with US 78/SR 10. It then finally meets its eastern terminus a fifth of a mile north of the previous interchange. The roadway continues northeast for a mile as Charlotte Rowell Boulevard to Georgia State Route 11 in Monroe.

All of SR 138 from I-85 to I-20 is part of the National Highway System, a system of roadways important to the nation's economy, defense, and mobility.

== History ==
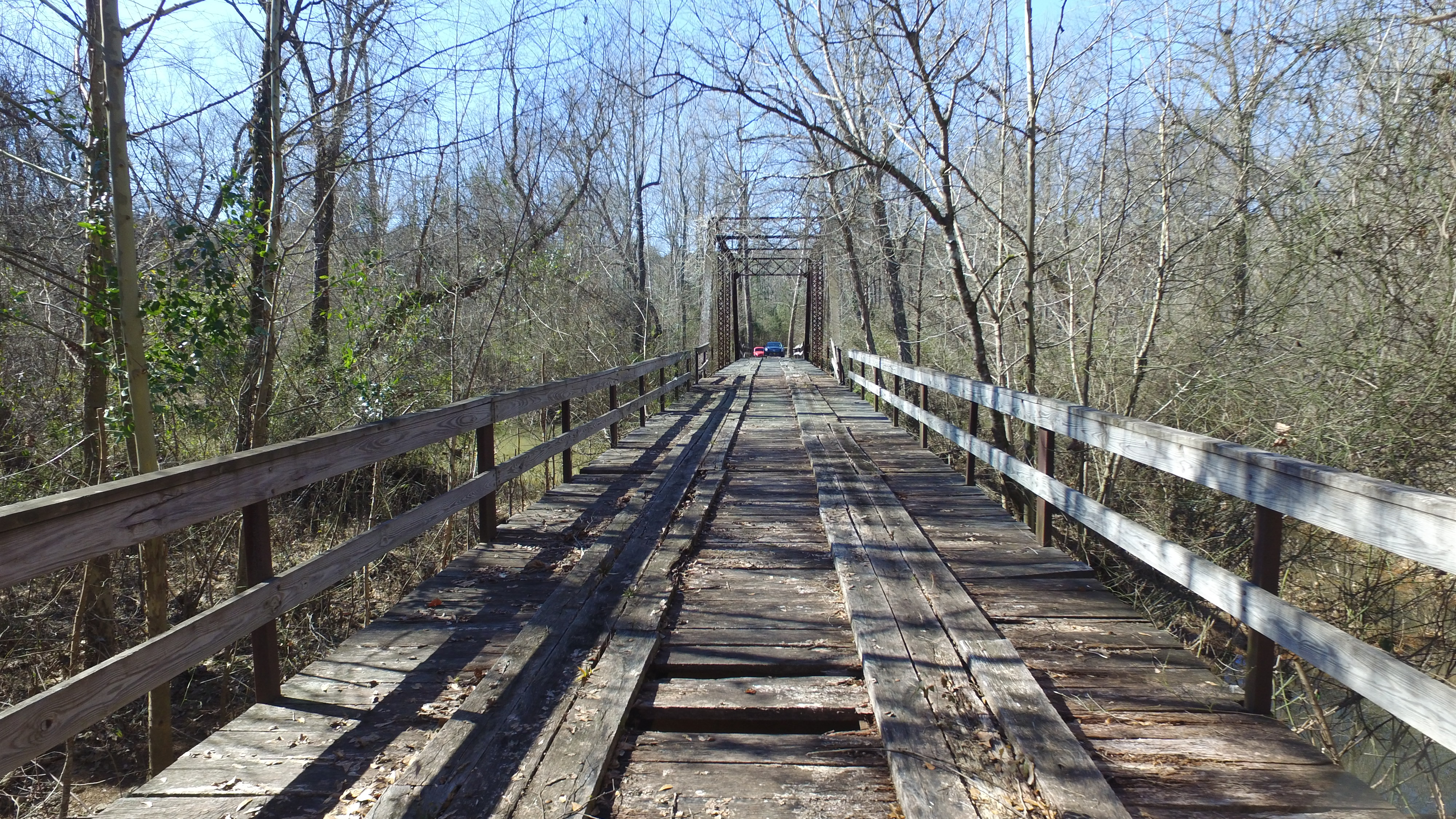
Former portion of SR 138 (view in 2016)

An old portion of SR 138 with a steel truss bridge crossing the Alcovy River in Walton County still exists on privately owned property.

== Major intersections ==
County	Location	mi	km	Destinations	Notes
Fulton	Fairburn	0.0	0.0	SR 92 (West Campbellton Street) – Fayetteville	Western terminus
Fulton	Fairburn	1.5	2.4	US 29 / SR 14 (Roosevelt Highway) – Palmetto, College Park	
Fulton	Union City	3.5	5.6	I-85 (James D. "Jim" McGee Memorial Highway / SR 403) – Montgomery, Atlanta	I-85 exit 64
Fulton		8.0	12.9	SR 279 (Old National Highway) – College Park	
Fayette–Clayton county line		9.0	14.5	SR 314 (West Fayetteville Road) – Fayetteville, College Park	
Clayton	Riverdale	10.9	17.5	SR 85 – Fayetteville, Forest Park	
Clayton		13.6	21.9	SR 138 Spur east (North Avenue) – Jonesboro	Western terminus of SR 138 Spur
Clayton		14.1	22.7	US 19 / US 41 / SR 3 / SR 54 west (Tara Boulevard) – Griffin, Fayetteville, Forest Park	Western end of SR 54 concurrency
Clayton	Jonesboro	14.9	24.0	SR 54 east (Jonesboro Road) – Morrow	Eastern end of SR 54 concurrency
Clayton		16.0	25.7	SR 138 Spur west (Stockbridge Road / Lake Spivey Parkway) – Jonesboro	Eastern terminus of SR 138 Spur
Henry	Stockbridge	19.8	31.9	I-75 (SR 401) – Macon, Atlanta	I-75 exit 228
Clayton		20.6	33.2	I-675 (Terrell Starr Parkway / SR 413)	I-675 exit 1
Henry	Stockbridge	21.2	34.1	US 23 north / SR 42 north (North Henry Boulevard) – Ellenwood	Western end of US 23/SR 42 concurrency
Henry		24.8	39.9	US 23 south / SR 42 south (North Henry Boulevard) – McDonough	Eastern end of US 23/SR 42 concurrency
Henry		29.5	47.5	SR 155 (Snapfinger Road) – McDonough, Decatur	
Rockdale		32.8	52.8	South River	
Rockdale		34.7	55.8	SR 212 (Scott Highway) – Snapfinger, Monticello	
Rockdale	Conyers	38.8	62.4	SR 20 south (McDonough Highway) – McDonough	Western end of SR 20 concurrency
Rockdale	Conyers	40.1	64.5	I-20 (SR 402) / US 278 / SR 12 (Purple Heart Highway) – Atlanta, Augusta	I-20 exit 82
Rockdale	Conyers	41.7	67.1	SR 20 north (Sigman Road NE) – Loganville	Eastern end of SR 20 concurrency
Rockdale		43.7	70.3	Yellow River	
Newton	No major junctions				
Walton	Walnut Grove	51.5	82.9	SR 81 (Leone Avenue) – Covington, Loganville	
Walton	Monroe	58.9	94.8	SR 10 Bus. (West Spring Street)	
Walton	Monroe	59.2	95.3	US 78 / SR 10 – Loganville, Athens	
Walton	Monroe	59.4	95.6	Charlotte Rowell Boulevard	Eastern (signed as northern) terminus; roadway continues northeast as Charlotte Rowell Boulevard to SR 11
1.000 mi = 1.609 km; 1.000 km = 0.621 mi: Concurrency terminus; Route transition

== Bannered route ==
State Route 138 Spur
- Location: Jonesboro, Georgia

State Route 138 Spur (SR 138 Spur) is a very short spur route, about 0.5 miles (0.80 km) in length, in Jonesboro that connects the SR 138 mainline with US 19/US 41/SR 3/SR 54 (Tara Boulevard). Until the early 1990s, it was part of SR 138 proper, which ran through downtown Jonesboro at the time. Around that time, a new bypass was built around the north side of the city. It initially received the designation SR 138 Spur; however, once the bypass was completed, the SR 138 and SR 138 Spur designations were swapped and the new SR 138 Spur truncated to Tara Boulevard on the west side of Jonesboro. Some street signs on the northern bypass, now the SR 138 mainline, still incorrectly refer to the road as "Spur 138".
