= Georgia State Route 279 =

State highway in Georgia, United States

State Route 279
- SR 279 highlighted in red

Route information
- Maintained by GDOT
- Length: 9.5 mi (15.3 km)

Major junctions
- South end: SR 85 northeast of Fayetteville
- SR 314 north of Fayetteville; SR 138 in southeastern Fulton County; I-285 in College Park
- North end: US 29 / SR 14 in College Park

Location
- Country: United States
- State: Georgia
- Counties: Fayette, Fulton

Highway system
- Georgia State Highway System; Interstate; US; State; Special
← SR 278	→ US 280

State Route 279 (SR 279) is a south–north state highway in the southwestern part of the Atlanta metropolitan area. Its routing is within northern Fayette and southern Fulton County.

== Route description ==
SR 279 begins at an intersection with SR 85 northeast of Fayetteville. Here, the roadway continues to the east as Carnegie Place. It heads west, and northwest, along Old National Highway to an intersection with SR 314 (W. Fayetteville Road). The route heads northwest until it intersects SR 138 (Jonesboro Road). SR 279 heads north into College Park to an interchange with Interstate 285 (I-285, a.k.a. Atlanta Bypass). It crosses a bridge over US 29/SR 14 (Roosevelt Highway) just north of this. The road curves to the east to Herschel Road, where it turns right to meet its northern terminus, an intersection with US 29/SR 14.

== Major intersections ==
County	Location	mi	km	Destinations	Notes
Fayette		0.0	0.0	SR 85 – Fayetteville, Riverdale	Southern terminus; roadway continues as Carnegie Place.
Fayette		2.0	3.2	SR 314 (West Fayetteville Road) – Fayetteville, College Park	
Fulton		3.9	6.3	SR 138 (Jonesboro Road) – Union City, Jonesboro	
Fulton	College Park	8.7	14.0	I-285 (Atlanta Bypass / SR 407) to I-85	I-285 south leads to I-85 north; I-285 north leads to I-85 south.
Fulton	College Park	9.5	15.3	US 29 / SR 14 (Roosevelt Highway) – Union City, Hartsfield–Jackson Atlanta International Airport	Northern terminus; US 29/SR 14 north lead to the College Park Downtown Business District.
1.000 mi = 1.609 km; 1.000 km = 0.621 mi

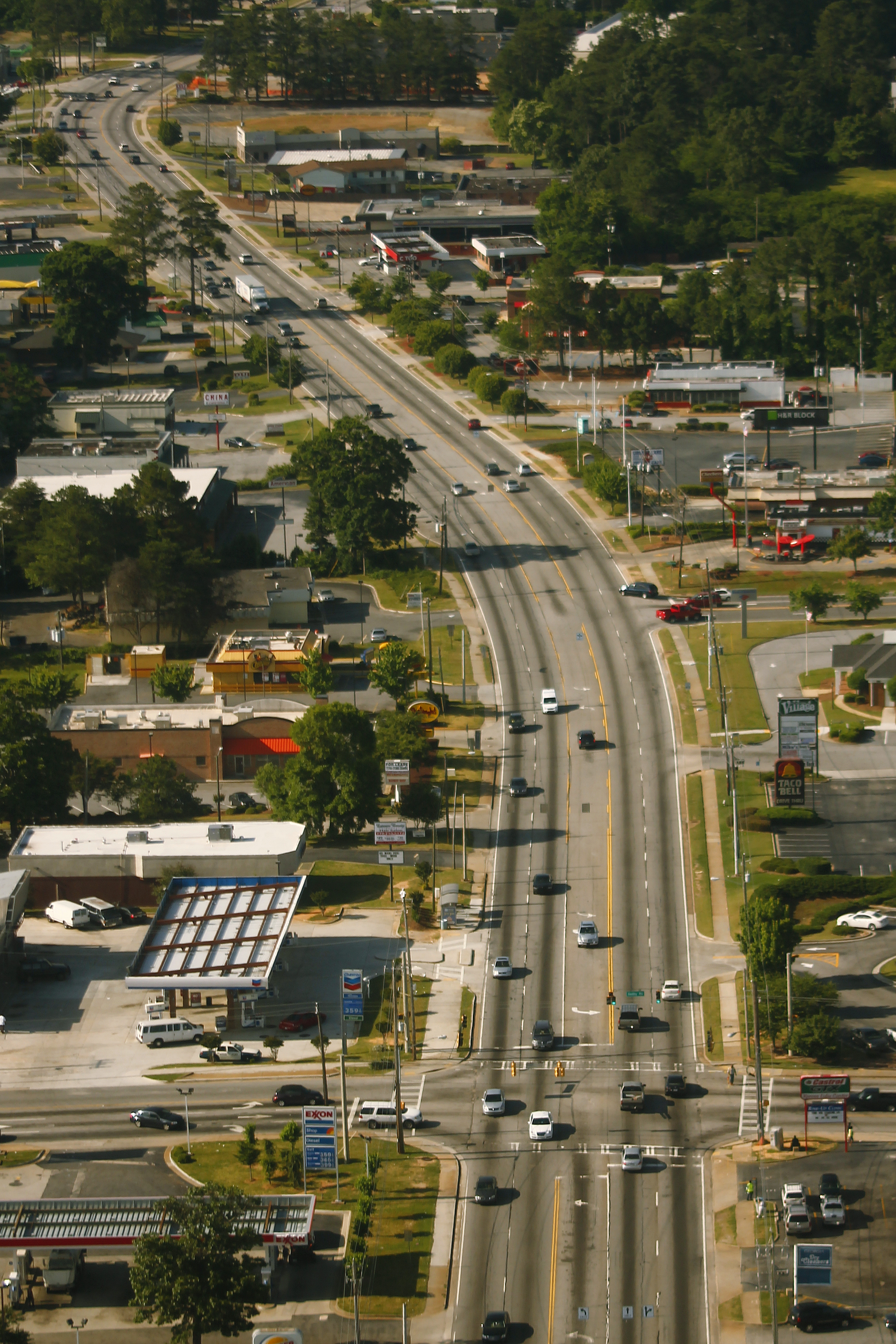
Aerial view of SR 279.
