= Georgia State Route 314 =

Highway in Georgia, United States

State Route 314
- West Fayetteville Road
- SR 314 highlighted in red

Route information
- Maintained by GDOT
- Length: 10.8 mi (17.4 km)

Major junctions
- South end: SR 85 in Fayetteville
- SR 279 north of Fayetteville; SR 138 southwest of Riverdale
- North end: SR 139 in College Park

Location
- Country: United States
- State: Georgia
- Counties: Fayette, Clayton

Highway system
- Georgia State Highway System; Interstate; US; State; Special
| ← SR 313 | → SR 315 |

State Route 314 (SR 314) is a 10.8-mile-long (17.4 km) state highway in the west-central part of the U.S. state of Georgia. It travels from SR 85 in Fayetteville to SR 139 in College Park, on the southwestern edge of the Hartsfield–Jackson Atlanta International Airport. It is known as West Fayetteville Road for its entire length.

== Route description ==
SR 314 begins at an intersection with SR 85 (Glynn Street N.) in Fayetteville. It travels nearly due north to an intersection with SR 279 (Evander Holyfield Highway), north of town. After passing Dickson Lake, it intersects SR 138 (Jonesboro Road), southwest of Riverdale. At this intersection, SR 314 enters Clayton County. The route continues to head nearly due north, and passes Oliver Elementary School. East of Flat Shoals Park, it crosses over Cater Creek. It passes North Clayton Middle School, and curves to the north-northwest, before curving back to the north-northeast. SR 314 passes underneath, but does not have an interchange with Interstate 285 (I-285). Immediately, it meets its northern terminus, an intersection with SR 139 (Riverdale Road) in College Park, on the southwestern edge of the Hartsfield–Jackson Atlanta International Airport.

== Major intersections ==
| County | Location | mi | km | Destinations | Notes |
|---|---|---|---|---|---|
| Fayette | Fayetteville | 0.0 | 0.0 | SR 85 (Glynn Street North) – Peachtree City, Riverdale | Southern terminus |
| Fayette | | 4.5 | 7.2 | SR 279 (Evander Holyfield Highway) to SR 85 – Union City | |
| Fayette–Clayton county line | | 6.0 | 9.7 | SR 138 (Jonesboro Road) – Union City, Jonesboro | |
| Clayton | College Park | 10.8 | 17.4 | SR 139 (Riverdale Road) to I-285 | Northern terminus |
1.000 mi = 1.609 km; 1.000 km = 0.621 mi
