= Isaiah Johnson (safety, born May 1992) =

American football player (born 1992)

No. 43, 27
- Position: Safety

Personal information
- Born: May 16, 1992 (age 34); Columbus, Ohio, U.S.
- Listed height: 6 ft 1 in (1.85 m)
- Listed weight: 210 lb (95 kg)

Career information
- High school: Sandy Creek (Tyrone, Georgia)
- College: Georgia Tech (2010–2014)
- NFL draft: 2015: undrafted

Career history
- Detroit Lions (2015); Los Angeles Rams (2016–2018); Indianapolis Colts (2019)

Career NFL statistics
- Total tackles: 9
- Stats at Pro Football Reference

Isaiah Nathan Johnson (born May 16, 1992) is an American former professional football player who was a safety in the National Football League (NFL). He played college football at Georgia Tech, and signed as an undrafted free agent with the Detroit Lions in 2015.

== Early life ==
Johnson attended and played high school football for Sandy Creek High School in Tyrone, Georgia. He earned all-state, all-region, and all-county honors as safety in 2009, when he helped lead Sandy Creek to the state championship. He was on the academic honor roll.

== College career ==
Attending Georgia Tech, Johnson started three games in his freshman year in 2010, and was a starter thereafter. He was injured at the end of his junior year, and sat out the following season. He played in 2014 as a redshirt senior. He finished his college career with 283 tackles, which were the most by any Georgia Tech defensive back.

== Professional career ==
Pre-draft measurables
Height	Weight	Arm length	Hand span	Wingspan	40-yard dash	10-yard split	20-yard split	20-yard shuttle	Three-cone drill	Vertical jump	Broad jump	Bench press
6 ft 1 in (1.85 m)	202 lb (92 kg)	32 3/8 in (0.82 m)	8 5/8 in (0.22 m)	6 ft 5 in (1.96 m)	4.59 s	1.53 s	2.59 s	4.13 s	6.98 s	34.0 in (0.86 m)	10 ft 4 in (3.15 m)	14 reps
All values from Pro Day

=== Detroit Lions ===
Johnson went undrafted in the 2015 NFL draft. He was signed by the Detroit Lions as an undrafted free agent before spring training for a $12,000 signing bonus. He was among the final cuts of spring training in 2015, but was signed off the practice squad on November 14 of that year.

On September 3, 2016, Johnson was waived by the Lions.

=== Los Angeles Rams ===
On September 6, 2016, Johnson was signed to the Los Angeles Rams' practice squad. He was promoted to the active roster on September 23, 2016. He was released on September 28, 2016 and re-signed to the practice squad. He was promoted back to the active roster on December 19, 2016.

On September 2, 2017, Johnson was waived by the Rams and was signed to the practice squad the next day. He was promoted to the active roster on November 3, 2017. He was waived by the Rams on November 7, 2017 and was re-signed to the practice squad. He was promoted back to the active roster on December 13, 2017.

On September 18, 2018, Johnson was waived by the Rams.

=== Indianapolis Colts ===
On January 14, 2019, Johnson signed a reserve/future contract with the Indianapolis Colts. He was waived on April 30, 2019, but was re-signed a few weeks later. He was waived/injured on August 31, 2019 and was placed on injured reserve.
