= Rajion Neal =

American gridiron football player (born 1992)

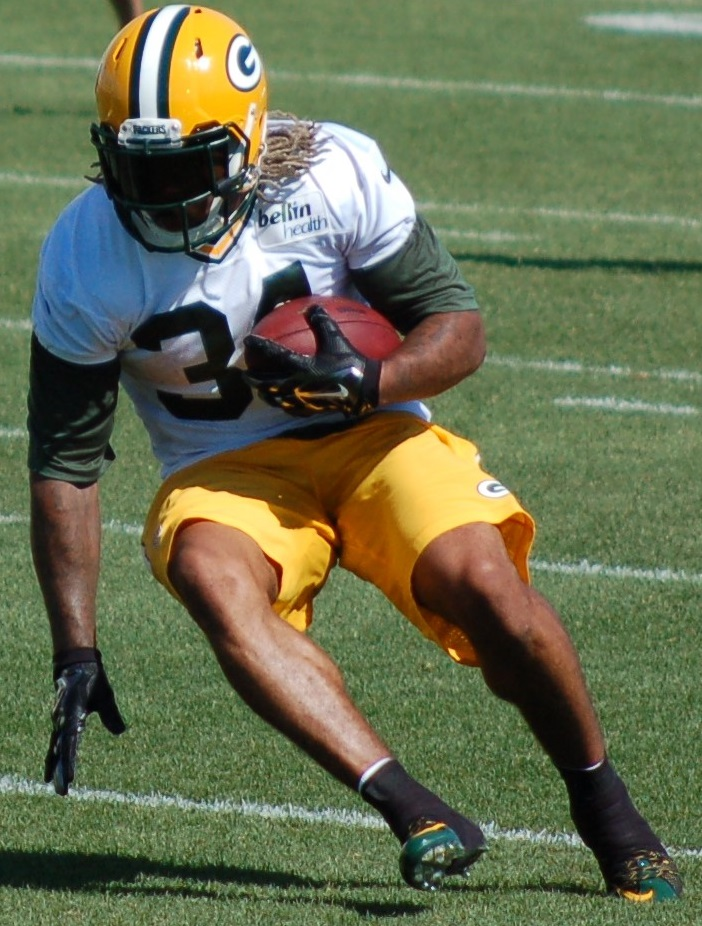
- Neal with the Green Bay Packers in 2015

No. 34, 43
- Position: Running back

Personal information
- Born: March 28, 1992 (age 34); Atlanta, Georgia, U.S.
- Listed height: 5 ft 11 in (1.80 m)
- Listed weight: 210 lb (95 kg)

Career information
- High school: Sandy Creek (Tyrone, Georgia)
- College: Tennessee
- NFL draft: 2014: undrafted

Career history
- Green Bay Packers (2014)*; Miami Dolphins (2015)*; Oakland Raiders (2015)*; Pittsburgh Steelers (2015)*; Cleveland Browns (2016); Hamilton Tiger-Cats (2017)*; Memphis Express (2019); Hamilton Tiger-Cats (2019)*
- * Offseason or practice squad member only
- Stats at Pro Football Reference

Rajion Lashad Neal (born March 28, 1992) is an American former football running back. He played college football at Tennessee. Neal was signed by the Green Bay Packers as an undrafted free agent in 2014, and has also been a member of the Miami Dolphins, Oakland Raiders, Pittsburgh Steelers, and Cleveland Browns of the National Football League (NFL). Neal was also a member of the Hamilton Tiger-Cats of the Canadian Football League (CFL), as well as the Memphis Express of the Alliance of American Football (AAF).

== Early life ==
Neal attended Sandy Creek High School in Tyrone, Georgia. He helped lead the Sandy Creek football team to Class AAAA state championship in 2009, after he ran for 166 yards and one touchdown over Clarke Central. As a senior, he rushed for 1,816 yards on 291 carries (6.24 avg) and 33 touchdowns, earning the Georgia Sportswriters Class AAAA State Offensive Player of the Year.

Considered a four-star recruit by Rivals.com, he was rated the ninth best running back prospect in the nation. He accepted a scholarship from Tennessee over offers from Mississippi State and Penn State.

== College career ==
In 2010, Neal played in 10 games as a freshman for Tennessee and rushed 46 times for 197 yards (4.3 avg) and caught seven passes for 100 yards. In 2011, he played wide receiver and running back for the Volunteers, and recorded 13 catches for 269 yards and carried 27 times for 134 yards (5.0) with three touchdowns. As a junior, he appeared in 10 games for the season, missing two due to an ankle injury. He was the leading rusher on team with 708 yards on 156 carries (4.5 avg) and finished with nine total touchdowns on the season (five rushing, four receiving). He also caught 19 passes for 149 yards. As a senior in 2013, Neal rushed for a career-high 1,124 yards on 215 carries (5.2 avg) and scored a career-high 15 rushing touchdowns, and hauled in 27 passes for 108 yards.

== Professional career ==
=== Green Bay Packers ===
After going undrafted in the 2014 NFL draft, Neal signed with the Green Bay Packers on May 12, 2014. On August 26, 2014, he was placed on injured reserve by the Packers. On November 3, 2014, he was signed to the Packers' practice squad. On August 30, 2015, he was released by the Packers with an injury settlement. On September 5, 2015, Neal was cut by the Packers.

=== Miami Dolphins ===
On September 7, 2015, Neal was signed to the Miami Dolphins' practice squad. On September 9, 2015, he was released by the Dolphins.

=== Oakland Raiders ===
On September 22, 2015, the Oakland Raiders signed Neal to their practice squad. On November 17, 2015, he was released by the Raiders.

=== Pittsburgh Steelers ===
On December 1, 2015, he was signed to the Pittsburgh Steelers' practice squad. On January 18, 2016, the Steelers signed Neal to a future/reserve contract. He was later released by the team.

=== Cleveland Browns ===
On August 4, 2016, Neal was signed by the Cleveland Browns. He was later released by the team.

=== Hamilton Tiger-Cats ===
In December 2017, Neal signed with the Hamilton Tiger-Cats of the Canadian Football League for the 2018 season, but was released in February 2018, prior to training camp.

=== Memphis Express ===
On September 27, 2018, Neal signed with the Memphis Express of the Alliance of American Football for the 2019 season. He was waived on February 21, 2019. During two games played, Neal had 8 rushes for 15 yards, and 4 catches for 10 yards.

=== Hamilton Tiger-Cats (II) ===
Following his release from the AAF, Neal signed again with Hamilton for the 2019 CFL season, but again was released by Hamilton prior to training camp.
