= Georgia's 69th House of Representatives district =

State district in Georgia, USA

Georgia's 69th State House of Representatives district
Representative
Debra Bazemore; D–South Fulton
- Demographics: 78.8% White; 14.8% Black; 2.6% Hispanic; 1.0% Asian
- Population: 54,231

District 69 elects one member of the Georgia House of Representatives.

== Geography ==
- Until 2023: parts of Carroll County, Heard County and Troup County
- Since 2023: parts of Fayette County and Fulton County.

== Members ==
- Randy Nix (2007–2023)
- Debra Bazemore (since 2023)
