= Jabari Holloway =

American football player (born 1978)

No. 89
- Position: Tight end

Personal information
- Born: December 18, 1978 (age 47); Atlanta, Georgia, U.S.
- Listed height: 6 ft 2 in (1.88 m)
- Listed weight: 260 lb (118 kg)

Career information
- High school: Sandy Creek (Tyrone, Georgia)
- College: Notre Dame
- NFL draft: 2001: 4th round, 119th overall pick

Career history
- New England Patriots (2001); Houston Texans (2002–2003); Washington Redskins (2005)*
- * Offseason or practice squad member only

Awards and highlights
- Super Bowl champion (XXXVI)

Career NFL statistics
- Receptions: 15
- Receiving yards: 157
- Stats at Pro Football Reference

Jabari Jelani Holloway (born December 18, 1978) is an American former professional football player who was a tight end in the National Football League (NFL) for the New England Patriots and Houston Texans. He was selected by the Patriots in the fourth round of the 2001 NFL draft after playing college football for the Notre Dame Fighting Irish. He won Super Bowl XXXVI with the Patriots. He started 17 of 26 games over his two-year career and finished with 15 receptions for 157 yards. He signed with the Washington Redskins before the 2005 season but was quickly released.
