= Fayette County High School =

Fayette County High School may refer to:

- Fayette County High School (Alabama), Fayette, Alabama
- Fayette County High School (Georgia), Fayetteville, Georgia
