= Inman, Georgia =

Unincorporated community in Georgia, U.S.

Coordinates: 33°23′07″N 84°24′43″W

Inman is an unincorporated community in Fayette County, in the U.S. state of Georgia.

== History ==
A post office called Inman was established in 1887, and remained in operation until 1967. Inman was incorporated as a town in 1911; the town's municipal charter was dissolved at a later date.
