= Tandy King House =

- U.S. National Register of Historic Places
- Nearest city: Fayetteville, Georgia
- Area: 3 acres (1.2 ha)
- Built: 1824
- Architectural style: Plain style
- NRHP reference No.: 78000980
- Added to NRHP: July 20, 1978

The Tandy King House, in the vicinity of Fayetteville in Fayette County, Georgia, was built in 1824. It was listed on the National Register of Historic Places in 1978. The listing included one contributing buildings and two contributing sites.

It is believed to be the oldest house in the county. Adjacent is the King Family Cemetery in which War of 1812 veteran and judge Tandy King is buried. Noted to be south of Fayetteville on Georgia State Route 92 During the American Civil War a column of McCook's cavalry passed by.
