= Tad Dennis =

Tad Dennis, born Timothy Alan Dennis, is a world-class athlete in the men's single slalom canoe division and a current member of the USA Canoe/Kayak National Team. Tad was born on May 28, 1984, in Riverdale, Georgia. He grew up in Peachtree City, Georgia and attended McIntosh High School, graduating in 2002.

Tad began kayaking at age 7 and began competing in the sport of whitewater slalom at age 11. From ages 11 to 13 Tad was on the US National Team for the Cadet age group, competing in the solo kayak (K1 men's) division. Tad then switched to the men's single canoe (C1 men's) division at age 14 and was a member of the US National Team for the Junior age group until he was 17. In 2001, Tad placed fourth at the Junior World Cup race in Prague, Czech Republic.

Due to injury, Tad took a four-year-long hiatus from kayaking and started again in the summer of 2006. That August, Tad placed 8th at the US National Championships in Charlotte, North Carolina. The following spring, Tad placed 3rd at the 2007 USA Canoe/Kayak National Team Trials, earning him the third and last place on the US National Team in the men's C1 division. In spring of 2008, Tad placed 3rd at the US Olympic Team Trials at the U.S. National Whitewater Center earning him yet again the last spot on the US National Team. His teammate Benn Fraker was selected to represent the United States in the 2008 Summer Olympics.

In addition to kayaking, Tad works as an air traffic controller at Charlotte-Douglas International Airport.

== Race results ==
2006 races	2007 races	2008 races
8th- US National Championship	3rd- Pan-American Championship, Brazil	3rd- NOC Glacier Breaker
	3rd- US Team Trials	3rd- US Olympic Team Trials
	19th- Beijing Olympic Test Event	17th- World Cup, Prague
