= Debra Bazemore =

American politician

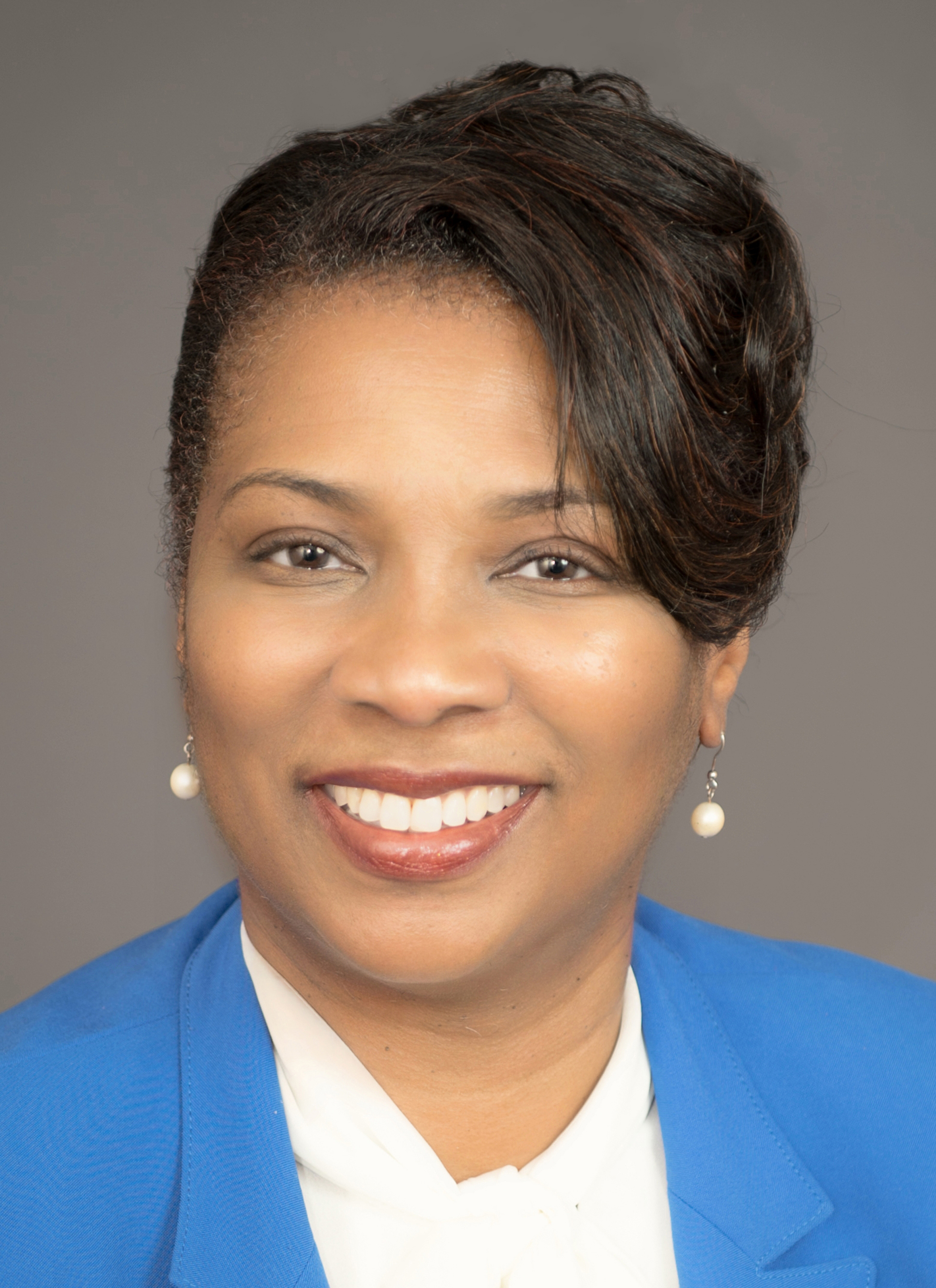

Member of the Georgia House of Representatives
- Incumbent
- Assumed office January 9, 2017
- Preceded by: Ronnie Mabra
- Constituency: 63rd District (2017–2023); 69th District (2023–Present)

Personal details
- Born: December 30, 1957 (age 68) Liberty, New York, U.S.
- Party: Democratic
- Education: Strayer University (BBA)

Debra L. Jones Bazemore (born December 30, 1957) is an American politician serving as a member of the Georgia House of Representatives from the 69th district. Elected in 2016, she assumed office on January 9, 2017.

== Early life and education ==
Bazemore was born in Liberty, New York, and earned a Bachelor of Business Administration from Strayer University in Washington, D.C.

== Career ==
A resident of South Fulton, Georgia, Bazemore was the chair and vice chair of South Fulton United, a non-profit organization that advocated for the incorporation of South Fulton. Bazemore later founded Concerned Parents and was the president of Old National Area Residents United. In the 2016 election for the 63rd district of the Georgia House of Representatives, Bazemore defeated Linda Pritchett in the Democratic primary and ran unopposed in the November general election. On November 10, 2020, Bazemore was elected House Minority Chief Deputy Whip by members of the Georgia House Democratic Caucus.

Georgia House of Representatives
| Preceded by Ronnie Mabra | Member of the Georgia House of Representatives from the 63rd district 2017–2023 | Succeeded by Kim Schofield |
| Preceded by Randy Nix | Member of the Georgia House of Representatives from the 69th district 2023–Present | Incumbent |
