= Andrew Gardner (American football) =

American football player (born 1986)

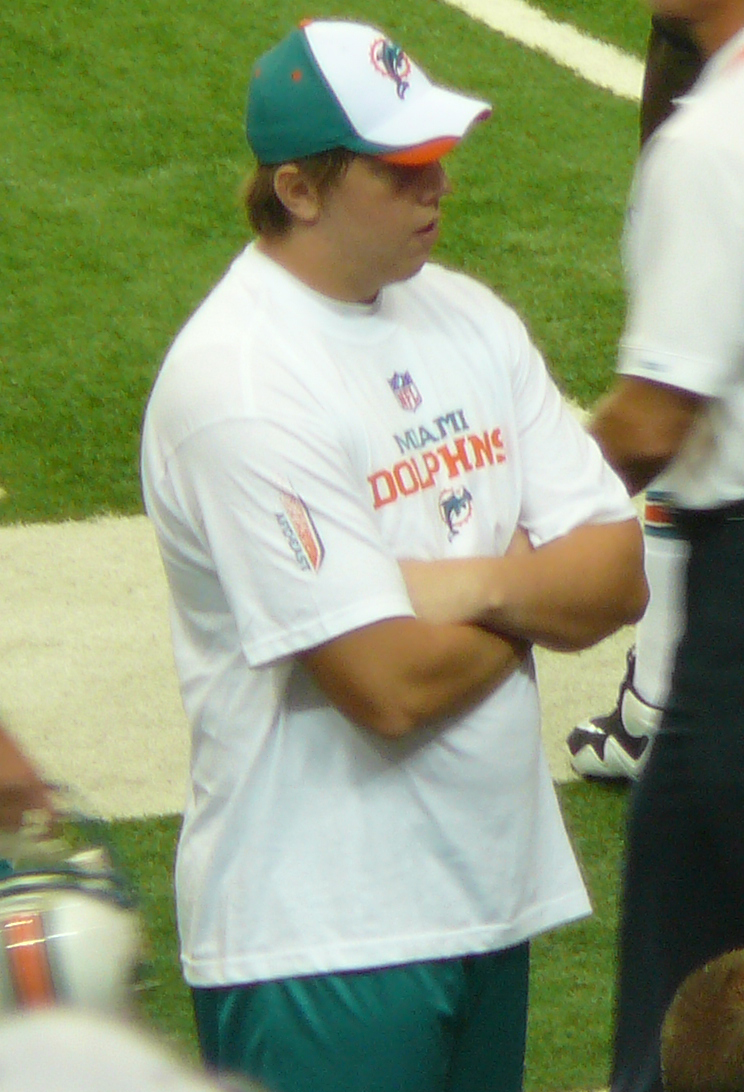
- Gardner with the Miami Dolphins in 2009

No. 62, 63, 66
- Position: Offensive guard

Personal information
- Born: April 4, 1986 (age 40); Chamblee, Georgia, U.S.
- Listed height: 6 ft 7 in (2.01 m)
- Listed weight: 304 lb (138 kg)

Career information
- High school: Sandy Creek (Tyrone, Georgia)
- College: Georgia Tech
- NFL draft: 2009: 6th round, 181st overall pick

Career history
- Miami Dolphins (2009); Baltimore Ravens (2010)*; Minnesota Vikings (2010)*; Cincinnati Bengals (2010–2011)*; Houston Texans (2011–2013); Philadelphia Eagles (2014–2016); San Francisco 49ers (2016)
- * Offseason or practice squad member only

Awards and highlights
- 2× First-team All-ACC (2007, 2008)

Career NFL statistics
- Games played: 28
- Games started: 12
- Stats at Pro Football Reference

Andrew James Gardner (born April 4, 1986) is an American former professional football player who was an offensive guard in the National Football League (NFL). He played college football for the Georgia Tech Yellow Jackets and was selected by the Miami Dolphins in the sixth round of the 2009 NFL draft. He was also a member of the Baltimore Ravens, Cincinnati Bengals, Houston Texans, Philadelphia Eagles, and San Francisco 49ers.

== Early life ==
A native of Tyrone, Georgia, Gardner attended Sandy Creek High School, where he was teammates with Calvin Johnson. Regarded as a two-star recruit by Rivals.com, Gardner was not listed among the top offensive tackle prospects of his class.

== College career ==
Gardner was an outstanding offensive lineman that started 48 consecutive games for the Yellow Jackets as a left tackle, he also helped future NFL running back Tashard Choice lead the ACC in rushing in both 2006 and 2007. His streak of 48 consecutive starts (every game of his career) was the nation's longest streak in consecutive starts until Gardner underwent season-ending surgery to repair his left shoulder during the 2008 season.

== Professional career ==
=== Miami Dolphins ===
Due to his surgery and subsequent inability to perform many of the combine and pro-day workouts, his stock dropped and he fell to the sixth round where he was selected by the Miami Dolphins (181st overall) in the sixth round of the 2009 NFL draft.

=== Baltimore Ravens ===
After being cut by the Dolphins, Gardner was signed to the Baltimore Ravens practice squad.

=== Cincinnati Bengals ===
After being cut by the Ravens, Gardner was signed to the Cincinnati Bengals practice squad. He was waived on August 23, 2011.

=== Houston Texans ===
Gardner signed with the Houston Texans on August 29, 2011.

=== Philadelphia Eagles ===
Gardner signed with the Philadelphia Eagles on March 31, 2014. On August 28, 2016, Gardner was waived by the Eagles.

=== San Francisco 49ers ===
On December 21, 2016, Gardner was signed by the 49ers. He was re-signed on August 14, 2017. He was released on September 1, 2017.

== Personal life ==
Gardner's wife’s name is Jennifer, and his parents are Jim and Christine Gardner.
