= Randy Nix =

American politician

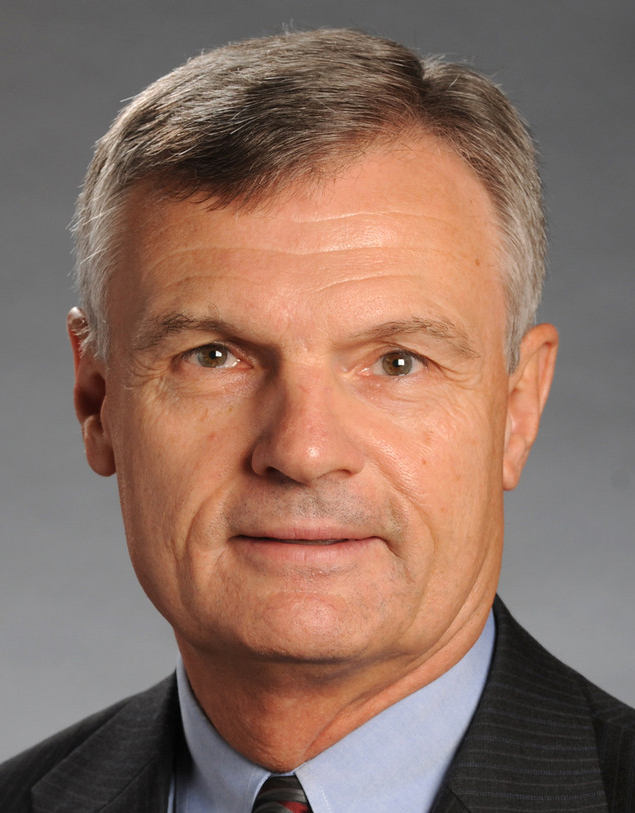

Member of the Georgia House of Representatives from the 69th district
- In office January 8, 2007 – January 9, 2023
- Succeeded by: David Huddleston (redistricting)

Personal details
- Born: Randall Otis Nix; June 19, 1952 (age 74)
- Party: Republican
- Spouse: Debra Nix
- Children: 2 Adult Children
- Occupation: Financial Services and Pastor

Randall Otis Nix (born June 19, 1952) is a former Republican member of the Georgia House of Representatives for the 69th district. This district encompassed parts of Carroll County, Heard County, and Troup County.

== Biography ==
Randy Nix was born on June 19, 1956. He graduated from Troy State University with a B.S. degree in Business, and later from the Southern Trust School as well. Randy and his wife, Debra, have two daughters: Jess (an attorney in Birmingham, Alabama) and Julie (a Marine reservist and nursing student).

Nix served 5 years as a chaplain's assistant in the U.S. Army Reserve. He later served 7 years in the Alabama Air National Guard. Nix is a pastor at the Hillcrest United Methodist Church in LaGrange. Nix also acts as a motivational speaker.

As a member of the Georgia House, Nix belongs to the following committees: Banks and Banking, Education, Economic Development and Tourism, Judiciary, and Natural Resources and Environment (Secretary).

In 2021, Nix proposed legislation that would strip power from bipartisan local election boards in Georgia and hand it over to a board composed primarily of Republicans.

Georgia House of Representatives
Preceded by	Member of the Georgia House of Representatives from the 69th district 2007–2023	Succeeded by Debra Bazemore
