= Andrew Pinckney =

American baseball player (born 2000)

Washington Nationals – No. 45
- Outfielder
- Born: December 7, 2000 (age 25); Tuscaloosa, Alabama, U.S.
- Bats: Right Throws: Right

MLB debut
- August 5, 2026, for the Washington Nationals

MLB statistics (through 2026 season)
- Batting average: .280
- Home runs: 1
- Runs batted in: 3
- Stats at Baseball Reference

Teams
- Washington Nationals (2026–present)

Andrew David Pinckney (born December 7, 2000) is an American professional baseball outfielder for the Washington Nationals of Major League Baseball (MLB). He debuted in MLB in 2026.

== Early life ==
Pinckney attended McIntosh High School in Peachtree City, Georgia, and the University of Alabama, where he played college baseball for the Alabama Crimson Tide. In 2021, he played collegiate summer baseball for the St. Cloud Rox of the Northwoods League. In 2022, he played for the Falmouth Commodores of the Cape Cod Baseball League and was named a league all-star.

== Professional career ==
Pinckney was selected by the Washington Nationals in the fourth round of the 2023 Major League Baseball draft. Pinckney signed with the Nationals and spent his first professional season with the Florida Complex League Nationals, Fredericksburg Nationals, Wilmington Blue Rocks and Harrisburg Senators.

The Nationals selected Pinckney to the roster and promoted him August 4, 2026, after an injury to starting right fielder James Wood. He made his MLB debut the next day at Citizens Bank Park, entering as a pinch-runner and scoring a run in the 10th inning. The following day, Pinckney got his first start and hit a 402–foot solo home run off of Cristopher Sánchez of the Philadelphia Phillies, making him the seventh player in Nationals history to hit a home run as his first career hit.
