= Georgia's 63rd House of Representatives district =

State district in Georgia, USA

Georgia's 63rd State House of Representatives district
Representative
Kim Schofield; D–Atlanta
- Demographics: 23.6% White; 65.0% Black; 4.7% Hispanic; 2.7% Asian
- Population: 54,026

District 63 elects one member of the Georgia House of Representatives. It contains parts of Fulton County.

== Members ==
- Tyrone Brooks (2005–2013)
- Ronnie Mabra (2013–2016)
- Debra Bazemore (2017–2023)
- Kim Schofield (since 2023)
