= Kim Schofield =

American politician and activist (born c.1962)

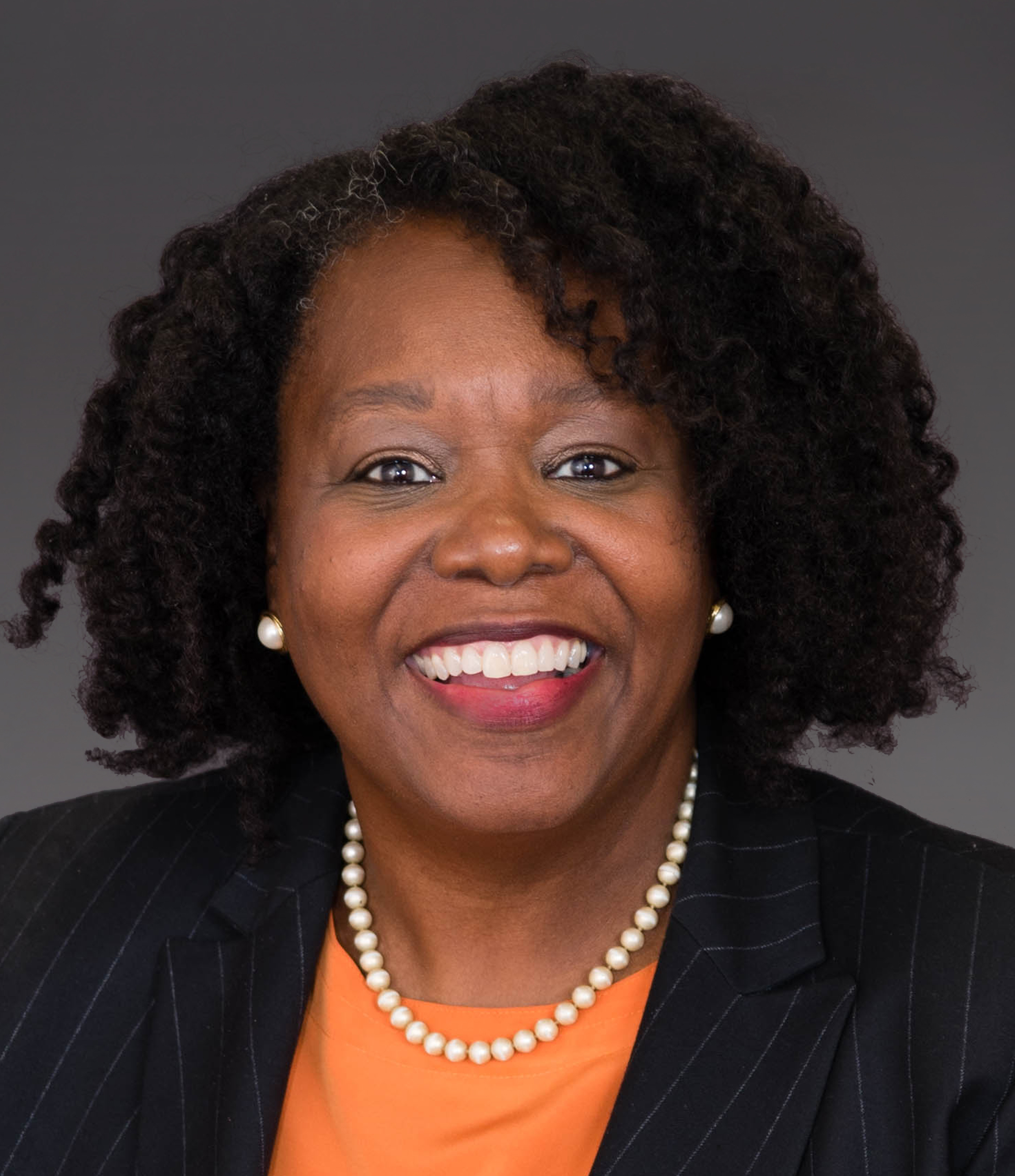
- Schofield in 2017

Member of the Georgia House of Representatives
- Incumbent
- Assumed office December 15, 2017
- Preceded by: Keisha Waites
- Constituency: 60th District (2017–2023); 63rd District (2023–present)

Personal details
- Born: c. 1962 (age 63–64)
- Party: Democratic
- Occupation: Politician, activist
- Website: staterepkim.com

Kim Joy Schofield (born c. 1962) is an American politician and public health activist. A Democrat, she has been a member of the Georgia House of Representatives since 2017. As an activist, she has raised awareness for lupus.

== Biography ==
Schofield was born c. 1962. She holds a bachelor's and master's degree in theology and leadership studies, and in 2020, earned a doctorate from Oral Roberts University. She lives in Atlanta and owns a small personal development strategist business. For a time, she was also a researcher for the Emory University School of Medicine.

Governor Nathan Deal appointed her as chair of the Georgia Council on Lupus Education and Awareness. She herself was diagnosed with the disease in 2000. For her lupus activism, the Lupus Foundation of America recognized her as a champion for those with it. President Barack Obama appointed her a member of the Health IT Policy Committee. She also writes articles and makes television appearances to discuss health policy.

A Democrat, Schofield has served in the Georgia House of Representatives since December 15, 2017. She is a member of the Creative Arts & Entertainment, Health & Human Services, Interstate Cooperation, and Small Business Development Committees; she is the secretary of the Urban Affairs Committee. She primarily sponsors bills regarding health policy and labor law legislation.

Schofield serves as the chair of the Georgia Council of Lupus Education and Awareness and is a member of the Atlanta Commission on Women.

Schofield has a daughter, Kyler Schofield, a film director.

Georgia House of Representatives
Preceded by Keisha Waites	Member of the Georgia House of Representatives from the 60th district 2017–2023	Succeeded by Sheila Jones
Preceded by Debra Bazemore	Member of the Georgia House of Representatives from the 63rd district 2023–Present	Incumbent
