= Fayette County, Georgia =

County in Georgia, United States

- County
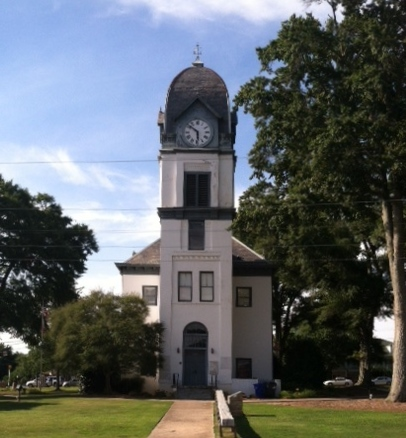
- Fayette County Courthouse, in Fayetteville

- Seal Logo

- Location within the U.S. state of Georgia
- Coordinates: 33°25′N 84°29′W
- Country: United States
- State: Georgia
- Founded: May 15, 1821; 205 years ago
- Named for: Marquis de Lafayette
- Seat: Fayetteville
- Largest city: Peachtree City

Area
  - Total: 199 sq mi (520 km^{2})
  - Land: 194 sq mi (500 km^{2})
  - Water: 5.0 sq mi (13 km^{2}) 8%

Population (2020)
  - Total: 119,194
  - Estimate (2025): 125,156 ▲
  - Density: 614/sq mi (237/km^{2})
- Time zone: UTC−5 (Eastern)
  - Summer (DST): UTC−4 (EDT)
- Congressional districts: 3rd, 13th
- Website: fayettecountyga.gov

Fayette County (/ˈfeɪ.ət/ FAY-ət) is a county located in the north central portion of the U.S. state of Georgia. As of the 2020 census, the population was 119,194, an increase from 106,567 in 2010. Fayette County was established in 1821. The county seat, Fayetteville, was established in 1823. Much of Fayette County is bordered on the east side by the Flint River.

Fayette County was organized in 1821 after the United States signed a treaty at Indian Springs, Georgia with the Creek people for cession of a large portion of their land. The county and its seat, Fayetteville, were both named in honor of the French aristocrat the Marquis de Lafayette, who aided General George Washington in the American Revolutionary War.

Since the late 20th century, Fayette County has been part of the Greater Atlanta Metropolitan Area. It is located south of Atlanta, which is based in Fulton County. Fayette County is minutes from Hartsfield-Jackson International Airport. As a suburb of Atlanta, Fayette County has increased rapidly in population and development since the late 20th century, nearly doubling its population since 1990.

== History ==
Fayette County was created on May 15, 1821, from territory ceded to the United States by the Creek people, who had historically inhabited the area. It was named for the Marquis de Lafayette, French hero of the American Revolutionary War.

In the years following World War II, the county developed suburban residential communities, with many workers commuting to Atlanta. Peachtree City was chartered in 1959. It was developed as the only planned community in the county and in the Southeast; it covers 16,000 acres.

The county population has increased rapidly during the late twentieth century with the growth of Atlanta. It has also benefited from a reverse migration of African Americans to the South, as new residents are attracted to jobs and opportunities. Significant growth and development continues.

In 2002, Charles "Chuck" Floyd was appointed to the position of Chief Magistrate Judge of the county. In 2004 and 2008, he was elected to the position in his own right, thereby becoming the first African American ever elected to any office in the county.

== Geography ==
According to the U.S. Census Bureau, the county has a total area of 199 square miles (520 km^{2}), of which 194 square miles (500 km^{2}) is land and 5.0 square miles (13 km^{2}) (2.5%) is water.

The Flint River passes through the county and provided the earliest route for transportation and shipping of commodity crops. The entirety of Fayette County is located in the Upper Flint River sub-basin of the ACF River Basin (Apalachicola-Chattahoochee-Flint River Basin).

=== Major highways ===
- State Route 54
- State Route 74
- State Route 85
- State Route 92
- State Route 138
- State Route 279
- State Route 314

=== Adjacent counties ===
- Fulton County – north
- Clayton County – east
- Spalding County – south
- Coweta County – west

== Communities ==
=== Cities ===
- Fayetteville (county seat)
- Peachtree City (largest city)

=== Towns ===
- Brooks
- Tyrone
- Woolsey

=== Unincorporated communities ===
- Inman
- Starr's Mill

== Demographics ==
Historical population
Census	Pop.	Note	%±
1830	5,504		—
1840	6,191		12.5%
1850	8,709		40.7%
1860	7,047		−19.1%
1870	8,221		16.7%
1880	8,605		4.7%
1890	8,728		1.4%
1900	10,114		15.9%
1910	10,966		8.4%
1920	11,396		3.9%
1930	8,665		−24.0%
1940	8,170		−5.7%
1950	7,978		−2.4%
1960	8,199		2.8%
1970	11,364		38.6%
1980	29,043		155.6%
1990	62,415		114.9%
2000	91,263		46.2%
2010	106,567		16.8%
2020	119,194		11.8%
2025 (est.)	125,156	▲	5.0%
U.S. Decennial Census; 1790-1880 1890-1910; 1920-1930 1930-1940; 1940-1950 1960-1980; 1980-2000 2010 2020

=== Racial and ethnic composition ===
Fayette County, Georgia – Racial and ethnic composition Note: the US Census treats Hispanic/Latino as an ethnic category. This table excludes Latinos from the racial categories and assigns them to a separate category. Hispanics/Latinos may be of any race.
Race / Ethnicity (NH = Non-Hispanic)	Pop 1980	Pop 1990	Pop 2000	Pop 2010	Pop 2020	% 1980	% 1990	% 2000	% 2010	% 2020
White alone (NH)	27,410	56,958	74,820	72,202	68,144	94.38%	91.26%	81.98%	67.75%	57.17%
Black or African American alone (NH)	1,261	3,334	10,383	21,117	29,166	4.34%	5.34%	11.38%	19.82%	24.47%
Native American or Alaska Native alone (NH)	23	77	173	221	212	0.08%	0.12%	0.19%	0.21%	0.18%
Asian alone (NH)	97	1,039	2,183	4,106	6,362	0.33%	1.66%	2.39%	3.85%	5.34%
Native Hawaiian or Pacific Islander alone (NH)	x	x	21	61	44	x	x	0.02%	0.06%	0.04%
Other race alone (NH)	28	13	133	221	848	0.10%	0.02%	0.15%	0.21%	0.71%
Mixed race or Multiracial (NH)	x	x	968	1,879	4,938	x	x	1.06%	1.76%	4.14%
Hispanic or Latino (any race)	224	994	2,582	6,760	9,480	0.77%	1.59%	2.83%	6.34%	7.95%
Total	29,043	62,415	91,263	106,567	119,194	100.00%	100.00%	100.00%	100.00%	100.00%

As of the 2020 census, the residents of Fayetteville are predominantly African American, while those of Peachtree City and Tyrone are predominantly white.

=== 2020 census ===
As of the 2020 census, there were 119,194 people, 42,886 households, and 33,101 families residing in the county, and the median age was 44.0 years with 23.0% of residents under the age of 18 and 19.6% aged 65 or older. For every 100 females there were 92.3 males (88.8 for those 18 and over), and 81.9% of residents lived in urban areas while 18.1% lived in rural areas.

The racial makeup of the county was 58.5% White, 24.8% Black or African American, 0.3% American Indian and Alaska Native, 5.4% Asian, 0.0% Native Hawaiian and Pacific Islander, 3.3% from some other race, and 7.6% from two or more races. Hispanic or Latino residents of any race made up 8.0% of the population.

Of the 42,886 households in the county, 34.4% had children under the age of 18 living with them and 23.5% had a female householder with no spouse or partner present. About 20.2% of all households were made up of individuals and 10.9% had someone living alone who was 65 years of age or older.

There were 45,202 housing units, of which 5.1% were vacant. Among occupied housing units, 80.0% were owner-occupied and 20.0% were renter-occupied. The homeowner vacancy rate was 1.6% and the rental vacancy rate was 7.9%.

=== 2010 census ===
In 2010, the median income for a household in the county was $82,216 and the median income for a family was $92,976. Males had a median income of $68,381 versus $46,140 for females. The per capita income for the county was $35,076. About 3.4% of families and 4.7% of the population were below the poverty line, including 6.1% of those under age 18 and 3.8% of those age 65 or over.

=== 2000 census ===
In 2000, the median income for a household in the county was $71,227, and the median income for a family was $78,853 (these figures had risen to $79,498 and $89,873 respectively as of a 2007 estimate). Males had a median income of $54,738 versus $33,333 for females. The per capita income for the county was $29,464. About 2.00% of families and 2.60% of the population were below the poverty line, including 2.80% of those under age 18 and 4.60% of those age 65 or over.

== Government ==
=== Board of Commissioners ===
Fayette County is governed by a Board of Commissioners with five members. The 5th district, represented by Charles Oddo, is elected countywide. Republicans currently have a 4–1 majority.

Current composition of the Fayette County Board of Commissioners
District	Name	Affiliation	First elected
1	Eric Maxwell	Republican	2016
2	Lee Hearn	Republican	2020
3	Edward Gibbons	Republican	2018
4	Charles Rousseau	Democratic	2015
5	Charles Oddo	Republican	2012

==== Voting rights suit and settlement ====
Until 2013, the county was divided into three "county commission districts." Three of the members of the board of commissioners were required to live inside one of the designated districts. The remaining two commissioners could live anywhere in the county. All members of the county commission were elected "at-large," which meant that each candidate had to attract the majority of votes across the county in order to win. Since 1982, more than 100 cases of such at-large voting systems in Georgia have been replaced by single-member districts.

The five members of the school board were also elected at-large. In the early 21st century, Fayette County was one of only 20 school boards among 180 in the state of Georgia to maintain at-large voting to elect members of these boards. The practical effect was the exclusion of African Americans from these positions. The county has been majority-white and majority-Republican since the late 20th century. Neither Republican nor Democratic African-American candidates had any electoral success.

In 2011 the NAACP and several African-American county residents filed suit against the county and the board for the at-large voting system. In May 2013, the federal district court ordered the county and school board to change their systems of at-large voting, finding that it violated the Voting Rights Act of 1965 by diluting the voting power of the minority. African Americans make up 20% of the county population but were unable to elect candidates of their choice, as every commission and school board seat required a majority of county voters. The county has a majority-white, majority-Republican population.

Under the federal ruling, five districts were established so that members of both the school board and county commission are elected from single-member districts. This broadened representation on the boards. Voters of each district elect a commissioner living within its boundaries.

In 2014, Democrat Pota E. Coston was elected as the first black county commissioner in the 194-year history of the county. Leonard Presberg was first appointed and then elected in his own right as the first Jewish member of the school board.

The county and school board both appealed the federal district court ruling. In January 2015, the US Court of Appeals for the 11th Circuit in Atlanta remanded the case to the district court for a bench trial by the federal district judge, ruling that Judge Timothy Batten Sr. had made a technical error in granting summary judgment in the case. It did not overturn his ruling to establish the single-member district system. The bench trial by Judge Batten would give the county an opportunity to present additional evidence to support its case.

After Coston died in office, the Fayette Board of Elections voted to use at-large voting in a special election to replace her. The NAACP returned to court as it opposed using the former system. Judge Batten ruled that the county had to use the single-member district system established by his earlier ruling. In September 2015 Democrat Charles Rousseau was elected from District 5 to succeed Coston, becoming the second African American elected to the county commission. In October 2015 the Fayette Chamber of Commerce and two prominent white leaders urged the county to settle the nearly five-year lawsuit and accept district voting. Judge Batten ordered the two sides into mediation and postponed the bench trial. In January 2016 the Fayette County School Board voted unanimously to settle the lawsuit and accept district voting for election of its members. The County Commission voted to settle by a 3–2 vote.

Together with the NAACP and black county plaintiffs, the county commission agreed in January 2016 to a system of electing four members from single-member districts and the fifth as an at-large member. A law implementing this change was signed by Governor Nathan Deal in March 2016.

=== Politics ===
Fayette County has been a Republican stronghold since 1980. In 1980 and 1984, it was the most Republican county in the entire state. In 1980 in particular, it was the sole county in Georgia to vote against favorite son Jimmy Carter by over 15 percentage points. However, as the county's population has grown, the proportion of Republican voters has decreased significantly in recent elections. Republican presidential candidates' margins of victory have decreased from 31.2 percentage points for Mitt Romney in 2012, to 19.1 points for Donald Trump in 2016, to 6.8 points for Trump in 2020, to 3.1 points for Trump in 2024.

In the runoff for the 2022 United States Senate election in Georgia, Raphael Warnock narrowly lost the county in his re-election bid by a margin of 491 votes or 1%.

United States presidential election results for Fayette County, Georgia
Year	Republican		Democratic		Third party(ies)	
Year	No.	%	No.	%	No.	%
1880	183	26.83%	499	73.17%	0	0.00%
1884	246	29.85%	578	70.15%	0	0.00%
1888	204	22.79%	690	77.09%	1	0.11%
1892	192	15.71%	547	44.76%	483	39.53%
1896	345	35.64%	562	58.06%	61	6.30%
1900	141	22.17%	471	74.06%	24	3.77%
1904	59	12.47%	260	54.97%	154	32.56%
1908	162	24.81%	338	51.76%	153	23.43%
1912	12	2.60%	363	78.57%	87	18.83%
1916	25	4.24%	494	83.87%	70	11.88%
1920	80	25.72%	231	74.28%	0	0.00%
1924	24	7.43%	257	79.57%	42	13.00%
1928	190	34.11%	367	65.89%	0	0.00%
1932	6	0.80%	746	99.07%	1	0.13%
1936	70	8.55%	748	91.33%	1	0.12%
1940	44	7.09%	577	92.91%	0	0.00%
1944	98	11.14%	782	88.86%	0	0.00%
1948	54	4.72%	825	72.12%	265	23.16%
1952	195	13.84%	1,214	86.16%	0	0.00%
1956	138	9.54%	1,308	90.46%	0	0.00%
1960	359	23.06%	1,198	76.94%	0	0.00%
1964	1,349	59.98%	896	39.84%	4	0.18%
1968	867	26.22%	552	16.69%	1,888	57.09%
1972	3,401	88.31%	450	11.69%	0	0.00%
1976	2,837	43.28%	3,718	56.72%	0	0.00%
1980	6,351	60.20%	3,798	36.00%	400	3.79%
1984	12,575	81.47%	2,861	18.53%	0	0.00%
1988	16,443	77.84%	4,593	21.74%	87	0.41%
1992	17,576	55.47%	8,430	26.60%	5,681	17.93%
1996	21,005	63.25%	9,875	29.74%	2,329	7.01%
2000	29,338	69.11%	11,912	28.06%	1,199	2.82%
2004	37,346	70.97%	14,887	28.29%	391	0.74%
2008	38,501	64.77%	20,313	34.17%	627	1.05%
2012	38,075	64.83%	19,736	33.61%	917	1.56%
2016	35,048	56.98%	23,284	37.85%	3,179	5.17%
2020	37,956	52.71%	33,062	45.91%	994	1.38%
2024	38,177	51.15%	35,822	48.00%	634	0.85%

United States Senate election results for Fayette County, Georgia2
Year	Republican		Democratic		Third party(ies)	
Year	No.	%	No.	%	No.	%
2020	38,403	53.73%	31,477	44.04%	1,590	2.22%
2020	36,463	54.10%	30,938	45.90%	0	0.00%

United States Senate election results for Fayette County, Georgia3
Year	Republican		Democratic		Third party(ies)	
Year	No.	%	No.	%	No.	%
2020	21,759	30.67%	22,840	32.20%	26,343	37.13%
2020	36,094	53.56%	31,297	46.44%	0	0.00%
2022	30,178	50.33%	28,284	47.17%	1,496	2.50%
2022	27,071	50.45%	26,584	49.55%	0	0.00%

Georgia Gubernatorial election results for Fayette County
Year	Republican		Democratic		Third party(ies)	
Year	No.	%	No.	%	No.	%
1966	729	31.11%	1,550	66.15%	64	2.73%
1970	1,353	41.75%	1,881	58.04%	7	0.22%
1974	1,991	47.07%	2,238	52.91%	1	0.02%
1978	1,317	23.92%	4,190	76.08%	0	0.00%
1982	5,168	54.35%	4,341	45.65%	0	0.00%
1986	5,401	44.38%	6,769	55.62%	0	0.00%
1990	11,239	58.49%	7,423	38.63%	553	2.88%
1994	13,385	60.49%	8,743	39.51%	0	0.00%
1998	16,750	61.95%	9,120	33.73%	1,167	4.32%
2002	21,655	64.11%	11,377	33.68%	748	2.21%
2006	25,059	69.70%	9,321	25.93%	1,573	4.38%
2010	27,070	64.63%	13,032	31.12%	1,781	4.25%
2014	25,989	61.76%	15,047	35.76%	1,044	2.48%
2018	32,497	56.03%	24,796	42.75%	705	1.22%
2022	34,116	56.53%	25,769	42.70%	461	0.76%
2026	30,032	48.22%	32,246	51.78%	0	0.00%

Fayette County is one of nine counties that shifted more than 25 percentage points to the left from 2012 to 2024.

== Education ==
Fayette County is served by the Fayette County School System. The governing authority for the school system is known as the Fayette County Board of Education, a board of five elected persons. They hire a superintendent to manage daily operations of the schools.

Since a federal court ruling in 2013, resulting from the federal voting rights lawsuit described above, the five board members are each elected from single-member districts. In January 2016 after mediation, the school board voted unanimously to settle the lawsuit they had earlier appealed along with the county. The board accepted single-member districts for election of board members.

=== High schools ===
- Fayette County High School
- McIntosh High School
- Sandy Creek High School
- Starr's Mill High School
- Whitewater High School

=== Alternative schools ===
- Fayette County Alternative Education Program

== Notable people ==
- Paris Bennett, singer
- Chris Benoit, WWE wrestler
- Furman Bisher, longtime late sports columnist, Atlanta Journal-Constitution
- Robert H. Brooks, former chairman and CEO, Hooter's of America Inc.
- Zac Brown, Grammy award-winning singer, Zac Brown Band
- Robert J Burch, children's author
- Kandi Burruss, singer, reality TV star
- Kathy Cox, State School Superintendent
- Creflo Dollar, televangelist
- Mike Duke, former CEO of Wal-Mart Stores Inc.
- Lee Haney, retired professional bodybuilder and Mr. Olympia titleholder
- Evander Holyfield, retired professional boxer
- Tim Hudson, former starting pitcher with the Atlanta Braves and San Francisco Giants
- Calvin Johnson, former NFL receiver for the Detroit Lions, Sandy Creek HS and Georgia Tech alum
- Emmanuel Lewis, actor, Webster
- Carole Marsh, children's author and founder of Gallopade International
- Kelley O'Hara, United States Women's Soccer Player, 2011 FIFA World Cup silver medalist, 2012 Olympic gold medalist, 2015 FIFA World Cup gold medalist
- Paul Orndorff, pro wrestler
- Ferrol Sams, physician, humorist, storyteller, and best-selling novelist
- Reed Sorenson, NASCAR driver
- Christian Taylor, gold medal winner, 2012 Olympic Games (London) men's triple jump
- Gy Waldron, creator and executive producer, The Dukes of Hazzard
- John Waller, contemporary Christian singer
- Gary Anthony Williams, television and film actor

== See also ==
- National Register of Historic Places listings in Fayette County, GA
- List of counties in Georgia

== Other reading ==
- Charles S. Bullock III and Ronald Keith Gaddie, The Triumph of Voting Rights in the South (University of Oklahoma Press, 2009/2014)
- Carolyn C. Cary, ed., The History of Fayette County, 1821-1971 (Fayetteville, Ga.: Fayette County Historical Society, 1977).
- Fayette County Historical Society, The Fayette County Georgia Heritage Book (Waynesville, N.C.: Walsworth, 2003).
