= Fayette County School System (Georgia) =

School district in Georgia (U.S. state)

Fayette County School District

Address
- 205 LaFayette Avenue Fayetteville, Georgia, 30214-1518; United States
- Coordinates: 33.447678°N 84.461592°W

District information
- Grades: Pre-kindergarten – 12
- Superintendent: Jonathan S. Patterson
- Accreditations: Southern Association of Colleges and Schools; Georgia Accrediting Commission

Students and staff
- Enrollment: 20,070 (2022–23)
- Faculty: 1,466.20 (FTE)
- Student–teacher ratio: 13.69

Other information
- Telephone: (770) 460-3990
- Fax: (770) 460-8191
- Website: fcboe.org

Fayette County School System is a public school district based in Fayetteville, Georgia, United States and covering residents of Fayette County. The county is included in the Atlanta metropolitan area. The school system serves all of Fayette County.

Residents elect a five-member school board to set policy and hire a superintendent of schools. Until May 2013, school board members were elected at-large in the county; this jurisdiction was one of only 20 remaining among the 180 school districts in the state to elect board members by an exclusively at-large process. After trying to persuade the county board of commissioners to change the system, a coalition of residents, represented by the NAACP Legal Defense Fund, filed suit against the county and school board for violation of the Voting Rights Act of 1965, asserting that the county system diluted the voting power of the significant minority of African Americans, who today comprise 20% of the county population.

They had been prevented by this system (and disenfranchisement prior to 1965) from ever electing a candidate of their choice to the board or county council in 191 years. As a result of Georgia State Conference of the NAACP, et al. v. Fayette County Board of Commissioners, et al. (2013), the federal court ordered the county on May 22, 2013 to change its electoral system for the County Council and the County School Board to single-member districts, in order to correct and prevent such dilution of voting power. The court's ruling required "the Board of Commissioners and Board of Education to develop a district-based remedial plan that contains at least one district in which black voters comprise a majority of the voting-age population by June 25, 2013."

In August 2014, the Atlanta Journal-Constitution reported that superintendent Joseph Barrow Jr. created a tax-payer funded position to pay his wife $75,000 per year through the Fayette County School System. Despite concerns of nepotism raised by at least one member of the board of education and many teachers in the district, the district followed through with the plan.

== Elementary schools ==
- Braelinn Elementary
- Robert J. Burch Elementary
- Cleveland Elementary
- Crabapple Lane Elementary
- Fayetteville Elementary
- Huddleston Elementary
- Inman Elementary
- Kedron Elementary
- Sara Harp Minter Elementary
- North Fayette Elementary
- Oak Grove Elementary
- Peachtree City Elementary
- Peeples Elementary
- Spring Hill Elementary

== Middle schools ==
- Flat Rock Middle School
- J.C. Booth Middle School
- Whitewater Middle School
- Bennett's Mill Middle School
- Rising Starr Middle School
- Fayette Life Academy

== High schools ==
- Fayette County Open Campus
- Fayette County High School
- McIntosh High School
- Sandy Creek High School
- Starr's Mill High School
- Whitewater High School
