= Riley Swanson =

American football player (born 1984)

Profile
- Position: Defensive back

Personal information
- Born: April 20, 1984 (age 42); Atlanta, Georgia, U.S.
- Listed height: 6 ft 0 in (1.83 m)
- Listed weight: 185 lb (84 kg)

Career information
- College: Wake Forest

Career history

Playing
- Buffalo Bills (2007)*; Rio Grande Valley Dorados (2009); Arizona Rattlers (2010–2011); Tampa Bay Storm (2012); Arizona Rattlers (2013)
- * Offseason or practice squad member only

Coaching
- West Florida (2017) Running backs coach; West Florida (2018) Cornerbacks coach; Finlandia (2019) Defensive coordinator & defensive backs coach; St. Norbert College (2020–2021) Defensive coordinator; Tennessee State (2022–2023) Director of recruiting; Rockford (2023–2024) Associate head coach, defensive coordinator, & linebackers coach; Saint Louis Priory (2025–present) Head coach

Awards and highlights
- ArenaBowl champion (2013); Sporting News Freshman All-ACC (2003)

Career AFL statistics
- Tackles: 162
- Interceptions: 11
- Pass deflections: 25
- Stats at ArenaFan.com

Riley Swanson, Jr. (born April 20, 1984) is an American college football coach.

He played college football at defensive back for the Wake Forest Demon Deacons. He was signed by the Buffalo Bills as an undrafted free agent in 2007. Swanson played in the Arena Football League from 2010–2013 for the Arizona Rattlers and the Tampa Bay Storm. Swanson was on injury reserve with the Rattlers when they won ArenaBowl XXVI.
