= Fayette County Courthouse (Georgia) =

- U.S. National Register of Historic Places
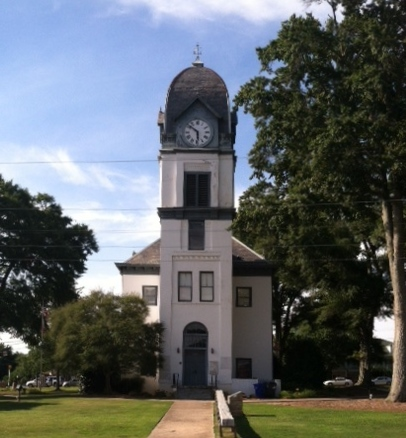

- Location within Georgia Location within the United States
- Interactive map showing the location of Fayette County Courthouse
- Location: GA 85, Fayetteville, Georgia
- Coordinates: 33°26′53″N 84°27′17″W
- Area: 1.5 acres (0.61 ha)
- Built: 1825, 1888, 1909, 1965
- Built by: Stewart, Finley G.
- Architect: Bruce & Morgan
- Architectural style: Second Empire, Carpenter
- MPS: Georgia County Courthouses TR
- NRHP reference No.: 80001020
- Added to NRHP: September 18, 1980

The Fayette County Courthouse in Fayetteville, Georgia was built in 1825. It was listed on the National Register of Historic Places in 1980.

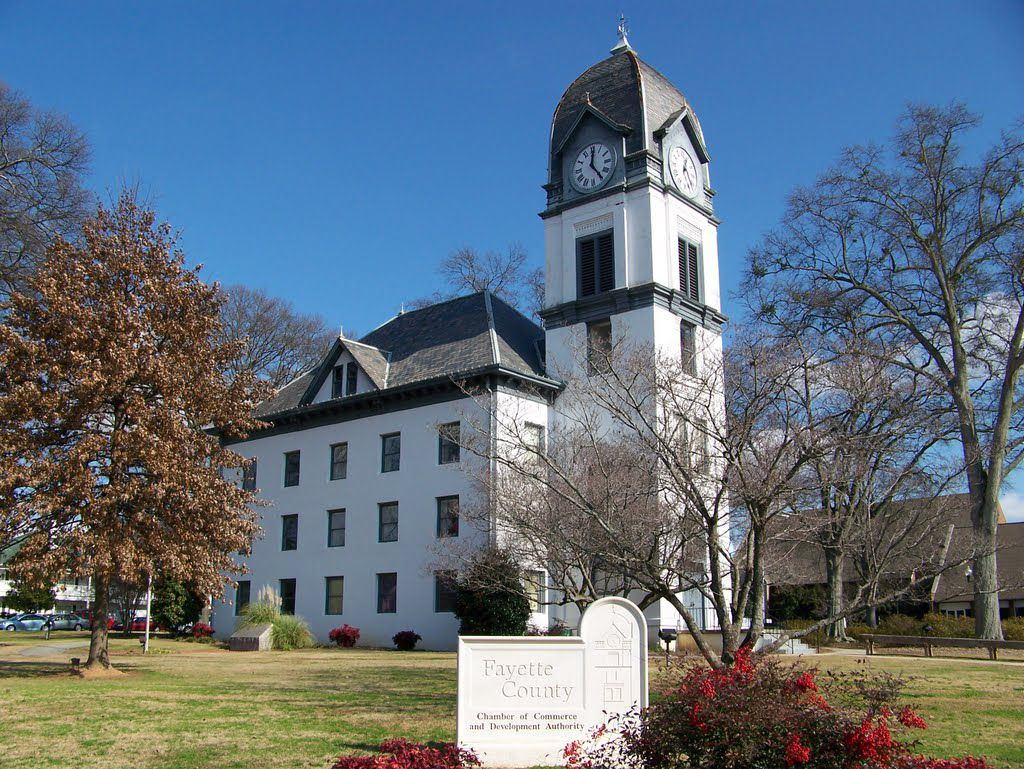
Old Fayette County Courthouse - October 2012

It is a brick building but was covered with gray stucco. It has a hipped roof with a bracketed cornice. Its tower was added in 1888; the tower's clock was installed in 1909. The building was renovated in 1965 at cost of $70,000.

In 1980 it was the oldest courthouse in Georgia in continuous use.
