= Whitewater High School (Georgia) =

Location
- 100 Wildcat Way; Fayetteville, Georgia 30215; United States
- 33°22′38″N 84°28′20″W

Information
- Type: Public secondary school
- Motto: "Knowledge, Opportunity, and Success"
- Established: 2003
- School district: Fayette County School System
- Principal: Krystin Hall
- Teaching staff: 87.70 (on an FTE basis)
- Grades: 9–12
- Enrollment: 1,347 (2023-2024)
- Student to teacher ratio: 15.36
- Campus: Rural fringe
- Colors: Cardinal red, silver and black
- Nickname: Wildcats
- Accreditation: Cognia
- Yearbook: Vision
- Website: fcboe.org/whs

Whitewater High School is a public secondary school in Fayetteville, Georgia, United States. It serves grades 9-12 for the Fayette County School System.

== Academics ==
Whitewater has been accredited by Cognia, or its predecessors, since 2003. The school was ranked 1,758th nationally, 42nd for Georgia and 3rd for Fayette County in the 2020 U.S. News & World Report's annual ranking of high schools.

== Demographics ==
The demographic breakdown of the 1,428 students enrolled for 2018-19 was:

- Male - 50.8%
- Female - 49.2%
- Native American/Alaskan - >0.1%
- Asian - 3.4%
- Black - 20.3%
- Hispanic - 8.1%
- Native Hawaiian/Pacific islanders - 0.1%
- White - 62.6%
- Multiracial - 5.5%

17.9% of the students were eligible for free or reduced-cost lunch.

== Notable alumni ==
- Kyle Dugger, National Football League (NFL) safety

== Fine Arts ==
=== Band ===
Whitewater High School features four performing ensembles that include a jazz band, a concert band, a symphonic band, and a wind ensemble. Concert, Symphonic, and Wind Ensembles all consecutively earn superior ratings at the GMEA Large Group Performance Evaluation (LGPE) each year. The Whitewater Marching Band also consistently places top spots in various marching competitions in the region, with them currently being the Grand Champion of the Lafayette Marching Classic for the second year in a row.
