= Union City, Georgia =

- City
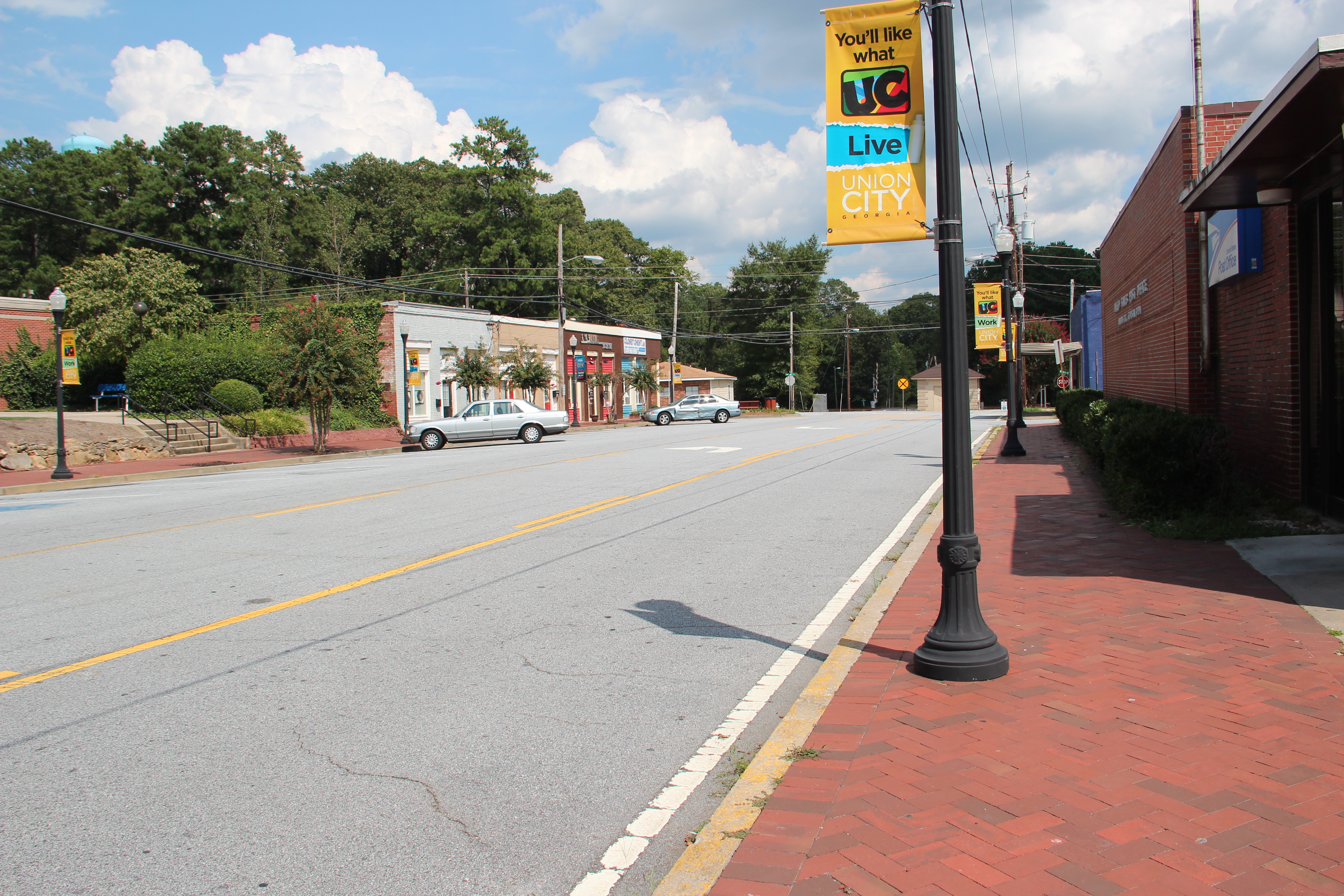
- Downtown Union City

- Flag Seal Logo
- Nickname: The Progressive City
- Coordinates: 33°36′18″N 84°29′37″W
- Country: United States
- State: Georgia
- County: Fulton

Area
  - Total: 19.83 sq mi (51.37 km^{2})
  - Land: 19.68 sq mi (50.96 km^{2})
  - Water: 0.16 sq mi (0.41 km^{2})
- Elevation: 971 ft (296 m)

Population (2020)
  - Total: 26,830
  - Density: 1,363.7/sq mi (526.51/km^{2})
- Time zone: UTC-5 (Eastern (EST))
  - Summer (DST): UTC-4 (EDT)
- ZIP code: 30291
- Area code: 770
- FIPS code: 13-78324
- GNIS feature ID: 2405627
- Website: unioncityga.org

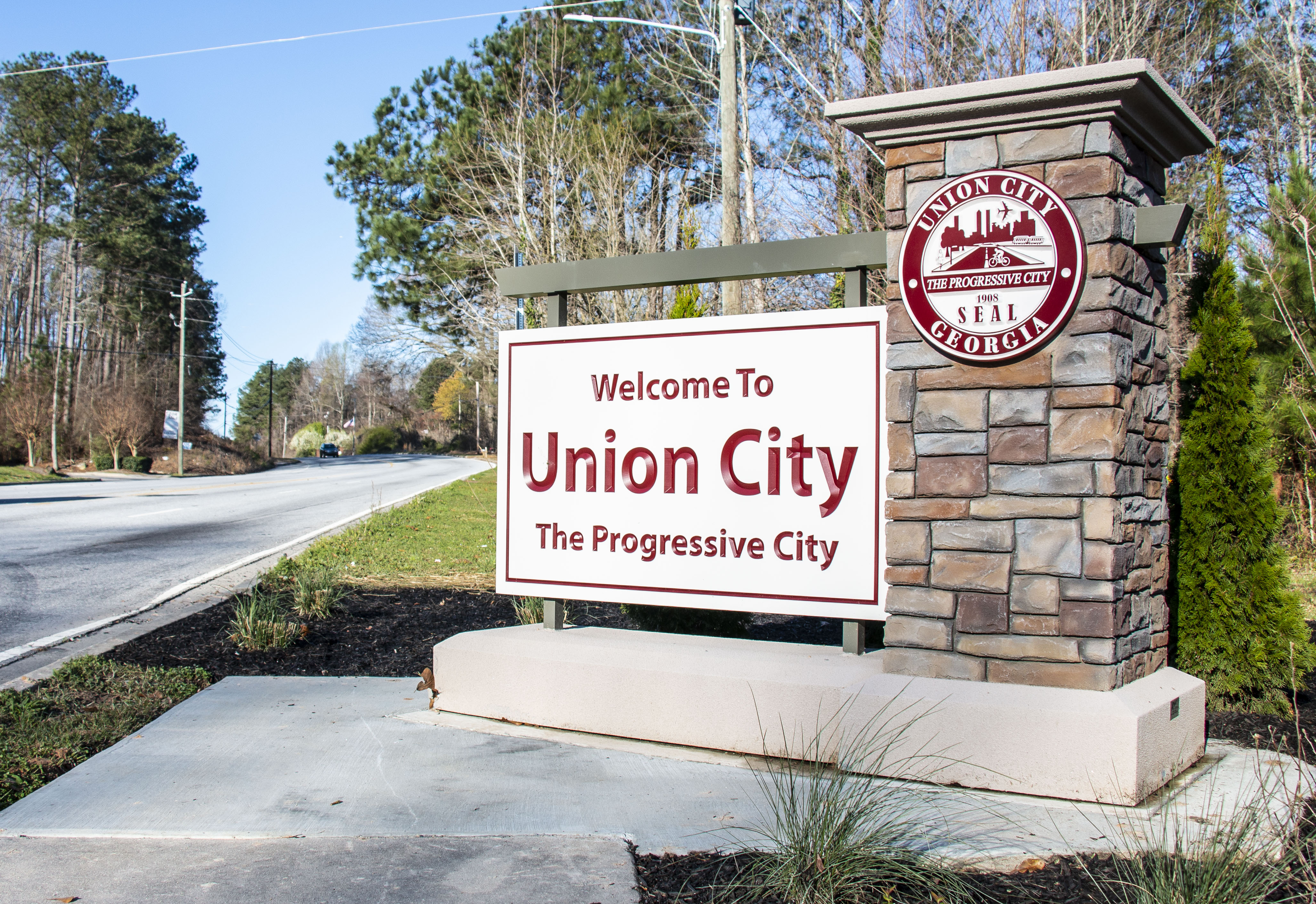
Union City Gateway sign located on Flat Shoals Road

Union City is a city in Fulton County, Georgia, United States. The population was 26,830 at the 2020 census.

== History ==
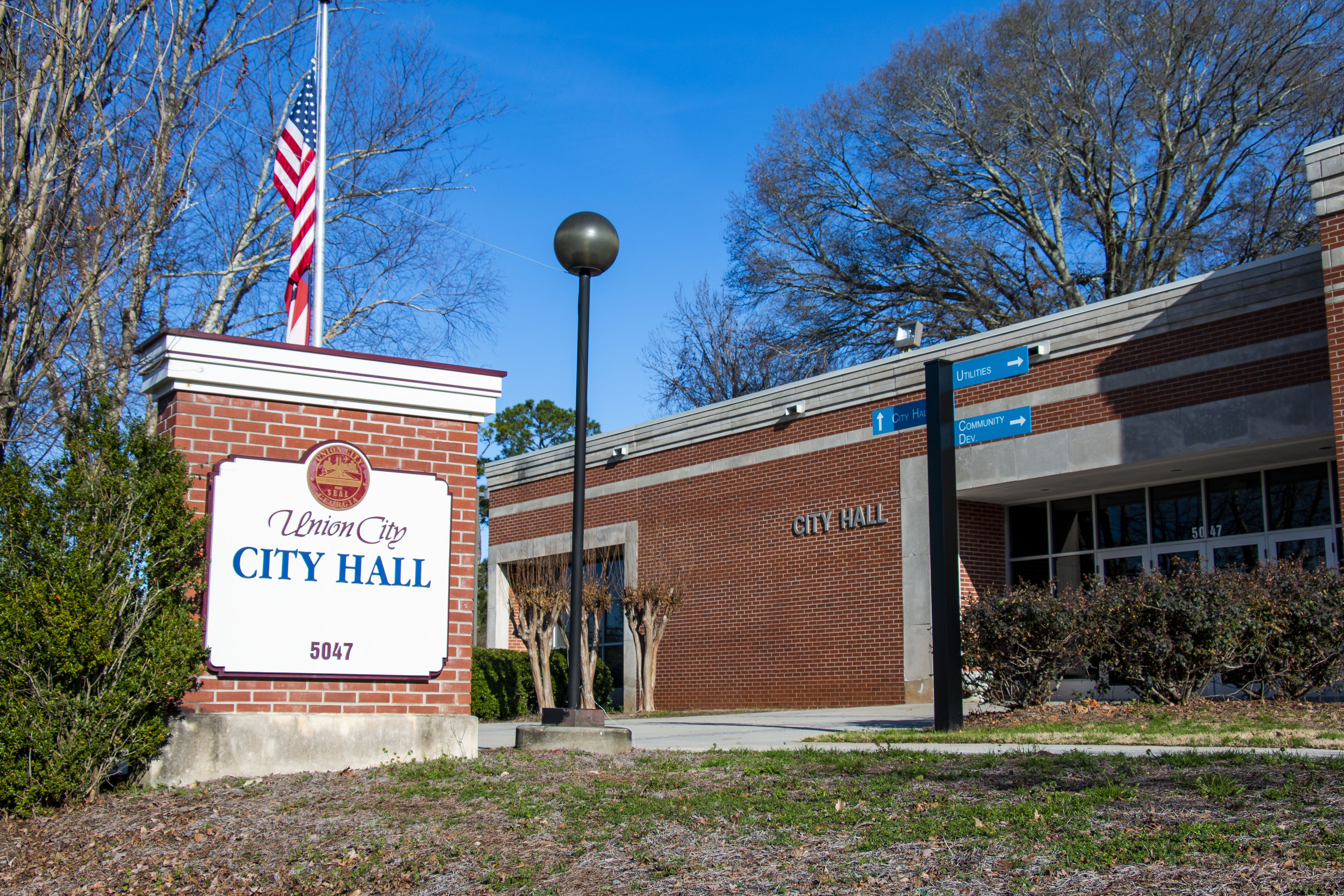
Union City Hall

The Georgia General Assembly incorporated Union City in 1908. One source claims that the town was named for the union of rails at a railroad junction, while another version states the name commemorates a "Farmer's Union" which once was headquartered here.

== Geography ==
According to the United States Census Bureau, the city has a total area of 19.3 square miles (50.0 km^{2}), of which 19.1 square miles (49.5 km^{2}) is land and 0.2 square miles (0.5 km^{2}), or 0.83%, is water.

== Demographics ==
Historical population
Census	Pop.	Note	%±
1910	534		—
1920	620		16.1%
1930	776		25.2%
1940	884		13.9%
1950	1,490		68.6%
1960	2,118		42.1%
1970	3,031		43.1%
1980	4,780		57.7%
1990	8,375		75.2%
2000	11,621		38.8%
2010	19,456		67.4%
2020	26,830		37.9%
2025 (est.)	29,910	▲	11.5%
U.S. Decennial Census; 1850-1870 1870-1880; 1890-1910 1920-1930; 1940 1950 1960; 1970 1980 1990; 2000 2010; 2025

=== Racial and ethnic composition ===
Union City city, Georgia – Racial and ethnic composition Note: the US Census treats Hispanic/Latino as an ethnic category. This table excludes Latinos from the racial categories and assigns them to a separate category. Hispanics/Latinos may be of any race.
Race / Ethnicity (NH = Non-Hispanic)	Pop 2000	Pop 2010	Pop 2020	% 2000	% 2010	% 2020
White alone (NH)	2,690	1,667	1,220	23.15%	8.57%	4.55%
Black or African American alone (NH)	7,998	15,852	22,686	68.82%	81.48%	84.55%
Native American or Alaska Native alone (NH)	26	43	51	0.22%	0.22%	0.19%
Asian alone (NH)	147	148	135	1.26%	0.76%	0.50%
Native Hawaiian or Pacific Islander alone (NH)	3	1	12	0.03%	0.01%	0.04%
Other race alone (NH)	19	59	147	0.16%	0.30%	0.55%
Mixed race or Multiracial (NH)	131	318	586	1.13%	1.63%	2.18%
Hispanic or Latino (any race)	607	1,368	1,993	5.22%	7.03%	7.43%
Total	11,621	19,456	26,830	100.00%	100.00%	100.00%

=== 2020 census ===
As of the 2020 census, Union City had a population of 26,830 and 4,681 families. The median age was 33.5 years. 26.7% of residents were under the age of 18 and 11.9% were 65 years of age or older. For every 100 females there were 79.1 males, and for every 100 females age 18 and over there were 72.9 males age 18 and over.

99.9% of residents lived in urban areas, while 0.1% lived in rural areas.

There were 10,604 households in Union City, of which 35.8% had children under the age of 18 living in them. Of all households, 22.2% were married-couple households, 22.2% were households with a male householder and no spouse or partner present, and 48.9% were households with a female householder and no spouse or partner present. About 35.4% of all households were made up of individuals and 12.3% had someone living alone who was 65 years of age or older.

There were 11,414 housing units, of which 7.1% were vacant. The homeowner vacancy rate was 1.7% and the rental vacancy rate was 7.2%.

Racial composition as of the 2020 census
Race	Number	Percent
White	1,466	5.5%
Black or African American	22,918	85.4%
American Indian and Alaska Native	88	0.3%
Asian	138	0.5%
Native Hawaiian and Other Pacific Islander	13	0.0%
Some other race	1,154	4.3%
Two or more races	1,053	3.9%
Hispanic or Latino (of any race)	1,993	7.4%

=== 2000 census ===
In 2000, the median household income was $35,322 and the median family income was $39,697. Males had a median income of $30,421 versus $28,111 for females. The per capita income for the city was $17,208. About 9.9% of families and 12.1% of the population were below the poverty line, including 14.0% of those under age 18 and 14.3% of those age 65 or over.

== Education ==
=== K-12 schools ===
Union City is in the Fulton County School District.

Elementary schools

- C.H. Gullatt Elementary
- Liberty Point Elementary
- Oakley Elementary School

Middle schools

- Bear Creek Middle (serves students in Palmetto and Fairburn)
- Camp Creek Middle School

High school

- Creekside High School (serves students in Palmetto and Fairburn)
- Langston Hughes High School
- Benjamin E. Banneker High School

Charter schools

- Hapeville Charter Career Academy

=== Colleges and universities ===
- Georgia Military College
