= Tyrone, Georgia =

- Town
- Location in Fayette County and the state of Georgia
- Coordinates: 33°28′25″N 84°35′28″W
- Country: United States
- State: Georgia
- County: Fayette
- Established: 1909
- Named for: County Tyrone

Area
  - Total: 12.88 sq mi (33.36 km^{2})
  - Land: 12.51 sq mi (32.39 km^{2})
  - Water: 0.37 sq mi (0.97 km^{2})
- Elevation: 981 ft (299 m)

Population (2020)
  - Total: 7,658
  - Density: 612.4/sq mi (236.44/km^{2})
- Time zone: UTC-5 (Eastern (EST))
  - Summer (DST): UTC-4 (EDT)
- ZIP code: 30290
- Area codes: 770, 678
- FIPS code: 13-78044
- GNIS feature ID: 0324475
- Major airport: ATL
- Website: tyronega.gov

Tyrone is a town in Fayette County, Georgia, United States. The population was 7,658 in 2020. The estimated population in 2018 was 7,388. It is a part of the Atlanta metropolitan area.

== History ==
The Georgia General Assembly incorporated Tyrone as a town in 1911. The community's name is a transfer from County Tyrone, in Northern Ireland.

== Geography ==
Tyrone is located in the northwest corner of Fayette County at 33°28′25″N 84°35′28″W (33.473563, -84.591229). It is bordered to the south by Peachtree City, to the west by Coweta County, across Line Creek, and the north by Fulton County.

Georgia State Route 74, the Joel Cowan Parkway, passes through Tyrone, leading north 5 miles (8 km) to Interstate 85 on the south side of Fairburn. Downtown Atlanta is 25 miles (40 km) northeast of Tyrone via SR 74 and I-85.

According to the United States Census Bureau, Tyrone has a total area of 12.9 square miles (33.3 km^{2}), of which 12.5 square miles (32.3 km^{2}) is land and 0.4 square miles (1.0 km^{2}), or 2.94%, is water.

== Demographics ==
Historical population
Census	Pop.	Note	%±
1930	128		—
1940	118		−7.8%
1950	156		32.2%
1960	124		−20.5%
1970	131		5.6%
1980	1,038		692.4%
1990	2,724		162.4%
2000	3,916		43.8%
2010	6,879		75.7%
2020	7,658		11.3%
2025 (est.)	8,091	▲	5.7%
U.S. Decennial Census; 2025

=== 2020 census ===
As of the 2020 census, Tyrone had a population of 7,658. The median age was 42.9 years. 23.3% of residents were under the age of 18 and 16.8% of residents were 65 years of age or older. For every 100 females there were 95.1 males, and for every 100 females age 18 and over there were 91.6 males age 18 and over.

84.4% of residents lived in urban areas, while 15.6% lived in rural areas.

There were 2,575 households in Tyrone, of which 38.6% had children under the age of 18 living in them. Of all households, 68.3% were married-couple households, 10.3% were households with a male householder and no spouse or partner present, and 18.1% were households with a female householder and no spouse or partner present. About 14.0% of all households were made up of individuals and 6.9% had someone living alone who was 65 years of age or older. There were 2,178 families residing in the town.

There were 2,698 housing units, of which 4.6% were vacant. The homeowner vacancy rate was 1.1% and the rental vacancy rate was 7.6%.

Tyrone racial composition as of 2020
Race	Num.	Perc.
White (non-Hispanic)	4,186	54.66%
Black or African American (non-Hispanic)	2,357	30.78%
Native American	17	0.22%
Asian	298	3.89%
Pacific Islander	4	0.05%
Other/mixed	364	4.75%
Hispanic or Latino	432	5.64%

== Education ==
Within the town of Tyrone there are three public schools: Burch Elementary, Flat Rock Middle, and Sandy Creek High School. These three are located in a triangle configuration on the same street (Jenkins Road). Our Lady of Victory Catholic School is located on Kirkley (aka "Kirkly") Road off Highway 74. South of town is Crabapple Elementary School. East of town is Bennett's Mill Middle School.

== Notable people ==
- Joey Clanton, NASCAR driver
- Calvin Johnson, former NFL wide receiver, Pro Football Hall of Fame inductee
- Brian Branch, NFL safety for the Detroit Lions
- Andrew Gardner, NFL football player, Miami Dolphins
- Kedric Golston, NFL football player, Washington Redskins
- Mike Hilton, NFL football player, Cincinnati Bengals
- Jody Knowles, NASCAR driver
- Morris Robinson, operatic bass, Metropolitan Opera
- Brittany Swann, Miss Georgia USA 2007
