= Fayette County High School (Georgia) =

Location
- 1 Tiger Trail; Fayetteville, Georgia 30214; United States; 33.451677°N 84.45844°W

Information
- Type: Public secondary
- Established: 1925
- School district: Fayette County School District
- Principal: Andrea Cherry-Lee
- Teaching staff: 93.20 (on an FTE basis)
- Grades: 9–12
- Enrollment: 1,360 (2024–2025)
- Student to teacher ratio: 14.59
- Campus: Suburban
- Colors: Black and gold
- Athletics: Football, basketball, baseball, wrestling, lacrosse, track & field, golf, volleyball, soccer, swimming, and riflery
- Mascot: Tiger
- Nickname: Fay Co
- Website: Fayette County High School

Fayette County High School (FCHS) is located in Fayetteville, Georgia, United States. It was named a National Blue Ribbon School in 1999 and a Georgia School of Excellence in 2000. The school enrolls approximately 1,759 students in grades 9-12. Fayette County High School is accredited by the Southern Association of Colleges and Schools. The school's mascot is a tiger.

== Academics ==
The school graduates over ninety percent of its attendees. Its students' standardized test scores often exceed state and national testing averages. Most graduates who go to college attend in-state schools, particularly Agnes Scott College, Emory, Georgia Tech, University of Georgia, Georgia State University, Georgia Southern University, and Morehouse College.

== History ==
Fayette County High School is at its fourth location. The first two buildings burned: the first in the 1930s, and the second on March 4, 1954. Before 1954, Fayette County offered no secondary education to its African-American citizens. After the 1954 fire, Fayette County built two high schools in different locations: the white Fayette County High School on Lafayette Avenue, and the black Fayette County Training School on Booker Avenue. When Georgia integrated its public schools in 1969, black students moved to Fayette County High, and the old Fayette County Training School became Fayette County Junior High until a new Middle School was built on Grady Ave, then the old training school was used to house East Fayette Elementary School. In the mid-1990s, Fayette County High moved into a new campus across Tiger Trail from the old school. The building that had housed FCHS from 1955 to 1995 became home to Fayette Community School it is now houses the Fayette County Board of Education.

== Fine arts ==
In the 1990s, the band, choral, orchestra, and drama departments received awards on the local, state, regional, and national levels.

The choral department's Select Chorus performed in Europe in 1999.

In 2019, the choral department rebranded and is now known as The Fayette Chorale.

The Marching Tigers have been a Bands of America regional finalist multiple times. The band performed in the 2000 Sydney Olympics Opening Ceremony, the 2005 London New Year's Day Parade, the 2007 Tournament of Roses Parade in Pasadena, California, and returned for the 2009 London New Year's Parade.

The fight song that the band plays after touchdowns is the "Tiger Rag", a common fight song for schools with Tiger mascots. Auburn, Clemson, and LSU all use the "Tiger Rag" in some capacity.

== Athletics ==
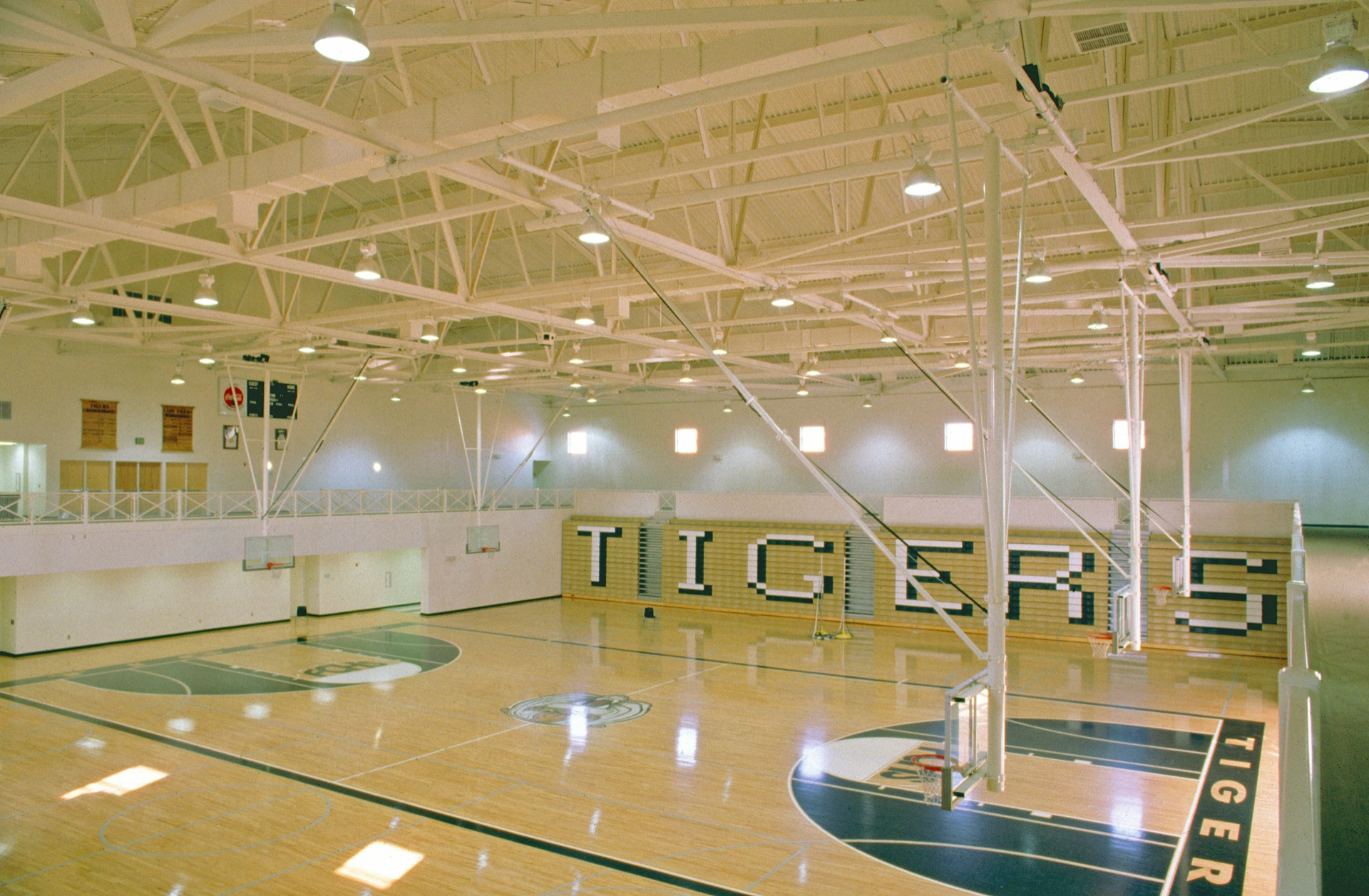
Fayette County High School gym in 2007

The school colors are black and Vegas gold. The Tigers send competitors to state playoffs in baseball, basketball, soccer, volleyball, and wrestling on a regular basis.

=== Football ===
The 1980 team (10-2) was ranked #4 at season's end by the Atlanta Journal-Constitution.

=== Wrestling ===
The 2010 Tiger wrestling squad won the Area 5-AAAA Duals title.

=== Girls' basketball ===
The Fayette County Lady Tigers basketball team first rose to prominence in the mid-1980s, when current Hofstra University Head Basketball Coach Krista Kilburn-Steveskey starred for FCHS. The Lady Tigers advanced to the Class AAAA basketball state championship game in both 2008 and 2009, falling to Southwest Dekalb both times.

=== Softball ===
The Lady Tigers softball team won the 2002 Class AAAAA Championship. Ashley Holcombe, a member of the 2002 state title team, went on to star at Alabama and made Team USA in 2009 and 2010.

=== Esports ===
The Fayette County High School ESports team stream their matches on Twitch.

== Debate ==
In the 2008–2009 season, the Fayette County Debate Team won the GFCA AAAA Policy Debate State Championship and GFCA Lincoln Douglas State Championship.

== Notable alumni ==
- Brandon Boykin, 2011 Paul Hornung Award winner as a Georgia Bulldogs football player and cornerback for the Baltimore Ravens of the National Football League
- Logan Browning, actress best known for starring as Samantha White in the Netflix satirical-drama series, Dear White People
- David Buchanan, KBO League pitcher for the Samsung Lions
- Matt Daniels, played football for Duke University and the St. Louis Rams
- Mike Duke, American businessman and fourth chief executive officer of Walmart
- Priah Ferguson, actress best known for starring as Erica Sinclair in the Netflix series, Stranger Things
- Niko Goodrum, MLB outfielder for the Houston Astros
- Ronnie Mabra, former member of the Georgia House of Representatives
- Adam Smith, basketball player for Hapoel Holon in the Israel Basketball Premier League
