= Richard Rusk =

American environmental activist

Richard Geary Rusk
- Born: March 30, 1946; Washington, District of Columbia, United States
- Died: January 28, 2018 (aged 71); Athens, Georgia, United States
- Other names: Rich
- Occupations: Truck-driver, journalist, activist
- Years active: 1964-2018
- Known for: Founding the Moore's Ford Memorial Committee
- Notable work: As I Saw It (1990)
- Spouses: Linda Gologergen (common-law), Frances Louise Mitchell, Janice Lanford
- Children: 3

Richard "Rich" Geary Rusk (March 30, 1946 – January 28, 2018) was an American environmental activist and the founder of the Moore's Ford Memorial Committee.

== From Washington to Nome ==
Rusk was born in Washington DC, the son of U.S. Secretary of State Dean Rusk and Virginia Rusk (née Foisie). About his famous father, Rusk stated: "He really loved this country, in part, I supposed because he came off a 40-acre farm in Cherokee County, Georgia. And never forgot it. He was astonished that a boy from that background could go on and be Secretary of State." Rusk grew up in Washington and in Scarsdale, New York. As his father was busy with various governmental functions and then as serving as the director of the Rockefeller Foundation, his son recalled: "'I remember from childhood a sense of aloneness, a hunger that was constant and rarely satisfied. It seemed that as a child I could never retain more than a fraction of my father`s attention. Even when he was home, it often seemed that he was away."

After graduating from the Woodrow Wilson High School where he excelled at football, he enlisted in the Marine Corps, where he was trained as a sharp-shooter. Rusk did not serve in Vietnam. After completing his military service, he attended Cornell University, studying political science. In September 1967, when his sister Peggy married a black man, Guy Smith, making headlines in the newspapers, Rusk supported his sister's marriage, later saying in 2014: "They had a terrific marriage. Guy died two years ago. He went from that marriage to fly a Huey Helicopter gunship in Vietnam."

Rusk came to be opposed to the Vietnam War, which caused him to come into conflict with his father who was serving as Secretary of State. Dean Rusk came to serve as the principal spokesman for the Johnson administration's policies in Vietnam, assuming a sternly professorial image as he travelled across America defending the war. Richard Rusk recalled: "...I’d bring home classmates from Cornell University. Everyone I knew at Cornell was against the war and they would be coming down to Washington for some massive, anti-war rally and oftentimes they would stay right at our house. And my dad would see them coming down the sidewalk and he’d say ‘Well fellas, you’re welcome to stay here but you park your signs in the umbrella rack at the front door.'" Despite the expectations of his family, Rusk refused to volunteer for what he called the "growing horror of Vietnam". Rusk was involved in an anti-war group at Cornell that printed pamphlets criticizing the war, and found his loyalties torn in March 1967 when his father arrived at Cornell to give a pro-war speech. Rusk decided not to join a group of about 50 activists who during the speech of the secretary of state donned white death masks and turned their backs on Dean Rusk.

Out of love for his father, Rusk refused to attend anti-war demonstrations, but he believed that the strain caused him to suffer a nervous breakdown. In the same 2014 interview, Rusk stated: "I became so obsessed with all the death and the destruction. All ended with me in a nervous breakdown at Cornell in January 1970." A psychologist told him: "You had your father`s nervous breakdown."" One friend of Rusk's recalled: "Rich then and for the rest of his life hated what his country had done in Vietnam, and because of his father felt a deep personal responsibility for the damage we inflicted on the Vietnamese people."

In 1970, Rusk had a break with his father over the Vietnam war and did not speak to him for the next 14 years. Rusk came to feel that his father was "the architect of that murderous human tragedy". Rusk decided to move to Alaska because "It was as far away as I could get from Washington, D.C, and still keep my American citizenship." From 1970 to 1984, Rusk lived in Nome, Alaska, where he worked in construction and edited the local newspaper The Bering Straits. An adventurous character, he once walked across St. Lawrence Island alone just to explore one of the remotest parts of the United States. Additionally, Rusk taught English to the local Inuit children. Rusk spent much of his time in Alaska hunting and fishing, and fathered a son, Ryan, with his girlfriend Linda Gologergen. Subsequently, he married Frances Louise Mitchell, by whom he fathered two children, Andrew and Sarah.

== Reconciliation ==
In June 1984, Rusk and his family moved to Athens, Georgia to seek a reconciliation with his father. Dean Rusk had famously vowed never to write his memoirs, but to achieve a reconciliation with his son, agreed to the project. As Rusk remembered it: "I parked myself on the doorstep, said in a brave voice 'We're going to write a book Pop' and turned on the tape recorder". Rusk pere who had gone blind by this point, agreed to dictate his memoirs to his son who recorded what he said and wrote it down into what became the memoir As I Saw It, which was published in 1990. Rusk noted that his father's "private views as an old man in the 1980s barely waved from his views as Secretary of State two decades earlier".

By his own admission, the writing process was tense as the son sought to challenge his father. About the Bay of Pigs invasion, the elder Rusk told his son that his own experiences in World War Two left him convinced that there was no way that a single brigade of Cuban exiles could overthrow Cuba's Communist government and that he "deeply regretted" not telling Kennedy this, saying it was his belief at the time that the Secretary of State should not question the president's decisions. The elder Rusk admitted that he underestimated the persistence of the North Vietnamese people while he overestimated the persistence of the American people. When the younger Rusk asked "Well Pop, what lay behind that persistence? Why did they never stop coming?", the elder Rusk replied about the Communist social control and fanaticism in North Vietnam, leading his son to burst out "Do you really believe what you are saying? Who were these people? Why did they fight so hard?" In response to his son's questions, the elder Rusk answered "I really don't have much to offer on that, Rich". Rusk wrote: "Both of us were emotionally drained. I turned off the tape recorder. There would be no mea culpa." Likewise, Rusk was frustrated with his father's unwillingness to show emotion, asking him about how he felt about the assassination of John F. Kennedy, only to receive the reply "Well, I never tried to put it into words." The younger Rusk responded "Damn it, that's exactly what we're trying to do now. Take a stab at it." Rusk described the writing process as an attempt by his father "to find any ties that might still bind us together."

Rusk fils wrote a preface to every chapter in As I Saw It, many quite critical of his father. About the Vietnam War, the younger Rusk wrote: "With this reticent, reserved, self-contained, emotionally bound-up father of mine from rural Georgia, how could the decision making have gone any differently? His taciturn qualities, which served him so well in negotiating with the Russians, ill-prepared him for the wrenching, introspective, soul-shattering journey that a true reappraisal of Vietnam policy would have involved. Although trained for high office, he was unprepared for such a journey, for admitting that thousands of American lives, and hundreds of thousands of Vietnamese, might have been lost in vain". Elsewhere, Rusk noted that the year 1968, "the most climactic since the Civil War" was only a "blur" to his father who was drinking very heavily by that point. In 1990, Rusk told Newsweek about his father: "Whatever rap he took, he probably deserved. He never doubted in public the way the war was conducted; he didn't in private, either." At the same time, Rusk defended his father against the criticism made by the Kennedy "court historian" Arthur Schlesinger Jr. who said the Rusk pere as "a baffling leader” who had "authority but not command", which Rusk fils suggested was a way of saying his father "wasn’t smart enough for the job."

In Athens, Rusk worked as a truck driver and worked for a local newspaper, the Oconee Arrow. Shortly after As I Saw It was published, Rusk was interviewed and still maintained his opposition to the Vietnam War, saying "It just seemed like pouring lives down a drain". In 1990, the publication of As I Saw It, being the product of the efforts of father and son, attracted much media attention, who presented it as a symbol that the scars caused by the Vietnam War were beginning to heal. In 1990, Newsweek described Rusk as rebellious and rambunctious, a man who dressed in T-shirts and baseball caps, being the polar opposition of his quiet, reserved father who was always dressed formally in business suits. Through the younger Rusk was not formally trained as a historian, the historian George C. Herring praised his efforts at history-writing, stating: "For this invaluable portrait of a complex and controversial figure, we can be grateful that an estranged son made the long trek back from Alaska and persuaded his father, in the interest of reconciliation, to write the memoir he sworn not to write. In getting to know his father, he left a record that will permit others to better understand him and his place in the history of a tumultuous era". In a review of As I Saw It, the historian Michael Beschloss wrote: "And no one could fail to be impressed by the fact that this reticent man succeeded in rearing a son who could write about him and their relationship with such obvious feeling and sensitivity."

On 8 October 1990, following the massive success of the PBS documentary series The Civil War which aired in September 1990, an article "The Civil War and Modern Memory" appeared in Newsweek which approvingly noted that both the grandfathers of Dean Rusk had served in the Confederate Army, and that Rusk himself had served in World War Two in the CBI (China-Burma-India) theater and then as Secretary of State during the Vietnam war. The article presented war as "tests of fire", a glorious, if painful trial of American manhood, arguing that there was a sort of mystical connection linking successive generations of American men who fought in wars starting with those who fought on the "most hallowed ground" of the Civil War with the Rusk family being an especially prominent example of "the line unbroken". The historian Lynda Boose objected to this picture, noting that Richard Rusk was passionately opposed to the Vietnam war, and she wrote the mystical "threads that connect" that were said to have started with the Rusk family in 1861 were "broken" in the 1960s.

== The Memory of Injustice ==
In 1991, Rusk married his second wife, Janice Lanford. While working for the Arrow, he first learned about the Moore's Ford lynchings, when four black people, two men and two women, were lynched on 25 July 1946. The four victims were Roger and Dorothy Malcom, and George and Mae Murray Dorsey. Mae Dorsey was 7 months pregnant when she was killed. In 1992, he first learned about the lynching where a 56-year-old man who was aged 10 in 1946 contacted him to tell him about that he witnessed the lynching first-hand and named 4 members of the lynch mob. Rusk recalled: "I was just stunned. That same day, I drove to the bridge and got up on the bridge and just starred into the muddy water of the Apalachee River. I just tried to imagine what could had led to such horror".

Rusk came to be obsessed with the Moore's Ford lynchings and in 1997, he founded the Moore's Ford Memorial Committee to commemorate the incident and pressed the state of Georgia to investigate the killers, some of whom were still alive in the 1990s. Rusk was inspired by hearing the South African Anglican bishop Desmond Tutu say in a speech that the United States needed something similar to the Truth and Reconciliation Commission in South Africa. Rusk recalled that founding the committee was a daunting task as he stated: "It was a spooky feeling. You're talking about dragging up a racial atrocity like a lynching in your community where the descendants of victims and killers are all around you". The committee restored the graves of the victims which had been neglected since 1946, started scholarship to benefit blacks students from poor families, and held arts shows to "raise public awareness of the tragedy". George Dorsey was a World War Two veteran who had been denied a veteran's funeral in 1946, and Rusk arranged for the proper military respects to be paid to him. On 16 May 1998, Rusk gave a speech at the Carver Middle School in Monroe, Georgia where he urged people to remember the atmosphere of fear that prevailed in the South 52 years ago, and to honor the courage of Lamar Howard, a black man nearly beaten to death in 1947 for offering to testify against the men who lynched the Malcolms and the Dorseys. Most of all, Rusk called for racial reconciliation, saying that even if the killers were never brought to justice, that by honoring the memory of black people lynched would make America into a better place for people of all races. Many in the mostly black audience were very moved by Rusk's speech. As late as April 2006 Rusk still had hopes that at least some of the now elderly perpetrators of the Moore's Ford lynching might finally be charged, saying: "There is still time. Attitudes are changing-things are loosening up a bit".

Rusk's pressure forced Georgia to put up a historical marker to commemorate the incident in 1999 and drew attention to a matter that most had forgotten. Rusk came into conflict with the black members of the Moore's Ford Memorial Committee over plans to stage a reenactment of the lynching of the two black couples every 25 July, which were first staged in 2005. In 2016, he told The Guardian newspaper: “We thought it was a step too far. Many steps too far. Totally inappropriate, too divisive. I mean, can you name one other place in the world where people get together to act out a horrible, disgusting piece of racial violence with absolutely no element of uplift? Can you?” Rusk accused the Democratic politician Tyrone Brooks of fabricating details about the Moore's Ford lynching to sensationalize the crime, contending that the story about an unborn child being cut out and ripped from the womb of Dorothy Malcolm was a lie. The reenactment were sponsored by the Georgia Association of Black Elected Officials (GABEO) led by Brooks. In an opinion piece, Rusk wrote that he felt that the reenactments were in bad taste, but also wrote: "GABEO colleagues have the right to gather at this bridge and exercise their First Amendment rights".

In 2007, Rusk and other members of the Moore's Ford Memorial Committee discovered evidence from the FBI files that the lynchings of the Malcoms and Dorseys at Moore's Ford were ordered by the former governor of Georgia, Eugene Talmadge, as part of his election campaign in 1946. At the time, Rusk told a journalist: "It would not surprise me if state officials at all levels were implicated, if not in the actual killings, at least in the cover-up that followed. The conspiracy of silence wasn't just the fault of the local farmers. It was the entire culture, from the top down.".

Rusk came to expand the work of the Moore's Ford Memorial Committee to investigate all 542 lynchings in Georgia between 1885 and 1930. Many were unhappy with his work as one old black man told him: "It was bad enough living through those years. I don't want to be reminded of them". Rusk soon expanded his work to examine lynchings throughout the entire United States, telling a reporter: "In this country, hundreds of communities have their acts of lynchings. Sometime significant is taking place here and across the country. It leads me to think that America at the grassroots level might be ready to finally face this history". In 2002, Rusk appeared in the documentary Strange Fruit about the poem/song Strange Fruit.

Inspired by the Truth and Reconciliation Commission in South Africa, Rusk founded the Southern Truth and Reconciliation Commission in 2003. Rusk's work with the Moore's Ford Memorial Committee brought him much media attention. In 2005, he was interviewed by the Globe and Mail newspaper, where he was quoted as saying about lynching: "It was terrorism. President [George W.] Bush wants us to take the war on terrorism seriously. We have to take a serious look at the terrorism waged on our own people in our history." The same story quoted a local businessman, Bob Marable, who called Rusk a "bleeding heart" whose efforts to commemorate the Moore's Ford lynching were a waste of time as he maintained that the real problems facing Afro-Americans were a high school drop-out rate and a high illegitimate birth rate. After the Hurricane Katrina disaster devastated New Orleans in 2005, Rusk worked as a volunteer building homes for the homeless. In 2006, he was interviewed by the Times of London. In 2008, he was interviewed in the documentary Murder in Black & White for his efforts to confront the past.

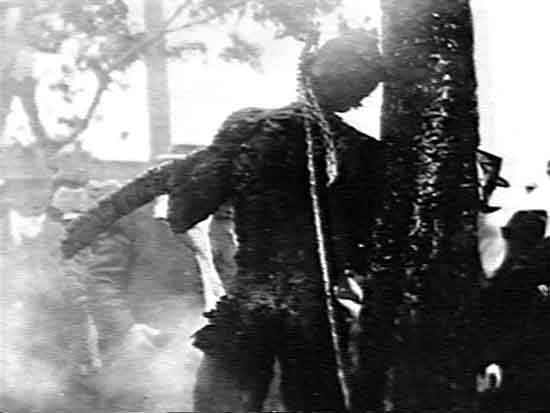
What was once Sam Hose, April 1899

In February 2007, Rusk was contacted by a group called Come to the Table in Newnan, Georgia that wanted to commentate the Lynching of Sam Hose in 1899. Rusk spoke to a journalist, Winston Skinner, from the Newnan Times-Herald about the Hose lynching. About the article, Rusk stated: "I expected they would run it inside the paper on the fifth or sixth page. Instead, it was a front page article. When I expressed my surprise, they told me anything to do with Sam Hose was a front page story". Rusk proposed a memorial service to honor Hose, saying: "We hope something good will come after so many years by paying our respects to Sam Hose". The article on 6 February 2007 started off a firestorm of controversy in Newnan, attracting a flood of highly negative letters to the editor calling the black man Hose a murderer and rapist who was justly lynched by the white community of Newnan. Rusk blamed Skinner for much of the backlash, noting that he had omitted the part in which he stated that Hose was probably innocent of raping a woman and her infant daughter and instead presented it as a fact that Hose was guilty of the crimes of which he was accused of. Skinner replied to Rusk that in Newnan it was accepted as fact that Hose was a murderer and rapist and it was disrespectful to the descendants of his alleged victims, the Cranford family, to present the story any other way.

To provide more debate, Rusk persuaded the editors of the Newnan Times-Herald to set up a section about the Hose lynching on the newspaper's website where he argued for Hose's innocence. Rusk in a letter to the editor of Newnan Times-Herald argued for a public discussion rather than a memorial service for Hose, writing: "One of the more unfortunate aspects of lynching in Georgia and elsewhere is that many of those killed were innocent of any crime. Hose may indeed be one of the exceptions. On several issues many of us can agree. One-whether innocent or guilty, no man deserved to die like Sam Hose. Number two-little lasting good will be achieved if any of the effort to revisit this horrific event in Newnan is cooked up primarily by 'outsiders'...Do wounds like Hose's killing really heal by leaving them alone? Or if unaddressed, do they just fester away?" Rusk drove to Newnan himself to meet with members of Come to the Table, where he argued that most of the white people in Newnan knew only a very biased version about the lynching of Hose and believed that the effort to honor him was a way to defame their town's reputation. Rusk also admitted that the backlash forced him to reconsider his own views about Hose's innocence, at least about the allegation that he had killed a white man. On 23 April 2007, Rusk spoke at a meeting at St. Paul's Episcopal Church in Newnan about the lynching. Rusk admitted the Hose lynching was different from the Moore's Ford lynching as Hose had no descendants to champion his memory while the Cranford family were still well respected and known in Newnan, making it more difficult to honor Hose as a victim of injustice.

In November 2007, Rusk led an investigation into a mass lynching in Watkinsville, Georgia in Oconee County where on 30 June 1905 nine men were dragged out of the local jail and eight were lynched (one man escaped). Of the eight men lynched, seven of the victims were black. In particular, Rusk wanted to place tombstones on their graves as reports from 1905 stated that the victims were simply dumped into a mass grave with no markers. Rusk told a journalist: “We’ve been working on Moore’s Ford since 1997, and we really haven’t done much at all about any of the other lynchings that have occurred in this area. But given the national exposure given to the lynching...we need to find out what the truth is.” About the reports of a mass grave, Rusk stated: “If it’s just a rumor, that needs to be run down and disclosed. We think that if it did happen, then surely there are some older residents of Oconee County who would know something.”

== Green activist ==
An enthusiastic fisherman, Rusk was active in the Oconee River Chapter of Trout Unlimited and in the Georgia Climate Change Coalition. Rusk came to believe that climate change was threatening the trout population of the rivers and streams of Georgia, and argued to protect one of Georgia's principal sources of tourism required action on climate change. Rusk stated that his father, shortly before his death in 1994, had told them that the climate change be the most important challenge facing the generations to come. In a 2015 newspaper essay, Rusk wrote that Dean Rusk told him a few weeks before his death: “Global warming will be THE issue for your generation. You need to get after it!” However, he went on to write that: "I adored my aging father, and that should have done it. But I did like everyone else: I kicked the climate can down the road for another 12 years. What finally got me involved? For this fly fisherman, it took trout dying in North Georgia streams and state hatcheries during the 2006–2007 droughts. They rolled up dead in low water and 85 degree stream temperatures. Something precious for me had to die before my very eyes.” Rusk told the American columnist Orlanod Montoya in 2017: "We weren't following it closely but during the 2006-2007 droughts we were witnessing mature trout floating up dead in that Nacoochee Bend section of the Chattahoochee, near Helen. Fish from the hatcheries were dying within 30-40 minutes of them being placed in those rivers, the superheated water. By God, that got us interested". Montoya wrote that most hunters and fishermen in Georgia tend to be very conservative and to live in rural areas, and he was surprised to see Rusk, the president of a local chapter of Trout Unlimited, agitating for action against climate change.

In 2011, Rusk protested the efforts of Republican Representative Paul Broun of Georgia, who became chairman of the House of Representatives' Science, Space and Technology Committee's subcommittee on investigation to hold hearings seeking to promote climate denialism. At the time, Rusk said of Broun's efforts that the effects of climate change were a reality, adding: "They're already here, and they'll be increasing. I suspect many people who are skeptical about climate change will live long enough to see the impacts and know how wrong they've been." As the man who founded the Georgia Climate Change Coalition in 2011, he constantly sought to pressure Georgia politicians both federal and state to do more on the climate change issue. On 24 September 2011, Rush told a journalist: "For us, trout are the canaries in the mining shaft. Fish dying in a recent North Georgia drought sends a message everywhere" The first action of the Georgia Climate Coalition was a rally on 23 September 2011 that saw the protesters march from the University of Georgia campus to downtown Athens.

On 24 April 2012, Rusk announced: "With its eclectic mix of faculty and students, researchers and activists, fly fishers and conservationists, GC3 and the Athens community are loaded with talent. Join with us as we grapple with these unsettling climate impacts and their huge threat to Georgia and the entire planet". Chris Wood, the CEO of Trout Unlimited, said of him: "He took on climate change in a state at a time when many of his own colleagues in Trout Unlimited wished he would just keep quiet, but that wasn’t in his DNA. He was a happy warrior. He did it armed with facts and he always appealed to our better angels. He was never angry. He was one of those people whose heart was sometimes bigger than his head and I absolutely loved him for that."

On 25 April 2014, Rusk was a speaker at a rally in Washington D.C to protest the approval of the Keystone pipeline, saying: "We see the impacts of pollution and climate change on our fish". Rusk stated that the fly fisherman of Georgia covered the political spectrum, but "...we'll stay together on climate issues like this". In November 2014, Rusk led a group of activists on a mass bicycle ride, the Bike Lanes to Stop the Pipe Lanes, to protest the plans to build the Sabal Trail Natural Gas Pipeline running from Alabama through Georgia to Florida. Rusk told a journalist: "It's gonna have tremendous impact on their lives, we older people have a huge responsibility to stop kicking that can down the road and get serious about climate change".

In 2018, Rusk committed suicide by driving his car off a bridge. In April 2018, Rusk together with the Georgia Climate Change Coalition were awarded the Alec Little Environmental Award.

== Articles and books ==
- Altschuler, Glenn; Kramnick, Issac (2014). Cornell: A History, 1940–2015. Ithaca: Cornell University Press. ISBN 978-0801444258.
- Arnold, Edwin (Winter–Spring 2008). "Across the Road from the Barbecue House". The Mississippi Quarterly. 61 (1/2): 267–292.
- Arnold, Edwin (2012). What Virtue There Is in Fire: Cultural Memory and the Lynching of Sam Hose. Atlanta: University of Georgia Press. ISBN 978-0820340647..
- Boose, Lynda (2014). "Techno-Masculinity and the 'Boy Eternal': From the Quagmire to the Gulf". In Miriam G. Cooke; Angela Woollacott (eds.). Gendering War Talk. Princeton: Princeton University Press. pp. 67–108. ISBN 978-1400863235..
- Cohen, Warren (June 1991). "New Light on Dean Rusk? A Review Essay". The Academy of Political Science. 106 (1): 123–128..
- Herring, George (Spring 1992). "Rusks on Rusk: A Georgian's Life as Collaborative Autobiography". The Georgia Historical Quarterly. 76 (1): 58–66..
- Pious, Richard (2008). Why Presidents Fail: White House Decision Making from Eisenhower to Bush II. Latham: Rowman & Littlefield Publishers. ISBN 978-0742563391.
- Pitch, Anthony S. (2016). The Last Lynching How a Gruesome Mass Murder Rocked a Small Georgia Town. New York: Skyhorse. ISBN 9781510701762.
- Shriver, Donald (2008). Honest Patriots: Loving a Country Enough to Remember Its Misdeeds. Oxford: Oxford University Press. ISBN 978-0199702602.
- Wexler, Laura (2013). Fire in a Canebrake: The Last Mass Lynching in America. New York: Simon and Schuster. ISBN 978-1439125298..
