= Lynching of Sam Hose =

African American who was lynched in the U.S.

- Part of the Nadir of American race relations
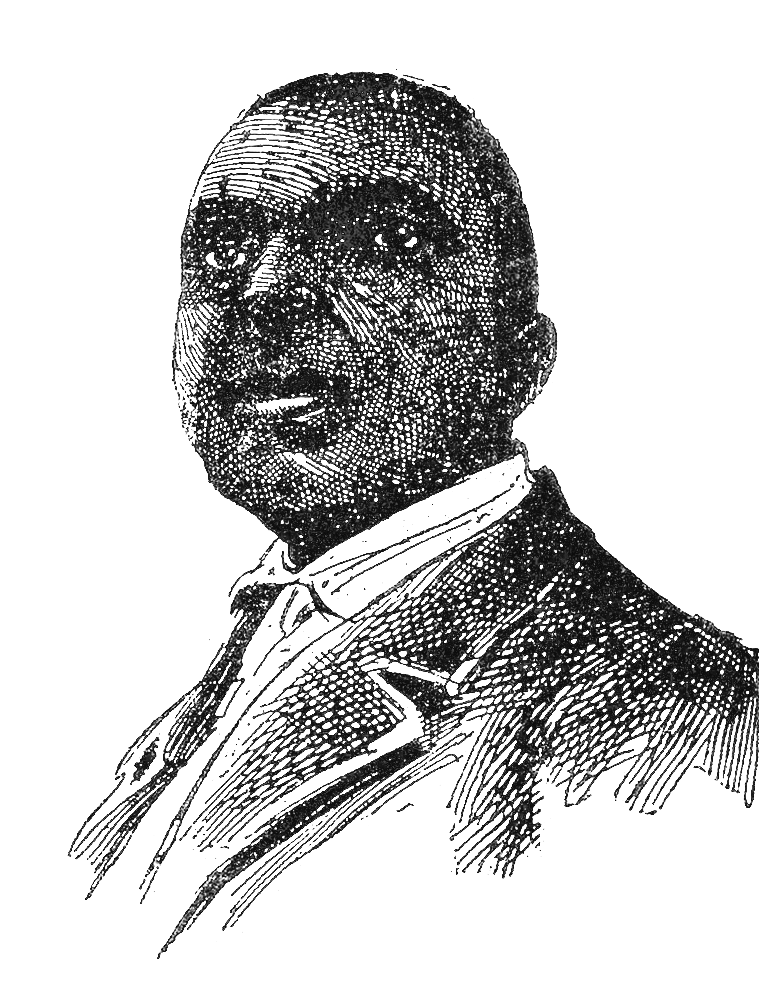
- Location: 33.392°N 84.802°W; Newnan, Coweta County, Georgia, U.S.
- Date: April 23, 1899; 2:30 PM (EST)
- Attack type: Lynching

Article in the Calhoun Times, April 27, 1899

Sam Hose (born Samuel Thomas Wilkes; c. 1875 – April 23, 1899) was an African American man who was tortured and murdered by a white lynch mob in Coweta County, Georgia, after being accused of rape and murder.

== Personal life ==
Sam Hose was born Tom Wilkes in south Georgia near Marshallville (Macon County), circa 1875. He grew up on a Macon County farm owned by the Jones family; the family had enslaved his mother. Hose was described by those who knew him as friendly and intelligent and, unusual for a Black man in the 19th century South, he learned how to read and write. Having to look after his aging mother and an intellectually disabled brother, he abandoned his plans for higher education and worked as a manual laborer. Newspaper accounts in 1899 said that Wilkes left Marshallville and used the alias Sam Hose because he had been accused of assaulting an elderly Black woman.

== Accusation ==
Wilkes moved to Coweta County, where he assumed the alias Sam Hose. On April 12, 1899, he was accused of murdering his employer, Alfred Cranford, after a heated argument. Hose had requested time off to visit his ailing mother. According to Hose, Alfred Cranford threatened to kill him and pointed a revolver at him. Hose was working at the time with an ax in his hands. Hose alleged that, due to the threat, he defended himself and threw the ax, killing Cranford. Hose fled the scene, and the search for him began shortly thereafter. Five cash rewards were offered for his capture, including from then-Governor Allen Candler, The Atlanta Constitution, Coweta County, the town of Palmetto, and Jacob Hass of Atlanta. Over the next few days, the furor was caused by rumors suggesting that Wilkes sexually assaulted Cranford's wife, Mattie Cranford, and assaulted his infant child. Newspapers portrayed Hose as "a monster in human form" who gleefully raped Mrs. Cranford and their infant child in front of the dying Mr. Cranford and, for good measure, claimed without evidence that Hose was suffering from advanced syphilis. Mrs. Cranford forever maintained that she had been raped by Hose, and her youngest son, Clifford Alfred "Tan" Cranford, was left blind in his left eye as a result of the injuries he received that day. On April 23, 1899, Hose was apprehended in Marshallville and returned by train to Coweta County.

== Following events ==
A mob kidnapped Hose from the train at gunpoint in Newnan, Georgia. Hose was marched to the Newnan jail, where a dispute arose between Hose's captors and the sheriff. The captors agreed to surrender Hose to the sheriff if they were paid their reward money. As the town jailer led Hose to a cell, the mob grew alarmed, held a pistol to the jailer's head, and took Hose away. Former Governor William Yates Atkinson and Judge Alvan Freeman pleaded with the crowd to release Hose to the custody of the authorities.

Ignoring their pleas, the crowd moved northward toward the Cranford home. The lynch mob grew, reaching an estimated 500 individuals, though some accounts purport around 2000. Once news of the capture reached Atlanta, large crowds boarded trains to Newnan. Mistakenly believing that these trains were loaded with troops, the mob stopped just north of Newnan, deciding they could wait no longer.

=== Lynching ===
Hose was brought to a patch of land known as the old Troutman field. Newspapers reported that members of the mob used knives to sever Hose's ears, fingers and genitals, while others plunged knives repeatedly into his body, to cheers from the mob. Men and boys gathered kindling from the nearby woods to create a pyre. The skin from Hose's face was removed, and he was doused with kerosene. He was then chained to a pine tree. Several matches were thrown onto the pyre by members of the mob, lighting it on fire and burning Hose alive. The heat from the fire caused Hose's veins to rupture, while his eyes nearly burst from their sockets. One journalist present noted the crowd watched "with unfeigned satisfaction" at contortions of Hose's body. As the flames consumed his body, Hose screamed out, "Oh my God! Oh Jesus!" From the time of Hose's first injuries to his death, almost 30 minutes passed. One woman thanked God for the actions of the mob. Some members of the mob cut off pieces of his dead body as souvenirs. Pieces of Hose's bones were sold for 25 cents, while his heart and liver were cut out to be sold.

None of the lynch mob wore masks and did not seek to hide their identities, giving their names to journalists who were present. On the tree where Hose had died, a sign was attached reading "We Must Protect Our Southern Women" One white Southern woman objected, a Mrs. P.H. Mell of Atlanta, who proudly noted in her letter to the editor of the Atlanta Constitution that she was a member of the Daughters of the Confederacy, and spoke of her horror about what was done to Hose, urging white women to protest the "unparalleled brutality" committed in the name of protecting them. Another woman, former slave owner and, later, first woman senator Rebecca Felton, wrote a letter protesting against Mell's letter, saying that any "true-hearted husband or father" would have done the same to the "beast" Hose, arguing that Hose needed to be killed in the same way that a mad dog needed to be put down, except "the dog is more worthy of sympathy."

According to Philip Dray's At the Hands of Persons Unknown: The Lynching of Black America, the noted civil rights leader and scholar W. E. B. Du Bois, who lived in Atlanta at the time, was on his way to a scheduled meeting with Atlanta Constitution editor Joel Chandler Harris to discuss the lynching when he was informed that Hose's knuckles were for sale in a grocery store on the road on which he was walking. He turned around and did not meet with Harris after learning this. Until then, Du Bois believed that lynching was an aberrant phenomenon and that he could use reason and a sense of fairness to appeal to the majority of the white community. The spectacular nature of Hose's lynching and the sale of body parts convinced him otherwise.

The governor of Georgia, Allen D. Candler, issued a statement calling the murder of Alfred Cranford "the most diabolical in the annals of crime" and blamed the entire Black community of Georgia. Candler complained the younger generation of Black people had not been so "lucky" to have experienced slavery while the older generation of Black people had failed to pass on the right values. Without presenting any proof, Candler argued that the entire Black community was responsible for Hose's actions and accused Black citizens of hiding and sheltering him during the manhunt. Candler ended his statement by saying that it was "deplorable" that Black people had protested the lynching of Hose.

The day after the lynching, on April 24, a mob pulled a black minister named Elijah Strickland from his home, cut his ears and one finger off, and hanged him for the alleged crime of paying Hose to kill Cranford.

Four days later, on April 27, a Black man named Mitchell Daniel was lynched by whites in Leesburg, Georgia, because he had complained about Sam Hose's lynching.

== Post-lynching investigation ==
The actions of the lynch mob made international news and condemned throughout most of the United States and Europe. A group of prominent citizens in Chicago, led by journalist and activist Ida B. Wells-Barnett, hired detective Louis P. Le Vin to investigate the Hose lynching. Le Vin's entire report was published in Chapter IV of Ida B. Wells-Barnett's article, Lynch Law in Georgia.

Le Vin stated that he spent over one week in his investigation. He concluded that Hose acted in self-defense, and whites added the rape allegation to incite a lynching. Le Vin stated that his conclusions were gathered from interviews with "persons he met in Griffin, Newman [sic], Atlanta and the vicinity." He does not provide the name of any individual who provided information, probably because they fear reprisals for speaking out publicly. He stated that he could not speak to Mattie Cranford because she "was still suffering from the awful shock." Le Vin's report stated, "that Wilkes killed Cranford there is no doubt, but under what circumstances can never be proven." Le Vin concluded his report with the statement, "I made my way home thoroughly convinced that a Negro's life is a very cheap thing in Georgia." In Lynch Law in Georgia, he stated:

The real purpose of these savage demonstrations is to teach the Negro that in the South, he has no rights that the law will enforce. Samuel Hose was burned to teach the Negroes that no matter what a white man does to them, they must not resist.

Historian Leon Litwack states, in Trouble In Mind: Black Southerners in the Age of Jim Crow, that during an investigation by a white detective, separate from the investigation organized by Wells-Barnett, Cranford's wife Mattie revealed that Hose had never entered the house, and had acted in self-defense against her husband.

== The memory of the lynching ==
In February 2007, Richard Rusk who had founded the Moore's Ford Memorial Committee to commemorate the Moore's Ford lynchings was contacted by a group called Come to the Table in Newnan, Georgia, that wanted to commemorate Hose's lynching. Rusk had led an effort to commemorate the Moore's Ford lynchings by applying for a Georgia historical marker to be placed at the site of the lynching. The Georgia Historical Society erected a historical marker in 1999, the first historical marker in Georgia—and one of the first in the country—to document a lynching. Come to the Table were hoping Rusk could help them do the same at the site of Hose's lynching. To raise public interest, Rusk spoke to a journalist, Winston Skinner, from the Newnan Times-Herald. Rusk later stated the article: "I expected they would run it inside the paper on the fifth or sixth page. Instead, it was a front-page article. When I expressed my surprise, they told me anything to do with Sam Hose was a front-page story".

Rusk suggested a memorial service to honor Hose: "We hope something good will come after so many years by paying our respects to Sam Hose." The article in the Newnan Times-Herald on February 6, 2007, started a firestorm of controversy in Newnan, attracting a flood of highly negative letters to the editor calling Hose a murderer and rapist who was justly lynched by the white community of Newnan. Rusk felt Skinner was responsible for the backlash, noting that he had omitted from the article the part in the interview which he stated that Hose was probably innocent and instead presented it as a fact that Hose was guilty of the crimes of which he was accused. In his article, Skinner wrote: "On 12th of April 1899, Hose hit his employer in the head with an ax, killing him. He then raped the landowner's wife and injured their infant child". Rusk felt that there were mitigating circumstances for Hose killing Cranford and that Hose was innocent of the charges of rape. In response, Skinner replied to Rusk that in Newnan, it was accepted that Hose was a murderer and rapist, and it was disrespectful to the Cranford family to present the story any other way.

Many white residents of Newnan wrote letters objecting to the memorial service, with one letter writer calling Rusk's proposed service "shameful." One letter writer wrote: "I am amazed there are plans to have a memorial service to show respect and honor Sam Hose, the man who raped and murdered his way across our country many years ago...The group proposing to hold this memorial service should be truly ashamed". One white woman wrote: "A man who is an ax murderer and a rapist, and whose crimes were described as some of the most violent, needs to be lynched. I don't care about race, sex, orientation, etc., etc. In fact, maybe if the judicial system actually punished crimes committed, there might be one person who thinks twice about crimes instead of looking forward to a cushy life in prison with three squares, cable TV, exercise equipment, libraries and steaks. Why doesn't this group not seek to honor someone who was just a good, decent person instead of someone who obviously got what he deserved?" Another letter writer wrote that while Hose did not receive fair treatment stated: "Lack of fair legal system treatment...is in no way an obligation to 'pay our respects to Sam Hose.' If we start paying respect to murderers and rapists, then we need to do the same for the late Jeffrey Dahmer, Ted Bundy, and John Wayne Gacey". Judge John Herbert Cranford, a descendant of Alfred Cranford, issued a public statement condemning the lynching, but also expressed much anger at Rusk for not paying enough attention to his family's suffering. One letter writer took a contrary position to the majority, saying the Moore's Ford Memorial Committee should be "commended" for its work, and concluded: "To ignore the past or sweep it under the rug is what keeps people from getting together in harmony and amity...The bottom line is that addressing an old wrong is the right thing to do".

Rusk, in a letter to the editor of the Newnan Times-Herald, argued for a public discussion rather than a memorial service for Hose, writing: "One of the more unfortunate aspects of lynching in Georgia and elsewhere is that many of those killed were innocent of any crime. Hose may indeed be one of the exceptions. On several issues, many of us can agree. No man deserved to die like Sam Hose, whether innocent or guilty. Number two—little lasting good will be achieved if any effort to revisit this horrific event in Newnan is cooked up primarily by 'outsiders'...Do wounds like Hose's killing really heal by leaving them alone? Or if unaddressed, do they just fester away?" Rusk drove to Newnan himself to meet with members of Come to the Table, where he argued that most of the white people in Newnan knew only a very biased version about the lynching of Hose and believed that the effort to honor him was a way to defame their town's reputation. On April 23, 2007, Rusk spoke at a meeting at St. Paul's Episcopal Church in Newnan about the lynching. In his speech, Rusk stated the Hose lynching was different from the Moore's Ford lynching as Hose had no descendants to champion his memory while the Cranford family were still well respected and known in Newnan, making it more difficult to honor Hose as a victim of injustice. The historian Edwin Arnold from Coweta County noted that, even today, there is no marker at the place where Hose was killed to commemorate the event.
