= Metze =

Metze is a German surname. Notable people with the surname include:

- Erich Metze (1909–1952), German professional cyclist
- Karin Metze (born 1956), German rower
- Marie Metze (born 1938), American politician

== See also ==
- Faule Metze, medieval supergun of the city of Brunswick, Germany
