= Dean Rusk =

American statesman (1909–1994)

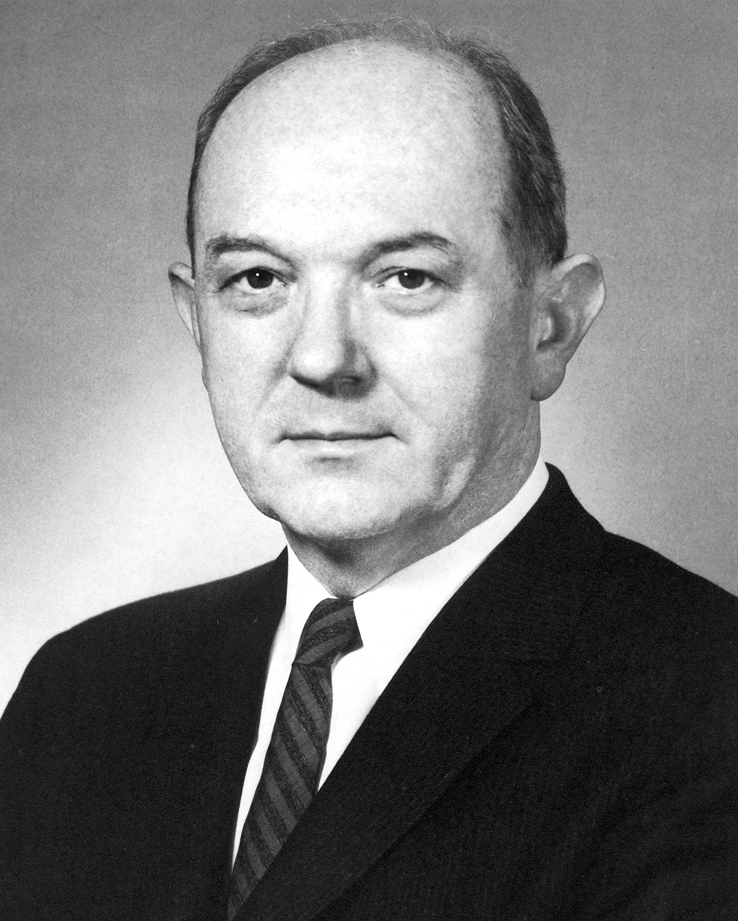
- Rusk c. 1960s

54th United States Secretary of State
- In office January 21, 1961 – January 20, 1969
- President: John F. Kennedy; Lyndon B. Johnson
- Under Secretary: Chester B. Bowles; George Ball; Nicholas Katzenbach
- Preceded by: Christian Herter
- Succeeded by: William P. Rogers

2nd Assistant Secretary of State for Far Eastern Affairs
- In office March 28, 1950 – December 9, 1951
- President: Harry S. Truman
- Preceded by: William Walton Butterworth
- Succeeded by: John Moore Allison

1st Assistant Secretary of State for International Organization Affairs
- In office February 9, 1949 – May 26, 1949
- President: Harry S. Truman
- Preceded by: Position established
- Succeeded by: John D. Hickerson

Personal details
- Born: David Dean Rusk; February 9, 1909 Cherokee County, Georgia, U.S.
- Died: December 20, 1994 (aged 85) Athens, Georgia, U.S.
- Resting place: Oconee Hill Cemetery
- Party: Democratic
- Spouse: Virginia Foisie (m. 1937)
- Children: 3, including David and Richard
- Education: Davidson College (BA); St John's College, Oxford (MA); University of California, Berkeley (LLB)

Military service
- Allegiance: United States
- Branch/service: United States Army
- Years of service: 1940–1946
- Rank: Colonel
- Battles/wars: World War II; Second Sino-Japanese War; Burma campaign; Operation Blacklist Forty
- Awards: Legion of Merit

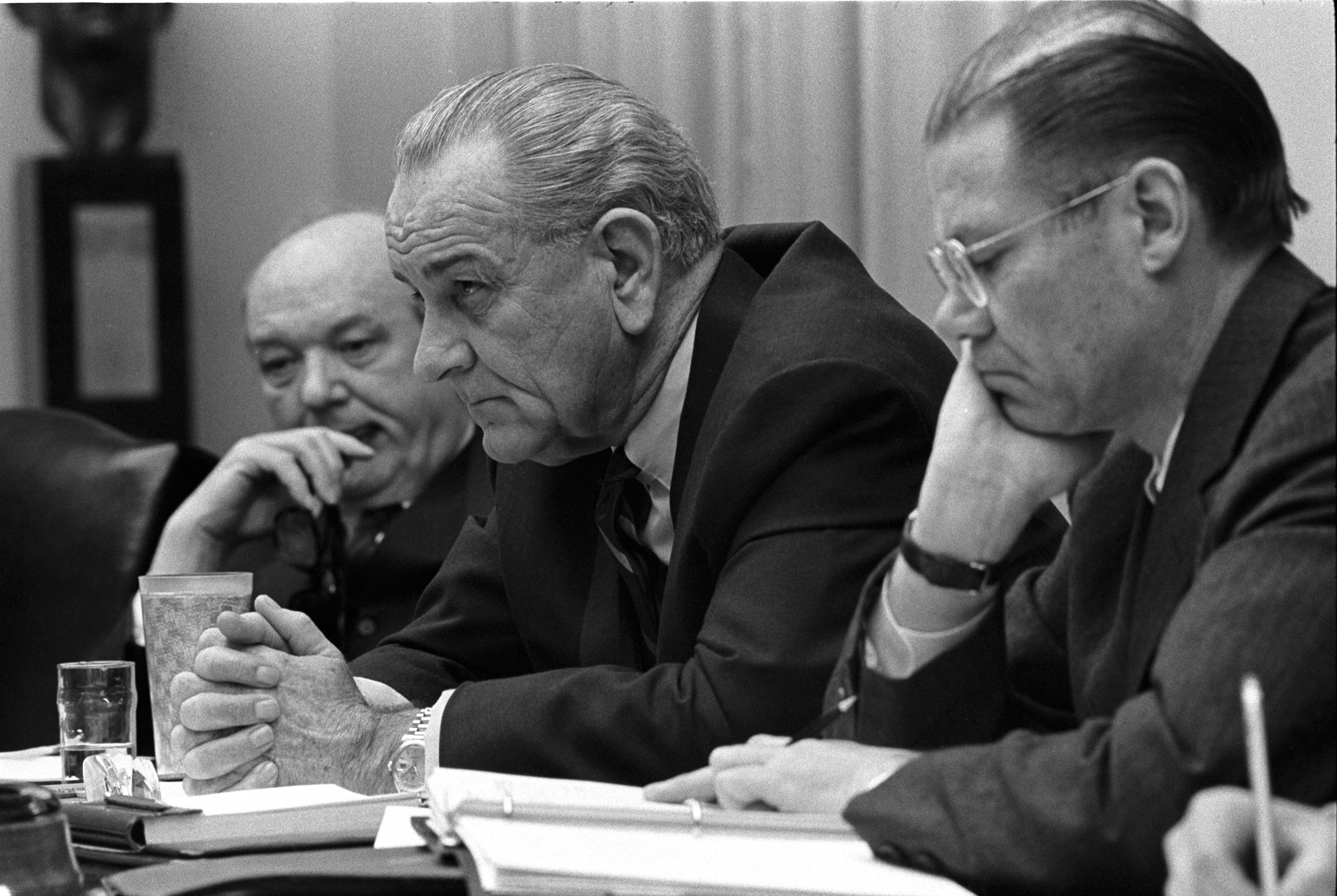
Dean Rusk with President Johnson and Robert McNamara, February 9, 1968

David Dean Rusk (February 9, 1909 – December 20, 1994) was the United States secretary of state from 1961 to 1969 under presidents John F. Kennedy and Lyndon B. Johnson, the second-longest serving secretary of state after Cordell Hull from the Franklin Roosevelt administration. He had been a high government official in the 1940s and early 1950s, as well as the head of a leading foundation.

Born to a poor farm family in Cherokee County, Georgia, on February 9, 1909, Rusk graduated from Davidson College and was a Rhodes scholar at St John's College, Oxford, where he immersed himself in English history and customs. After teaching at Mills College in California, he became an army officer during World War II. He served as a staff officer in the China Burma India Theater, becoming a senior aide to Joseph Stilwell, the top American general. As a civilian, he became a senior official in 1945 at the State Department, rising to the number three position under Dean Acheson. He became Assistant Secretary of State for Far Eastern Affairs in 1950. In 1952, Rusk left to become president of the Rockefeller Foundation.

After Kennedy won the 1960 presidential election, he asked Rusk to serve as secretary of state. Rusk was a quiet advisor to Kennedy, rarely making his own views known to other officials. He supported diplomatic efforts during the Cuban Missile Crisis, and though he initially expressed doubts about the escalation of the U.S. role in the Vietnam War, he became known as one of its strongest supporters. Asked to stay on by President Lyndon Johnson after Kennedy's assassination in 1963, Rusk was known to be a favorite of Johnson's. He left the secretary role in January 1969, and taught international relations at the University of Georgia School of Law.

== Childhood and education ==
David Dean Rusk was born in rural Cherokee County, Georgia. The Rusk ancestors had emigrated from Northern Ireland around 1795. His father Robert Hugh Rusk (1868–1944) had attended Davidson College and Louisville Theological Seminary. He left the ministry to become a cotton farmer and schoolteacher. Rusk's mother Elizabeth Frances Clotfelter was of Swiss descent. She had graduated from public school and was a schoolteacher. When Rusk was four years old, the family moved to Atlanta, where his father worked for the U.S. Post Office. Rusk came to embrace the stern Calvinist work ethic and morality.

Like most white Southerners, his family was Democratic; young Rusk's hero was President Woodrow Wilson, the first Southern president since the Civil War era. The experience of poverty made him sympathetic to Black Americans. As a 9-year-old, Rusk attended a rally in Atlanta where President Wilson called on the United States to join the League of Nations. Rusk grew up on the mythology and legends of the "Lost Cause" so common to the South, and he came to embrace the militarism of Southern culture as he wrote in a high-school essay that "young men should prepare themselves for service in case our country ever got into trouble." At the age of 12, Rusk had joined the Reserve Officers' Training Corps (ROTC), whose training duties he took very seriously. Rusk had an intense reverence for the military and throughout his later career, he was inclined to accept the advice of generals.

He was educated in Atlanta's public schools, and graduated from Boys High School in 1925, spending two years working for an Atlanta lawyer before working his way through Davidson College, a Presbyterian school in North Carolina. He was active in the national military honor society Scabbard and Blade, becoming a cadet lieutenant colonel commanding the ROTC battalion. He graduated Phi Beta Kappa in 1931. While at Davidson, Rusk applied the Calvinist work ethic to his studies. He won a Rhodes Scholarship to Oxford University. Rusk studied international relations, taking an MA in PPE (Politics, Philosophy and Economics). He immersed himself in English history, politics, and popular culture, making lifelong friends among the British elite. Rusk's rise from poverty made him a passionate believer in the "American Dream", and a recurring theme throughout his life was his oft-expressed patriotism, a place in which he believed that anyone, no matter how modest their circumstances, could rise up to live the "American Dream".

Rusk married Virginia Foisie (October 5, 1915 – February 24, 1996) on June 9, 1937. They had three children: David, Richard, and Peggy Rusk.

Rusk taught at Mills College in Oakland, California, from 1934 to 1949 (except during his military service), and he earned an LL.B. degree at the University of California, Berkeley School of Law in 1940.

== Career prior to 1961 ==
While studying in England as a Rhodes scholar at St. John's College, Oxford, he received the Cecil Peace Prize in 1933. Rusk's experiences of the events of the early 1930s decisively shaped his later views, as he told Karnow in an interview:

I was a senior in college the year that the Japanese seized Manchuria and I have the picture still etched in my mind from the newsreel of the Chinese ambassador standing before the League of Nations, pleading for help against the Japanese attack. I myself was present in the Oxford Union on that night in 1933, when they passed the motion that "this house will not fight for king and country" ...
So one cannot have lived through those years and not have some pretty strong feelings ... that it was the failure of the governments of the world to prevent aggression that made the catastrophe of World War II inevitable.

=== Military in Southeast Asia ===
During the 1930s, Rusk served in the Army reserves. He was called to active duty in December 1940 as a captain. He served as a staff officer in the China Burma India Theater. During the war, Rusk had authorized an air drop of arms to the Viet Minh guerrillas in Vietnam commanded by his future enemy Ho Chi Minh. At war's end, he was a colonel, decorated with the Legion of Merit with Oak Leaf Cluster.

=== State Department 1945–1953 ===
Rusk returned to America to work briefly for the War Department in Washington, DC. He joined the Department of State in February 1945, and worked for the office of United Nations Affairs. In the same year, he suggested splitting Korea into spheres of U.S. and of Soviet influence at the 38th parallel north. After Alger Hiss left State in January 1947, Rusk succeeded him (as director of the Office of Special Political Affairs), according to Max Lowenthal.

Rusk was a supporter of the Marshall Plan and of the United Nations. In 1948, he supported the Secretary of State George Marshall in advising Truman against recognizing Israel, fearing it would damage relations with oil-rich Arab states like Saudi Arabia, but was overruled by Truman's legal counsel, Clark Clifford, who persuaded the president to recognize Israel. When Marshall was asked to explain why he did not resign over the recognition of Israel, he replied that the secretary of state did not resign over decisions made by the president who had the ultimate control of foreign policy. Rusk, who admired Marshall, supported his decision and always quoted the remark made by Truman: "The president makes the foreign policy". In 1949, he was made deputy Undersecretary of State under Dean Acheson, who had replaced Marshall as secretary of state.

=== Assistant secretary of state for Far Eastern affairs ===
In 1950, Rusk was made assistant secretary of state for Far Eastern affairs, at his own request, arguing that he knew Asia the best. He played an influential part in the US decision to become involved in the Korean War, and in Japan's postwar compensation for victorious countries, as shown in the Rusk documents. Rusk was a cautious diplomat and always sought international support. Rusk favored support for Asian nationalist movements, arguing that European imperialism was doomed in Asia, but the Atlanticist Acheson favored closer relations with the European powers, which precluded American support for Asian nationalism. Rusk dutifully declared it was his duty to support Acheson.

==== French Indochina ====
When question arose as to whether the United States should support France in maintaining control over Indochina against the Communist Viet Minh guerrillas, Rusk argued for support of the French government, stating that the Viet Minh were just the instruments of Soviet expansionism in Asia and to refuse to support the French would amount to appeasement. Under strong American pressure, the French granted nominal independence to the State of Vietnam in February 1950 under the Emperor Bao Dai, which the United States recognized within days. However, it was widely known that the State of Vietnam was still in effect a French colony as French officials controlled all of the important ministries and the Emperor bitterly remarked to the press: "What they call a Bao Dai solution turns out to be just a French solution." In June 1950, Rusk testified before the Senate Foreign Relations Committee: "This is a civil war that has been in effect captured by the [Soviet] Politburo and, besides, has been turned into a tool of the Politburo. So it isn't a civil war in the usual sense. It is part of the international war ... We have to look at in terms of which side we are on in this particular kind of struggle ... Because Ho Chi Minh is tied with the Politburo, our policy is to support Bao Dai and the French in Indochina until we have time to help them establish a going concern."

==== Korean War ====
In April 1951, Truman sacked General Douglas MacArthur as the commander of the American forces in Korea over the question about whether to carry the war into China. At the time, the chairman of the Joint Chiefs of Staff, General Omar Bradley, called war with China "the wrong war, at the wrong place, at the wrong time, and with the wrong enemy". In May 1951, Rusk gave a speech at a dinner sponsored by the China Institute in Washington, which he had not submitted to the State Department in advance, where he implied the United States should unify Korea under Syngman Rhee and should overthrow Mao Zedong in China. Rusk's speech attracted more attention than he expected, as the columnist Walter Lippmann ran a column reading "Bradley vs. Rusk", accusing Rusk of advocating a policy of unconditional surrender in the Korean war. For embarrassing Acheson, Rusk was forced to resign and went into the private sector as the director of the Rockefeller Foundation. Regarding the U.S. bombing strategy in the Korean War, Rusk said that the United States bombed "everything that moved in North Korea, every brick standing on top of another."

=== Rockefeller Foundation ===
Rusk and his family moved to Scarsdale, New York, while he served as a Rockefeller Foundation trustee from 1950 to 1961. In 1952, he succeeded Chester L. Barnard as president of the foundation.

== Secretary of State ==
=== Selection ===
On December 12, 1960, Democratic President-elect John F. Kennedy nominated Rusk to be Secretary of State. Rusk was not Kennedy's first choice; his first choice, J. William Fulbright, proved too controversial. David Halberstam also described Rusk as "everybody's number two". Rusk had recently written an article titled "The President" in Foreign Affairs calling for the president to direct foreign policy with the secretary of state as a mere adviser, which had Kennedy's interest after it was pointed out to him. After deciding that Fulbright's support for segregation disqualified him, Kennedy summoned Rusk for a meeting, where he himself endorsed Fulbright as the man best qualified to be Secretary of State. Rusk himself was not particularly interested in running the State Department as the annual pay for secretary of state was $25,000 while his job as director of the Rockefeller Foundation paid $60,000 per year. Rusk only agreed to take the position out of a sense of patriotism after Kennedy insisted that he take the job.

Kennedy biographer Robert Dallek explained Rusk's choice thus:

By process of elimination, and determined to run foreign policy from the White House, Kennedy came to Dean Rusk, the president of the Rockefeller Foundation. Rusk was an acceptable last choice, with the right credentials and the right backers. A Rhodes scholar, a college professor, a World War II officer, an Assistant Secretary of State for the Far East under Truman, a liberal Georgian sympathetic to integration, and a consistent Stevenson supporter, Rusk offended no one. The foreign policy establishment — Acheson, Lovett, liberals Bowles and Stevenson, and The New York Times — all sang his praises. But most of all, it was clear to Kennedy from their one meeting in December 1960 that Rusk would be a sort of faceless, faithful bureaucrat who would serve rather than attempt to lead.

Kennedy tended to address Rusk as "Mr. Rusk" instead of Dean.

Rusk took charge of a department he knew well when it was half the size. It now employed 23,000 people including 6,000 Foreign Service officers and had diplomatic relations with 98 countries. He had faith in the use of military action to combat communism. Despite private misgivings about the Bay of Pigs invasion, he remained noncommittal during the executive council meetings leading up to the attack and never opposed it outright. Early in his tenure, he had strong doubts about US intervention in Vietnam, but later his vigorous public defense of US actions in the Vietnam War made him a frequent target of anti-war protests. Just as he had under the Truman administration, Rusk tended to favor hawkish line towards Vietnam and frequently allied himself in debates in the Cabinet and on the National Security Council with equally hawkish Defense Secretary Robert McNamara.

=== Vietnam and Laos ===
Against the criticism made by Edward Lansdale of the embassy in Saigon, Rusk defended the performance of the State Department, saying South Vietnam was a difficult assignment. On 9 March 1961, the communist Pathet Lao won a notable victory on the Plains of Jars, and for a moment the Pathet Lao seemed on the verge of seizing all of Laos. Rusk expressed considerable disgust when he learned that neither side in the Lao civil war fought very hard, citing a report that both sides had broken off combat to go celebrate a water festival for ten days before resuming their battle. Rusk, who had much experience of Southeast Asia during World War Two, expressed much doubt if bombing alone would stop the Pathet Lao, saying it was his experience that bombing only worked with ground troops to hold the ground or advance.

=== Military plans ===
The Undersecretary of State, Chester Bowles, wrote to Rusk in late March 1961, saying he heard rumors that Cuban emigres were being trained by the CIA for an invasion of Cuba, which he asked Rusk to stop, saying it was against the rules of the Organization of American States. Rusk did not pass on the memo to Kennedy nor did he himself speak out against the Bay of Pigs invasion, even when his own military experience had convinced him that a single brigade "did not stand a snowball's chance in hell" of toppling's Cuba's government.

In April 1961, when a proposal to send 100 more American military advisers to South Vietnam to make a total of 800 appeared before Kennedy, Rusk argued for acceptance even as he noted that it violated the Geneva Accords of 1954 (which the United States had not signed, but promised to abide by), which limited the number of foreign military personnel in Vietnam to 700 at a time. Rusk stated that International Control Commission consisting of diplomats from India, Poland and Canada which was supposed to enforce the Geneva Accords should not be informed of the deployment and the advisers "be placed in varied locations to avoid attention". Rusk favored a hawkish line on Laos. Kennedy decided otherwise, on the grounds that Laos had no modern airfields and there was a risk of Chinese intervention. Rusk opened the Geneva conference on neutralizing Laos and predicted to Kennedy that the negotiations would fail.

Rusk continued his Rockefeller Foundation interest in aiding developing nations and also supported low tariffs to encourage world trade.

=== USS Liberty incident ===
Rusk drew the ire of supporters of Israel after he let it be known that he believed the USS Liberty incident was a deliberate attack on the ship, rather than an accident. He was very outspoken about his views on the attack: “Accordingly, there is every reason to believe that the USS Liberty was or should have been identified, or at least her nationality determined, prior to the attack. In these circumstances, the later military attack by Israeli aircraft on the USS Liberty is quite literally incomprehensible. As a minimum, the attack must be condemned as an act of military irresponsibility reflecting reckless disregard for human life. The subsequent attack by Israeli torpedo boats, substantially after the vessel was or should have been identified by Israeli military forces, manifests the same reckless disregard for human life. At the time of the attack, the USS Liberty was flying the American flag and its identification was clearly indicated in large white letters and numerals on its hull. It was broad daylight and the weather conditions were excellent. Experience demonstrates that both the flag and the identification number of the vessel were readily visible from the air. At a minimum, the attack must be condemned as an act of military recklessness reflecting wanton disregard for human life. The silhouette and conduct of the USS Liberty readily distinguished it from any vessel that could have been considered as hostile. The USS Liberty was peacefully engaged, posed no threat whatsoever to the torpedo boats, and obviously carried no armament affording it a combat capability. It could and should have been scrutinized visually at close range before torpedoes were fired.” In 1990, he wrote, “I was never satisfied with the Israeli explanation. Their sustained attack to disable and sink Liberty precluded an assault by accident or by some trigger-happy local commander. Through diplomatic channels we refused to accept their explanations. I didn't believe them then, and I don't believe them to this day. The attack was outrageous.”

After an Israeli claim appeared in The Washington Post that they had inquired about the presence of U.S. ships in the area before the attack, Rusk telegrammed the U.S. embassy in Tel Aviv and demanded “urgent confirmation.” U.S. Ambassador to Israel Walworth Barbour confirmed that Israel's story was bogus: “No request for info on U.S. ships operating off Sinai was made until after Liberty incident. Had Israelis made such an inquiry it would have been forwarded immediately to the chief of naval operations and other high naval commands and repeated to dept.”

=== Asian affairs ===
On March 24, 1961, Rusk released a brief statement saying his delegation was to travel to Bangkok and the SEATO nations' responsibility should be considered if peace settlements were not realized. In 1961, Rusk disapproved of the Indian invasion of Goa, which he regarded as an act of aggression against NATO ally Portugal, but was overruled by Kennedy who wanted to improve relations with India and who also noted the Portuguese had no other option but to be allied to the United States. Earlier in 1961, a major rebellion had broken out in the Portuguese colony of Angola, which increased Portugal's reliance upon its largest supplier of arms, the United States. In regards to the West New Guinea dispute about the Netherlands New Guinea, Rusk favored supporting the NATO ally Netherlands against Indonesia as he saw Sukarno as pro-Chinese. Rusk accused Indonesia of aggression by attacking the Dutch forces in New Guinea in 1962 and believed that Sukarno had violated the United Nations charter, but was again overruled by Kennedy. In a case of realpolitik, Kennedy argued the Dutch had no choice, but to be allied with the United States, meaning they could be taken for granted whereas he was highly concerned that Indonesia, which he called "the most significant nation in Southeast Asia", might become communist. To improve relations with Sukarno, Kennedy decided to support the Indonesian claim to Dutch New Guinea; Rusk later wrote he felt "queasy" about the way that Kennedy sacrificed the Dutch to win over Indonesia and had strong doubts that the "consultation" scheduled to determine the future of the territory in 1969 would be a free and fair one.

=== Middle East ===
President Nasser of Egypt was regarded as a trouble-maker in Washington owing to Egypt's alliance with the Soviet Union and his plans for a pan-Arab state that would of necessity require overthrowing the governments of every Arab state, most notably American allies such as Saudi Arabia. In the Arab Cold War between Egypt and Saudi Arabia, Rusk favored the latter. However, at the same time, Rusk argued to Kennedy to Nasser was a spoiler who wanted to play off the Soviet Union against the United States to get the best possible bargain for Egypt, and if he leaned in a pro-Soviet direction, it was because the United States refused to sell Egypt arms out of the fear that they might be used against Israel whereas the Soviets by contrast were willing to sell Egyptians any arms they wanted short of nuclear weapons. Rusk noted the United States still had significant leverage over Egypt in the form of the PL 480 law that allowed the United States to sell surplus American agricultural production to any "friendly nation" in the local currency instead of U.S. dollars. In Egypt, the government subsidized the sale of staple foods like bread at cost or below cost prices, and Egypt's growing population, which outstripped the capacity of Egypt's agriculture, required Egypt to import food. Nasser had become very dependent upon the PL 480 food sales to provide food at cost to his people, and moreover the Soviet Union could not hope to match America's food sales to Egypt. Nasser argued in exchange for PL 480 food sales that he would not start a war with Israel, saying for that for all his fiery speeches he promised to keep the Arab-Israeli dispute "in the icebox". Rusk argued that to Kennedy and later Johnson that they should resist congressional pressure to end the PL 480 food sales to Egypt, stating that ending the PL 480 sales would only push Nasser closer to the Soviet Union and end the leverage that kept the peace between Egypt and Israel. When Nasser sent 70,000 Egyptian troops into Yemen in September 1962 to support the republican government against the royalist guerrillas supported by Saudi Arabia, Rusk approved of increased arm sales to Saudi Arabia, which were an indirect way of supporting the Yemeni royalists. In common with decision-makers in Washington, Rusk felt that the United States had to support Saudi Arabia against Egypt, but he advised Kennedy against pushing Nasser too hard, saying that it would only drive him closer to the Soviet Union. On October 8, 1962, a "Food for Peace" deal was signed with Egypt under the United States committed itself to sell at cost $390 million worth of wheat to Egypt for the next three years. By 1962, Egypt imported 50% of its wheat consumed from the United States and owing to the PL 480 law was some $180 million per year at a time when Egypt's foreign reserves were almost deleted owing to a heavy level of military spending. In May 1963, out of anger at being trapped in the quagmire of fighting a guerrilla war in Yemen, Nasser ordered Egyptian Air Force squadrons in Yemen to start bombing towns in Saudi Arabia. With Egypt and Saudi Arabia on the brink of war, Kennedy decided with the support of Rusk to throw America's weight on the side of Saudi Arabia. Kennedy quietly dispatched several U.S. Air Force squadrons to Saudi Arabia and warned Nasser that if he attacked Saudi Arabia, the United States would go to war with Egypt. The American warning had its effect and Nasser decided that discretion was the better part of valor. Despite all the tension in American-Egyptian relations, Rusk still argued that it was better to keep the PL 480 food sales to Egypt going than to end them, maintaining keeping the Arab-Israeli dispute "in the icebox" as Nasser phrased it depended upon the United States having leverage over Egypt.

=== Cuba ===
During the Cuban Missile Crisis he supported diplomatic efforts. A careful review by Sheldon Stern, Head of the JFK Library, of Kennedy's audio recordings of the EXCOMM meetings suggests that Rusk's contributions to the discussions probably averted a nuclear war.

=== Overthrow of Vietnam President Diem ===
In August 1963, a series of misunderstandings rocked the Kennedy administration when, in reaction to the Buddhist crisis, a policy proposal urging the overthrow of President Diem of South Vietnam was presented to Kennedy. He stated he would consider adopting it if Rusk gave his approval first. Rusk, who had gone to New York to attend a session of the United Nations, cautiously gave approval out of the impression that Kennedy had approved it first. When it emerged that was not the case, Kennedy assembled his foreign policy team for a stormy meeting at the White House, with several, such as McNamara, Vice President Lyndon Johnson, and CIA director John McCone, all speaking for standing with Diem, while others like the Undersecretary of State George W. Ball, W. Averell Harriman and Roger Hilsman argued for deposing Diem. Much to Kennedy's annoyance, Rusk maintained a stony silence, refusing to take a side. At the end of the meeting, Kennedy exclaimed: "My God, my government is falling apart!" On August 31, 1963, the diplomat Paul Kattenburg reported from Saigon that public opinion in South Vietnam was overwhelmingly hostile to Diem, which led him to suggest it was time "for us to get out honorably". All of the assembled officials rejected Kattenburg's idea, with Rusk saying "we will not pull out ... until the war is won." Rusk reassigned Kattenburg from South Vietnam to Guyana.

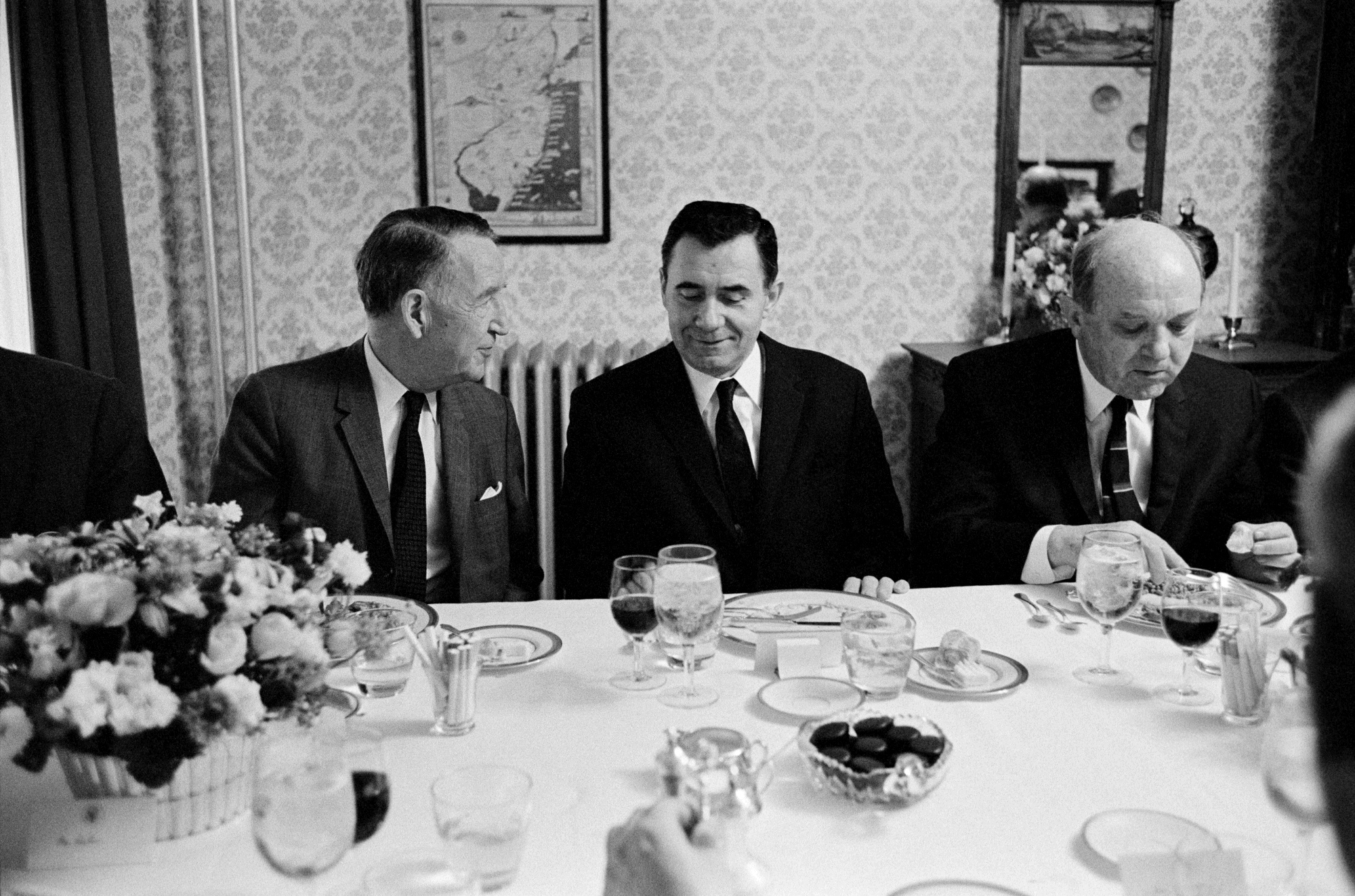
L–R: Llewellyn Thompson, Soviet Foreign Minister Andrei Gromyko and Rusk in 1967 during the Glassboro Summit Conference

=== Poor relationship with President Kennedy ===
As he recalled in his autobiography, As I Saw It, Rusk did not have a good relationship with President Kennedy. The president was often irritated by Rusk's reticence in advisory sessions and felt that the State Department was "like a bowl of jelly" and that it "never comes up with any new ideas". In 1963, Newsweek ran a cover story on the National Security Adviser McGeorge Bundy under the title "Cool Head for the Cold War". The author of the story wrote that Rusk "was not known for his force and decisiveness" and asserted that Bundy was "the real Secretary of State". Special counsel to the president Ted Sorensen believed that Kennedy, being well versed and practiced in foreign affairs, acted as his own secretary of state. Sorensen also said that the president often expressed impatience with Rusk and felt him under-prepared for emergency meetings and crises. As Rusk recounted in his autobiography, he repeatedly offered his resignation, but it was never accepted. Rumors of Rusk's dismissal leading up to the 1964 election abounded prior to President Kennedy's trip to Dallas in 1963. Shortly after Kennedy was assassinated, Rusk offered his resignation to the new president, Lyndon B. Johnson. However, Johnson liked Rusk and refused his resignation. He remained secretary throughout Johnson's administration.

=== Defending South Vietnam ===
In June 1964, Rusk met with Hervé Alphand, the French ambassador in Washington, to discuss a French plan for neutralization of both Vietnams, a plan which Rusk was skeptical about. Rusk told Alphand: "To us, the defense of South Vietnam has the same significance as the defense of Berlin." In response, Alphand stated: "The loss of Berlin would shake the foundations of Western security. On the other hand, if we were to lose South Vietnam, we would not be losing much." By contrast, Rusk argued that the Berlin issue and the Vietnam war were all part of the same struggle against the Soviet Union and the United States could not falter anywhere.

=== Distrusting Robert Kennedy ===
Rusk quickly became one of Johnson's favorite advisers, and just before the Democratic National Convention the two had a discussion about Attorney General Robert F. Kennedy, who was angling to be Johnson's running mate, much to the president's discomfort. Both Johnson and Rusk agreed that Kennedy was "freakishly ambitious" with an obsessive desire to one day be president. Rusk told Johnson: "Mr. President, I just can't wrap my mind around that kind of ambition. I don't know how to understand it."

=== Vietnam in 1964 ===
Just after the Gulf of Tonkin incident, Rusk supported the Gulf of Tonkin resolution. On August 29, 1964, amid the ongoing presidential election, Rusk called for bipartisan support to ensure that the US's foreign policy have both consistency and reliability and said Republican presidential nominee Barry Goldwater was creating "mischief". The following month, at a September 10 press conference in the main auditorium of the State Department, Rusk said that Senator Goldwater's critiques "reflect a basic lack of understanding" of a U.S. President's handling of conflict and peace.

On September 7, 1964, Johnson assembled his national security team to seek a consensus about what to do about Vietnam. Rusk advised caution, arguing that Johnson should embark on military measures only after diplomacy had been exhausted. In September 1964, Rusk grew frustrated with the endless infighting amongst South Vietnam's junta of generals and after a failed coup d'état against Nguyễn Khánh sent a message to Maxwell Taylor, the ambassador in Saigon, on September 14, stating he was to "make it emphatically clear" to Khánh and the rest of the junta that Johnson was tired of the infighting. Rusk also instructed Taylor to say: "The United States has not provided massive assistance to South Vietnam, in military equipment, economic resources, and personnel in order to subsidize continuing quarrels among South Vietnamese leaders." Reflecting the general vexation with South Vietnam's chronic political instability in Washington, Rusk argued to Johnson: "Somehow we must change the pace at which these people move, and I suspect that this can only be done with a pervasive intrusion of Americans into their affairs." Increasingly, the feeling in Washington was if South Vietnam could not defeat the Viet Cong guerrillas on its own, the Americans would have to step in and win the war that the South Vietnamese had proved incapable of winning. On September 21, Rusk said the US would not be pushed out of the Gulf of Tonkin and that the prevention of it becoming a "communist lake" would be assured by the continued presence of American forces there.

In September 1964, a peace initiative was launched by the UN Secretary General U Thant who tried to set up secret peace talks in his native Burma, which were supported by the Soviet leader Nikita Khrushchev who pressured Ho Chi Minh to take part in the projected peace talks, saying he would only increase Soviet aid to North Vietnam if the North Vietnamese took part in a diplomatic effort to end the war first. U Thant reported to Rusk that the Soviet pressure seemed to be working as North Vietnam's other arms supplier, China, could not match the hi-tech weaponry that only the Soviet Union could supply. Rusk did not press on this information on Johnson, saying to take part in the planned talks in Burma would have signaled "the acceptance or the confirmation of aggression". In October, the peace initiative was ended by Khrushchev being ousted and his successor, Leonid Brezhnev, was not interested in U Thant's plan.

On 1 November 1964, the Viet Cong attacked the American airbase at Bien Hoa, killing 4 Americans. Rusk told Ambassador Taylor that with the elections occurring in less than 48 hours, Johnson did not want to act, but after the election there would be "a more systematic campaign of military pressure on the North with all implications we have always seen in their course of action".

=== Nasser ===
On December 23, 1964, Nasser decided to up the ante in his relations with the United States by delivering a violently anti-American speech in Port Said in which he called Iran "an American and Zionist colony" and claimed Johnson wanted to reduce Egypt to the status of Iran. Through Nasser was hoping that his speech might force the United States to reduce military aid to Saudi Arabia, it had the opposite effect. Johnson, who was more pro-Israeli than Kennedy had been, was furious with the speech. Rusk later recalled: "We didn't expect Nasser to bow, scrape, lick our boots, and say 'Thank you Uncle Sam', but we did expect to at least moderate his virulent criticism of the United States. Instead, he got up in front of those big crowds in Cairo and shouted such things as 'Throw your aid into the Red Sea!'" On January 5, 1965, Johnson suspended all PL 480 aid to Egypt, an action that immediately plunged the Egyptian economy into a crisis. Nasser realized what he had done and began to lobby for the resumption of PL 480 food sales, but got nowhere. Though Nasser knew the best way of ending the crisis was to pull out of Yemen and seek a rapprochement with Saudi Arabia and the United States, he instead turned towards the Soviet Union to seek support for the rapidly contracting Egyptian economy.

=== Robert Kennedy undercuts Rusk ===
In April 1965, Senator Robert Kennedy during a visit to the White House advised Johnson to sack Rusk and replace him with Bill Moyers. Johnson at first thought this was a joke, saying that Kennedy's brother had appointed him Secretary of State, and was astonished to learn that Kennedy was serious. The president replied: "I like Bill Moyers, but I'm not about to remove Rusk."

=== Vietnam in 1965 ===
In May 1965, Rusk told Johnson that the "Four Points" presented by the North Vietnam premier Dong as peace terms were deceptive because "the third of those four points required the imposition of the National Liberation Front on all South Vietnam". In June 1965, when General William Westmoreland requested of Johnson 180, 000 troops to Vietnam, Rusk argued to Johnson that the United States had to fight in Vietnam to maintain "the integrity of the U.S. commitment" throughout the world, but also wondered aloud if Westermoreland was exaggerating the extent of the problems in South Vietnam in order to have more troops under his command. However, despite his doubts about Westmoreland Rusk in a rare memo to the president warned that if South Vietnam were lost "the Communist world would draw conclusions that would lead to our ruin and almost certainly to a catastrophic war". At another meeting, Rusk stated the United States should have committed itself to Vietnam more heavily in 1961, saying that if U.S. troops had been sent to fight then, the present difficulties would not exist.

Rusk came into conflict with his Undersecretary of State, George Ball, about Vietnam. When Ball argued the governing duumvirate of Thieu and Ky in South Vietnam were "clowns" unworthy of American support, Rusk replied: "Don't give me that stuff. You don't understand that at the time of Korea we had to go out and dig up Syngman Rhee out of the bush where he was hiding. There was no government in Korea, either. We're going to get some breaks, and this thing is going to work." Rusk felt that Ball's memos arguing that American involvement in the war should be seen by as few as possible. At meetings of the National Security Council, Rusk consistently argued against Ball.

=== Britain will not send troops ===
In 1964 and again in 1965, Rusk approached the British Prime Minister Harold Wilson to ask for British troops to go to Vietnam, requests that were refused. The normally Anglophile Rusk saw the refusal as a "betrayal". Rusk told the Times of London: "All we needed was just one regiment. The Black Watch would have done it. Just one regiment, but you wouldn't. Well, don't expect us to save you again. They can invade Sussex and we won't do a damn thing about it."

Shortly before his death, Adlai Stevenson, the American ambassador to the UN, mentioned in an interview with the journalist Eric Severeid the aborted peace terms in Rangoon in 1964, saying the UN Secretary General U Thant was disappointed that Rusk had rejected the terms. When Johnson asked Rusk about the matter, the latter replied that in diplomacy "there is a difference between rejecting a proposal and not accepting it", a distinction that Rusk claimed that U Thant had missed.

=== Bombing pause discussed ===
In December 1965, when McNamara first told Johnson that the "military action approach is an unacceptable way to a successful conclusion" and urged him to pause the bombing of North Vietnam, Rusk advised the president that there was only a 1 in 20 chance that a bombing pause would lead to peace talks. However, Rusk argued for the bombing pause, saying "You must think about the morale of the American people if the other side keeps pushing. We must be able to say that all has been done." When Johnson announced the bombing pause on Christmas Day 1965, Rusk told the press "We have put everything into the basket of peace except the surrender of South Vietnam." Some of the language that Rusk included in his offer for peace talks seemed to calculate to inspire rejection such as the demand that Hanoi must publicly vow "to cease aggression" and the bombing pause was "a step toward peace, although there has not been the slightest hint or suggestion from the other side as to what they would do if the bombing stopped." On December 28, 1965, Rusk sent a cable to Henry Cabot Lodge Jr, the ambassador in Saigon, presenting the bombing pause as merely a cynical exercise in public relations as he wrote: "The prospect of large-scale reinforcements in men and defense budget increases for the next eighteen-month period requires solid preparation of the American public. A crucial element will be a clear demonstration that we have explored fully every alternative but the aggressors has left us no choice." Rusk ordered Henry A. Byroade, the ambassador in Rangoon, to make contact with the North Vietnamese ambassador to Burma with the offer that the bombing pause might be extended if North Vietnam made "a serious contribution to peace". The offer was rejected as the North Vietnamese refused to open peace talks until the bombing raids were stopped "unconditionally and for good". Like the other newly independent states in Africa and Asia, the North Vietnamese were extremely sensitive to any violation, real or perceived, of their newly achieved sovereignty, and the North Vietnamese Politburo regarded the bombing as a major violation of their nation's sovereignty. In a way that the Johnson administration had much trouble understanding, the North Vietnamese felt to negotiate with the Americans reserving the right to resume the bombing would be to accept a diminution of their country's independence, hence the demand for an unconditional bombing halt. In January 1966, Johnson ordered the Rolling Thunder bombing raids to resume.

=== France versus NATO ===
After President of France Charles de Gaulle withdrew France from the common NATO military command in February 1966 and ordered all American military forces to leave France, President Johnson asked Rusk to seek further clarification from President de Gaulle by asking whether the bodies of buried American soldiers must leave France as well. Rusk recorded in his autobiography that de Gaulle did not respond when asked, "Does your order include the bodies of American soldiers in France's cemeteries?"

=== Fulbright hearings on Vietnam ===
In February 1966, the Senate Foreign Relations Committee chaired by Fulbright held hearings on the Vietnam War and Fulbright had called as expert witnesses George F. Kennan and General James M. Gavin, who were both critical of the Vietnam War. Rusk who served as Johnson's principal spokesman on Vietnam was sent by the president together with General Maxwell Taylor to serve as his rebuttal witnesses before the Foreign Relations Committee. Rusk testified that the war was a morally justified struggle to halt "the steady extension of Communist power through force and threat". Historian Stanley Karnow wrote the televised hearings were a compelling "political theater" as Fulbright and Rusk verbally dueled about the merits of the Vietnam war with both men pouncing on any weaknesses in the other's argument.

=== 1966 hawks versus doves ===
By 1966, the Johnson administration had become divided between the "hawks" and the "doves", through the latter term was somewhat misleading as the "doves" within the administration merely favored opening peace talks to end the war as opposed to pulling out U.S. forces from Vietnam. Rusk together with the Chairman of the Joint Chiefs of Staff, General Earle "Bus" Wheeler and the National Security Adviser Walt Whitman Rostow were the leading "hawks" while the leading "doves" was Rusk's former ally McNamara together with Harriman. Rusk equated withdrawal from Vietnam as "appeasement", through at times he was willing to advise Johnson to open peace talks as a way to rebut domestic criticism that Johnson was unwilling to consider alternative ways to end the war.

=== 1967 deescalation ===
On April 18, 1967, Rusk said the United States was prepared to "take steps to deescalate the conflict whenever we are assured that the north will take appropriate corresponding steps".

In 1967, Rusk was opposed to the Operation Pennsylvania peace plan touted by Henry Kissinger, saying "Eight months pregnant with peace and all of them hoping to win the Nobel Peace Prize". When Kissinger reported that the North Vietnamese would not begin peace talks unless the bombing was stopped first, Rusk advocated continuing the bombing, telling Johnson: "If the bombing isn't having that much effect, why do they want to stop the bombing so much?"

=== Rusk family issues ===
Rusk's support for the Vietnam War caused considerable torment for his son Richard, who was opposed to the war but who enlisted in the Marine Corps and refused to attend anti-war demonstrations out of love for his father. The psychological strain caused the younger Rusk to suffer a nervous breakdown and led to a break between father and son.

Rusk considered resignation in the summer of 1967, because "his daughter planned to marry a black classmate at Stanford University, and he could not impose such a political burden on the president", after it became known that his daughter, Peggy, planned to marry Guy Smith, "a black Georgetown grad working at NASA". In response, the Richmond News Leader stated that it found the wedding offensive, further saying that "anything which diminishes [Rusk's] personal acceptability is an affair of state." He decided not to resign after talking to McNamara and the president. A year after his daughter's wedding, Rusk was invited to join the faculty of the University of Georgia Law School, only to have his appointment denounced by Roy Harris, an ally of Alabama Governor George Wallace and a member of the university's board of regents, who stated that his opposition was because of Peggy Rusk's interracial marriage. The university nonetheless appointed Rusk to the position.

=== Rusk sees communists in peace movement ===
In October 1967, Rusk told Johnson that he believed the March on the Pentagon was the work of "the Communists", and pressed Johnson to order an investigation to prove it. The investigation was launched involving the Federal Bureau of Investigation, the Central Intelligence Agency, the National Security Agency and military intelligence, and found "no significant evidence that would prove Communist control or direction of the U.S. peace movement and its leaders." Rusk said that the report was "naive" and that the agents should have done a better investigation.

=== Vietnam and 1968 election ===
When Johnson first discussed dropping out of the 1968 election at a National Security Council meeting in September 1967, Rusk was opposed, saying: "You must not go down. You are the Commander-in-chief, and we are in war. This would have a very serious effect on the country." When McNamara advised Johnson in October 1967 to agree to North Vietnam's demand that the United States cease the bombing campaign as the precondition for opening peace talks, Rusk opposed the idea of a "bombing pause" as removing the "incentive for peace", and urged Johnson to continue Operation Rolling Thunder. By this time, many at the State Department were concerned by Rusk's drinking on the job with William Bundy later saying that Rusk was a like a "zombie" until he started to drink. McNamara was shocked when he visited him at Foggy Bottom in the afternoon and saw Rusk open his desk to pull out a bottle of scotch, which he proceeded to drink in its entirety. Unlike the abrasive McNamara, who was widely disliked at the Pentagon, Rusk was sufficiently liked by his colleagues in the State Department that none leaked their concerns about his drinking to the media.

On January 5, 1968, notes by Rusk were delivered to Ambassador of the Soviet Union to the United States Anatoly Dobrynin, pleading support from the US to "avoid recurrence of" claimed bombing of Russian cargo ships in the Haiphong North Vietnam port the day prior. On February 9, Rusk was asked by Senator William Fulbright over his possible information in regards to a US tactical nuclear weapons introduction in South Vietnam report.

Like other members of the Johnson administration, Rusk was shaken by the surprise of the Tet Offensive. During a news briefing at the height of the Tet Offensive, Rusk who was known for his courteous manner, was asked how the Johnson administration was taken by surprise, causing him to snap in fury: "Whose side are you on? Now, I'm the Secretary of State of the United States, and I'm on our side! None of your papers or your broadcasting apparatuses are worth a damn unless the United States succeeds. They are trivial compared to that question. So I don't know why people have to be probing for things that one can bitch about, when there are two thousand stories on the same day about things that are more constructive." However, despite his rage at the media who he felt were misrepresenting the war, he admitted to finding signs that public opinion was shifting against the war. He later recalled that during a visit to Cherokee County in February 1968 that people were telling him: "Dean if you can't tell us when this war is going to end, well then maybe we just ought to chuck it." Rusk added "The fact was that we could not, in any good faith, tell them." Shortly afterwards, in March 1968 Rusk appeared as a witness before the Senate Foreign Relations Committee chaired by Fulbright that was examining allegations that the Johnson administration had been dishonest about the Gulf of Tonkin incident in 1964. Fulbright made his sympathies clear by wearing a necktie decorated with doves and olive branches. Through Rusk handled himself well under the relentless questioning by Fulbright, the televised hearings were another blow to the prestige of the Johnson administration as it became very apparent to the viewers that a number of senators were now opposed to the war or were only lukewarm in their support. When Fulbright asked Rusk to promise Congress a greater say in the war, Rusk replied that Johnson would consult "appropriate members of Congress". When Senator Claiborne Pell asked if the war was worth all the suffering, Rusk charged that he was suffering from "moral myopia" about "the endless struggle for freedom".

On April 17, during an American Society of Newspaper Editors luncheon meeting, Rusk admitted that the United States has taken "some lumps" propaganda wise but the Johnson administration should persist in trying to find a location of neutrality for the peace talks to occur. The following day, Rusk added 10 sites to the 5 proposed initially, accusing Hanoi of having a propaganda battle over neutral areas for discussion during a press conference.

Just before the peace talks in Paris were due to open on 13 May 1968, Rusk advocated bombing North Vietnam north of the 20 parallel, a proposal strongly opposed by the Defense Secretary Clark Clifford who stated it would wreck the peace talks. Clifford persuaded a reluctant Johnson to stick by his promise of 31 March 1968 of no bombing north of 20 parallel. Rusk continued his advocacy of bombing north of 20 parallel, telling Johnson on 21 May 1968 "We will not get a solution in Paris until we prove they can't win in the South". During a meeting on 26 July 1968, Johnson briefed all three presidential candidates about the state of the war and the peace talks. Rusk who attended the meeting agreed with Richard Nixon's statement that bombing provided leverage in the Paris peace talks, saying: "If the North Vietnamese were not being bombed, they would have no incentive to do anything". When Nixon asked "Where was the war lost?", Rusk replied: "In the editorial rooms of this country".

On June 26, Rusk assured Berlin citizens that the United States along with its North Atlantic Treaty partners were "determined" in securing Berlin's liberty and security, additionally criticizing the recent travel restrictions of East Germany as violating "long standing agreements and practice".

On September 30, Rusk met privately with Foreign Minister of Israel Abba Eban in New York City for discussion on peace plans from the Middle East.

In October 1968, when Johnson considered a complete bombing halt to North Vietnam, Rusk was opposed. On November 1, Rusk said long term allies of the North Vietnam bomb halt should pressure Hanoi to accelerate their involvement in the peace talks in Paris.

=== End of term ===
Nixon won the election and Rusk prepared to leave office January 20, 1969. On December 1, 1968, citing the halt of bombing in North Vietnam, Rusk said that the Soviet Union would need to come forward and do what it could to forward peace talks in southeast Asia. On December 22, Rusk appeared on television to officially confirm the 82 surviving crew members of the USS Pueblo intelligence ship, speaking on behalf of the hospitalized President Johnson.

In the last days of the Johnson administration, the president wanted to nominate Rusk to the Supreme Court. Although Rusk had studied the law, he did not have a law degree nor had he ever practiced law, but Johnson pointed out that the constitution did not require legal experience to serve on the Supreme Court and "I've already talked to Dick Russell and he said you'd be confirmed easily." However, Johnson failed to reckon with Senator James Eastland, the chairman of the Senate Judiciary Committee, who was also a white supremacist and a supporter of segregation. Though Eastland was a fellow Southerner, he had neither forgotten nor forgiven Rusk for allowing his daughter to marry a black man. Eastland announced he would not confirm Rusk if he were nominated to the Supreme Court.

On January 2, 1969, Rusk met with five Jewish American leaders in his office to assure them the US had not changed its policy in the Middle East of recognizing the sovereignty of Israel. One of the leaders, the American-Israeli Public Affairs committee's Irving Kane, said afterward that Rusk had successfully convinced him.

== Retirement ==
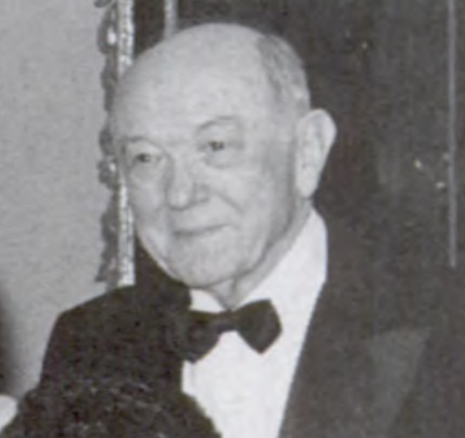
Rusk in his later years

January 20, 1969 marked Rusk's last day as Secretary of State, and upon leaving Foggy Bottom he delivered a brief valedictory: "Eight years ago, Mrs. Rusk and I came quietly. We wish now to leave quietly. Thank you very much". At a farewell dinner hosted by Dobrynin, the longest-serving ambassador in Washington, Rusk told his host: "What's done cannot be undone." After the dinner, Rusk drove away in a modest car that barely seemed to be working, which Dobrynin considered to an apt symbolic end to the Johnson administration. Upon his return to Georgia, Rusk suffered from a prolonged bout of depression and suffered from psychosomatic illnesses, visiting doctors with complaints of chest and stomach pains that appeared to have no physical basis. Unable to work, Rusk was supported throughout 1969 by the Rockefeller Foundation who paid him a salary as a "distinguished fellow".

On July 27, 1969, Rusk voiced his support for the Nixon administration's proposed anti-ballistic missile system, saying that he would vote for it, were he a senator, from an understanding that further proposals would be reviewed if any progress would be made in Soviet Union peace talks. The same year, Rusk received both the Sylvanus Thayer Award and the Presidential Medal of Freedom, with Distinction.

Following his retirement, he taught international law at the University of Georgia School of Law in Athens, Georgia (1970–1984). Rusk was emotionally exhausted after 8 years as Secretary of State and narrowly survived a nervous breakdown in 1969. Roy Harris, a university regent who served as the Georgia campaign manager for the presidential campaign of George Wallace in 1968, tried to block Rusk's appointment under the ostensible grounds "We don't want the university to be a haven for broken-down politicians", but in reality because he was opposed to a man who had allowed his daughter to marry a black man. However, Harris's vote was overruled. Rusk found that the return to teaching in 1970 and the resumption of the academic career he had abandoned in 1940 was emotionally satisfying. The other professors remembered him as being like a "junior associate seeking tenure". Rusk told his son "The students I was privileged to teach helped rejuvenate my life and make a new start after those hard years in Washington."

In the 1970s, Rusk was a member of the Committee on Present Danger, a hawkish group opposed to détente with the Soviet Union and distrustful of treaties to control the nuclear arms race.

In 1973, Rusk eulogized Johnson when he lay in state.

In 1984, Rusk's son Richard, whom he had not spoken to since 1970 owing to the opposition of Rusk fils to the Vietnam War, surprised his father by returning to Georgia from Alaska to seek a reconciliation. As part of the reconciliation process, Rusk, who had gone blind by this point, agreed to dictate his memoirs to his son, who recorded what he said and wrote it down into what became the book As I Saw It.

=== Rusk's memoir ===
In a review of his memoir As I Saw It, the American historian Warren Cohen noted that little of the acrimony of Rusk's relations with McNamara, Bundy and Fulbright appeared, but that Rusk was unremittingly hostile in his picture of Kennedy's closest adviser and right-hand man, his younger brother Robert, together with the UN Secretary General U Thant. In As I Saw It, Rusk expressed considerable anger at the media's coverage of the Vietnam War, accusing anti-war journalists of "faking" stories and images that portrayed the war in an unflattering light. Rusk spoke about what he called the "so-called freedom of the press", as he maintained that journalists from The New York Times and The Washington Post only wrote what their editors told them to write, saying, if there were true freedom of the press, both newspapers would have portrayed the war more positively. Despite his hawkish views towards the Soviet Union, Rusk stated during his time as Secretary of State that he never saw any evidence that the Soviet Union planned to invade Western Europe and he "seriously doubted" that it ever would. Cohen noted that in contrast to his years with Kennedy, Rusk was warmer and more protective towards Johnson, whom he clearly got on better with than he ever did with Kennedy.

In a review of As I Saw It, the historian George C. Herring wrote that the book was mostly dull and uninformative when it came to Rusk's time as Secretary of State, telling little that historians did not already know, and the most interesting and passionate parts concerned his youth in the "Old South" and his conflict and reconciliation with his son Richard.

== Death and legacy ==
Rusk died of heart failure in Athens, Georgia, on December 20, 1994, at the age of 85. He and his wife are buried at the Oconee Hill Cemetery in Athens.

Rusk Eating House, the first women's eating house at Davidson College, was founded in 1977 and is named in his honor. The Dean Rusk International Studies Program at Davidson College is also named in his honor.

Dean Rusk Middle School, located in Canton, Georgia, was named in his honor, as was Dean Rusk Hall on the campus of the University of Georgia.

The consensus of historians is that Rusk was a very intelligent man, but very shy and so deeply immersed in details and the complexities of each case that he was reluctant to make a decision and unable to clearly explain to the media what the government's policies were. Jonathan Coleman says that he was deeply involved in the Berlin Crisis, the Cuban Missile Crisis, NATO, and the Vietnam War. Typically he was highly cautious on most issues, except for Vietnam:

He established only a distant relationship with President Kennedy but worked more closely with President Johnson. Both presidents appreciated his loyalty and his low‐key style. Although an indefatigable worker, Rusk exhibited little talent as a manager of the Department of State.

Regarding Vietnam, historians agree that President Johnson relied heavily on the advice of Rusk, Defense Secretary Robert McNamara, and national security adviser McGeorge Bundy to the effect that a communist takeover of all of Vietnam was unacceptable, and the only way to prevent it was to escalate America's commitment. Johnson took their conclusions and rejected dissenting views.

Rusk's son Rich wrote about his father's time as Secretary of State: "With this reticent, reserved, self-contained, emotionally bound-up father of mine from rural Georgia, how could the decision making have gone any differently? His taciturn qualities, which served him so well in negotiating with the Russians, ill-prepared him for the wrenching, introspective, soul-shattering journey that a true reappraisal of Vietnam policy would have involved. Although trained for high office, he was unprepared for such a journey, for admitting that thousands of American lives, and hundreds of thousands of Vietnamese, might have been lost in vain."

George Herring wrote about Rusk in 1992: "He is a man utterly without pretense, a thoroughly decent individual, a man of stern countenance and unbending principles. He is a man with a passion for secrecy. He is a shy and reticent man, who as Secretary of State sipped scotch to loosen his tongue for press conferences. Stolid and normally laconic, he also has a keen, dry wit. He has often been described as the 'perfect number two,' a loyal subordinate who had strong—if unexpressed—reservations about the Bay of Pigs operation, but after its failure could defend it as though he had planned it."

Summarizing the views of historians and political scientists, Smith Simpson states:

Here was a man who had much going for him but failed in crucial respects. A decent, intelligent, well-educated man of broad experience in world affairs who, early in life, evidenced qualities of leadership, seemed diffidently to hold back rather than to lead as secretary of state, seeming to behave, in important ways, like a sleeve-plucking follower of presidents rather than their wise and persuasive counselor.

== In popular culture ==
Marvel Comics features a fictionalized version of Dean Rusk named "Dell Rusk," a corrupt politician later revealed to be an alter-ego of the supervillain Red Skull. This is foreshadowed by the fact that Dell Rusk is an anagram of Red Skull.

The character of Dell Rusk also appears in the video game Marvel: Avengers Alliance, in which he is a member of the World Security Council that controls S.H.I.E.L.D. This iteration of Dell Rusk appears to be a distinct character rather than a disguise used by Red Skull.

== Media ==
Appearances

- Cuban Missile Crisis Revisited. Produced for The Idea Channel by the Free to Choose Network, 1983.
  - Phase I (U1015) (January 22, 1983)
    - Featuring Dean Rusk, McGeorge Bundy, Richard Neustadt, Edwin Martin & Donald Wilson in Atlanta, Georgia.

Portrayal in media

- Secretary Rusk was portrayed by actor Larry Gates in the 1974 ABC television docudrama The Missiles of October, dramatizing the Cuban Missile Crisis of October, 1962.
- Actor Henry Strozier played Secretary Rusk in another dramatization of the Cuban Missile Crisis Thirteen Days (2000), a theatrical film directed by Roger Donaldson.
- Actor John Aylward played Secretary Rusk in the biographical television film Path to War (2002) directed by John Frankenheimer.

== Publications ==
- "U.S. Foreign Policy: A Discussion with Former Secretaries of State Dean Rusk, William P. Rogers, Cyrus R. Vance, and Alexander M. Haig, Jr.". International Studies Notes, Vol. 11, No. 1, Special Edition: The Secretaries of State, Fall 1984. JSTOR 44234902 (pp. 10–20).

== See also ==
- Rusk documents

Government offices
Preceded by Dean Acheson as Assistant Secretary of State for Congressional Relations and International Conferences	Assistant Secretary of State for International Organization Affairs; 1949	Succeeded by John D. Hickerson
Preceded by William Walton Butterworth	Assistant Secretary of State for Far Eastern Affairs; 1950–1951	Succeeded by John Moore Allison
Non-profit organization positions
Preceded by Chester Barnard	President of the Rockefeller Foundation; July 17, 1952 – January 19, 1961	Succeeded by J. George Harrar
Political offices
Preceded by Christian Herter	U.S. Secretary of State; Served under: John F. Kennedy, Lyndon B. Johnson; 1961–1969	Succeeded by William P. Rogers
Awards
Preceded by Bob Hope	Sylvanus Thayer Award recipient 1969	Succeeded by Ellsworth Bunker
