= Georgia's 55th House of Representatives district =

State district in Georgia, USA

Georgia's 55th State House of Representatives district
Representative
Inga Willis; D–Atlanta
- Demographics: 23.8% White; 69.8% Black; 2.7% Hispanic; 2.0% Asian
- Population: 59,582

District 55 elects one member of the Georgia House of Representatives. It contains parts of Fulton County.

== Members ==
- Tyrone Brooks (2013–2015)
- Marie Metze (2015–2023)
- Inga Willis (since 2023)
