= Inga Willis =

American politician

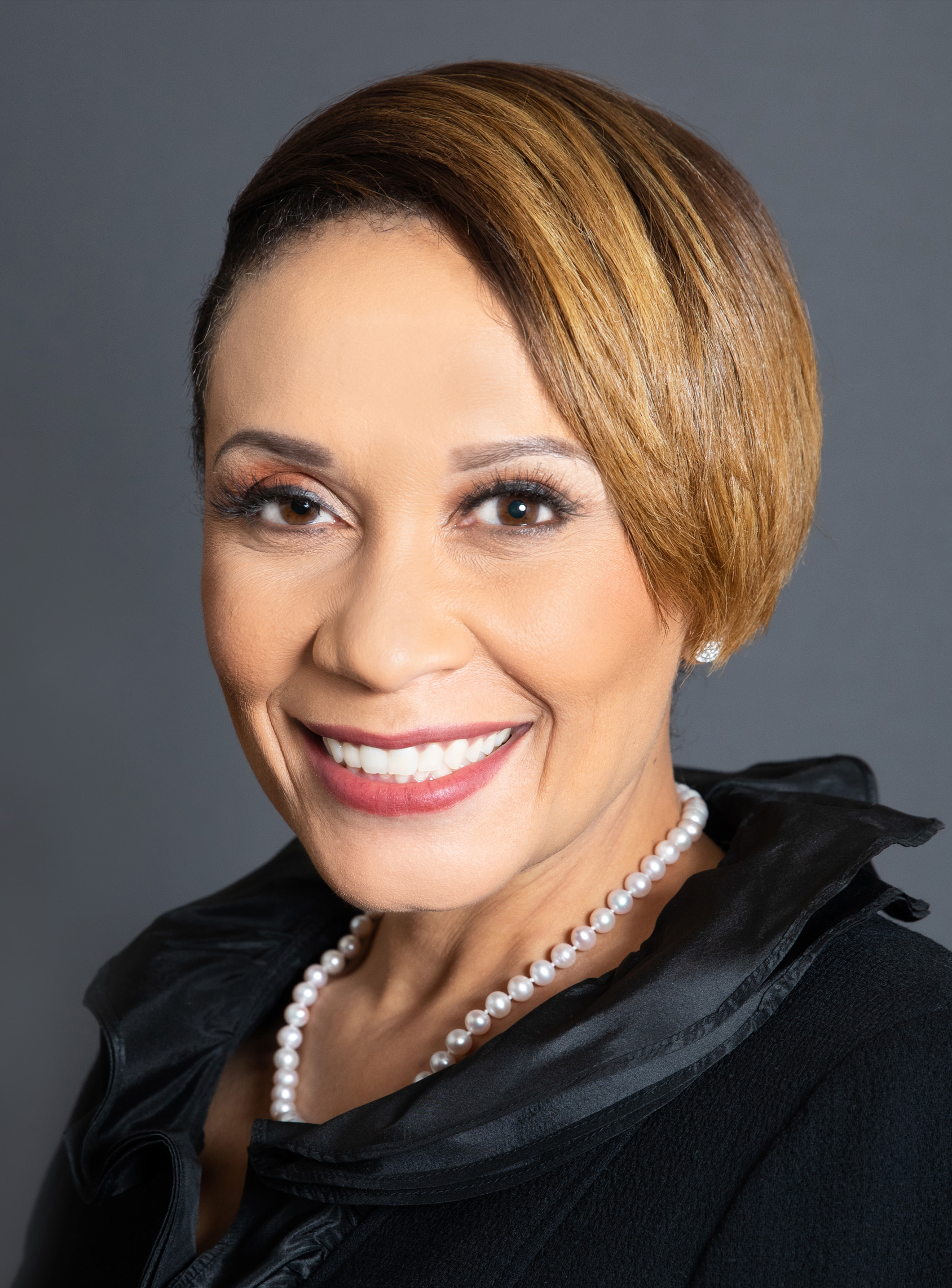

Member of the Georgia House of Representatives from the 55th district
- Incumbent
- Assumed office January 9, 2023
- Preceded by: Marie Metze

Personal details
- Born: Atlanta, Georgia, U.S.
- Party: Democratic
- Education: Howard University

Inga Willis is an American politician from the Georgia Democratic Party who serves as a member of the Georgia House of Representatives representing District 55.
