= H. William Fitelson =

American lawyer

H. William Fitelson (January 21, 1905 – May 19, 1994) was an American entertainment lawyer with Fitelson & Mayers, managing director of the Theatre Guild, and a founding board member of the Actors Studio. He also served on the board of the American Civil Liberties Union.

== Early life and education ==
Fitelson was born in New York, NY, on January 21, 1905. He attended public schools. He graduated from New York Law School in 1927 and passed the bar.

== Career ==
He took up the practice of entertainment industry law in New York City. His clients worked in theater and film, including Broadway personalities and investors. Clients included Joshua Logan and Elia Kazan, and Gypsy Rose Lee and Ethel Merman. Author James Baldwin called him "a feisty Napoleon of the theater."

"While practicing law in the firm of Fitelson and Mayers, Fitelson advocated for many causes." He served as general counsel and managing director of radio and television programming for the Theatre Guild. He was a member of the original board of directors of the Actors Studio upon its formation in 1948. He was a sponsor of the National Lawyers Guild.

He also served on the board of the American Civil Liberties Union (ACLU). In September 1946, he published an article, "The Murders in Monroe," in the September 1946 issue of The New Republic. He was responding to the murders in July of four young African Americans in the Moore's Ford lynchings in Georgia, which had outraged people across the United States. Fitelson raised numerous questions intended to identify issues in the case and challenge statements that had already been made by some figures. The ACLU was among civil rights organizations urging President Harry Truman to take action in the case.

From the 1940s through the 1960s, Fitelson was involved in the production of musicals and dramas, as well as motion pictures.

He retired from Fitelson & Mayers (also known as Fitelson, Mayers & London) in the mid-1980s.

== Personal life ==
Fitelson married Anita. They had two daughters, Margaret and Robin, and a son, David Fitelson. He became a doctor.

Fitelson had a wide circle of acquaintances, and corresponded with New York intellectuals such as philosopher Sidney Hook and art historian Meyer Schapiro.

He died at home in New York City at age 89 of obstructive cardiopulmonary disease.

== Bibliography ==
- Theatre Guild on the Air (1947) edited by H. William Fitelson
- H. William Fitelson Letter to Kurt Weill, 1949, July 22 (1949)
