= Tyrone Brooks =

American politician and civil rights activist

Member of the Georgia House of Representatives
- In office January 12, 1981 – April 9, 2015
- Preceded by: Lottie H. Watkins
- Succeeded by: Marie Metze
- Constituency: 34th district (1981–1993); 54th district (1993–2003); 47th district (2003–2005); 63rd district (2005–2013); 55th district (2013–2015)

Personal details
- Born: Tyrone Leon Brooks; October 10, 1945 (age 80) Washington, Georgia, U.S.
- Party: Democratic
- Spouse: Mary

Tyrone Leon Brooks Sr. (born October 10, 1945) is an American politician and civil rights activist from Wilkes County, Georgia. A member of the Democratic Party, Brooks served in the Georgia House of Representatives from 1981 to 2015. He was convicted of financial crimes and imprisoned.

== Early life and education ==
Tyrone Brooks was born to Ruby and Mose Brooks in Washington, Georgia and grew up in Warrenton, Georgia, where he attended public schools.

He graduated from Boggs Academy in Keysville, Georgia in 1963, and was later invited to lectures/seminars at Lassalle Institute, Howard University, Atlanta University, and the Harvard University John F. Kennedy School of Government. In May 2001, the John Marshall School of Law awarded him an honorary degree of Doctor of Jurisprudence.

== Civic activities ==
Brooks began his career in public service at age 15, as a volunteer with the Southern Christian Leadership Conference (SCLC), working for civil and human rights. He became a full-time staffer of the organization in 1967. Over the years, Brooks served in a number of positions at the SCLC, both locally and nationally. Through that work, he came into contact with Martin Luther King Jr., Ralph Abernathy, Hosea Williams and Joseph Lowery. As a front line civil rights activist with the SCLC, he was jailed more than 60 times.

Brooks worked with a committee in Walton County to memorialize the 1946 lynchings of four African Americans at Moore's Ford, the last mass lynching in the state. His efforts to get the US Department of Justice to reopen an investigation into that cold case led to a modern reexamination of that crime. However, upon investigation, the Justice Department was not able to find sufficient evidence to prosecute any suspects.

While Brooks worked for social justice, his motivations were not always selfless. It was reported that Brooks established a "fraud charity he created purportedly to run a literacy program". It was later determined that Brooks "redirected" $1 million of the charitable donations to his personal use, over a 15-year period.

== Georgia House of Representatives ==
For a period of 34 years, Brooks served as a Democratic member of the Georgia House of Representatives. Over those years, as district lines were altered by the reapportionment process, the district number of Brooks' constituency changed five separate times. During his final years in the house he served on the House Economic Development & Tourism, Governmental Affairs, and Retirement committees. Brooks was forced to resign his seat in the Legislature in 2015, when he was convicted of felony tax fraud.

=== Legislative initiatives ===
During his tenure in the Legislature, Representative Brooks was a member and officer of the House Appropriations Committee and Special Rules, where he supported legislation to help the poor. He led the successful movement to reactivate the town of Keysville, Georgia. In response, the city named a street in his honor. Brooks also introducing legislation to divest all public pension funds controlled by the state of Georgia from South Africa. That measure came before the House, but failed on a recorded vote. He also sponsored a symbolic resolution calling for the unconditional release of Nelson Mandela.

Brooks introduced House Bill 16, which resulted in winning an almost twenty-year battle in the General Assembly to change the Georgia state flag. It became law January 31, 2001.

In 2005, Brooks sponsored legislation to repeal the final vestiges of Jim Crow era segregation laws from the Georgia Constitution and legal code. In 2006 he introduced House Bill 101, which allowed law enforcement officers the opportunity to buy back service prior to 1976, which was denied to them because of race. He also helped pass Antiterrorism legislation, the establishment of the Positive Employment and Community Help (PEACH) Program, and the Reapportionment Max Black Plan.

== Felony conviction ==
On April 9, 2015, Brooks resigned from the House and pleaded guilty to felony federal tax fraud, and no contest to federal wire and mail fraud charges related to the misappropriation of approximately $1 million from two non-profit organizations associated with him. He was sentenced to one year and one day of prison. As a result of the conviction, in addition to time in jail, Brooks lost his right to vote.
