= Moore's Ford lynchings =

Unprosecuted 1946 mob lynchings in Georgia, United States

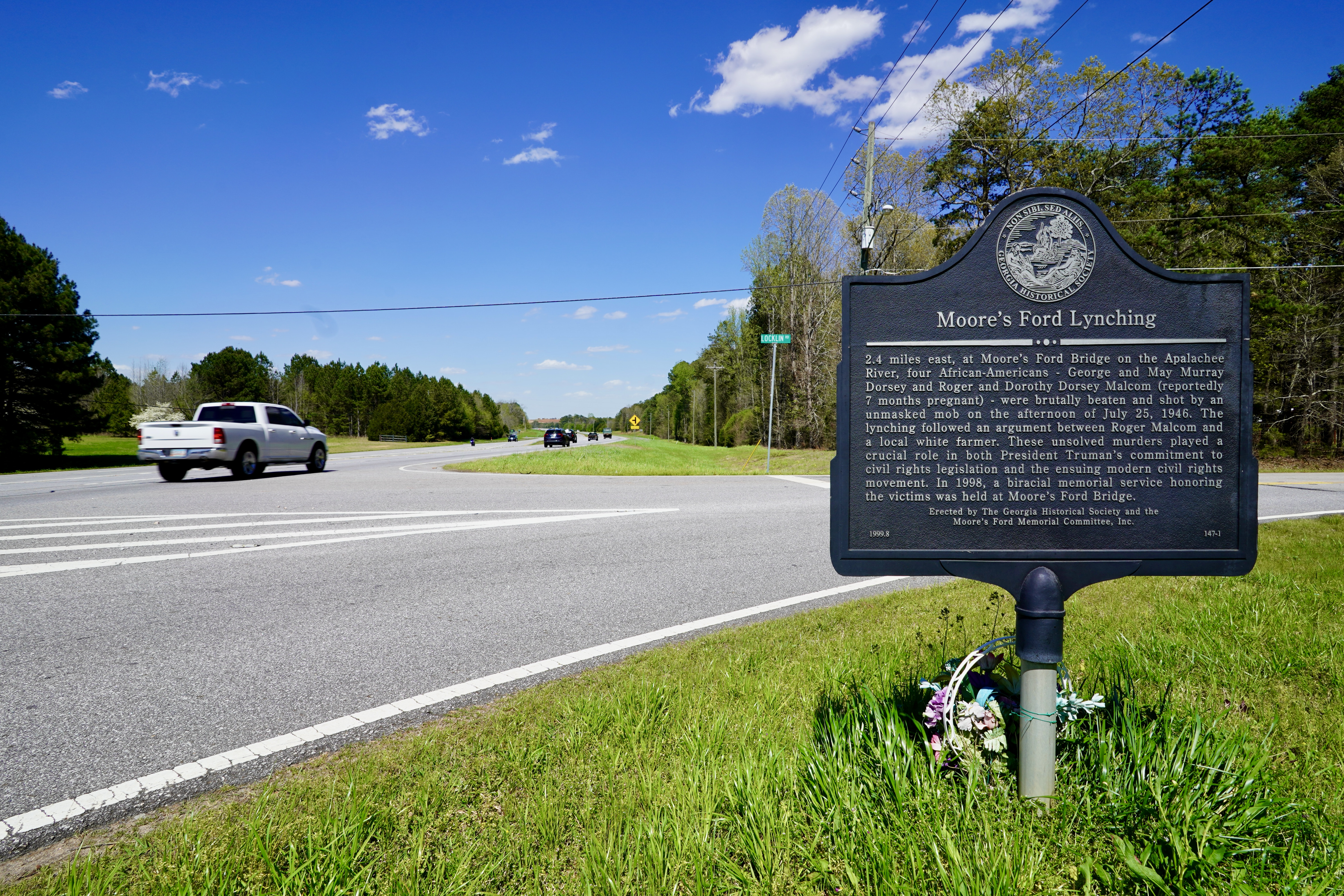
Moore's Ford Lynchings Historical Marker

The Moore's Ford lynchings, also known as the 1946 Georgia lynching, refers to the July 25, 1946, murders of four young African Americans by a mob of unmasked white men in the U.S. state of Georgia. The lynching victims were two married couples: George W. and Mae Murray Dorsey, and Roger and Dorothy Dorsey Malcom. Tradition says that the murders were committed on Moore's Ford Bridge in Walton County and Oconee County, Georgia, between Monroe and Watkinsville. However, the victims were shot and killed on a nearby dirt road.

The case attracted national attention and catalyzed large protests in Washington, DC, and New York City. President Harry Truman created the President's Committee on Civil Rights and his administration introduced anti-lynching legislation in Congress but could not get it past the Southern Democratic bloc. The Federal Bureau of Investigation (FBI) investigated for four months in 1946, the first time it had been ordered to investigate a civil rights case, but it was unable to discover sufficient evidence to bring any charges.

In the 1990s, publicity about the cold case led to a new investigation. The state of Georgia and the FBI finally closed their cases in December 2017, again unable to prosecute any suspect.

The Malcoms and Dorseys have been commemorated by a community memorial service in 1998. A state historical marker placed in 1999 at the site of the attack — Georgia's first official recognition of a lynching — and an annual re-enactment has been held since 2005.

According to the 2017 report by the Equal Justice Initiative on lynchings in the Southern United States, Georgia has the second-highest number of documented lynchings (589), after Mississippi (654).

== Background ==
In the aftermath of World War II, there was considerable social unrest in the US, especially in the South. African-American veterans resented being treated as second-class citizens after returning home and began to press for civil rights, including the ability to vote. But many white supremacists resented them and wanted to reestablish dominance. The number of lynchings of black people rose after the war, with twelve lynched in the Deep South in 1945 alone. The states' exclusion of most black people from the political system across the South since the turn of the century had been maintained through a variety of devices, despite several challenges that reached the US Supreme Court.

In April 1946, the Supreme Court of the United States ruled that white primaries were unconstitutional, making way for at least some African Americans to vote in Democratic Party primaries that year. In Georgia, some black people prepared to vote in the July primary, against the resistance of most whites. This change is believed to have contributed to the lynchings, as related to the continued white effort to intimidate blacks and suppress their voting.

In 1946, the three-time former governor of Georgia, Eugene Talmadge, was involved in a difficult battle to win the Democratic primary for nomination as governor in the general election that year. At the time, whites in the South voted overwhelmingly for Democratic candidates and winning the Democratic primary was tantamount to winning a general election for an office.

Talmadge's campaign was noted for its violent racist rhetoric: he boasted about having assaulted and flogged the black sharecroppers who worked for his family when he was a young man. He claimed to have carried an ax when he chased a black man who had sat next to a white woman. While campaigning in Walton County, Talmadge held a rally attended by about 600 in Monroe. Among those who attended the rally were two local white farmers, Barnette Hester and J. Loy Harrison, both of whom spoke afterward to Talmadge at a campaign barbecue. Harrison was a long-time supporter of Talmadge and had named his second son after the governor.

Although Talmadge called his opponent, James V. Carmichael, a "nigger lover", Carmichael's rally in Monroe a week later attracted a larger crowd. This suggested that many of the white farmers who had voted for Talmadge as governor in three previous elections were beginning to tire of him.

=== July events ===
In July 1946, J. Loy Harrison employed two young African-American couples as sharecroppers on his farm in Walton County, Georgia. One was George W. Dorsey and his wife Mae (née Murray) Dorsey. George Dorsey (born November 1917) was a veteran of World War II; he had been back in the US less than nine months after having served nearly five years in the Pacific War. Mae Dorsey was born September 20, 1922. The other couple were Roger Malcom (born March 22, 1922) and his wife Dorothy (née Dorsey) Malcom (born July 25, 1926), who was George Dorsey's sister. She was reported by a newspaper to allegedly be pregnant. She was also known as Doris and Millie Kate.

On July 11, Roger Malcom allegedly stabbed Barnette Hester, a white man who was his boss and landlord; Malcom was arrested and held in the county jail in Monroe, the Walton county seat.

In 2007, the Associated Press reported revelations about former governor Eugene Talmadge, based on 3,725 pages of FBI material related to its 1946 investigation of the Moore's Ford lynching. Talmadge returned to Monroe on July 12, a day after the stabbing of Barnette Hester. This was five days before the Democratic gubernatorial primary on July 17, and he was seeking rural votes. (According to the county unit system, he could win the primary if he won enough counties, even if his popular vote was not the highest.)

The FBI's investigation later that year reported a witness saying that Talmadge was seen talking to George Hester, the brother of Barnette Hester, in front of the Walton County courthouse in Monroe. Talmadge reportedly "offered immunity to anyone 'taking care of negro'." He hoped the Hester family would use their influence to help him win Walton County in the imminent Democratic primary for governor. Talmadge needed to win enough rural counties in Georgia in order to offset the popularity of his opponent Carmichael in urban areas with higher numbers of residents.

== Mass lynching ==
On July 25, Harrison drove Malcom's wife Dorothy and the Dorseys to Monroe, where he personally posted the $600 bail for Roger Malcom to be freed. At the time, Hester was still hospitalized from his stab wounds.

Harrison drove with the two couples back to his farm. At 5:30 p.m. that day, he was forced to stop his car near the Moore's Ford Bridge between Monroe and Watkinsville, where the road was blocked by a gang of 15 to 20 armed white men. According to Harrison:

A big man who was dressed mighty proud in a double-breasted brown suit was giving the orders. He pointed to Roger Malcom and said, "We want that nigger." Then he pointed to George Dorsey, my nigger, and said, "We want you, too, Charlie." I said, "His name ain't Charlie; he's George." Someone said "Keep your damned big mouth shut. This ain't your party."

Harrison watched. One of the black women identified one of the assailants. At that point, the man in the expensive suit ordered: "Get those damned women too". The mob took both the women to a big oak tree and tied them beside their husbands. The mob fired three point-blank volleys. The coroner's estimate counted 60 shots were fired at close range. The two couples were shot and killed on a dirt road near Moore's Ford Bridge, which spanned the Apalachee River, 60 miles (97 km) east of Atlanta.

=== Reaction ===
The mass lynching received national coverage and generated widespread outrage. Large protests and marches against the lynchings took place in New York City and Washington, DC. President Harry S. Truman directed the Justice Department to investigate the crimes under federal civil rights law, the first time the FBI would do so. He also created the President's Committee on Civil Rights in December 1946. The Truman administration introduced anti-lynching legislation in Congress, but was unable to get it passed against the opposition of the white southern Democratic bloc in the Senate. Together with outrage about the Columbia race riot of 1946, the Moore's Ford lynchings generated increased awareness and support from more of the white public for the growing Civil Rights Movement. Demonstrators marched outside of the White House demanding the end of lynchings.

On July 28, 1946, a funeral for the Dorseys and Dorothy Malcom was held at the Mount Perry Baptist Church. As George Dorsey was a World War II veteran, and his coffin was draped in an American flag. The funeral was well attended by the national news media, although many black people stayed away out of fear. One black man at the funeral told a journalist from The Chicago Defender: "They're exterminating us. They're killing Negro veterans and we don't have nothing to fight back with except our bare hands".

In his article "The Murders in Monroe", in The New Republic (September 1946), lawyer H. William Fitelson raised a number of questions about the Moore's Ford case: why did Sheriff L.S. Gordon of Walton County set the bail for Roger Malcom at only $600 (a relatively low sum) and why did Harrison bail out Malcom although he knew Malcom likely be convicted soon and go to prison? Fitelson said that sharecroppers were easy to replace, and he thought it odd that Harrison spent $600 just to get a man who was likely to be temporary labor, when he could have hired another sharecropper to replace Malcom for much less money. Fitelson noted that Harrison could have driven the Malcoms and the Dorseys to his farm via the paved highway, which was faster and more convenient, but instead drove down an unpaved dirt side road that was much slower and less used by travelers. He suggested this choice likely ensured no outside witnesses to the mass lynching.

Fitelson wondered about how the lynch mob knew the precise time of day and the road Harrison would use to return to his farm. He thought it strange that Sheriff Gordon personally released Malcom from the Walton County jail late in the afternoon, but he had not visited the crime scene nor attended the coroner's inquest. Fitelson noted that Mae Dorsey was said to have called out the names of several members of the lynch mob before her death, while Harrison, who had lived his entire life in Walton County, claimed not to know any. Finally, Fitelson noted that Harrison was not harmed by the lynch mob. Even if he truthfully could not identify them that day, the mob let Harrison live, knowing he could recognize one or more of them in the future. Fitelson noted that if charged, members of the lynch mob would have faced four counts of first-degree murder. He wrote that it was most peculiar that the lynch mob allowed a witness to live who had seen them kill four people.

== Investigation ==
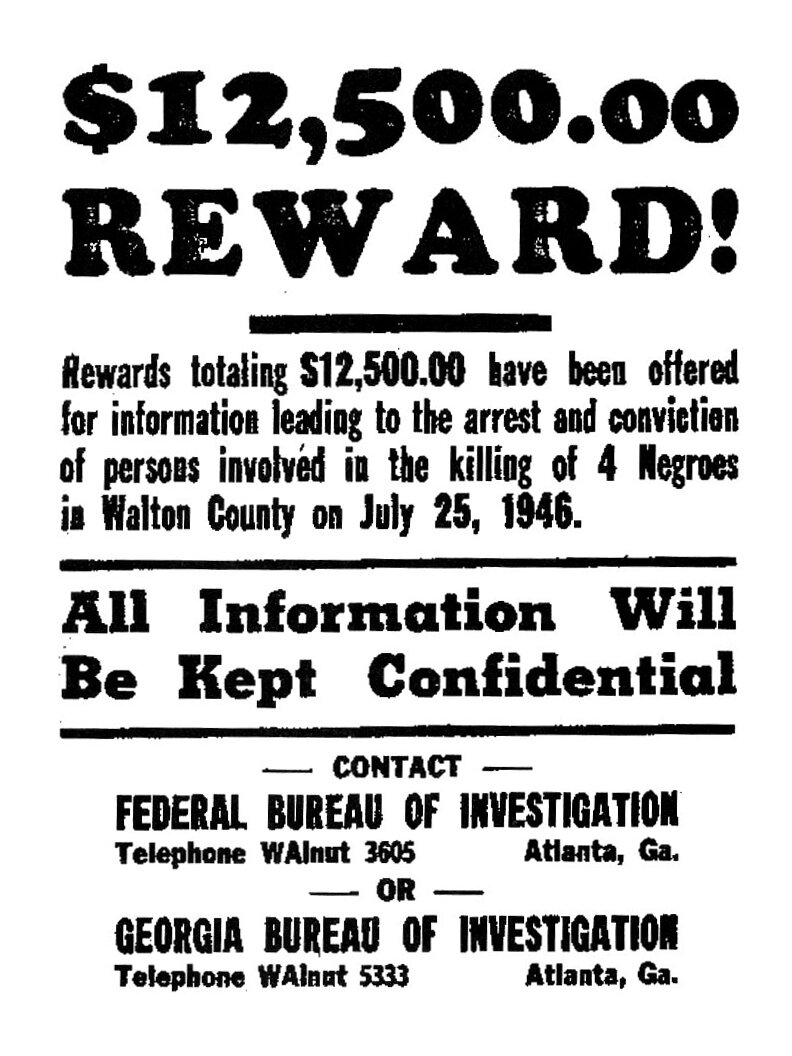
An FBI poster asking the public for information on the 1946 Georgia lynching at Moore's Ford Bridge

Georgia Governor Ellis Arnall offered a reward of $10,000 for information, to no avail. For the first time, President Truman ordered the FBI to investigate the murders under federal civil rights law. They interviewed nearly 3,000 people in their six-month investigation, and issued 100 subpoenas. The investigation received little cooperation: no one confessed, and suspected perpetrators were offered alibis for their whereabouts. The FBI found little physical evidence, and the prosecutor did not have sufficient grounds to indict anyone. The FBI agents reported that the farmers of Walton County were "extremely clannish, not well educated and highly sensitive to 'outside' criticism." The black sharecroppers were described by the FBI as "frightened and even terrified"; one man ran into a field in an effort to evade their questioning him. When cornered, he said that he had been warned not to speak to the FBI or he would be lynched as well.

Harrison claimed not to know any of the lynch mob. The FBI agents heard allegations that Harrison was a member of the Ku Klux Klan and had bailed Malcom out of jail to turn him over to the lynch mob. Harrison made contradictory statements as he changed his story, at one point saying he had been "directed" by someone whose name he claimed not to remember to use a less traveled road on the way home; the police suspected that he may have been involved in plans for the lynching.

None of the lynch mob wore masks, and Harrison's claims not to know any of them were widely disbelieved. Policeman Major William Spence told the press on August 3, 1946: "Harrison is either scared of being killed himself or he's lying in his teeth or both". The assistant police chief of Monroe, Ed Williamson, told the FBI about a conversation he had overheard between Talmadge and George Hester, Barnette's brother. The FBI reported: "The opinion on Mr. Williamson's part was that this conversation between Talmadge and Hester probably resulted in the Blasingame District [the part of Walton County where the Hesters lived] going very definitely in the Talmadge column". The FBI agent investigating the lynching characterized the allegation that Talmadge had led the lynch mob as "unbelievable", but he forwarded the statement to FBI director J.E. Hoover "as it may be of some possible future interest."

Thurgood Marshall, legal counsel for the National Association for the Advancement of Colored People (NAACP), who monitored the FBI's investigation, wrote in a memo to NAACP's director, Walter White: "I have no faith in either Mr. Hoover or his investigators...and there is no use in my saying I do". White issued two public telegrams to the U.S. Attorney General Tom Clark and to President Truman. In the telegram to Clark, White said the Moore's Ford lynchings were "...the direct result of a conspiratorial campaign to violate the U.S. constitution by Eugene Talmadge and the Ku Klux Klan". In his telegram to Truman, White said the lynchings at Moore's Ford were the latest case of "the outbreak of lawlessness which threatens not only minorities but democracy itself". No one was brought to trial for the crimes.

In the Democratic primary, Talmadge won Walton County; his opponent Carmichael won more popular votes overall, but Talmadge won more counties. Under the "county unit system" used in Georgia at the time, he won the nomination as Democratic candidate for governor in 1946. The "county unit system", which gave equal weight to each county, was biased toward rural counties. The candidate who won the most counties won the primary. Carmichael won 313, 389 votes but only 146 counties, while Talmadge won 297, 245 votes and 242 counties, thus winning the primary.

Talmadge died on December 21, 1946, of liver cirrhosis caused by his alcoholism. His body lay in state at the Georgia capitol, where the coffin was surrounded by wreaths of flowers left by well wishers; one card read KKKK (Knights of the Ku Klux Klan). In 1943, columnist Ralph McGill of the Atlanta Constitution reported that Talmadge was a member of the Klan and had been speaking at Klan events. When questioned by the media about it, Talmadge proudly admitted this and said he was sorry that the media had missed all the "fun" Klan rallies at which he had spoken.

== Grand jury investigation ==
On December 2, 1946, U.S. District Judge T. Hoyt Davis selected and charged a 23-man grand jury, which included two African Americans, to hear testimony in the case. At the time Governor Ellis Arnall claimed "that 15 to 20 of the mob members are known by name." The case was presented to the jury by United States District Attorney John P. Cowart and John Kelly from the Criminal Division of the Department of Justice. The judge "pointed out that federal courts have no jurisdiction over the offense of murder except under well defined conditions."

Barnette Hester, the man allegedly stabbed by Roger Malcom, testified. He was followed by Harrison, the farmer who had employed the two couples, who testified for six hours. The following Monday was the fifth day of testimony. On that day, Harrison's sons Loy Jr. and Talmadge testified. Additionally, B. H. Hester, the father of Barnette and George Hester, testified. Perry Dillard, Eugene Evans, Emmerson Farmer, and Ridden Farmer, who lived near the location of the four shooting murders, testified that day as well. The last to be questioned that day was FBI Agent George Dillard.

On December 10, the sixth day of hearings, ten witnesses were heard. They were: Joe Parrish, Harrison's brother-in-law; George Robert Hester and James Weldon Hester, brothers of Barnette Hester; Grady Malcom, Weyman Fletcher Malcom, Cleonius Malcom, Levy Adcock, Willie Lou Head, and FBI Agent Dick Hunter.

On the seventh day of testimony, six people were questioned. Among them were African Americans Mrs. Elizabeth Toler, Eugene White, Boysie Daniel, and Paul Brown.

Monday's testimony was highlighted by the appearance before the grand jury of Mrs. Jesse Warwick. The wife of a Monroe minister, she testified to seeing men in at least two carloads gather on a roadside in the vicinity of Monroe at some point between the stabbing of Hester and the incident at Moore's Ford. That event was believed to have been a rehearsal for the lynching. The government intended to show planning, possibly with the knowledge of Walton County law officers and Harrison. Other witnesses that day were Monroe Chief of Police Ben Dickerson; Gene Sloan, a youth from the Georgia Boys' Training School at Milledgeville; and Mrs. Moena Williams, mother of Dorothy Malcom, who said that Dorothy was killed on her twentieth birthday.

George Alvin Adcock, a resident of Monroe, was indicted by the federal grand jury for perjury. He was accused of two counts of false testimony regarding his statements on December 11, 1946. The first count alleged he denied leaving his house the day of the crime. He supposedly visited the town of Monroe that day. The second count states that he denied visiting the scene of the crime on July 26. Sixteen witnesses were questioned that day, including Mrs. Powell Adcock.

After hearing nearly three weeks of testimony, the grand jury was "unable to establish the identity of any persons guilty of violating the civil rights statute of the United States."

== Beating of Lamar Howard ==
At about four o'clock on January 1, 1947, brothers James and Tom Verner walked into the municipal ice house, briefly speaking with plant manager Will Perry. When the pair walked to where Lamar Howard was sitting, Tom Verner slapped the cap of the young African American to the floor. James asked him, "What did you tell 'em down at Athens?" To which he replied that he knew nothing to tell them. They started to attack him. Howard's employer, Will Perry, allegedly suggested that the two "take him out in the back."

The Verner brothers continued beating Howard while questioning him. The beating concluded after 10 or 15 minutes with no resistance from Howard, as he feared he would be killed. When the Verners stopped, Howard got to his car and drove home. U.S. Attorney John P. Cowart arrested the Verner brothers and charged them with "unlawfully injuring Golden Lamar Howard because of his having testified before a federal grand jury" and "conspiring to injure" him. The Verners' $10,000 bonds were signed by H.L. Peters of Walton County, who put up 316 acres (1.28 km^{2}) of land as security. Howard had testified to a grand jury in the Moore's Ford lynchings, but the proceedings were supposed to be secret.

James Verner acknowledged he had beaten Howard until his fists were bloody. His brother Tom testified, as did other witnesses, who said that James Verner committed the crime for which he was charged. Despite the testimony, the jury deliberated for nearly two hours and rendered a verdict of not guilty.

== Memorial committee and reopened investigations ==
In 1992, Clinton Adams told the FBI that he had been a witness to the murders at Moore's Ford Bridge. Only ten years old when he saw the lynchings, Adams had avoided talking about them, and had moved away; for 45 years, he feared for his life. After extensive research, reporter Laura Wexler wrote a book about the case, Fire in a Canebrake: The Last Mass Lynching in America (2003). She said that Adams had "holes in his story."

In 1992, The Atlanta Constitution reported Adams's story and the history of the unsolved lynchings, raising awareness about the murders. Five years later, the Oconee Enterprise, Walton Tribune, and the Athens Daily News also published accounts. With the renewed publicity, some people in the community decided to act rather than to continue silence about the case.

In 1997, Georgia citizens led by Richard "Rich" Rusk established the biracial Moore's Ford Memorial Committee to commemorate the lynching and work for racial reconciliation. They have conducted a number of activities, including restoration of cemeteries where the victims were buried, erecting tombstones at the previously unmarked graves, conducting education about the events, and setting up scholarships in the names of those who died. In 1998, they held a biracial memorial service on the anniversary of the attack.

They worked with the Georgia Historical Society to ensure a state historical marker was placed near the murder site. It was erected on U.S. Highway 78 in 1999, on the fifty-third anniversary of the incident. The marker, 2.4 miles (3.9 km) to the west, identifies the site as the location of the last unsolved mass lynching in America. Additionally, it recognizes the 1998 memorial service. It is believed to be the first highway marker to commemorate a lynching. Also in 1999, the Memorial Committee arranged for a military memorial service to honor veteran George Dorsey on the anniversary of the lynching.

In 2001 Gov. Roy Barnes officially reopened investigation into the case with the Georgia Bureau of Investigation (GBI). By 2006, the FBI had reentered the case. It was among a dozen cold cases related to the civil rights era which the Department of Justice was investigating. In June 2008, as part of this, the GBI and FBI searched an area at a farm home in Walton County near Gratis and collected material which they believed to be related to the lynching. While the FBI questioned an 86-year-old man about the lynchings in 2015, it closed its investigation, unable to prosecute any suspect. In January 2018, the Georgia Bureau of Investigation officially closed the lynching investigation, ending the effort to bring the perpetrators of the lynching to justice. No one was ever charged or prosecuted in the case, which has become known as "America's last mass lynching".

In 2007, the Associated Press reported on findings from more than 3,700 pages of the previously closed FBI files, having gained access through an Freedom of Information Act (FOIA) request. There was evidence suggesting that the lynching of Malcom was ordered or at least encouraged by former three-term governor Eugene Talmadge, overheard a day after the stabbing as having offered immunity for people taking care of the African American. He was in a highly competitive race for the 1946 Democratic primary for the governor's office; it was held five days later and the county voted in his favor. He won the office in the general election as well, but died before inauguration.

When the allegations about Talmadge were reported, Rich Rusk told a journalist:

It would not surprise me if state officials at all levels were implicated, if not in the actual killings, at least in the cover-up that followed. The conspiracy of silence wasn't just the fault of the local farmers. It was the entire culture, from the top down.

Historian Robert Pratt said about the allegations of Talmadge's involvement:

I'm not surprised ... historians over the years have concluded the violently racist tone of his 1946 campaign may have been indirectly responsible for the violence that came at Moore's Ford. It's fair to say he's one of the most virulently racist governors the state has ever had.

Since 2005, the Moore's Ford Memorial Committee has annually re-enacted the lynchings at Moore's Ford in July as a living memorial to the victims. This effort was initiated by Tyrone Brooks, a civil rights activist and state legislator. In recent years, most of the participants have come from Atlanta, about an hour away. (Note: Bob Caine, one of the white actors in the lynching reenactment, is a descendant of Leo Frank, a Jewish man lynched by a white vigilantes in 1915 after the governor of Georgia had commuted his death sentence to life imprisonment following his wrongful conviction of charges of rape and murder of a young local woman.)

== Grand jury testimony remains sealed ==
Researcher and author Anthony Pitch located the sealed grand jury testimony in the National Archives. He sued to have the records unsealed. Despite government opposition, a federal court ruled in his favor, and on February 11, 2019, the United States Court of Appeals for the Eleventh Circuit, in a 2–1 decision, affirmed the lower court's ruling that the transcripts of the grand jury proceedings should be released. The Trump administration's Department of Justice under Attorney General William Barr asked for a rehearing in the court of appeal, maintaining that to open the testimony would undermine the confidentiality of a grand jury investigation. US law permits grand jury testimony to be unsealed in "exceptional circumstances".

Juliet Sorensen, a professor at Northwestern Law, argued in 2019:

If this isn't an exceptional circumstance, what is? It's now 73 years in the past. Surely, no targets of the investigation are still living. I don't believe that granting the release of the records in this case will open the door to courts ordering grand jury record disclosures willy-nilly.

Atanya L. Hayes, the granddaughter of the Malcoms, argued: "It made me really disappointed in our judicial system and FBI and all the people who were supposed to protect us. You should not be able to enjoy that good reputation. Dead or alive, good or bad, the truth needs to be known".

On March 27, 2020, an appeals court in Atlanta ruled in favor of the federal government and ordered that the records remain sealed permanently.

In an editorial on April 26, 2020, the Toledo Blade condemned the 8–4 decision of the appeals court, stating:

There is no good reason to keep the grand jury transcripts and other evidence about the lynching sealed. The courts should make this information available to the public. The blood of the victims calls out for disclosure. Their suffering must not be forgotten. If disclosure causes political or personal reputations to suffer, so be it.

== Location ==
A newer highway bridge has been built near the site, located at the extreme eastern edge of Walton County, Georgia, between Monroe and Athens, near the Athens–Clarke County region west of the University of Georgia. The Georgia Historical Society erected a state historical marker near the site. The historical marker was one of the first in the US to document a lynching. The sign is at 33°51.417′N 83°36.733′W, at the intersection of US 78 and Locklin Road, on the right when traveling east on US 78.

== See also ==
- Lynching in the United States
