= Marie Metze =

American politician (born 1938)

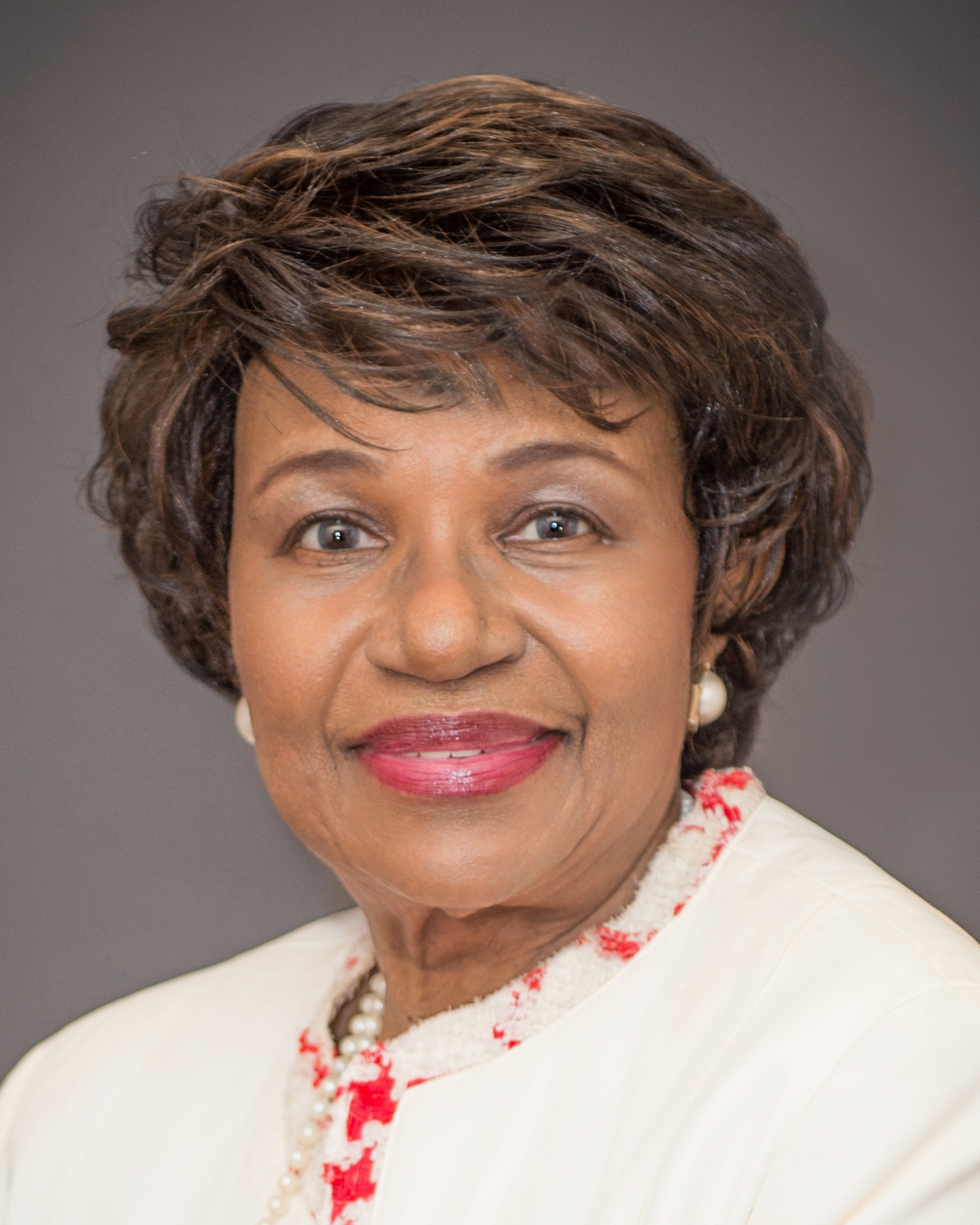

Member of the Georgia House of Representatives from the 55th district
- In office July 30, 2015 – January 9, 2023
- Preceded by: Tyrone Brooks
- Succeeded by: Inga Willis

Personal details
- Born: December 24, 1938 (age 87)
- Party: Democratic

Marie Robinson Metze (born December 24, 1938) is an American politician who served in the Georgia House of Representatives from the 55th district from 2015 to 2023.

Georgia House of Representatives
Preceded by Tyrone Brooks	Member of the Georgia House of Representatives from the 55th district 2015–2023	Succeeded by Inga Willis
