= Fayette County Courthouse =

Fayette County Courthouse may refer to:

- Fayette County Courthouse (Alabama), Fayette, Alabama
- Fayette County Courthouse (Georgia), Fayetteville, Georgia
- Fayette County Courthouse (Illinois), Vandalia, Illinois
- Fayette County Courthouse (Indiana), Connersville, Indiana
- Fayette County Courthouse (Iowa), West Union, Iowa
- Fayette County Courthouse (Ohio), Washington Courthouse, Ohio
- Fayette County Courthouse (Tennessee), Somerville, Tennessee
- Fayette County Courthouse and Jail, La Grange, Texas
  - Fayette County Courthouse Square Historic District
- Fayette County Courthouse (West Virginia), Fayetteville, West Virginia
