= Andrewartha =

Andrewartha and Trewartha are Cornish family names.

== Etymology ==
Cornish Names says:

- Nouns:
  - "tre" a "town", feminine, maybe a hamlet or house
  - "tref: village, town", Brythonic Celt Welsh about 4-500 AD
- Adjectives:
  - "Wartha": "upper" (maybe higher or greater or on a hill)
    - cf. "Wollas": "lower" (maybe smaller or lesser or in a valley, of the two).
- Definite article:
  - "An" used as: "of the", "in the", "on the", "at the", in place names. Brythonic Celt Cornish language (Dexter, p. 18).

The book mentions "Trewartha" (p. 25), and "Andrewartha" (p. 60).

The Handbook of Cornish Names states: "Trewartha" is a Cornish name meaning "Upper Farm" or "Upper Homestead".

== People ==
- Herbert Andrewartha (1907–1992), Australian research scientist in the fields of entomology, biology, zoology and animal ecology
- Janet Andrewartha (1951–2024), Australian actress
- John Andrewartha, Cornish-born American architect and civil engineer
- Roy Andrewartha, Welsh snooker player, finalist at the 1977, 1978, 1979 & 1984 World Snooker Championships
- Jake Andrewartha, Australian Olympian judoka, 2014 Commonwealth Games Medalist and professional wrestler
