= Fayette County Courthouse and Jail =

- U.S. National Register of Historic Places
- U.S. Historic district – Contributing property
- Texas State Antiquities Landmark
- Recorded Texas Historic Landmark
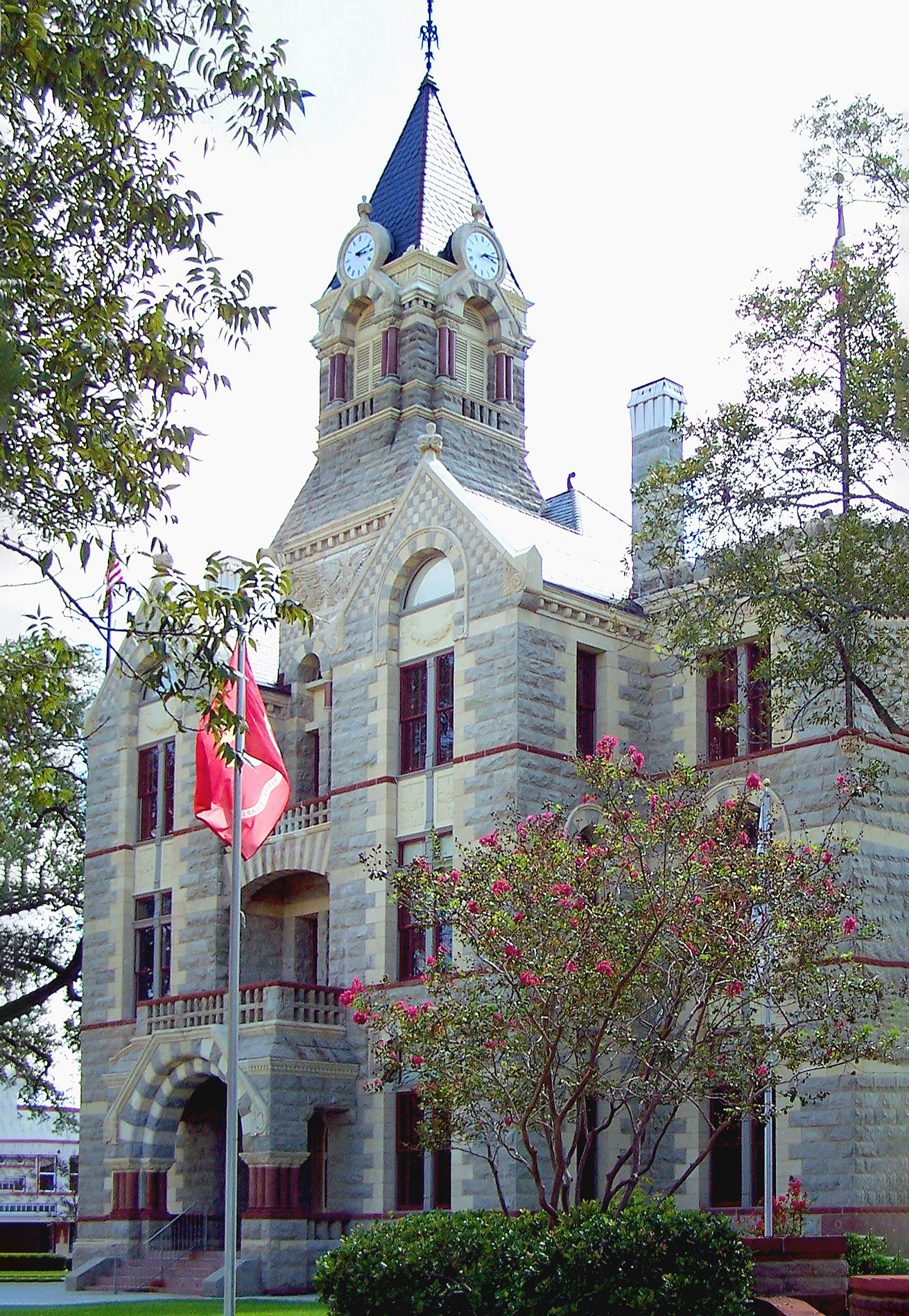
- Fayette County Courthouse 2006

- Location within Texas Location within the United States
- Interactive map showing the location of Fayette County Courthouse and Jail
- Location: La Grange, Texas
- Coordinates: 29°54′16″N 96°52′41″W
- Built: 1891, 1881
- Built by: Martin, Byrne & Johnston (courthouse); Fritze Schulte (jail)
- Architect: James Riely Gordon (courthouse); John Andrewartha and James Wahrenberger (jail)
- Architectural style: Gothic, Romanesque Revival
- Part of: Fayette County Courthouse Square Historic District (ID00001664)
- NRHP reference No.: 75001973

Significant dates
- Added to NRHP: 23 January 1975
- Designated CP: 16 January 2001
- Designated TSAL: 1 Jan 1981
- Designated RTHL: 1975

The Fayette County Courthouse and the Fayette County Jail are two historic buildings in La Grange, Texas. The courthouse was designed by James Riely Gordon and built in 1891 by Martin, Byrne and Johnston. The jail was built earlier in 1881 by Fritz Schulte and designed by John Andrewartha and James Wahrenberger. Both buildings were added to the National Register of Historic Places (NRHP) as a single listing on January 23, 1975. and designated a Texas State Antiquities Landmark on January 1, 1981 by the Texas Historical Commission (THC). Texas historical marker number 12627 erected in 2001 commemorates the courthouse's status as a Recorded Texas Historic Landmark, marker no. 18757 placed in 2017 does likewise for the jail. On January 16, 2001 both buildings were designated and recorded in the NRHP as contributing properties to the Fayette County Courthouse Square Historic District.

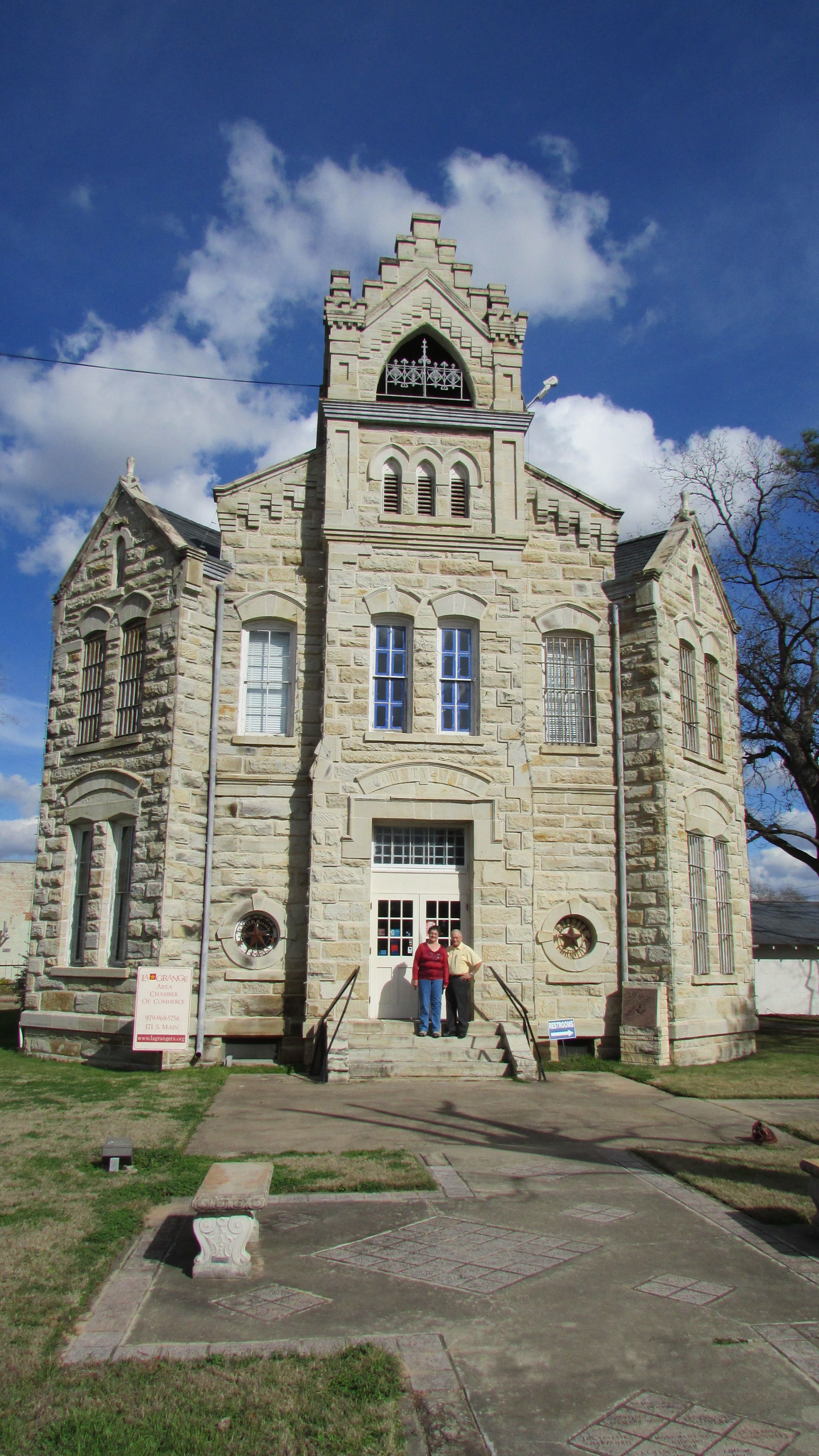
The Fayette County Jail in 2013

== Photo gallery ==
Pictures of the Fayette County Courthouse and Fayette County Jail
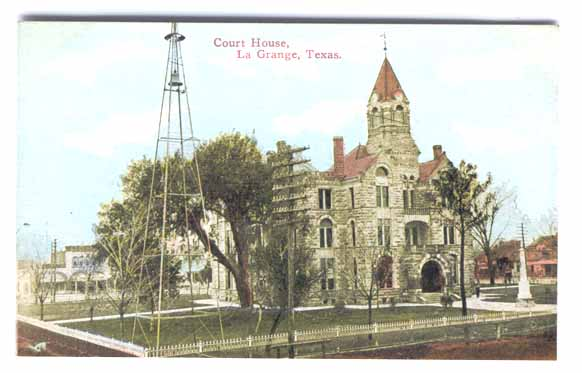
Courthouse facade shown on postcard from c. 1910

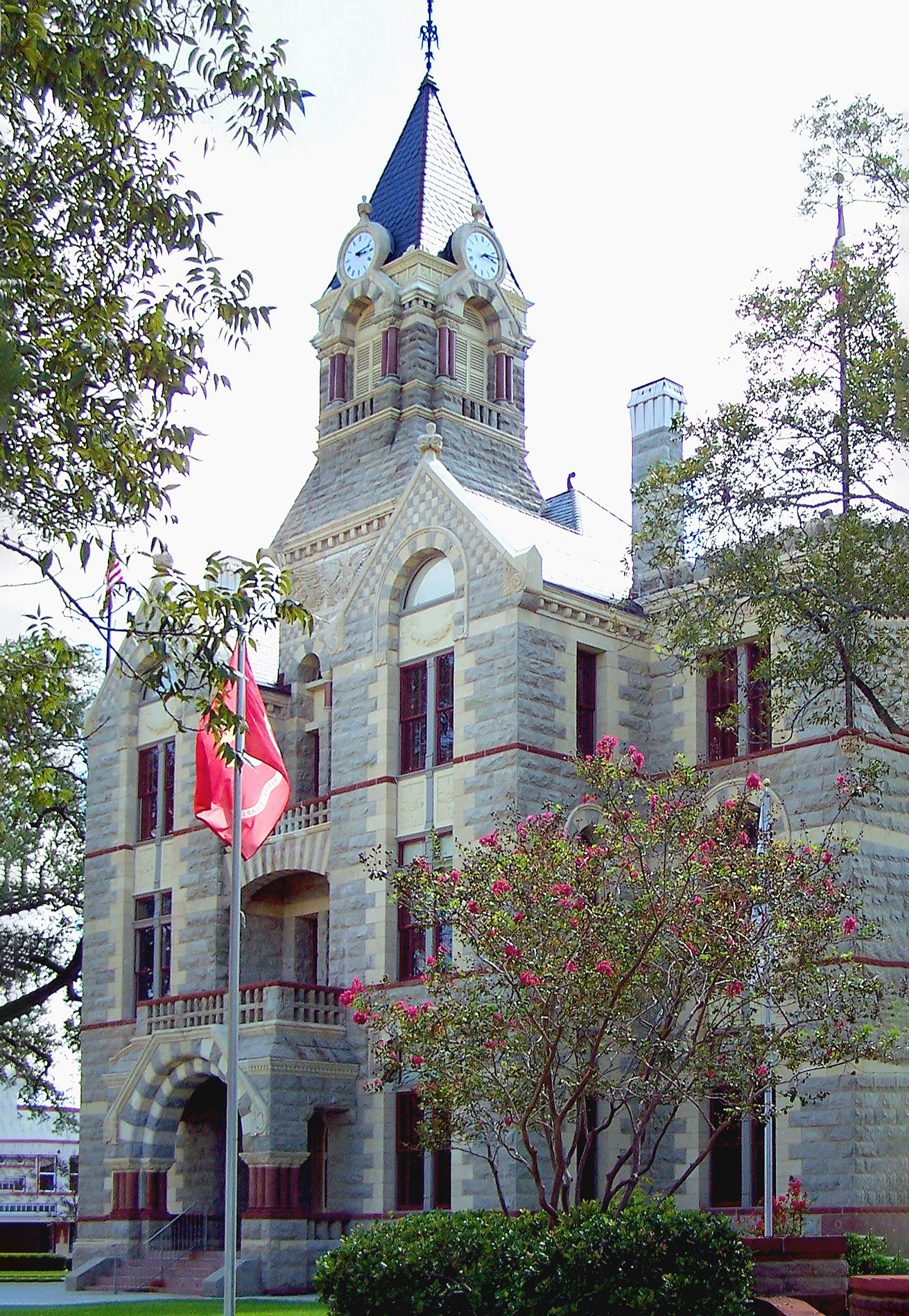
Courthouse facade from northeast (2006)

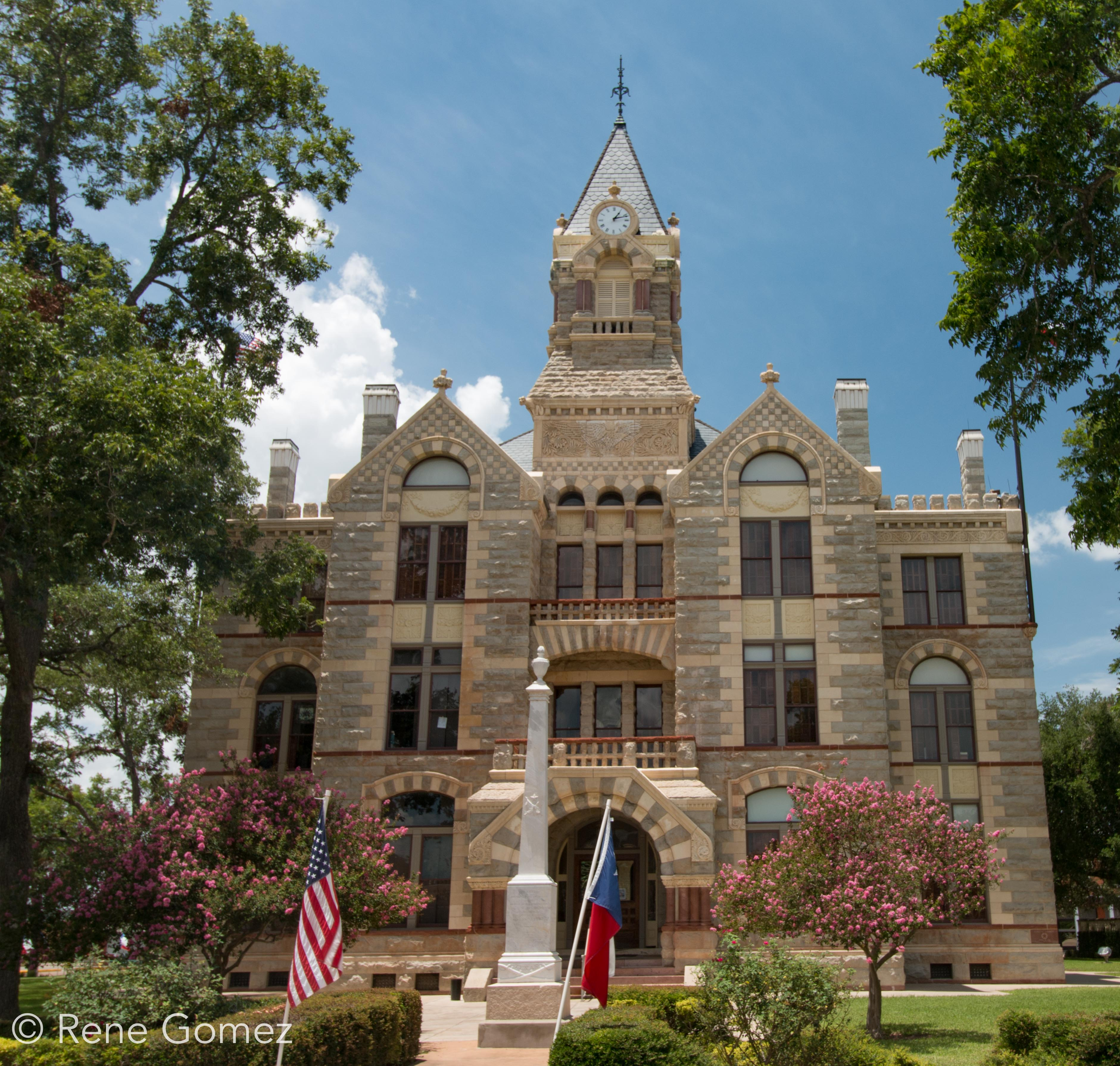
Courthouse facade, east elevation (2017)

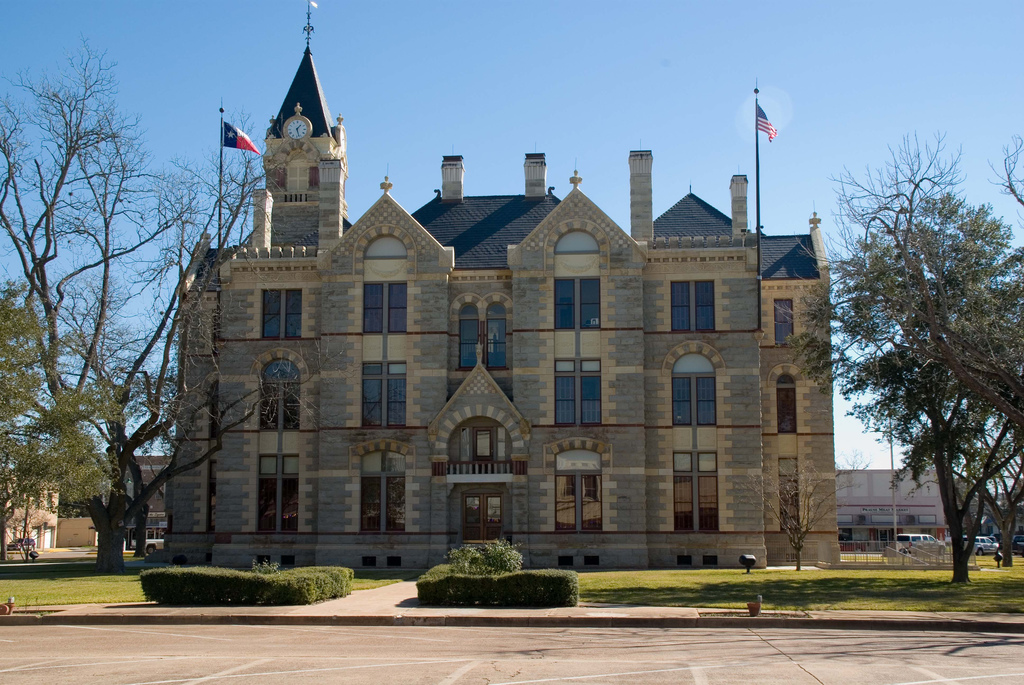
Courthouse north elevation (2007)

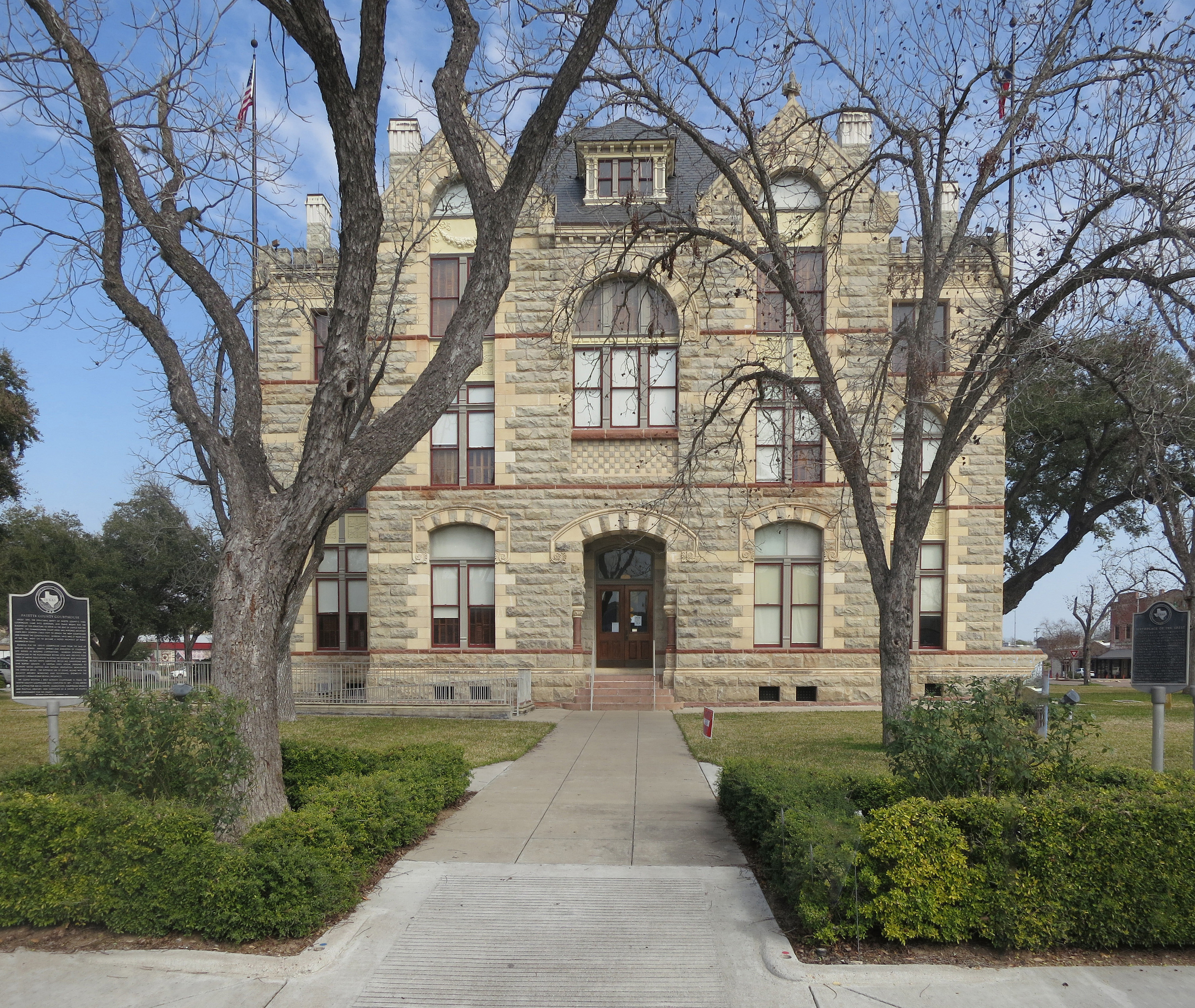
Courthouse rear, west elevation (2015)

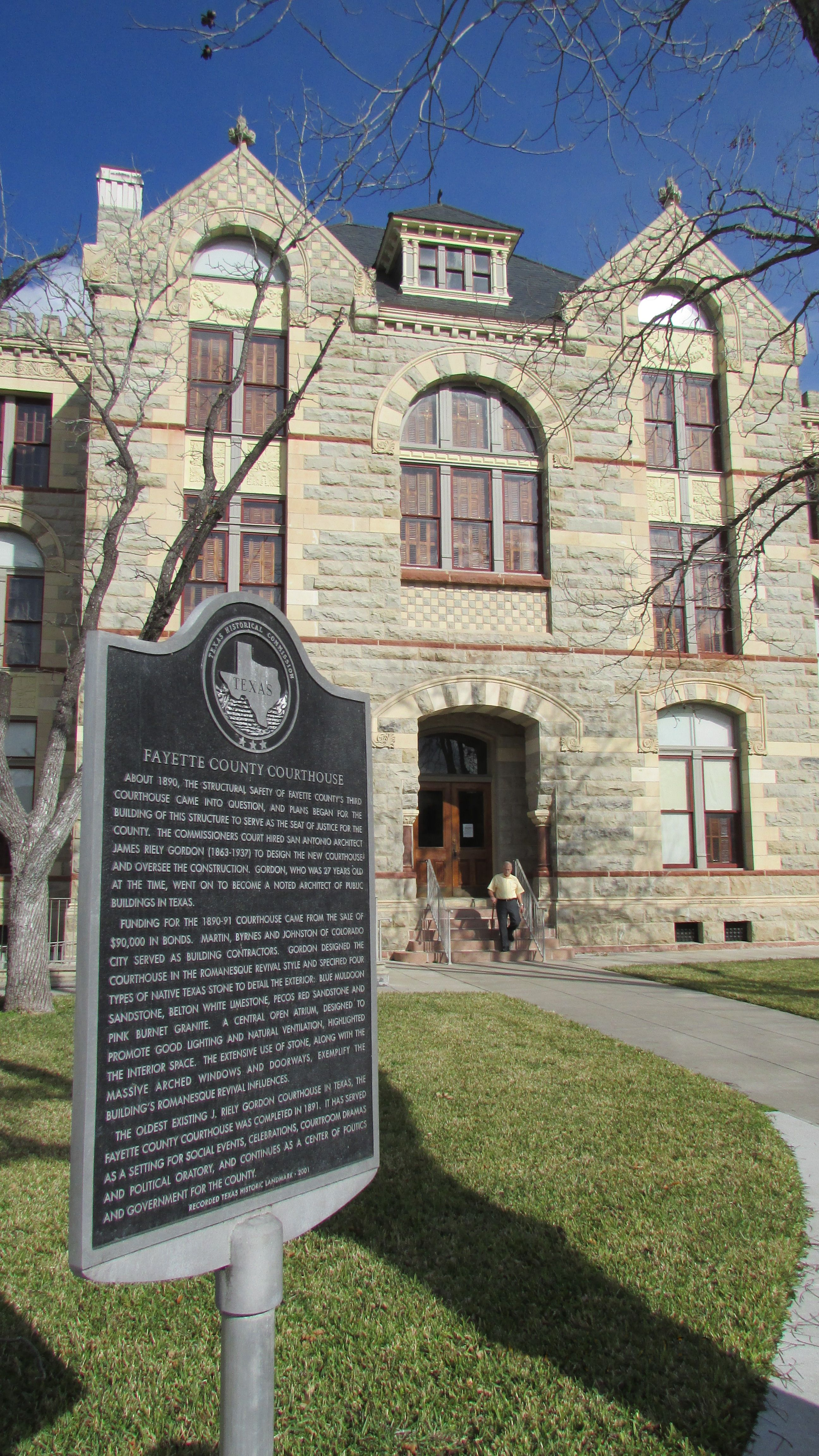
Courthouse rear from northwest (2013)

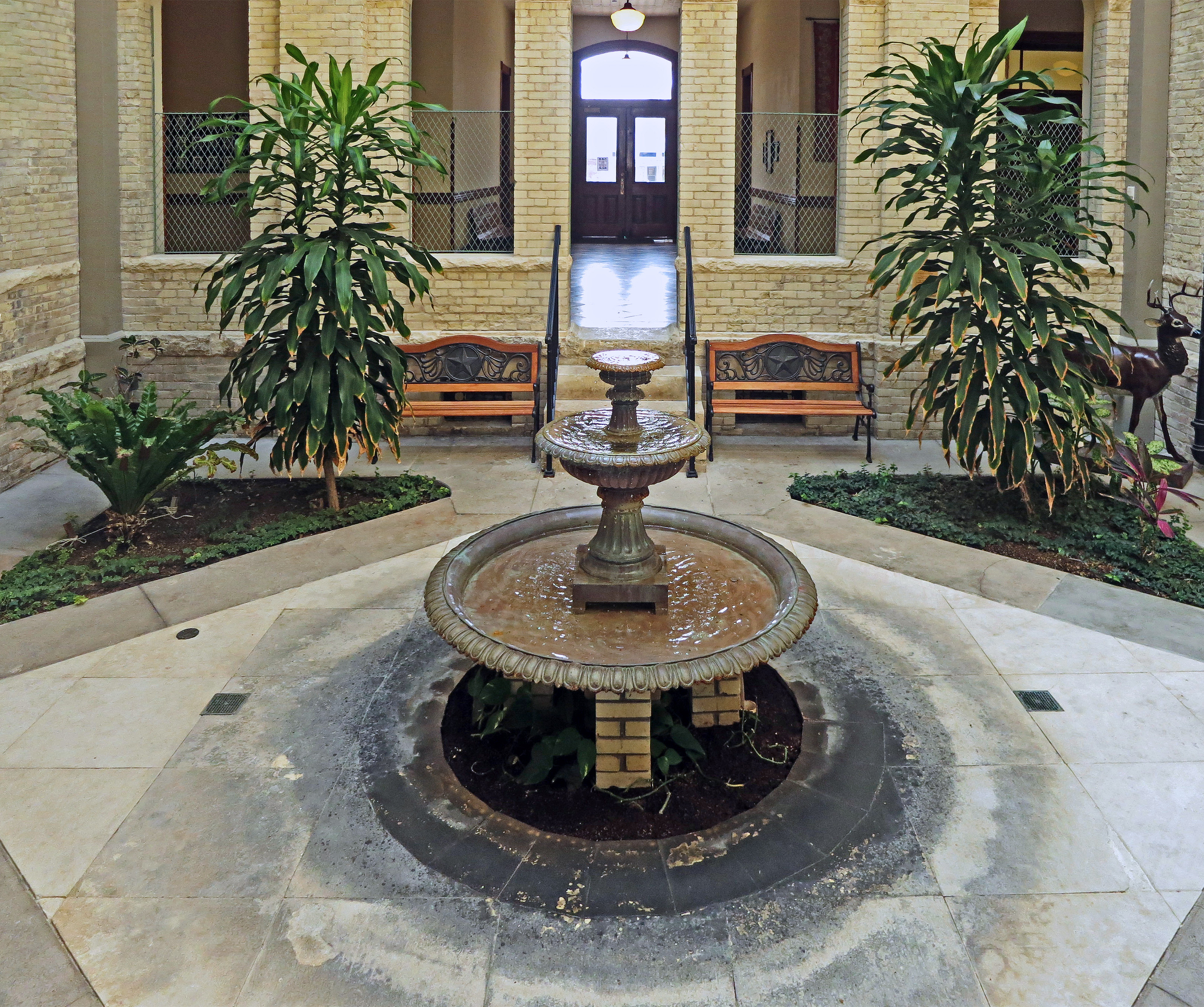
Courthouse atrium (2015)

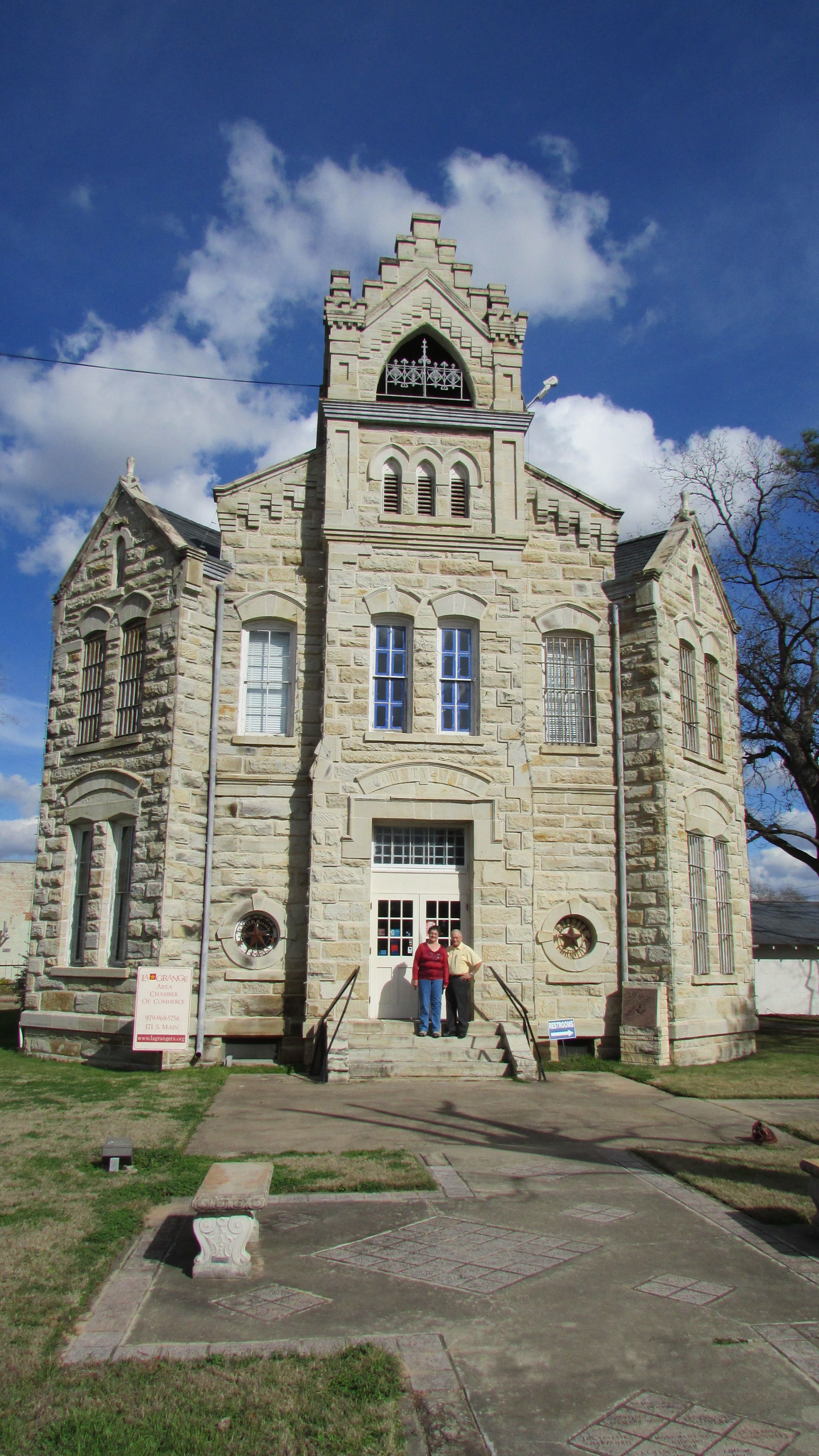
Jail facade (2013)
Photography: Larry D. Moore (2006); tap houston (2007); LeannMcClain (2013); Jim Evans (2015); Renelibrary (2017).
