= Henry Hirshfeld House and Cottage =

Historic house in Texas, United States

- U.S. National Register of Historic Places
- Recorded Texas Historic Landmark
- Texas State Antiquities Landmark
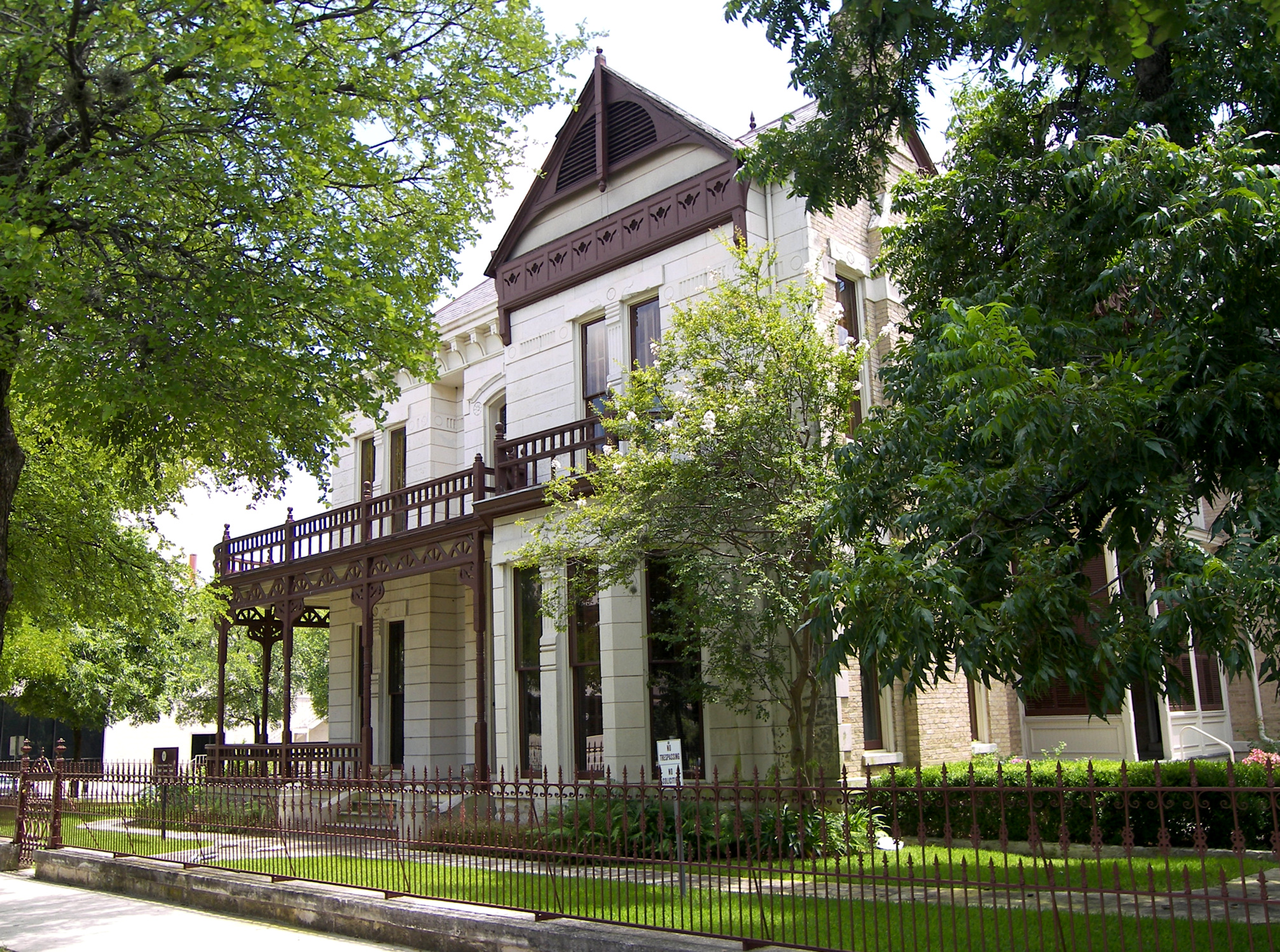
- The Hirshfield House in 2007
- Location: Austin, Texas, USA
- Coordinates: 30°16′17″N 97°44′40″W
- Built: 1873 and 1885
- Architect: John Andrewartha (1885)
- NRHP reference No.: 73001978
- RTHL No.: 64406441
- TSAL No.: 615

Significant dates
- Added to NRHP: April 13, 1973
- Designated RTHL: 1962
- Designated TSAL: 5/28/1981

The Henry Hirshfeld House and Cottage are two historic homes in downtown Austin, Texas, United States, originally inhabited by the prominent Hirshfeld family. The cottage, built in 1873, housed Henry and his wife Jennie until the larger house, designed by local architect John Andrewartha, was built in 1885. The homes have been well preserved and today house the Office of Governmental Relations for the Texas A&M University System. The buildings are located at 303 and 305 W. 9th Street. The buildings were added together to the National Register of Historic Places in 1973.
