= Fayette County Courthouse Square Historic District =

- U.S. National Register of Historic Places
- U.S. Historic district
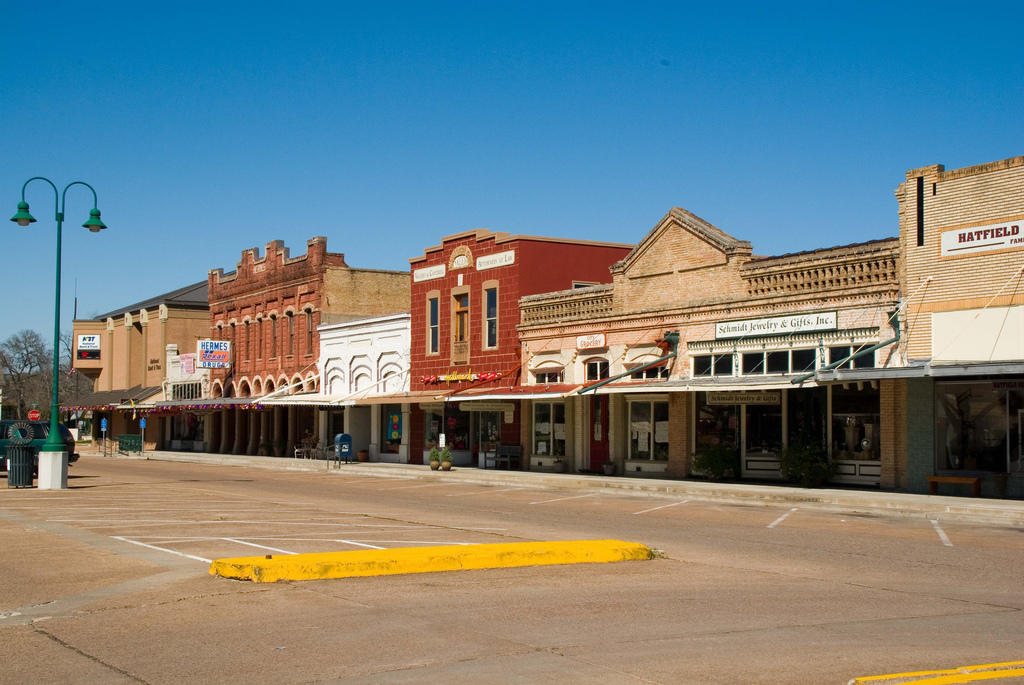
- Downtown La Grange in 2007

- Location within Texas Location within the United States
- Location: La Grange, Texas
- Coordinates: 29°54′17″N 96°52′39″W
- Area: 24 acres (9.7 ha)
- Built: 1856–1947
- Architectural style: Romanesque, Early Commercial, late 19th and early 20th century American movements
- NRHP reference No.: 00001664
- Added to NRHP: 16 January 2001

The Fayette County Courthouse Square Historic District in La Grange, Texas is a historic district roughly bounded by Main, Lafayette, Franklin, Colorado, Jefferson, Washington, and Crockett Streets. It was listed on the National Register of Historic Places on January 16, 2001. Two notable buildings in the district are the Fayette County Courthouse and Jail. Forty–seven buildings, three structures and four objects were identified as contributing to the historic nature of the district.

== Contributing properties ==
A partial list of contributing properties:

- Fayette County Courthouse (1891)
- Fayette County Jail (1881)
- Masonic Lodge No.34 A.F. & A.M. (1860)
- Grassmeyer Building (1856–1859)
- Moore Grocery / Reichert Furniture Store (1880)
- Post Office and Bank Building (1884)
- Ehler's Cotton Company (1927)
- Hermes Building (1906–7)
- U.S. Post Office (1936–7)
- Missouri-Kansas-Texas Railroad Depot (1897)

== See also ==
- National Register of Historic Places listings in Fayette County, Texas

== Photo gallery ==
Pictures of the Fayette County Courthouse Square Historic District
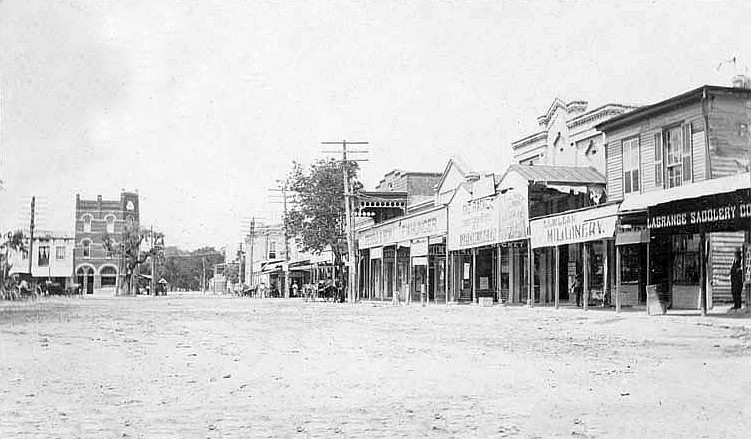
Downtown La Grange looking northwest up N. Washington St. (postcard from c. 1908)

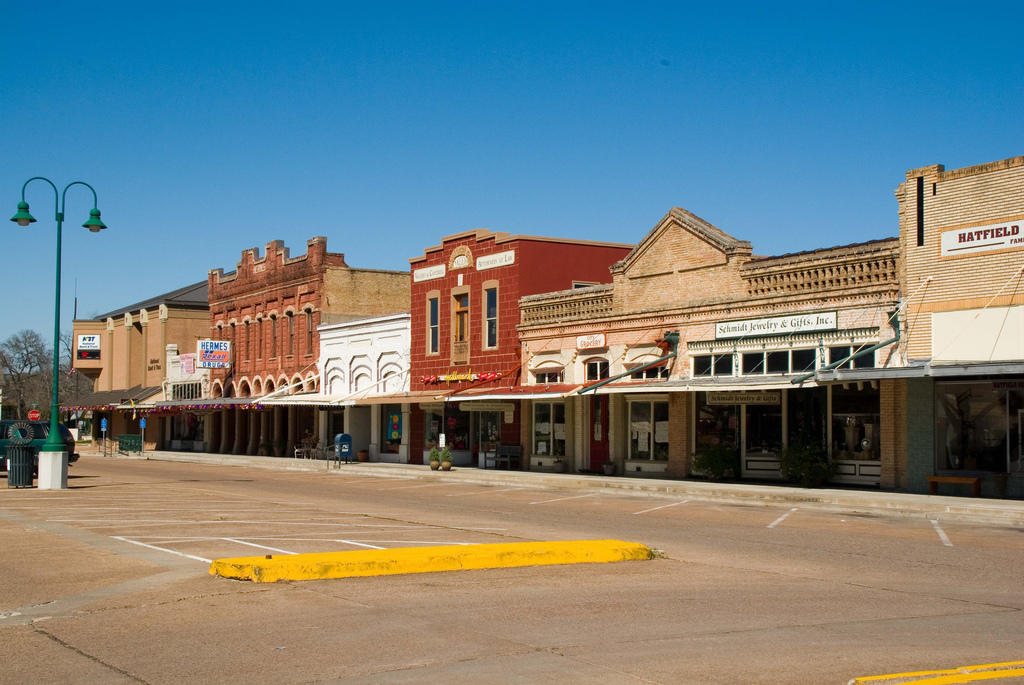
1906–7 Hermes Bldg. on N. Washington St. (left) has a modern Rexall sign for the Hermes Drug Store (2007)

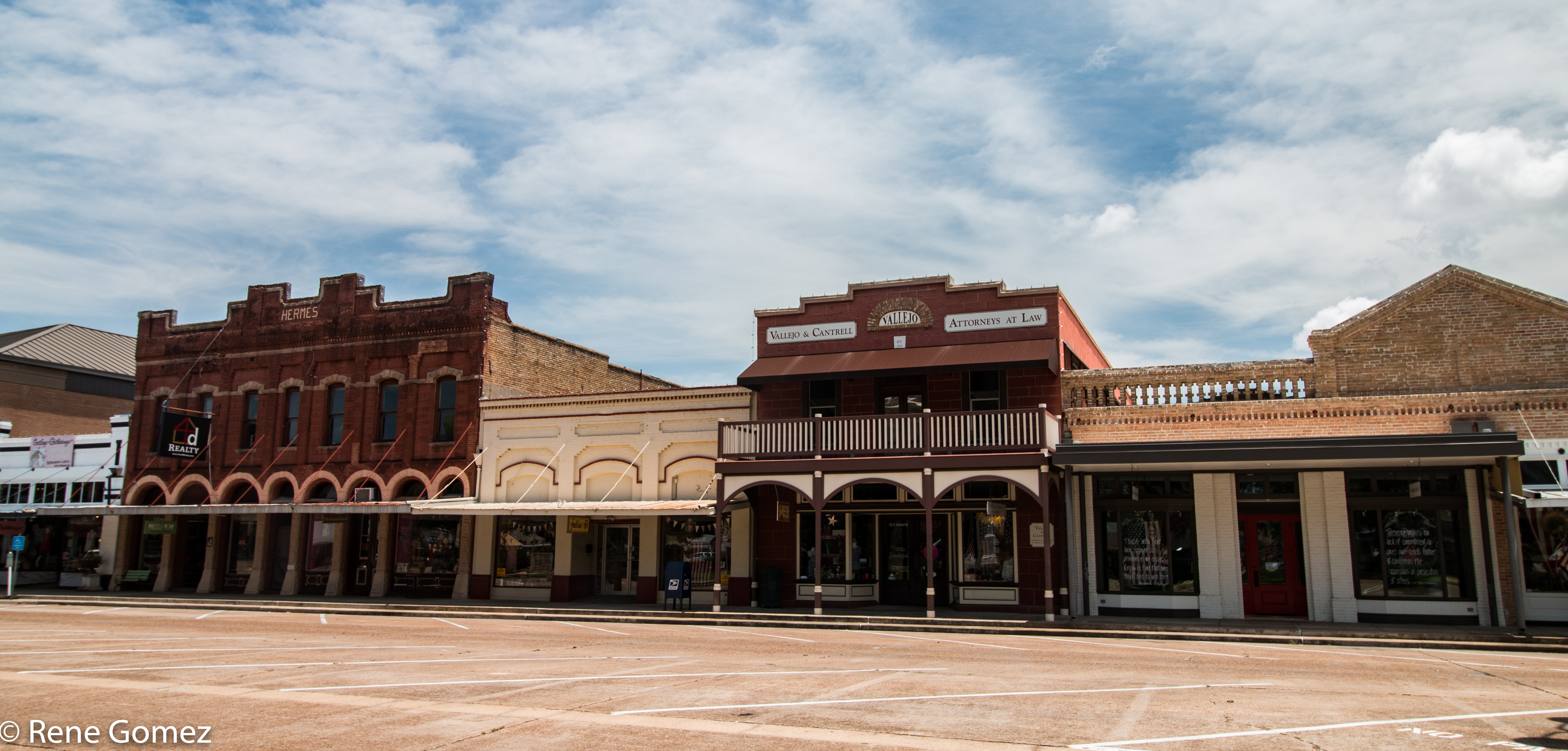
The scalloped parapet of the 1906–7 Hermes Building (left) displays the family name (2017)

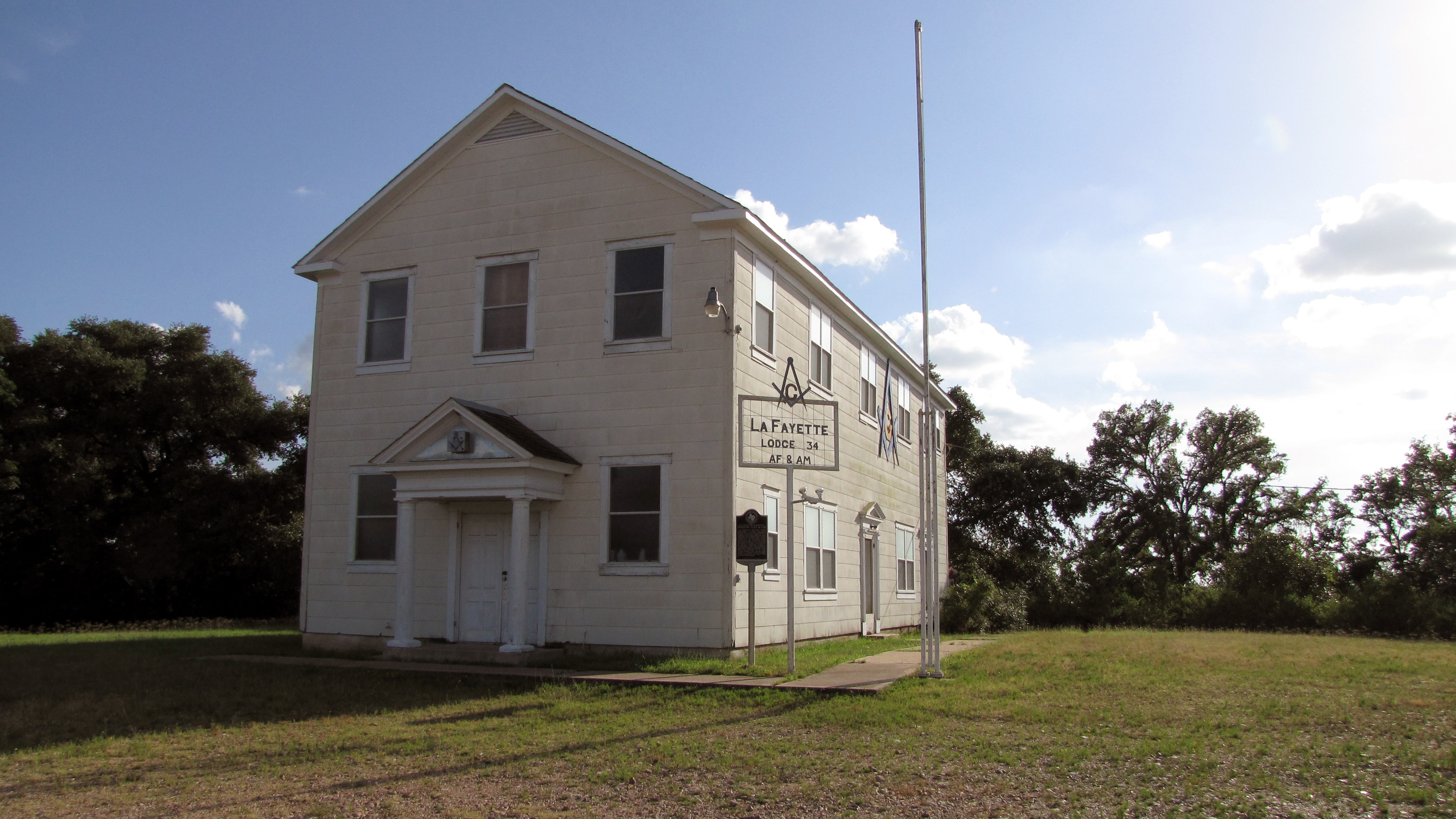
1860 Masonic Lodge No.34 A.F. & A.M. facade southeast elevation (2016a)

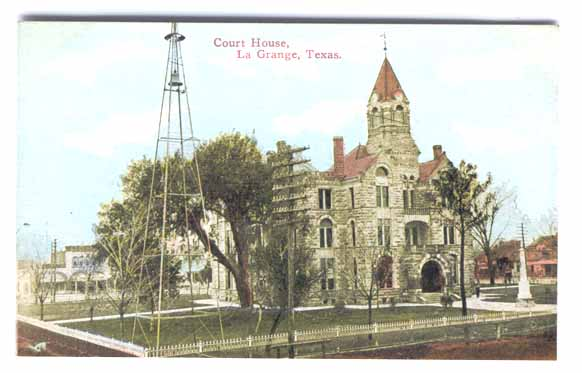
1891 Courthouse facade shown on postcard from c. 1910

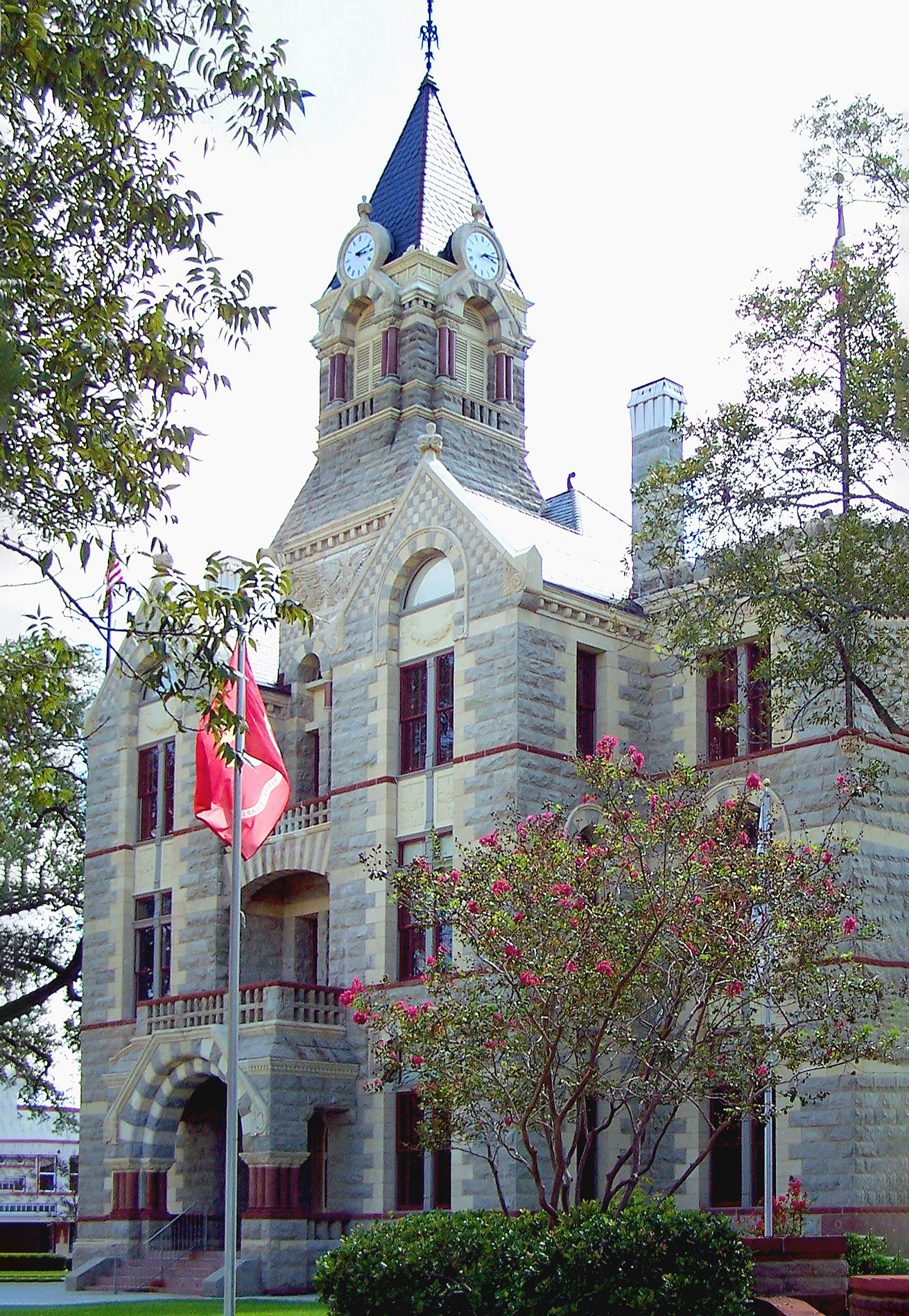
Courthouse facade from northeast (2006)

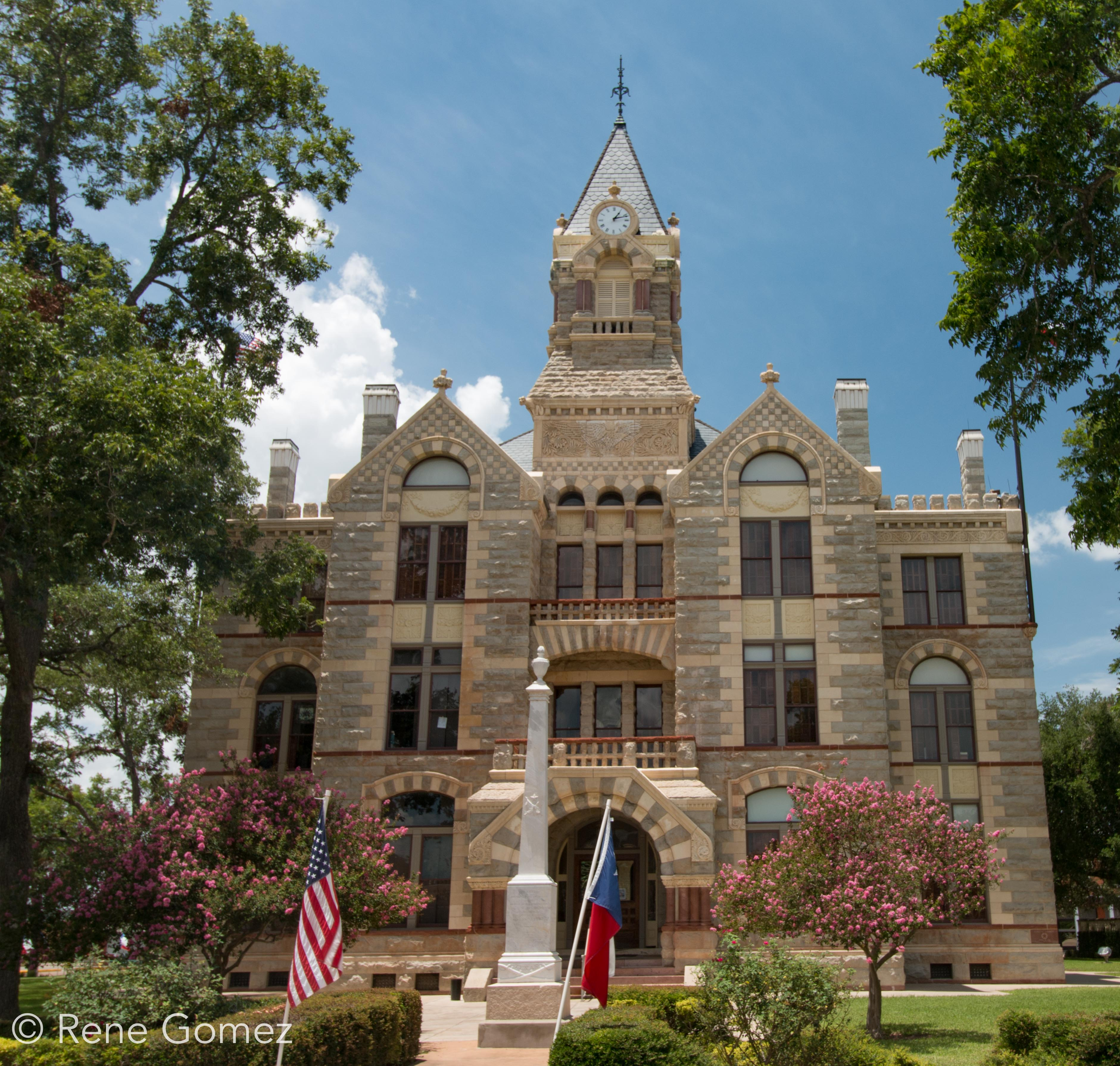
Courthouse facade, east elevation (2017)

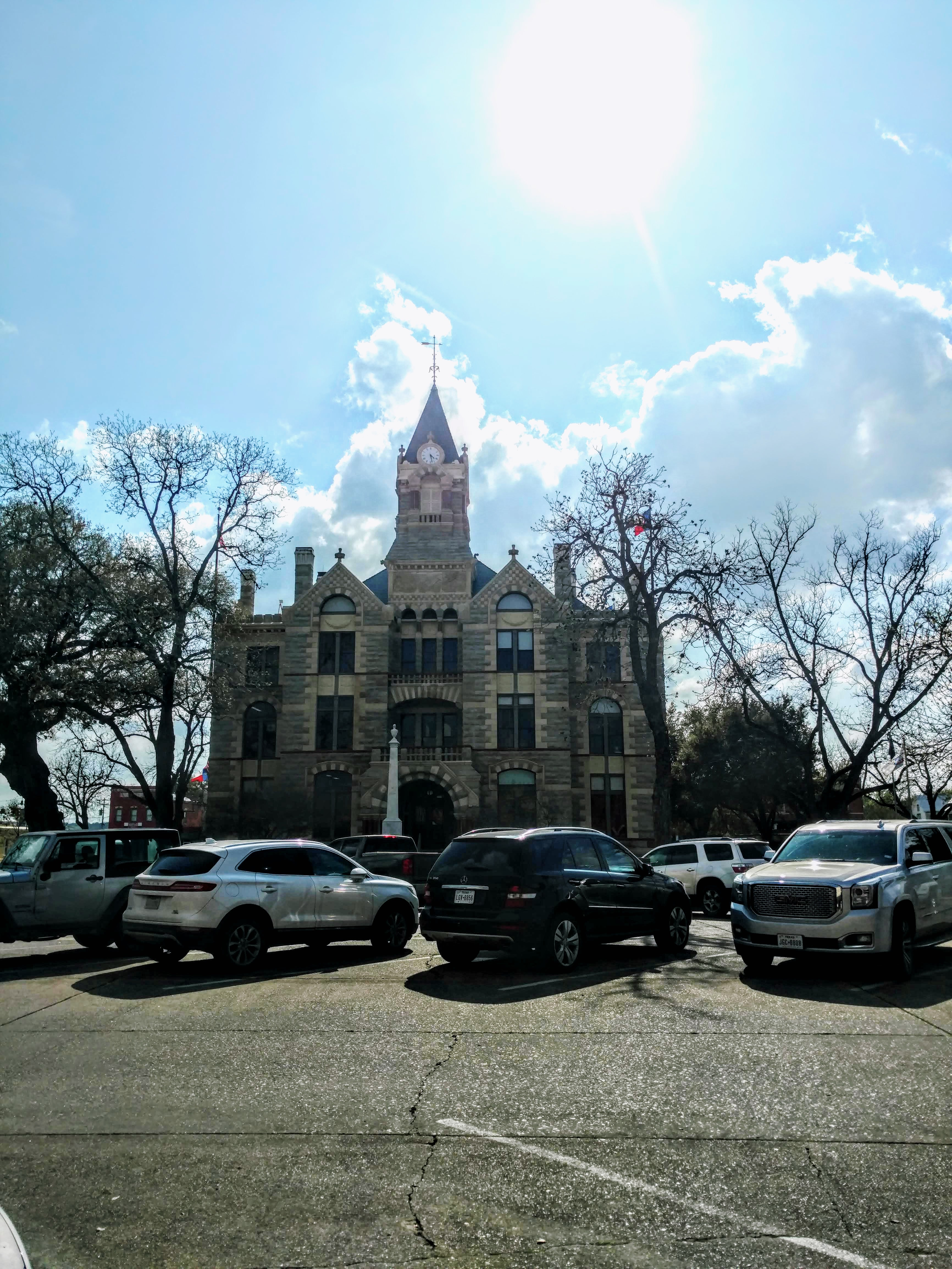
Courthouse facade (2019)

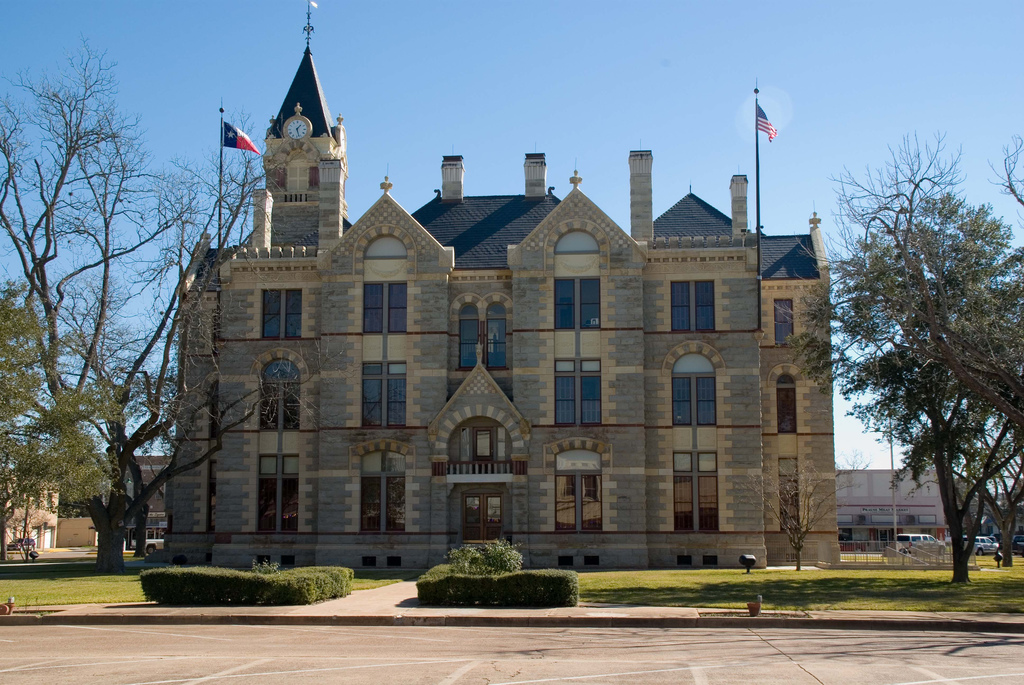
1891 Fayette County Courthouse north elevation (2007)

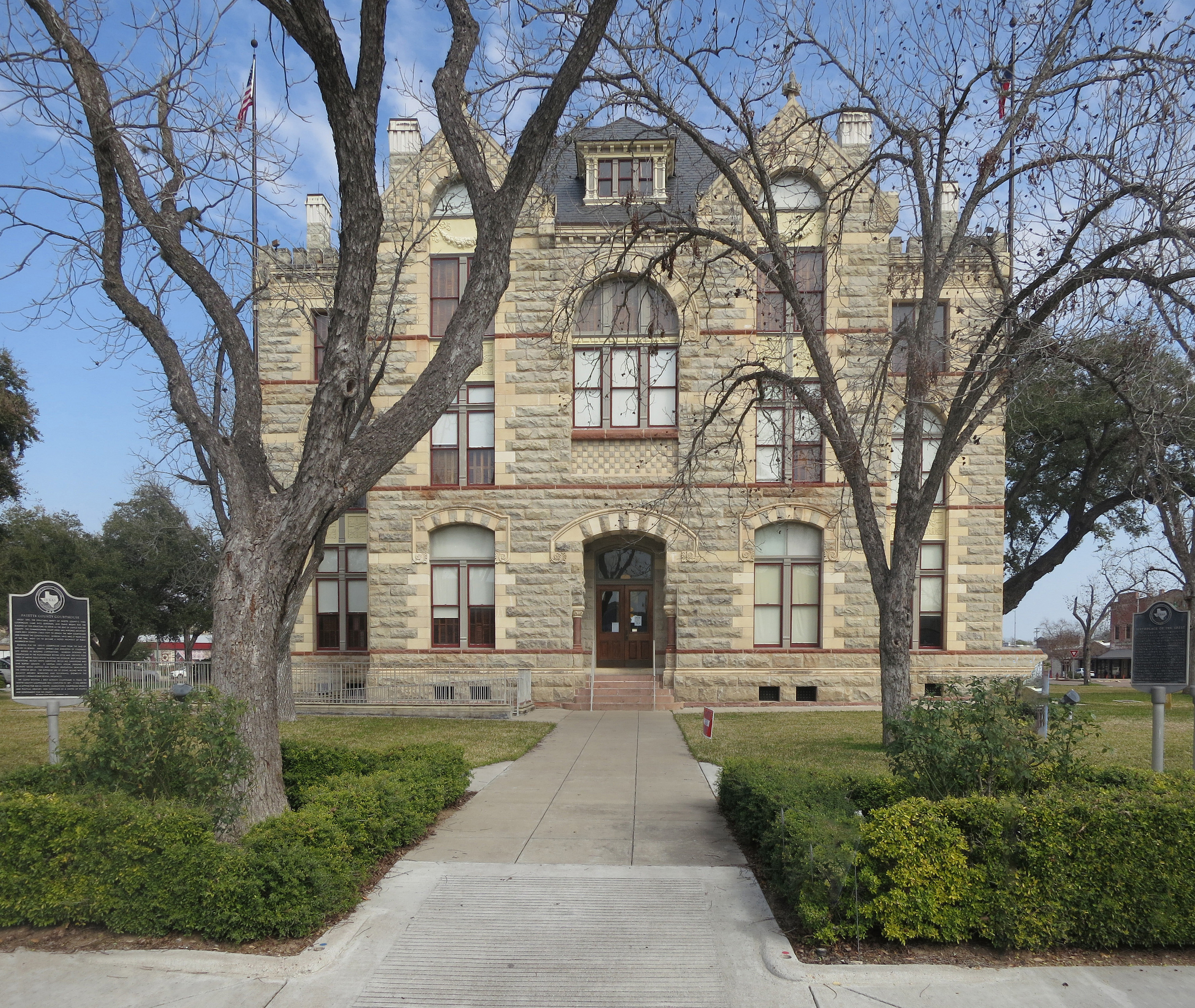
1891 Courthouse rear, west elevation (2015)

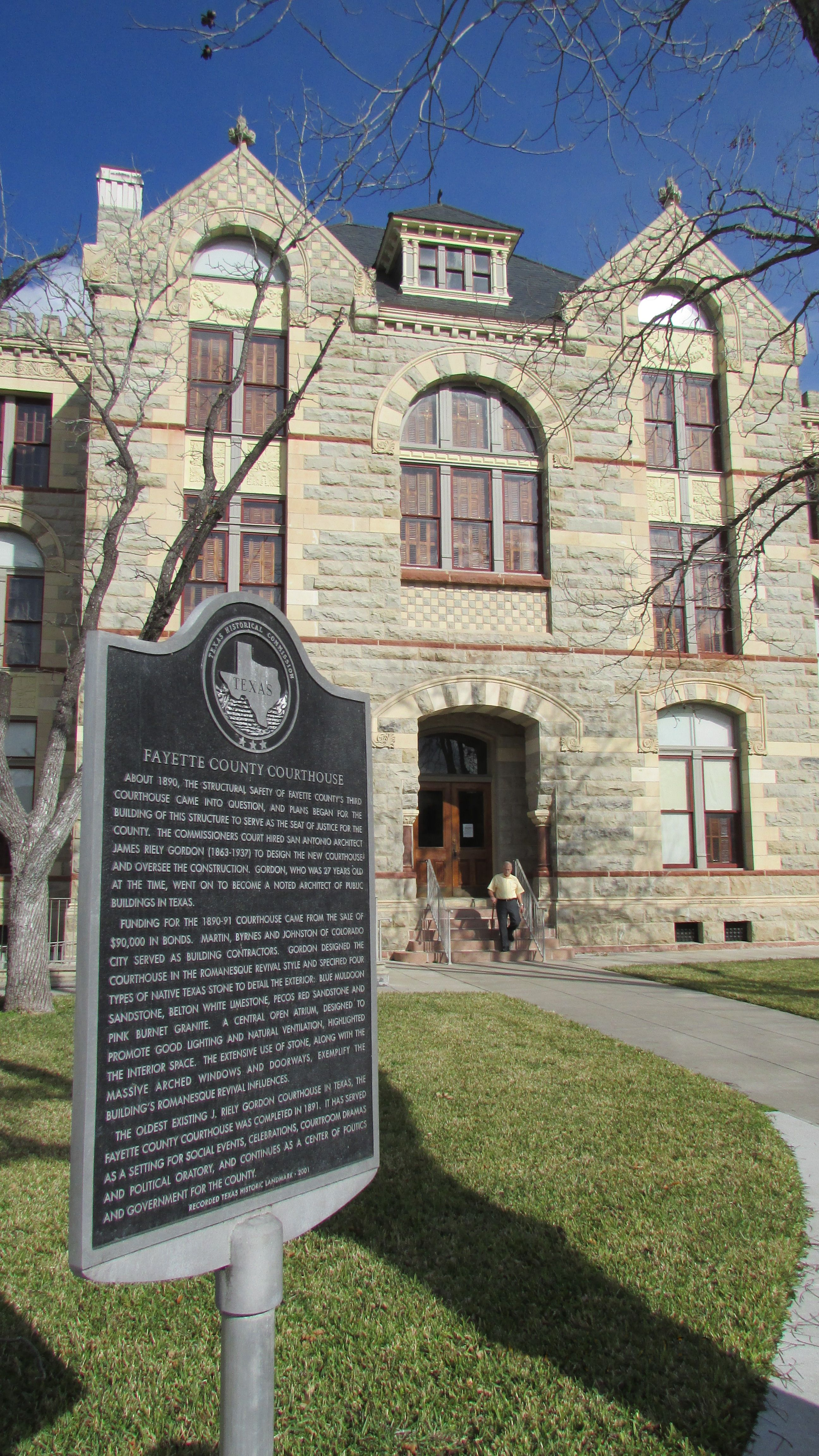
Courthouse rear from northwest (2013)

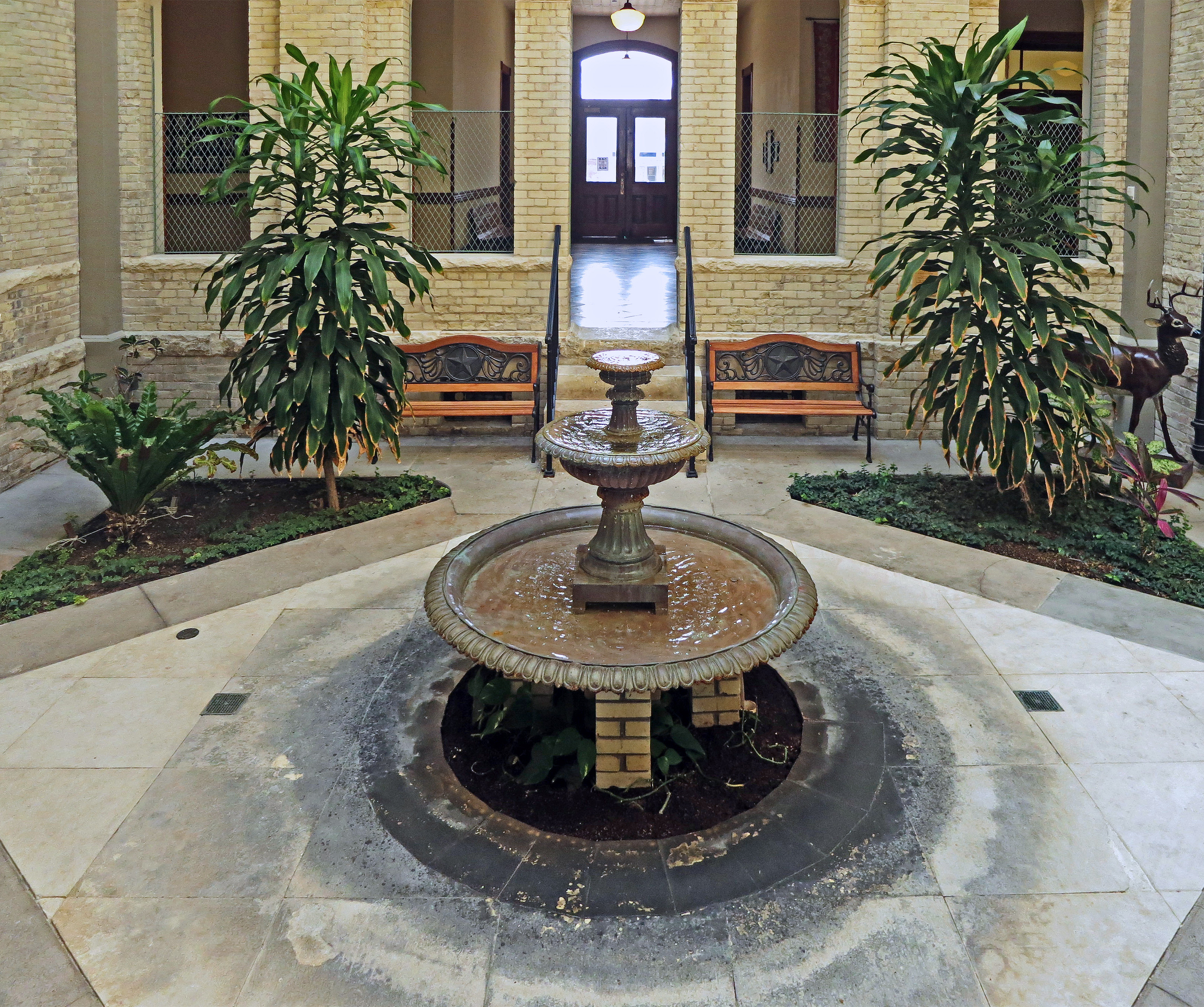
Courthouse atrium (2015)

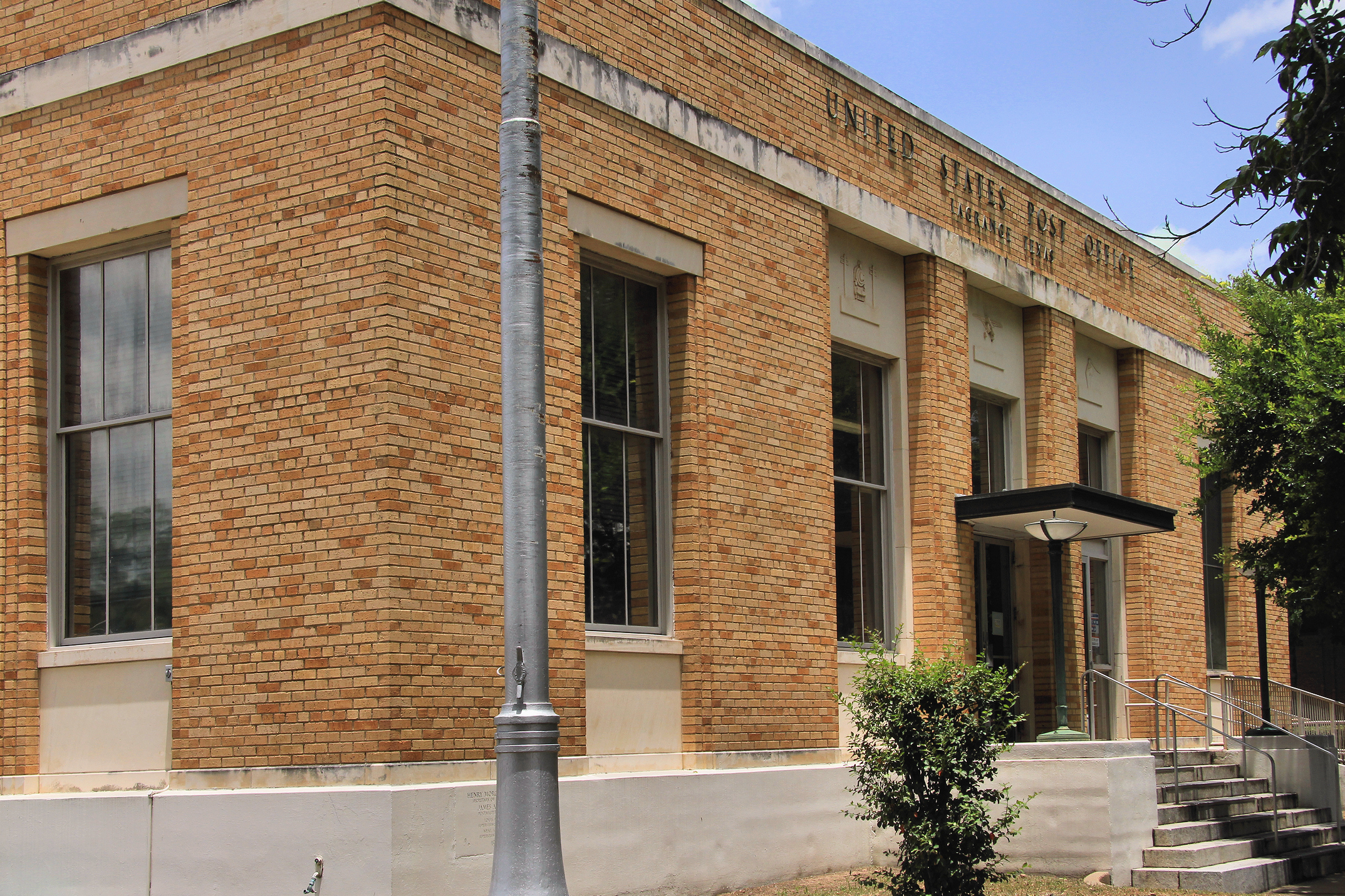
1936–7 U.S. Post Office facade looking northeast (2014)

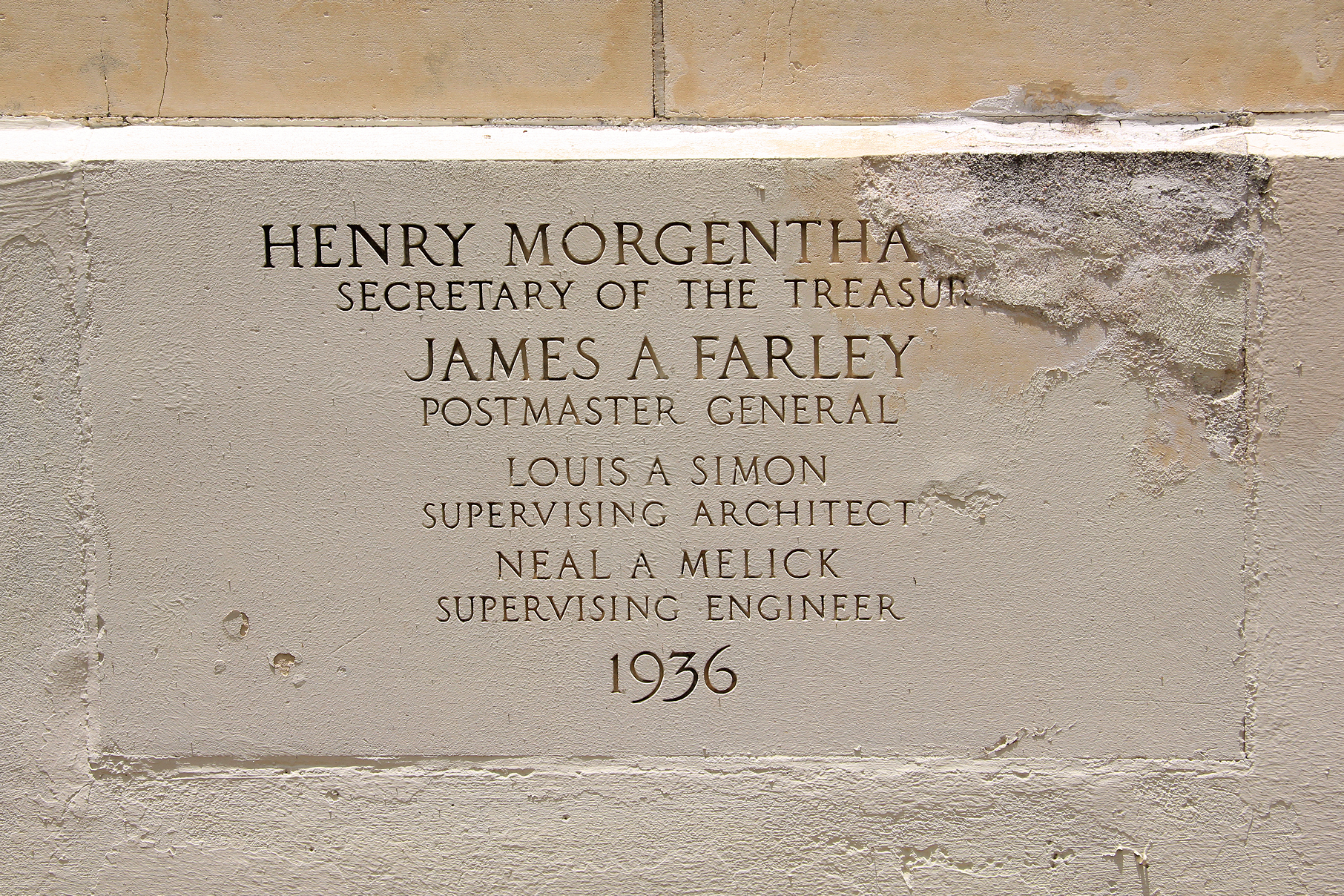
1936–7 U.S. Post Office cornerstone (2014)

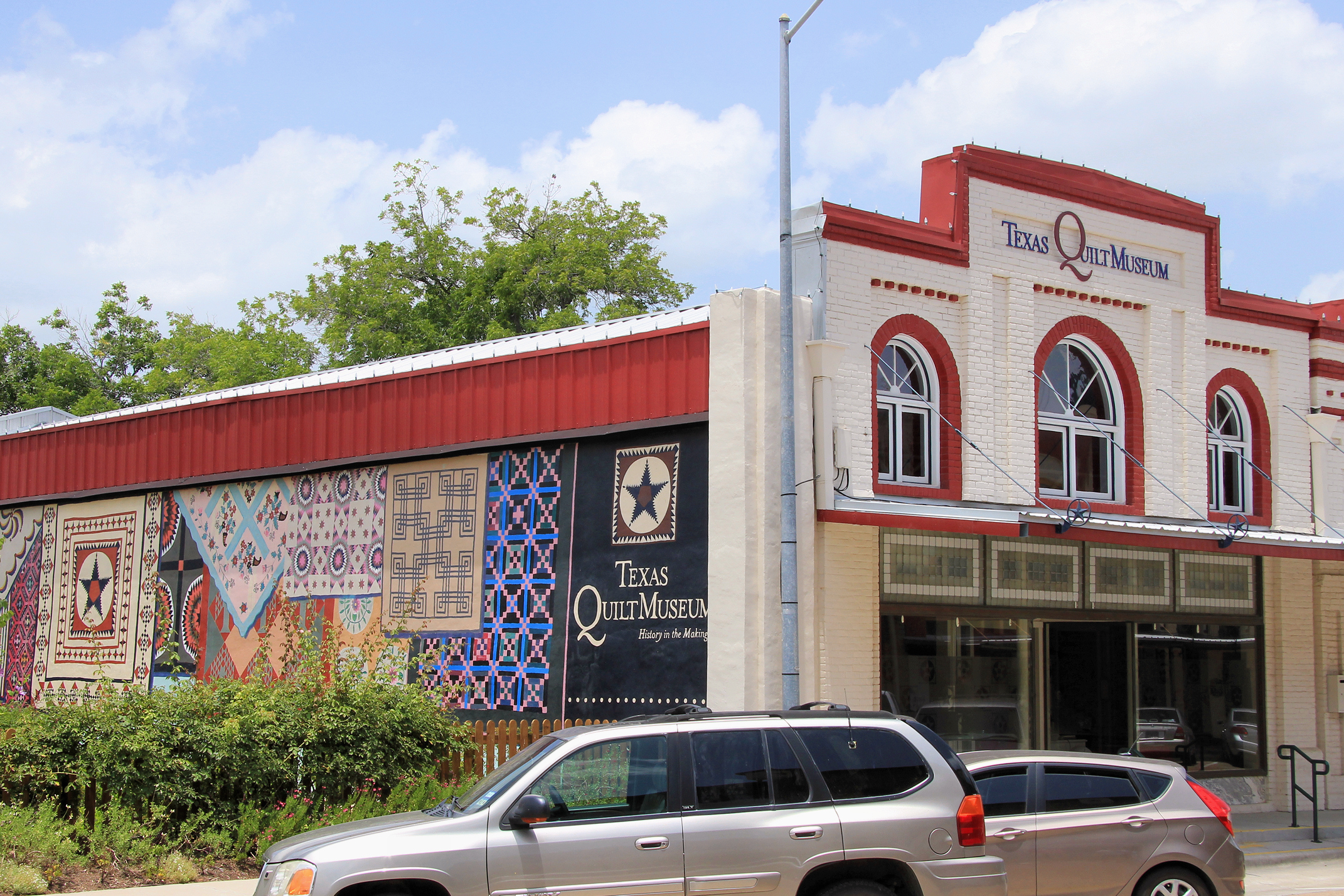
The Texas Quilt Museum downtown La Grange (2014)

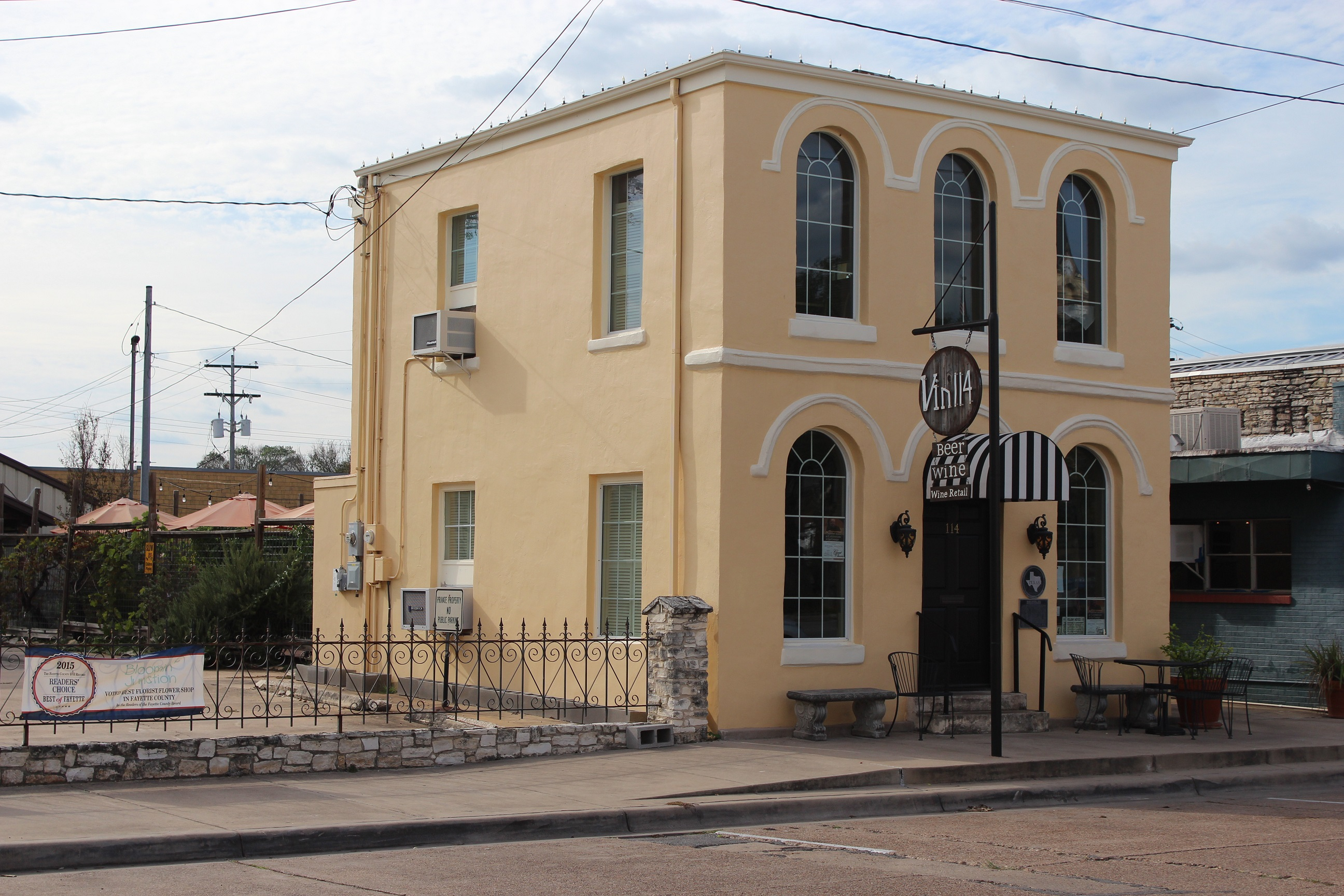
The 1856–9 Grassmeyer Building one of the oldest extant (2016b)

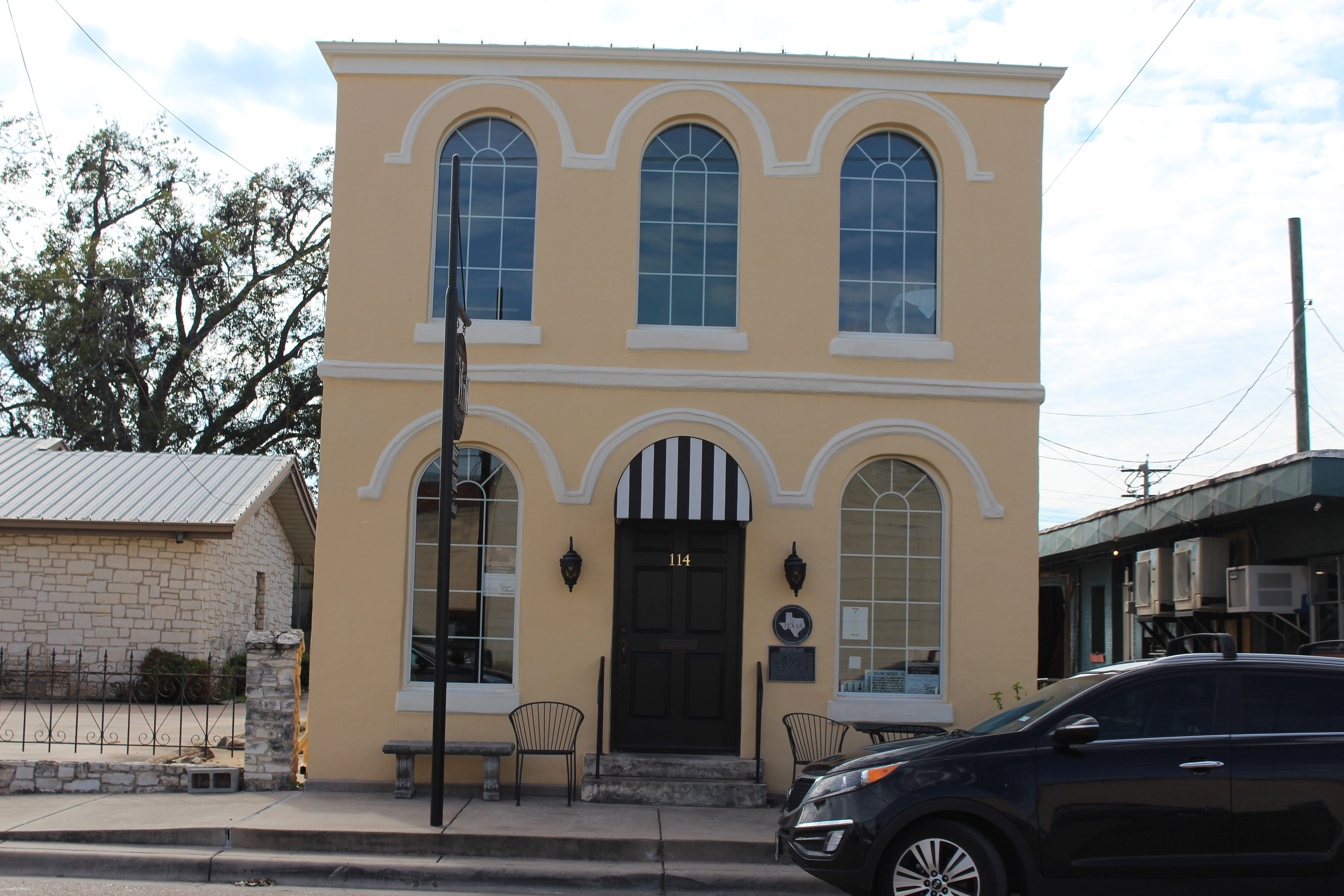
1856–9 Grassmeyer Building facade, northeast elevation (2016b)

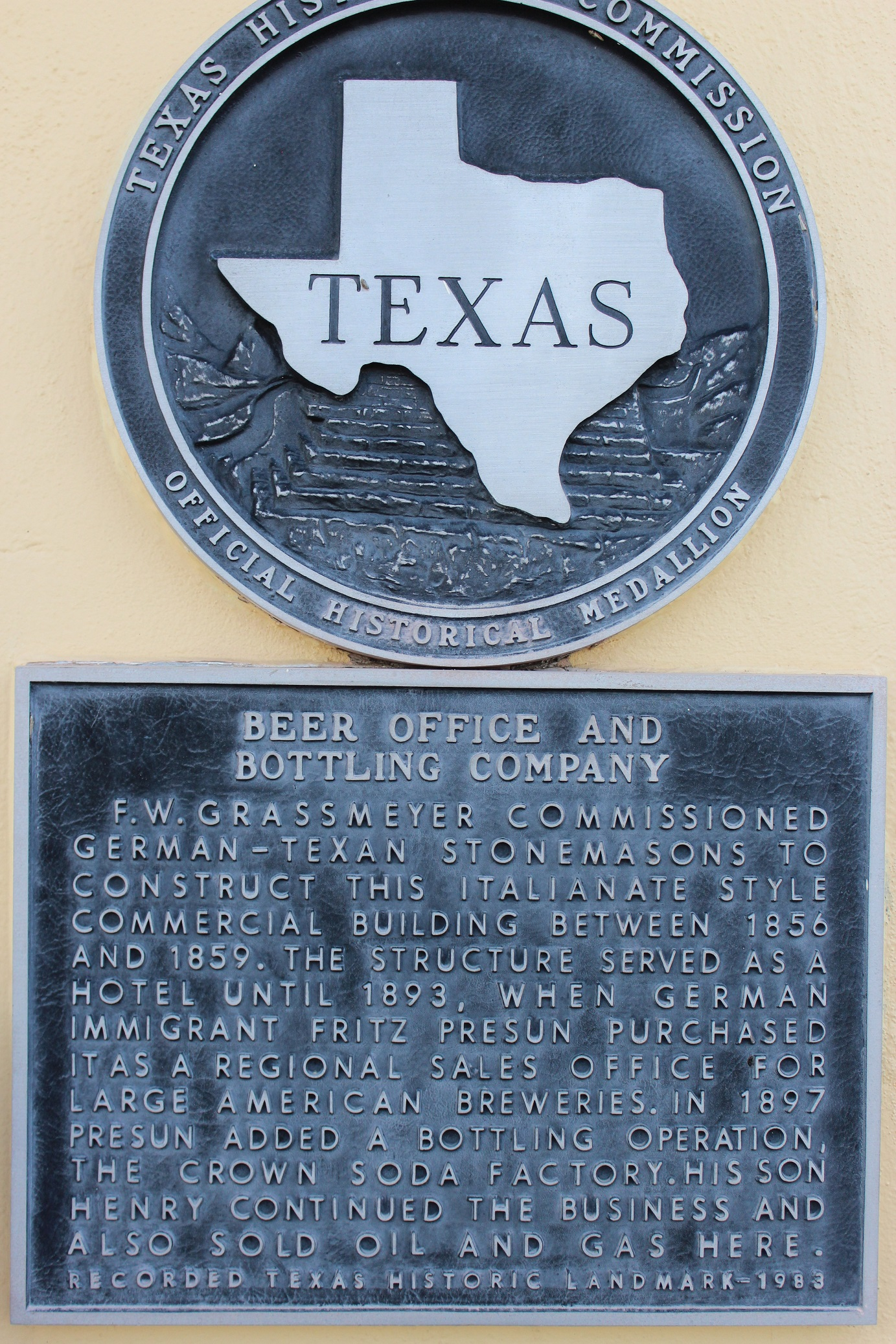
Grassmeyer Building historic marker (2016b)

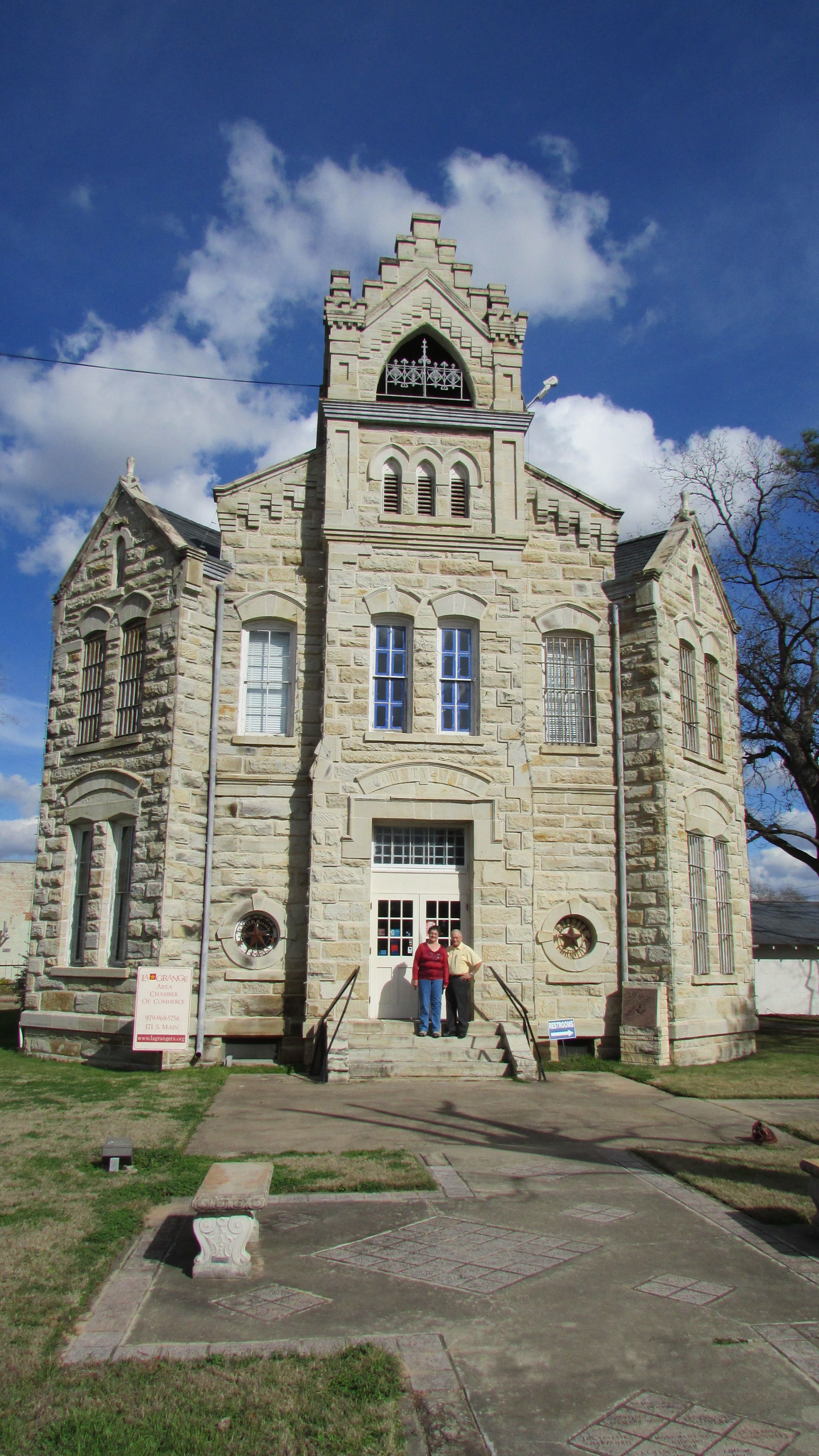
1881 Jail facade, southwest elevation (2013)
Photography: Larry D. Moore (2006); tap houston (2007); LeannMcClain (2013); Larry D. Moore (2014); Jim Evans (2015); QuesterMark (2016a); Darrylpearson (2016b); Renelibrary (2017); Skibjm08 (2019).
