= John Andrewartha =

English architect and civil engineer

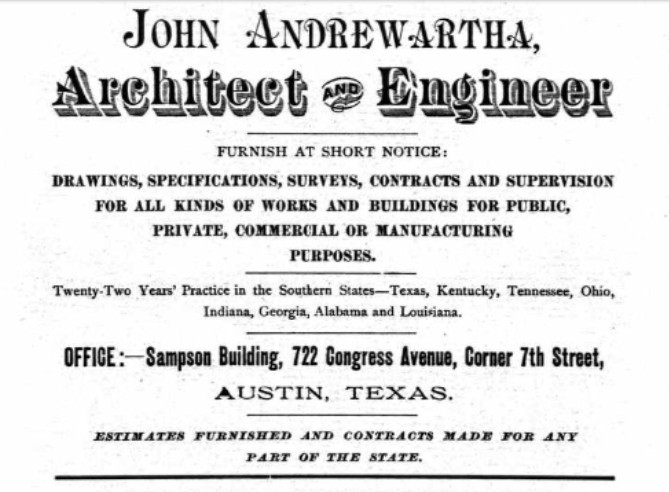

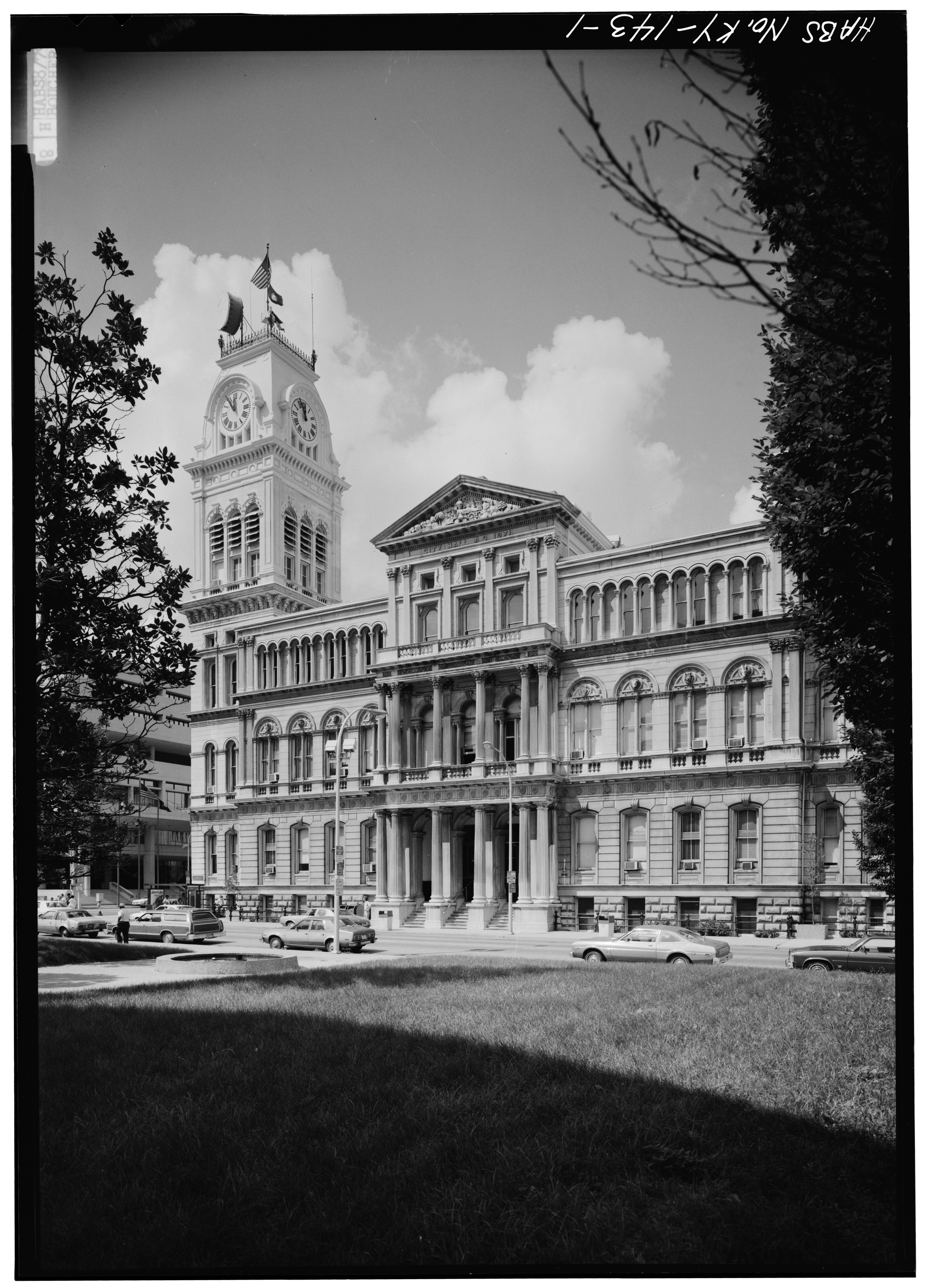

John Andrewartha (25 August 1839 – 7 November 1916) was an English architect and civil engineer.

== Early life and education ==
John Andrewartha was born at Falmouth, Cornwall, the son of William Guy and Sarah Elizabeth Andrewartha. He trained as an engineer in the Royal Navy.

== Career ==
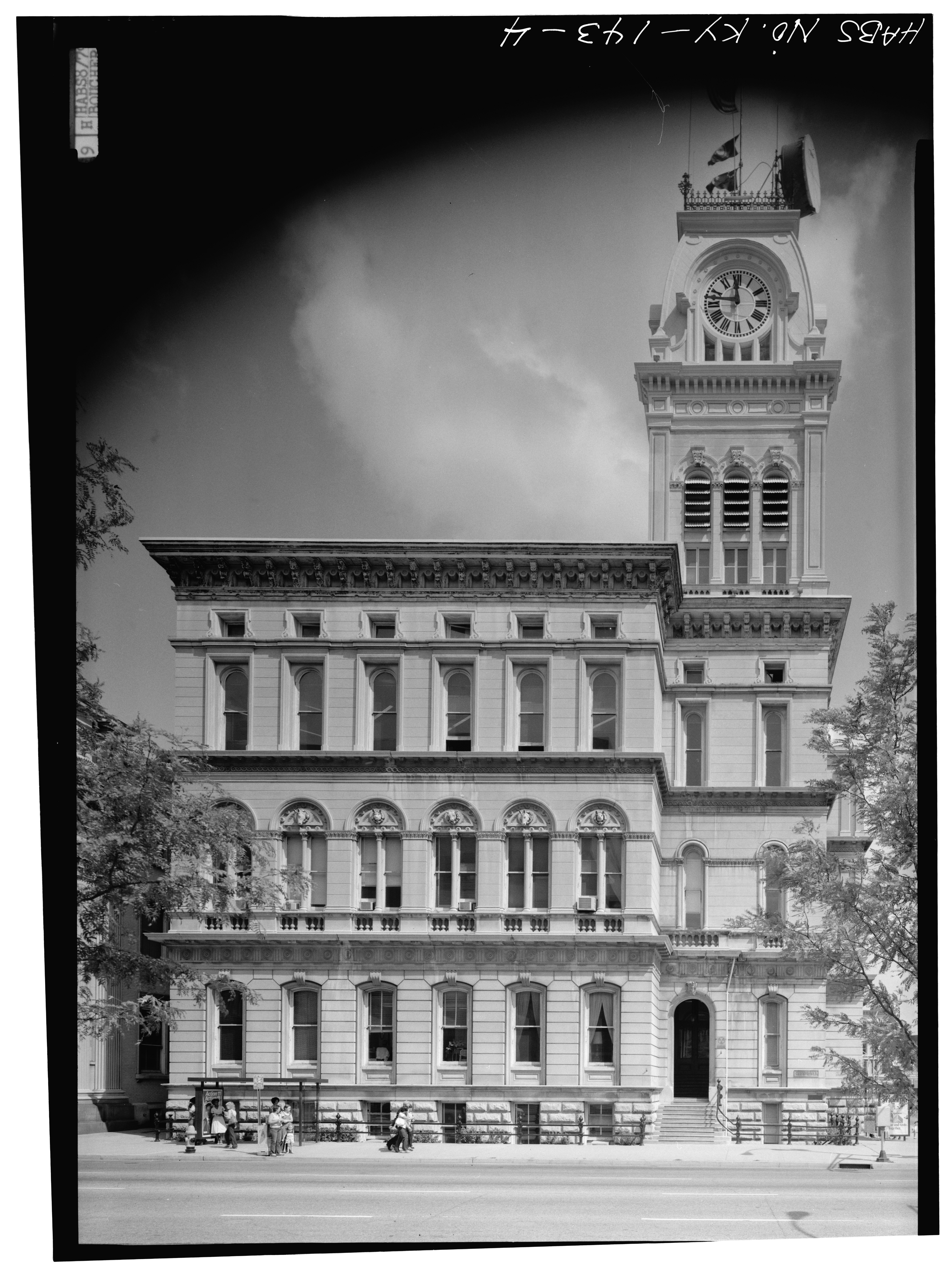
City Hall, Louisville KY, designed by Andrewartha

Andrewartha began working in the United States in 1865, first based in Louisville, Kentucky, and after 1881 in Austin, Texas. In Kentucky his firm won a design contest in 1866 for the Louisville City Hall. The city's Courier-Journal Building was also his design; it burned down in 1979. Andrewartha also designed the original entrance lodge, stables, clubhouse, and other structures at Churchill Downs, though they have all since been replaced.

In 1872, Andrewartha and two others (the contractor and the site foreman) were charged with manslaughter after the fatal collapse of the Pettit Building in Louisville. But in late 1873, he was listed as the architect for the building of the Fourth Kentucky Lunatic Asylum project.

Among his varied completed projects in Texas were the Austin City-County Hospital (1884), the first public hospital in Texas; the St. John's Home for Negro Orphans in East Austin (1911), the original Montopolis Bridge over the Colorado River (which was washed away in a 1935 flood), and Austin residences such as the Henry Hirschfeld House, which is on the National Register of Historic Places.

== Personal life ==
Andrewartha married Jemima Louisa Whillier on 11 June 1861 in Alverstoke, Hampshire, England. They had twelve children together; seven of their children lived to adulthood. John was widowed when Jemima died in May 1915 at their home in Austin, Texas; he died the following year, aged 77 years.
