= School supply store =

Store that sells school equipment

School supply stores sell teaching resources for parents, teachers and homeschoolers. These stores frequently carry a wide selection of educational materials and decorations for classroom teachers such as books pencils pens and many other supplies. A teacher store or learning store is often a member of the National School Supply and Equipment Association.
