= McIntosh Lake =

McIntosh Lake may refer to:

- McIntosh Lake (Washington), a lake in Washington state, U.S.
- McIntosh Lake (Saskatchewan), a lake in Saskatchewan, Canada
- Chief McIntosh Lake, a reservoir in Butts County, Georgia, U.S.
- Lake McIntosh, a reservoir near Peachtree City, Georgia, U.S.
