= Carole Marsh =

American writer

Carole Marsh is a children's author and the founder of Gallopade International, a children's book publishing company headquartered in Peachtree City, GA. Marsh writes mystery fiction in addition to works of non-fiction for children. Initially, she self-published under the imprint Gallopade Publishing Group, which she founded in 1979; today, Gallopade International is a major small publisher based in Peachtree City, Georgia.

In 2007 Marsh received the Georgia Author of the Year award for her contributions to children's literature and to the state of Georgia over her career.

Gallopade International specializes in social studies, with an emphasis on history, geography, and biographies correlated to educational standards, including the Common Core.

== Awards ==
- Mimi and Papa's Everyday Amazing Almanac received the 2012 Seal of Excellence from Creative Child Magazine.
- WHEN KIDS TAKE OVER NASA by Carole Marsh was selected as a finalist in the 2011 Book of the Year Awards from ForeWord Magazine.
- Mary America, First Girl President of the United States received the 2012 Teacher's Choice Award for the Family from Learning Magazine, as well as the Book of the Year Award from Creative Child Magazine.
- The Daily Dozen, a digital whiteboard program, won the 2012 Teacher's Choice Award for the Classroom from Learning Magazine.
- Marsh's Budget Buddies, a six-book classroom management series, won the 2011 Teacher's Choice Award for the Classroom from Learning Magazine.
- Marsh received the Georgia Author of the Year Award from the Georgia Writers Association in 2007.
- Marsh was a 2001 recipient of the Excellence in Education Award from the National School Supply and Equipment Association

== Career ==
- Marsh has more than 25 pages of title listings in “Children’s Books in Print” and is creator and author of “Real Kids/Real Places” Mysteries, called “a true gem of original, informative, and entertaining storytelling” by Midwest Book Review; recipient of 2002 Teacher's Choice Award by Learning Magazine
- Marsh is the creator and author of Around the World in 80 Mysteries series, Pretty Darn Scary Mysteries, Criss/Cross/Applesauce Mysteries, Three Amigos Mysteries, Masters of Disasters Mysteries, Fantasy Field Trip Mysteries, The Postcard Mysteries, and Awesome Mysteries
- Marsh is also creator of the Daily Dozen Classroom Almanac and a variety of educational series, including: Elections! Elections! Elections; American Milestones; Black Jazz, Pizzazz & Razzmatazz African American History Series; 1,000 Readers Biographies Series; Hispanic Heritage Books for Kids; Native American Heritage Books for Kids; Patriotic Favorites Series; Here & Now Books for Kids; Heroes & Helpers; Little Linguists Language Books and others
- Marsh is currently developing Carole Marsh's Georgia Careers Curriculum. The first six titles in the series, aimed at high school students, have a release date set in September 2012.
