= Nipew Lake =

Lake in Saskatchewan, Canada

- Dead Lake
- Location in Saskatchewan Nipew Lake (Canada)
- Location: Northern Administration District, Saskatchewan
- Coordinates: 55.6667°N 105.0442°W
- Part of: Churchill River drainage basin
- Primary inflows: Churchill River
- Primary outflows: Churchill River
- Basin countries: Canada
- Surface area: 2,707 ha (6,690 acres)
- Shore length^{1}: 125 km (78 mi)
- Islands: Boyes Island; Boyle Island; Wanahichewun Island
- Settlements: None
- ^{1} Shore length is not a well-defined measure.

Nipew Lake, also known as Dead Lake, is a lake along the course of the Churchill River in the Canadian province of Saskatchewan. The Churchill River is largely a series of interconnected lakes that begins at Churchill Lake in north-western Saskatchewan and empties into the Hudson Bay at Churchill, Manitoba. Upstream from Nipew Lake is Torrance Lake and downstream is Hayman Lake. The lake about 64 kilometres (40 mi) east-northeast of the community of La Ronge and is surrounded by boreal forest in the Canadian Shield. The climate is subarctic.

== Description ==
Nipew Lake is a large lake along the course of the Churchill River with an area of 2,707 hectares (6,690 acres) and a 125-kilometre (78 mi) long shoreline. There are no communities on the lake and no highway access.

Much of the lake's western shore is bounded by Wanahichewun Island. Farther upstream, at the western end of Wanahichewun Island, the Churchill River flows into Trout Lake. Trout Lake has two outflows that go around Wanahichewun Island. The main stem of the Churchill River flows out of Trout Lake to the south of the island while a branch of the river flows out to the north. The mainstem and the river branch reconverge at the eastern end of Wanahichewun Island and the western end of Nipew Lake. The northern branch flows through Stack Lake (where it is met by McIntosh Lake) and Mountney Lake en route to Nipew Lake while the main branch flows through Crew Lake and Torrance Lake.

The Churchill River flows out of Nipew Lake at the lake's eastern end. The Selby Peninsula marks the end of Nipew Lake as the Churchill continues eastward before flowing into Hayman Lake.

Two islands within the lake are named after men who lost their lives in World War II. The naming is part of Saskatchewan's geomemorial naming program that names geographical features after people who lost their lives in the service of Canada. Boyes Island is named after Harry Thomas Boyes who died in 1942. Boyle Island is named after Harry Vern Boyle who died in 1944. Both islands are at the eastern end of the lake.

== Fish species ==
Fish species commonly found in Nipew Lake include walleye, sauger, lake trout, northern pike, cisco, lake whitefish, and burbot.

== See also ==
- List of lakes of Saskatchewan
