= Black Bear Island Lake =

Lake in Saskatchewan, Canada

- Location in Saskatchewan Black Bear Island Lake (Canada)
- Location: Northern Administration District, Saskatchewan
- Group: Churchill River System
- Coordinates: 55.6334°N 105.6671°W
- Part of: Churchill River drainage basin
- Primary inflows: Churchill River
- River sources: Canadian Shield
- Primary outflows: Churchill River
- Basin countries: Canada
- Max. length: 40 km (25 mi)
- Surface area: 13,777 ha (34,040 acres)
- Max. depth: 41 m (135 ft)
- Shore length^{1}: 785 km (488 mi)
- Islands: Sturdy Island; Hadley Island; Wamninuta Island; Corman Island; Hagerty Island; Craik Island; Pine Island
- Settlements: None
- ^{1} Shore length is not a well-defined measure.

Black Bear Island Lake is a lake in the Canadian province of Saskatchewan. It is a large, irregularly shaped lake along the course of the Churchill River in the Canadian Shield. There are no communities along its shores and there is no road access. The lake is about 61 kilometres (38 mi) east-northeast from the village of Pinehouse. Towards the western end of the lake, near High Rock Narrows, there are Indigenous pictographs.

Much of the Churchill River, which flows west to east, is a series of interconnected lakes referred to as the Churchill River System. Black Bear Island Lake's inflow is from the adjoining Kinosaskaw Lake while its outflow is into Trout Lake. The outflow is marked by Birch Falls and Birch Portage.

There are two fly-in fishing outfitters on the lake — Black Bear Island Lodge and Pine Island Resort. There are also commercial guides and outfitters for canoe expeditions on the lake.

== Fishing outfitters ==
Black Bear Island Lodge is a fly-in fishing outfitters on the southern shore of the lake. Access is via a float plane that departs from La Ronge.

Near the eastern end of Black Bear Island Lake, on Pine Island, is Pine Island Resort. It is also a fly-in outfitters with float planes leaving Missinipe.

Fish commonly found in Black Bear Island Lake include northern pike and walleye.

== See also ==
- List of lakes of Saskatchewan
- Canadian canoe routes
- Tourism in Saskatchewan
