= Kelley O'Hara =

American soccer player (born 1988)

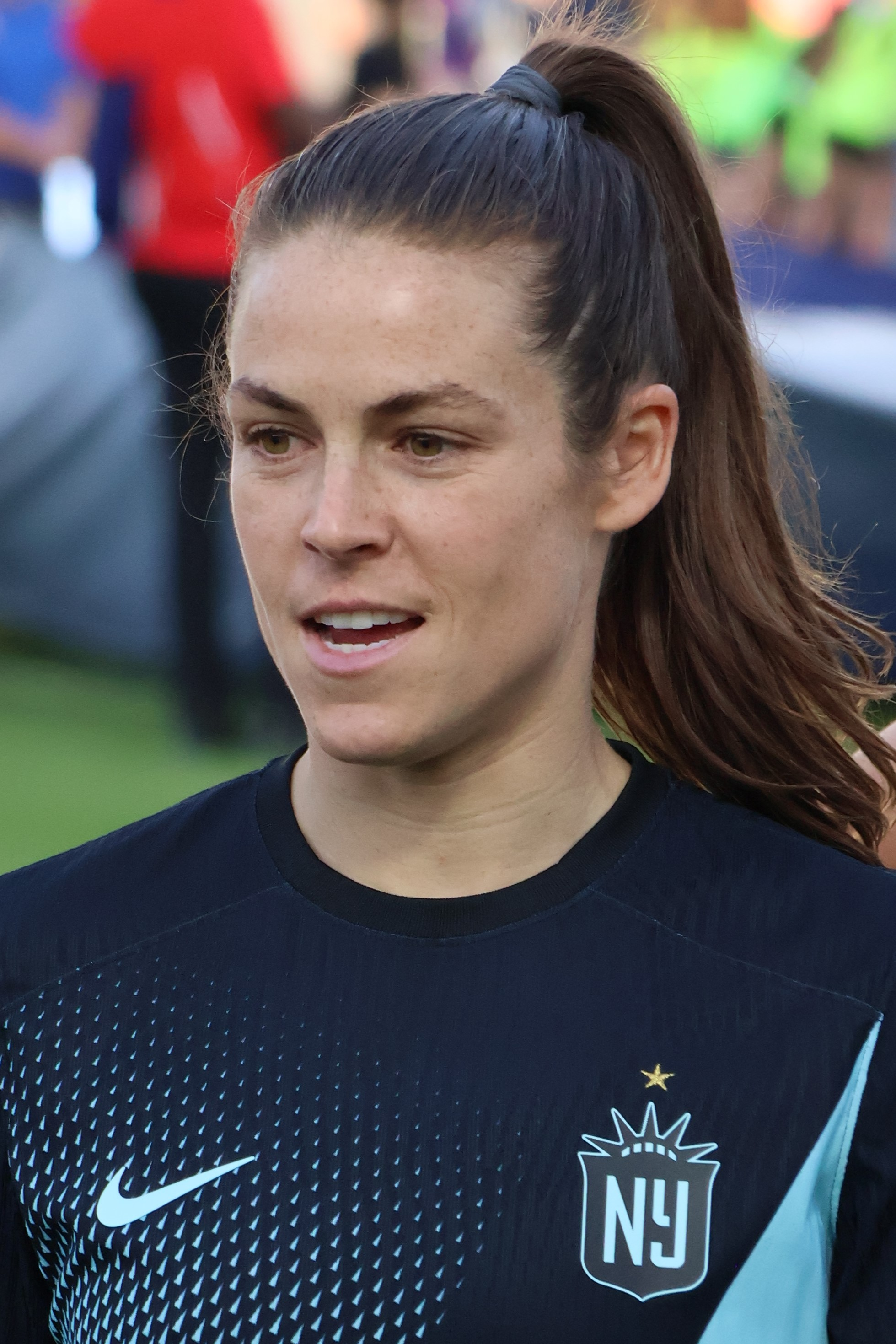
- O'Hara with Gotham FC in 2024

Personal information
- Full name: Kelley Maureen O'Hara
- Date of birth: August 4, 1988 (age 38)
- Place of birth: Peachtree City, Georgia, U.S.
- Height: 5 ft 5 in (1.65 m)
- Positions: Wingback; winger

Youth career
- 1997–1999: Peachtree City Lazers
- 2000–2001: Lightning Soccer Club
- 2002–2006: Starr's Mill High School
- 2007–2008: Concorde Fire Soccer Club

College career
Years	Team	Apps	(Gls)
2006–2009	Stanford Cardinal	87	(57)

Senior career*
Years	Team	Apps	(Gls)
2009	Pali Blues	6	(4)
2010	FC Gold Pride	18	(6)
2011	Boston Breakers	13	(4)
2013–2017	Sky Blue FC	75	(15)
2018–2020	Utah Royals	12	(1)
2021–2022	Washington Spirit	24	(1)
2023–2024	Gotham FC	16	(0)

International career^{‡}
2004	United States U-16		
2005	United States U-17		(10)
2006–2008	United States U-20	35	(24)
2007	United States U-21	1	(1)
2009	United States U-23	1	
2010–2023	United States	160	(3)
Medal record
Women's soccer
Representing the United States
Olympic Games
Gold medal – first place	2012 London	Team
Bronze medal – third place	2020 Tokyo	Team
FIFA Women's World Cup
Runner-up	2011 Germany
Winner	2015 Canada
Winner	2019 France
Pan American Games
Silver medal – second place	2007 Rio de Janeiro	Team
- * Club domestic league appearances and goals as of October 20, 2024 ‡ National team caps and goals as of August 6, 2023

Kelley Maureen O'Hara (born August 4, 1988) is an American former professional soccer player. She represented the United States national team on 160 occasions, winning two FIFA Women's World Cups and an Olympic gold medal. She spent most of her club career with National Women's Soccer League club NJ/NY Gotham FC. Known for her intensity, she played primarily as a wingback but played as a forward in college and occasionally played an attacking role in her professional career.

O'Hara was awarded the Hermann Trophy while playing for the Stanford Cardinal in 2009. She then played for FC Gold Pride and the Boston Breakers in Women's Professional Soccer. When the NWSL was formed in 2013, she joined Gotham FC (then known as Sky Blue FC). She later played for Utah Royals FC and the Washington Spirit, with whom she scored the winning goal in the NWSL Championship in 2021. She returned to Gotham and won her second NWSL Championship in 2023. She was named to the FIFA FIFPRO Women's World 11 in 2019.

O'Hara played internationally for the United States from 2010 to 2023. She appeared at four Women's World Cups in 2011; 2015, helping the team win the title; 2019, defending the title; and 2023. She appeared at three Olympic Games, including at the 2012 Olympics, where she was one of three U.S. players that played every minute of the tournament as they won gold; 2016; and 2020, where she won bronze.

O'Hara announced that she would retire from professional soccer at the end of the 2024 NWSL season. On September 21, 2024, she was put on the season-ending injury list due to chronic knee degeneration, thus effectively ending her career.

== Early life ==
O'Hara was born in Fayetteville, Georgia, near Atlanta to parents Dan and Karen O'Hara. She has a brother named Jerry and a sister named Erin. O'Hara has Irish heritage. O'Hara grew up in Peachtree City, Georgia and graduated from Starr's Mill High School in Fayette County where she played four years on the varsity soccer team and captained the team during her junior and senior years. O'Hara helped lead the Panthers to the 5A state title in 2006 with 20 goals and 16 assists. The team finished second in the state championships during her sophomore year. O'Hara was named Parade All-American as a junior and a senior and All-League, All-County and All-State all four years. In 2006, she was named the 2006 Atlanta Journal-Constitution (AJC) Player of the Year and Gatorade Georgia State Player of the Year. She was also named NSCAA All-American.

O'Hara played for club teams, the Peachtree City Lazers and AFC Lightning before playing for the U.S. U-16s in 2004 and then joining the U-17 youth women's national team of that same year. She played on the Concorde Fire South '88 Elite that went on to win the 2007 GA U19G State Cup and advance to the Semi Finals of Regionals.

=== Stanford Cardinal (2006–2009) ===
A two-time Parade All-American coming into her freshman year at Stanford University, O'Hara led the Cardinal in scoring in 2006 with nine goals. She repeated that feat during her sophomore year, helping the Cardinal to the third round of the NCAA Tournament.

During O'Hara's junior year, Stanford advanced to the College Cup for the first time since 1993, defeating 2005 national champion Portland, 1–0. The Cardinal would fall in the semi-final, 0–1, to Notre Dame.

As a senior, she had one of the best seasons in Division I history, scoring 26 goals with 13 assists. O'Hara's senior year ended in the 2009 College Cup, where the Cardinal lost to North Carolina. O'Hara received two yellow cards in the second half, ejecting her from the game, forcing the Cardinal to finish the game a woman down. The game ended with a score of 1–0, thus marking North Carolina's twentieth National Championship. She finished her college career at Stanford with 57 goals and 32 assists, both school records at the time.

O'Hara was awarded the 2009 Hermann Trophy as collegiate soccer's top player. She had been on the MAC Hermann Trophy watch list for three consecutive seasons. O'Hara was also a member of the Kappa Kappa Gamma sorority during her time at Stanford.

On August 5, 2025, O'Hara was named to the Stanford Athletics Hall of Fame Class of 2025.

== Club career ==
Prior to graduating from Stanford, O'Hara played for the Pali Blues of the USL W-League (semi-pro) in the summer of 2009, scoring four goals during her tenure with the club.

=== WPS: FC Gold Pride, Boston Breakers (2010–2011) ===
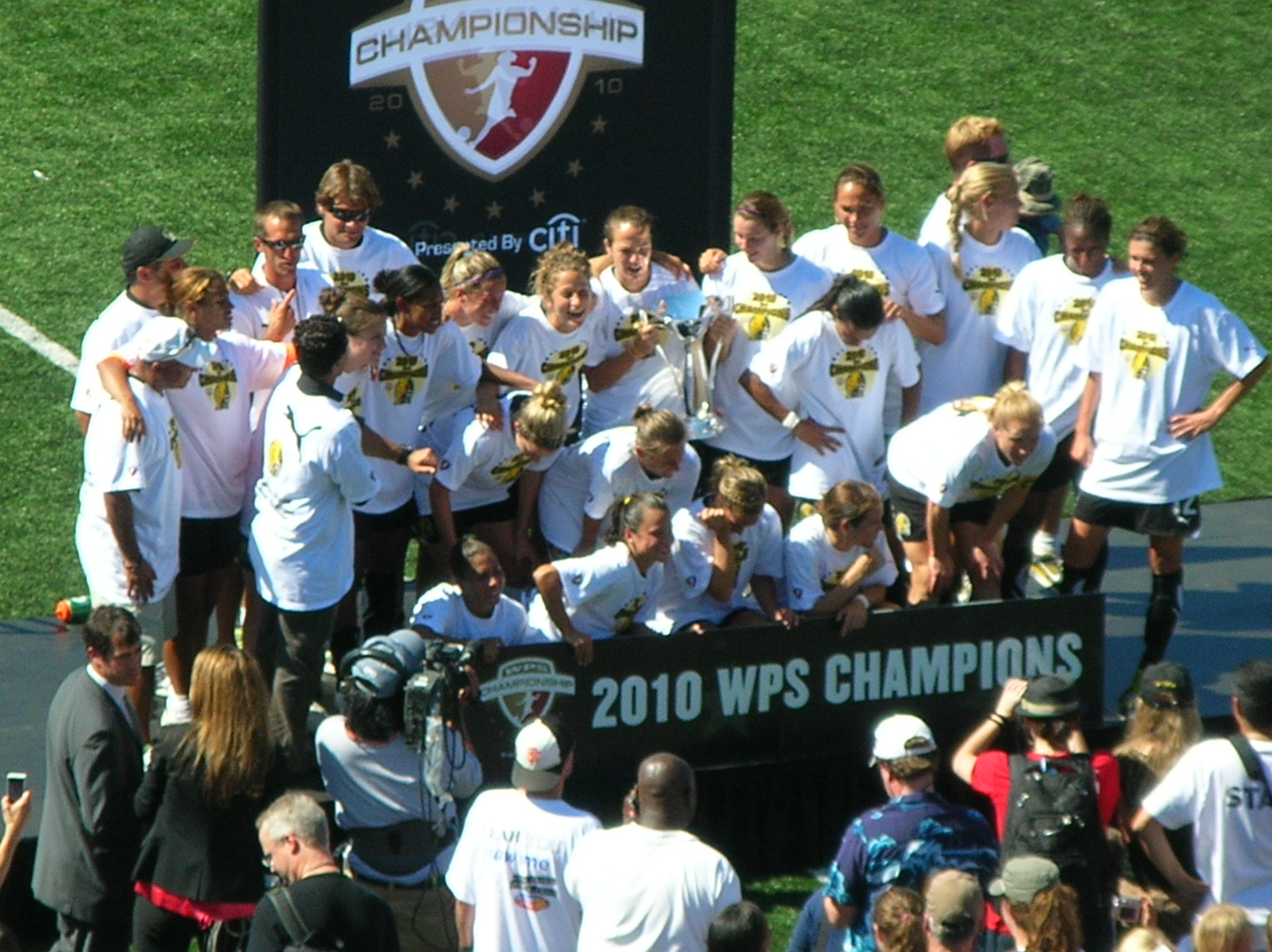
FC Gold Pride won the 2010 WPS Championship Trophy.

O'Hara was drafted third overall by FC Gold Pride at the 2010 WPS Draft. In addition to the close proximity of home stadium Pioneer Stadium to O'Hara's alma mater Stanford University, O'Hara had previously worked with FC Gold Pride head coach Albertin Montoya when he served as an assistant coach at Stanford University in 2008.

The team dominated the season finishing first during the regular season after defeating the Philadelphia Independence 4–1 with goals from O'Hara, Christine Sinclair and Marta. As the regular season champion, the team earned a direct route to the championship playoff game where they faced the Philadelphia Independence. During the final, FC Gold Pride defeated the Independence 4–0 to clinch the WPS Championship. Despite their successful season, the club ceased operations on November 16, 2010, due to not meeting the league's financial reserve requirement.

After FC Gold Pride folded in November 2010, O'Hara was signed by the Boston Breakers. She scored 10 goals during her two seasons in the WPS playing primarily as an outside midfielder. On January 5, 2012, it was announced O'Hara would be going back to her hometown because she had signed with the Atlanta Beat. However, the league folded just before the 2012 season began.

=== NWSL: Sky Blue FC, 2013–2017 ===
On January 11, 2013, O'Hara joined Sky Blue FC in the new National Women's Soccer League. Because the club's head coach, Jim Gabarra, played O'Hara as a forward, she reverted to a role she filled with success in college.

Over her career at Sky Blue, O'Hara has been played in several roles including forward, winger, right-back, and central midfielder.

=== Utah Royals FC, 2017–2020 ===
On December 29, 2017, O'Hara was traded to Utah Royals FC. Due to a hamstring injury, O'Hara only appeared in 8 games for Utah in 2018. O'Hara contributed to Utah's first-ever franchise win, scoring a goal in the team's 2–0 victory over the Washington Spirit in May 2018.

Utah finished the season in 5th place, just 2 points shy of making the playoffs. O'Hara underwent ankle surgery after the 2018 season.

In 2019, she made only 2 starts in 4 appearances for Utah due to injuries and World Cup duties. She was still recuperating from an off-season ankle injury at the start of the NWSL season and saw limited minutes as a substitute in two late-April games. Following her World Cup win, O'Hara started in two games for Utah at the end of July, notching an assist in the team's 2–2 draw against Portland. She was named to the 2019 NWSL second XI.

O'Hara played only 65 minutes for the Royals in the abbreviated 2020 NWSL season. She was still recovering from an injury at the start of the Challenge Cup and did not dress for the first few games. She saw limited minutes in Utah's July 13 game against Chicago and the July 18 game against Houston.

Starting in August 2020, rumors of a O'Hara trade to the Washington Spirit began to circulate and O'Hara announced in August that she would opt out of the 2020 NWSL Fall Series, set to begin in early September.

=== Washington Spirit, 2021–2022 ===
O'Hara's trade to the Spirit was officially announced on December 2, 2020. The deal sent $75,000 in allocation money to the Utah Royals and a 2022 first round draft pick. O'Hara stated that she requested the move to Spirit so that she could live, work in a same city with her partner. The Spirit won their first NWSL Championship on November 20, 2021, when they defeated the Chicago Red Stars, 2–1 in extra time at Lynn Family Stadium in Louisville, Kentucky. O'Hara scored the winning goal in the 97th minute of the game.

=== NJ/NY Gotham FC, 2023–2024 ===
After the 2022 season, O'Hara announced on November 15 that she would sign with NJ/NY Gotham FC, returning to the club she formerly played for when it was called Sky Blue. The move made her the first NWSL player to sign with a new team in free agency. Gotham FC officially announced her signing on January 25, 2023. O'Hara won her second NWSL championship with Gotham in 2023.

O'Hara announced on May 2, 2024, that she would retire from professional soccer at the end of the season. On September 21, 2024, O'Hara was put on the season-ending injury list due to chronic knee degeneration, thus effectively ending her career.

== International career ==
=== Youth national teams (2005–2010) ===
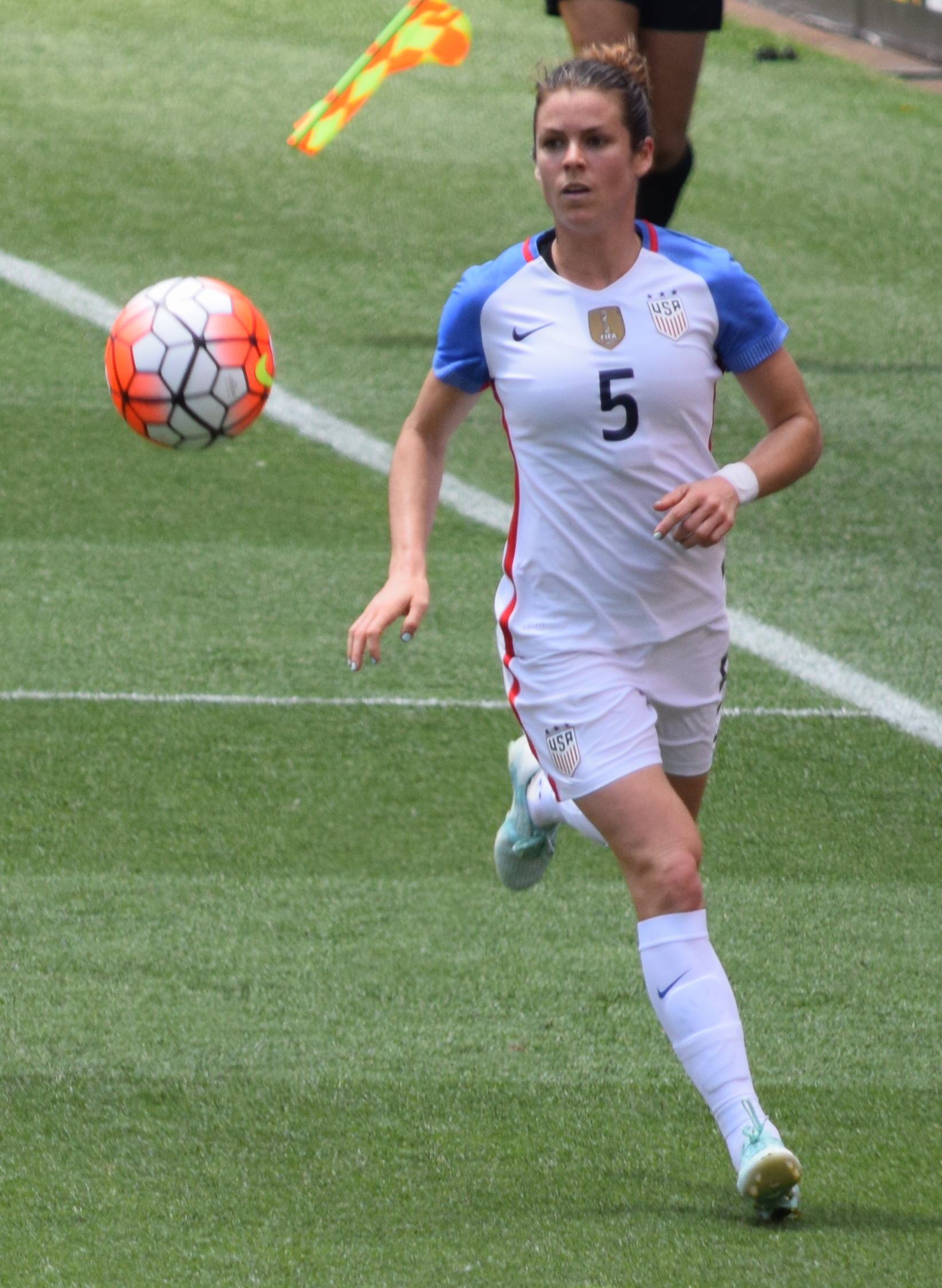
O'Hara playing for the USWNT in 2016

O'Hara represented the United States in various youth national teams from 2005 through 2010. She scored 24 goals in her 35 under-20 caps, the third-most ever for a U.S. player in the U-20 age group. She was a member of the fourth-place United States U-20 women's national soccer team that competed in the 2006 FIFA U-20 Women's World Championship in Russia. O'Hara scored two goals in the tournament: one against the Congo (for which game she was named FIFA's player of the match) and one against Germany. She was also the first player in the tournament to be ejected from a game, having picked up two yellow cards in the game against Argentina.

O'Hara rejoined the U-20 national team at the 2007 Pan American Games. She scored four goals in the women's football tournament, against Paraguay, Panama, and Mexico. The United States, which only sent their U-20 women to the tournament, would fall in the final game, 0–5, to a full-strength Brazilian senior team featuring Brazilian powerhouse, Marta.

In February 2008, O'Hara returned to the U-20 women's national team to play in the U-20 Four Nations Tournament in Chile. Her last appearance for the U-20 team occurred in July 2008, at the 2008 CONCACAF Women's U-20 Championship in Puebla, Mexico. O'Hara helped the U-20 team qualify for the 2008 FIFA U-20 Women's World Cup in Chile. She did not play in the U-20 World Cup, instead remaining with her college team in its NCAA postseason campaign.

=== Senior national team (2010–2023) ===
She was called into the senior national team's training camp in December 2009 and attended the January 2010 training camp in the lead-up to the 2010 Algarve Cup. O'Hara earned her first senior national team cap in March 2010, coming in as a substitute during a friendly match against Mexico.

=== 2011 FIFA Women's World Cup ===
After falling short of making the 21 player World Cup roster, O'Hara was called up to replace Lindsay Tarpley who tore her ACL in a send-off match against Japan on May 14, 2011. O'Hara earned just one cap at right midfield in the 2011 FIFA Women's World Cup in the final group stage game against Sweden. The United States went on to win the silver medal in that tournament.

=== 2012 Olympics ===
Throughout her national U-20s, collegiate, and club career, O'Hara was one of the top young offensive players in the United States, but under head coach Pia Sundhage, O'Hara was converted to play outside back in 2012 after teammate Ali Krieger went down with an ACL injury in the 2012 CONCACAF Women's Olympic Qualifying Tournament. Against Guatemala on January 22, 2012, in the Olympic Qualifiers, she made her first start at left back and registered three assists. O'Hara started at right back against Costa Rica in the match that qualified the United States for the 2012 Summer Olympics in London. O'Hara played in every minute of the United States' gold medal run, one of three American players to do so.

=== 2015 FIFA Women's World Cup ===
In the United States' first four games of the 2015 FIFA Women's World Cup, O'Hara did not see any playing time. O'Hara made her first start of the tournament in the quarter-final game against China PR. She was replaced by Christen Press in the 61st minute. O'Hara scored her first career international goal in the United States' 2–0 victory over Germany in the semi-final. In the final against Japan, O'Hara entered the game in the 61st minute to replace Megan Rapinoe. The United States went on to defeat Japan 5–2, winning the first World Cup title since 1999 and the third overall World Cup title for the United States since the inaugural Women's World Cup in 1991.

=== 2016 Olympics ===
During their 2016 appearance at the Olympics, the United States soccer team gained their worst-ever tournament finish. O'Hara played in the first game, which resulted in a 2-0 defeat of New Zealand. Against France, the United States won 1-0. The final game of the play-in round was against Colombia, which resulted in a 2-2 tie, in which O'Hara received a foul. Once they progressed to the quarter-finals, the United States' played their final game of the Olympics against Sweden, losing to the team on penalties. During this final contest, O'Hara posted 2 shots.

=== 2019 FIFA Women's World Cup ===
Despite injuries which kept her from playing regularly for the United States in the year leading up to the World Cup, O'Hara was named to Jill Ellis' roster for the 2019 FIFA World Cup in France. She played in five of the United States' seven games and appeared in all knockout stage games. In the team's opening game against Thailand, O'Hara crossed the ball to Alex Morgan in the 12th minute who converted O'Hara's service to notch the team's first goal of the tournament. The U.S. went on to beat Thailand 13–0. O'Hara made her second assist of the tournament in the semifinal against England when she delivered a cross from the right flank to Christen Press whose 10th minute goal put the U.S. in the lead. O'Hara started in the final against the Netherlands but was substituted at halftime due to a collision just before the break with the Dutch winger Lieke Martens. The U.S. won the match 2–0 and O'Hara won her second World Cup.

=== 2020 Olympics ===
Due to COVID-19, the 2020 Olympics were postponed until the following summer. During the first game of Olympics, the United States lost against Sweden 3-0. After this loss, O'Hara noted that the team needed to be "ruthless" in their next game against New Zealand, which they won 6-1. Against Australia, the United States ended the game in a draw of 0-0.

The United States progressed to the quarter-final games, which they played against the Netherlands. O'Hara played the full game, pushing up the flanks in the final third. The game ended 2-2, with the United States winning 4-2 on penalties.

During the semi-final game, the United States faced off against Canada. O'Hara started the game, receiving a yellow card 30 minutes in after making a late challenge against Nichelle Prince. Canada scored after receiving a penalty. O'Hara was replaced by Sam Mewis at 80 minutes. The United States were unable to mount a comeback and lost to Canada for the first time in 20 years.

=== 2023 FIFA Women's World Cup ===
On June 21, 2023, Vlatko Andonovski named O'Hara to the United States squad for the 2023 FIFA Women's World Cup in Australia, her fourth World Cup tournament. She made her tournament debut in the 84th minute of the group-stage opener against Vietnam. While she did not feature in the next two games against the Netherlands and Portugal, she made her next appearance during the game against Sweden, coming on in the last minute of extra time before the penalty shootout. O'Hara was the third U.S. player to miss her penalty shot, and Sweden advanced on penalties, eliminating the U.S. from the World Cup in the Round of 16.

== Endorsements ==
O'Hara has appeared in multiple commercials and advertisements for Under Armour. In 2015, she appeared in television commercials and promotional materials promoting chocolate milk on behalf of the National Fluid Milk Processor Promotion Board.

== Podcast ==
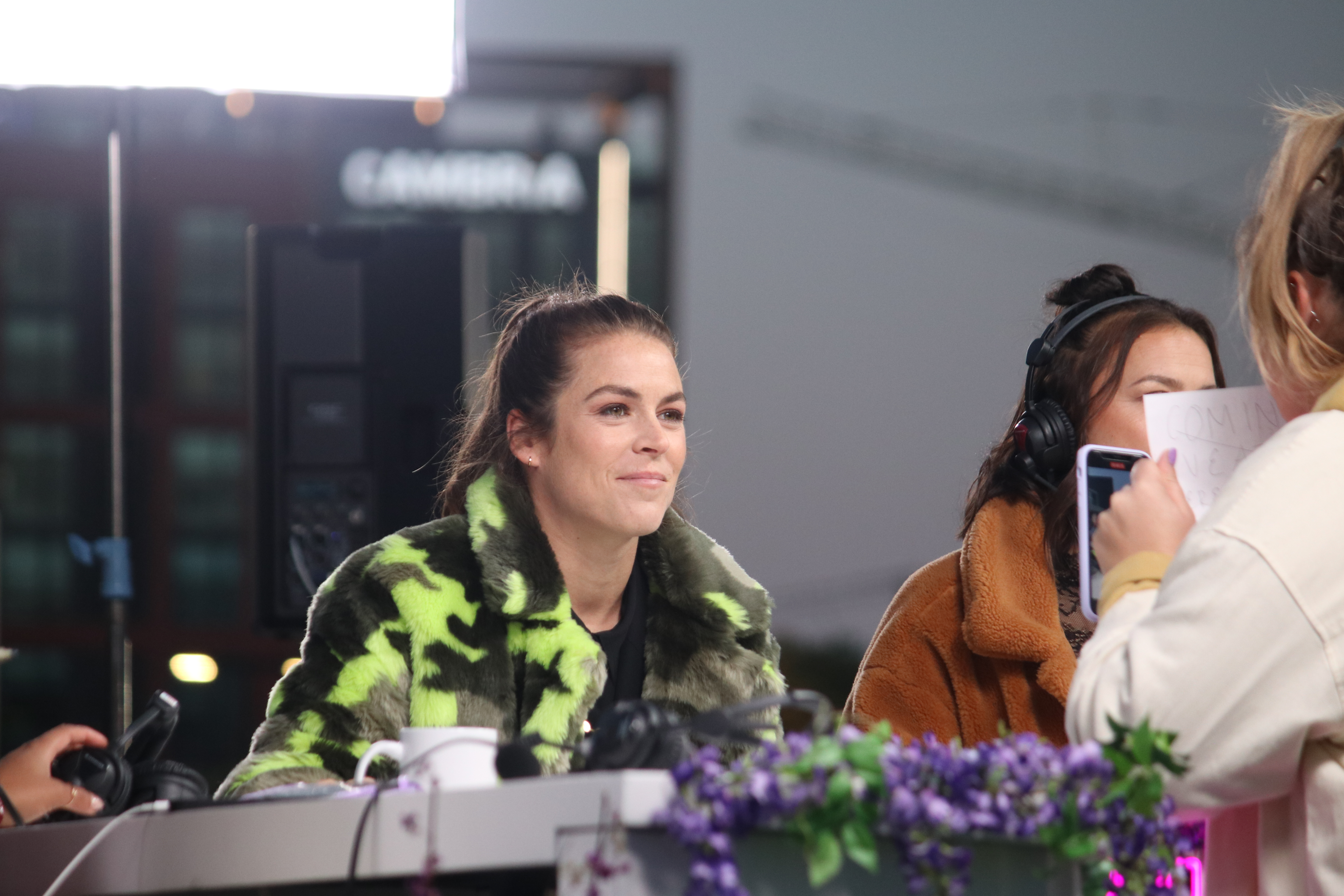
O'Hara at the Just Women's Sports pregame show before the 2022 NWSL Championship.

In July 2020, O'Hara launched a podcast with sports website Just Women's Sports. The podcast was rebranded as The Players' Pod in April 2022. Website founder Haley Rosen had asked O'Hara to join the advisory board. O'Hara said that she instead asked to host their podcast because she'd "always thought hosting a podcast would be fun." O'Hara says her goal is to generate "open, candid conversations" about the lives of athletes, particularly female athletes. The podcast posted its last episode on August 9, 2023.

== Film ==
On April 23, 2024, O'Hara announced that she was one of the executive producers of "Ripe!," a queer short film in which two young women develop feelings for each other after a competitive moment in a pickup soccer game. "Ripe!," which celebrates the ripening of LGBTQIA+ identities and shedding queer shame, premiered at the 2024 Tribeca Film Festival on June 9, 2024. The film won Best Narrative Short at the festival.

== Personal life ==
O'Hara was one of many out LGBT athletes to compete in the 2019 FIFA Women's World Cup in France. As of 2019, during her off-season, she resides with her partner, Kameryn Stanhouse, in Washington, D.C. She got engaged to Stanhouse on New Year's Eve 2022, announcing it to fans via Instagram.

== Career statistics ==
=== Club ===
As of October 20, 2024

Appearances and goals by club, season and competition
Club	Season	League			Cup (Note: Includes the NWSL Challenge Cup)		Playoffs (Note: Includes W-League Playoffs, WPS Playoffs, NWSL Playoffs)		Other		Total		Ref.
Club	Season	Division	Apps	Goals	Apps	Goals	Apps	Goals	Apps	Goals	Apps	Goals	Ref.
Pali Blues	2009	USL W-League	5	3	—		1	1	—		6	4	
FC Gold Pride	2010	WPS	18	6	—		1	0	—		19	6	
Boston Breakers	2011	WPS	12	4	—		1	0	—		13	4	
Sky Blue FC	2013	NWSL	12	0	—		0	0	—		12	0	
Sky Blue FC	2014	NWSL	22	7	—		—		—		22	7	
Sky Blue FC	2015	NWSL	11	3	—		—		—		11	3	
Sky Blue FC	2016	NWSL	12	1	—		—		—		12	1	
Sky Blue FC	2017	NWSL	18	4	—		—		—		18	4	
Utah Royals FC	2018	NWSL	8	1	—		—		—		8	1	
Utah Royals FC	2019	NWSL	4	0	—		—		—		4	0	
Utah Royals FC	2020	NWSL	— (Note: 2020 regular season and playoffs cancelled due COVID-19 pandemic)		2	0	—		0 (Note: Includes the NWSL Fall Series)	0	2	0	
Washington Spirit	2021	NWSL	14	0	1	0	3	1	—		18	1	
Washington Spirit	2022	NWSL	7	0	8	0	—		—		15	0	
NJ/NY Gotham FC	2023	NWSL	13	0	1	0	2	0	—		16	0	
NJ/NY Gotham FC	2024	NWSL	3	0	1	0	—		—		4	0	
Career total			159	29	12	0	8	2	0	0	180	31	—

=== International ===
As of match played August 6, 2023

Appearances and goals by national team and year
National team	Year	Apps	Goals
United States	2010	3	0
United States	2011	4	0
United States	2012	26	0
United States	2013	7	0
United States	2014	12	0
United States	2015	17	1
United States	2016	22	1
United States	2017	13	0
United States	2018	8	0
United States	2019	13	0
United States	2020	7	0
United States	2021	16	0
United States	2022	8	1
United States	2023	4	0
Total		160	3

Scores and results list United States's goal tally first, score column indicates score after each O'Hara goal.

List of international goals scored by Kelley O'Hara
No.	Date	Venue	Opponent	Score	Result	Competition	Ref.
1	June 30, 2015	Olympic Stadium, Montreal	Germany	2–0	2–0	2015 FIFA Women's World Cup	
2	February 15, 2016	Toyota Stadium, Frisco, Texas	Puerto Rico	4–0	10–0	2016 CONCACAF Women's Olympic Qualifying	
3	June 28, 2022	Rio Tinto Stadium, Sandy, Utah	Colombia	2–0	2–0	Friendly	

== Honors ==
FC Gold Pride

- WPS Championship: 2010

Washington Spirit

- NWSL Championship: 2021

NJ/NY Gotham FC

- NWSL Championship: 2023

United States U20

- CONCACAF Women's U-20 Championship runner-up: 2008

United States

- FIFA Women's World Cup: 2015, 2019, runner-up: 2011
- Olympic Gold Medal: 2012
- Olympic Bronze Medal: 2020
- CONCACAF Women's Championship: 2014; 2018; 2022
- CONCACAF Women's Olympic Qualifying Tournament: 2012; 2016; 2020
- SheBelieves Cup: 2016; 2018; 2020, 2021; 2022
- Algarve Cup: 2011, 2013, 2015
- Four Nations Tournament: 2011

Individual

- Pac-10 Conference First-Team: 2006, 2007, 2009
- U.S. Soccer Young Female Athlete of the Year Finalist: 2007, 2009
- Hermann Trophy Winner: 2009
- NCAA All-American First-Team: 2009
- ESPN Academic All-America First-Team: 2009
- Georgia Sports Hall of Fame: Inducted February 22, 2020. O'Hara was the youngest person ever inducted and first soccer player to be inducted.
- IFFHS CONCACAF Woman Team of the Decade 2011–2020
- FIFPro Women's World XI: 2019
- Stanford Athletics Hall of Fame: Class of 2025

== See also ==
- List of Olympic medalists in football
- List of Stanford University people
- CONCACAF Women's U-20 Championship
- Soccer America Player of the Year Award
- Honda Sports Award
