= Trout Lake (Saskatchewan) =

Lake in Saskatchewan, Canada

- Location in Saskatchewan Trout Lake (Canada)
- Location: Northern Administration District, Saskatchewan
- Coordinates: 55.6046°N 105.3068°W
- Part of: Churchill River drainage basin
- Primary inflows: Churchill River
- River sources: Canadian Shield
- Primary outflows: Churchill River
- Basin countries: Canada
- Surface area: 3,536 ha (8,740 acres)
- Max. depth: 42.7 m (140 ft)
- Shore length^{1}: 197 km (122 mi)
- Settlements: None
- ^{1} Shore length is not a well-defined measure.

Trout Lake is a lake in Northern Saskatchewan, Canada. It is along the course of the Churchill River about 56 kilometres (35 mi) north of La Ronge. The Churchill River, which is largely a series of interconnected lakes, flows east into the Hudson Bay. Upstream along the Churchill is Black Bear Island Lake and downstream are Crew and Stack Lakes.

There is no highway access and there are no communities on Trout Lake. Boreal Camps operates a fly-in only fishing lodge at the lake.

== Description ==
Trout lake is a large, irregularly shaped lake with many bays and small islands that covers an area of 3,536 hectares (8,740 acres). Its shoreline measures 197 kilometres (122 mi) and it has a maximum depth of 42.7 metres (140 ft).

The Churchill River flows in from Black Bear Island Lake at the Trout Lake's south-western corner. It exits at two different points around Wanahichewun Island on the northern and eastern sides of the lake. At the lake's eastern shore, the main branch of the river flows out along the southern side of Wanahichewun Island and into Crew Lake. At the northern end of Trout Lake, the other branch of the Churchill River flows out over rapids and into Stack Lake. The two branches reconvene at the eastern end of Wanahichewun Island in Nipew Lake. Trout Portage is a portage on Wanahichewun Island that bypasses the rapids connecting Trout and Stack Lakes. Also near Trout Lake's northern end is a short river that flows in from neighbouring McIntosh Lake.

== Fish species ==
Fish commonly found in Trout Lake include yellow perch, walleye, lake trout, northern pike, cisco, longnose sucker, white sucker, burbot, and lake whitefish.

== See also ==
- List of lakes of Saskatchewan
