= Peachtree City, Georgia =

- City
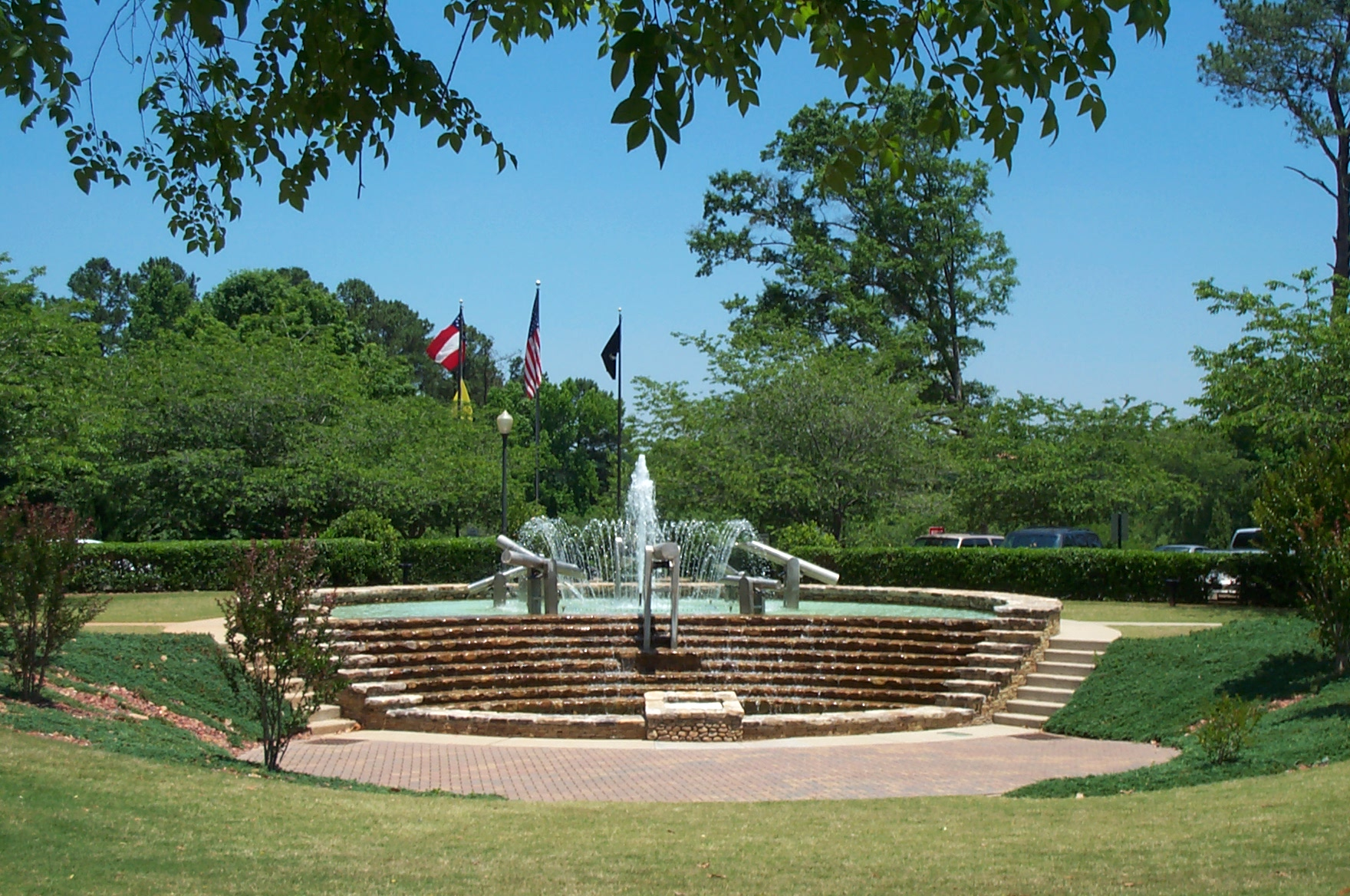
- City Hall Fountain

- Flag Logo
- Motto: "Plan to Stay"
- Interactive map of Peachtree City, Georgia
- Country: United States
- State: Georgia
- County: Fayette
- Settled: 1959; 67 years ago
- Incorporated: 1962; 64 years ago

Government
  - Mayor: Kim Learnard

Area
  - Total: 26.04 sq mi (67.44 km^{2})
  - Land: 25.14 sq mi (65.10 km^{2})
  - Water: 0.90 sq mi (2.34 km^{2})
- Elevation: 899 ft (274 m)

Population (2020)
  - Total: 38,244
  - Density: 1,522/sq mi (587.5/km^{2})
- Time zone: UTC-5 (Eastern (EST))
  - Summer (DST): UTC-4 (EDT)
- ZIP code: 30269
- Area codes: 678, 770, 404
- FIPS code: 13-59724
- GNIS feature ID: 0320310
- Website: peachtree-city.org

Peachtree City is the largest city in Fayette County, Georgia, United States. As of the 2020 census, it had a population of 38,244. Peachtree City is located in southern Metro Atlanta. The city has the most extensive golf cart path network in the world with over 100 miles (160 km) of golf cart paths.

== History ==
The area was first settled by Woodland Era indigenous people. In the 1950s, real estate developers purchased over 12,000 acres in Fayette County to build a planned community. Peachtree City was chartered March 9, 1959. In 1957, Flat Creek was dammed to create Lake Peachtree.

Lake Kedron in Peachtree City, Georgia.

In 1974, after the city petitioned the Georgia General Assembly to amend existing laws regarding motorized cart use on city streets, Governor Jimmy Carter signed legislation exempting carts from inspection, motor vehicle registration and certain other equipment requirements for motor cars. This legislation paved the way for the legal use of golf carts in Peachtree City. Since then, the city’s network of multi-use paths has steadily expanded, now encompassing over 100 miles (160 km) and serving as a key feature of local transportation.

In 2001, the city was designated a "Tree City USA" by the Arbor Day Foundation. In 2013, the 650-acre (2.6 km^{2}) Lake McIntosh opened for public use.

== Geography ==
Peachtree City is located in western Fayette County in the southern Atlanta metro area. It is bordered to the west by Coweta County and to the north by the Town of Tyrone. It is crossed by Georgia State Route 74 and Georgia State Route 54. SR 74, the Joel Cowan Parkway, runs through the west side of Peachtree City.

According to the U.S. Census Bureau, Peachtree City has a total area of 25.4 square miles (65.9 km^{2}), of which 24.6 square miles (63.6 km^{2}) is land and 0.93 square miles (2.4 km^{2}), or 3.57%, is water. The city is in the watershed of Line Creek, which forms the western city boundary and county line, and is a south-flowing tributary of the Flint River.

Lake Peachtree

Peachtree City has three lakes. Lake Kedron to the north is a reservoir that supplies Lake Peachtree to the south via Flat Creek. Lake Kedron is owned by the Fayette County Authority, and is managed so as to keep Lake Peachtree full whenever there is a lack of rain and still allow for recreational use of the lake during droughts. Lake Kedron is not afforded any recreational use except for fishing. Lake McIntosh, the newest lake, close to Planterra, has now reached full pool.

The city is subdivided into five neighborhoods called "villages": Aberdeen, Braelinn, Glenloch, Kedron, and Wilksmoor.

=== Climate ===
Climate data for Peachtree City, Georgia
Month	Jan	Feb	Mar	Apr	May	Jun	Jul	Aug	Sep	Oct	Nov	Dec	Year
Record high °F (°C)	80 (27)	82 (28)	87 (31)	92 (33)	97 (36)	101 (38)	104 (40)	102 (39)	99 (37)	97 (36)	88 (31)	79 (26)	104 (40)
Mean daily maximum °F (°C)	55 (13)	59 (15)	67 (19)	75 (24)	81 (27)	88 (31)	90 (32)	89 (32)	84 (29)	75 (24)	66 (19)	57 (14)	74 (23)
Mean daily minimum °F (°C)	30 (−1)	33 (1)	39 (4)	46 (8)	55 (13)	64 (18)	68 (20)	67 (19)	60 (16)	49 (9)	40 (4)	32 (0)	49 (9)
Record low °F (°C)	−8 (−22)	4 (−16)	11 (−12)	24 (−4)	35 (2)	41 (5)	50 (10)	51 (11)	32 (0)	25 (−4)	4 (−16)	−2 (−19)	−8 (−22)
Average precipitation inches (mm)	4.58 (116)	5.07 (129)	5.09 (129)	3.83 (97)	3.92 (100)	3.80 (97)	4.95 (126)	4.46 (113)	3.76 (96)	3.25 (83)	4.15 (105)	4.21 (107)	51.07 (1,298)

== Demographics ==
Historical population
Census	Pop.	Note	%±
1970	793		—
1980	6,429		710.7%
1990	19,027		196.0%
2000	31,580		66.0%
2010	34,364		8.8%
2020	38,244		11.3%
2025 (est.)	40,880	▲	6.9%
U.S. Decennial Census; 2025

=== 2020 census ===
As of the 2020 census, Peachtree City had a population of 38,244. The median age was 44.2 years. 23.9% of residents were under the age of 18 and 20.1% of residents were 65 years of age or older. For every 100 females there were 91.7 males, and for every 100 females age 18 and over there were 87.7 males age 18 and over.

99.6% of residents lived in urban areas, while 0.4% lived in rural areas.

There were 14,521 households in Peachtree City, of which 34.7% had children under the age of 18 living in them. Of all households, 61.2% were married-couple households, 12.1% were households with a male householder and no spouse or partner present, and 24.1% were households with a female householder and no spouse or partner present. About 23.2% of all households were made up of individuals and 12.5% had someone living alone who was 65 years of age or older.

There were 15,212 housing units, of which 4.5% were vacant. The homeowner vacancy rate was 1.2% and the rental vacancy rate was 7.3%.

Racial composition as of the 2020 census
Race	Number	Percent
White	27,320	71.4%
Black or African American	3,250	8.5%
American Indian and Alaska Native	95	0.2%
Asian	3,432	9.0%
Native Hawaiian and Other Pacific Islander	19	0.0%
Some other race	1,010	2.6%
Two or more races	3,118	8.2%
Hispanic or Latino (of any race)	3,001	7.8%

== Economy ==
- Cooper Lighting Solutions — formerly Eaton Corp Lighting Division and Cooper Industries — is headquartered in Peachtree City. It was acquired by Signify N.V. on March 2, 2020.
- Hoshizaki America, Inc. has its corporate headquarters and a warehousing and manufacturing facility in Peachtree City and employs over 700 people in the U.S. It is a major supplier of ice machines, refrigerated display cases, dispensers, prep tables, commercial refrigerators, and freezers for foodservice, hotels, restaurants, hospitals, nursing homes, schools, and convenience stores.
- Panasonic Automotive Systems Company of America (PASA), based in Peachtree City, is the largest employer in the city. It supplies automotive audio, video, and navigation systems for Honda (including Acura), Ford (Sync 3), Nissan, General Motors, Toyota, and Subaru.
- The National Weather Service maintains an office in Peachtree City, serving most of northern Georgia. It is the only NWS office in the state.
- Gallopade International, Inc. has its corporate headquarters, printing, and warehousing facility in Peachtree City. The company publishes over 15,000 educational products for children and adults, including the Carole Marsh series and complete school curricula.
- Rinnai Corporation, manufacturer of the leading brand of tankless water heaters, has a two-story headquarters in Peachtree City and launched a North America Innovation and Training Center.
- Gerresheimer, a medical company based in Düsseldorf, established its Peachtree City manufacturing facility in 1993. The company invested $88 million in 2023 to build a new 160,000-square-foot (15,000 m^{2}) factory focused on autoinjector production, expected to open in fall 2024. Currently, Gerresheimer employs 270 people, with plans to add over 400 jobs following the expansion.
- Sany America, a Chinese multinational heavy machinery manufacturer, operates a 272-acre (1.10 km^{2}) facility in Peachtree City, Georgia, employing over 130 people. The company produces concrete pumper trucks and large crawler cranes.
- TDK Components U.S.A., Inc. is an electronics manufacturer in Peachtree City specializing in multilayer ceramic capacitors for automotive and consumer electronics industries, employing approximately 130 people.

== Sports ==
=== Soccer ===
The Peachtree City MOBA of the Premier Development League was founded in 2013. The club played out of MOBA Soccer Stadium at MOBA Soccer Academy.

The Peachtree City Lazers soccer club is the city’s local recreational team and was founded in 1977. Former Lazers player Kelley O'Hara went on to play for Stars Mill, Stanford, The Olympics, and in three World Cups.

== Government ==
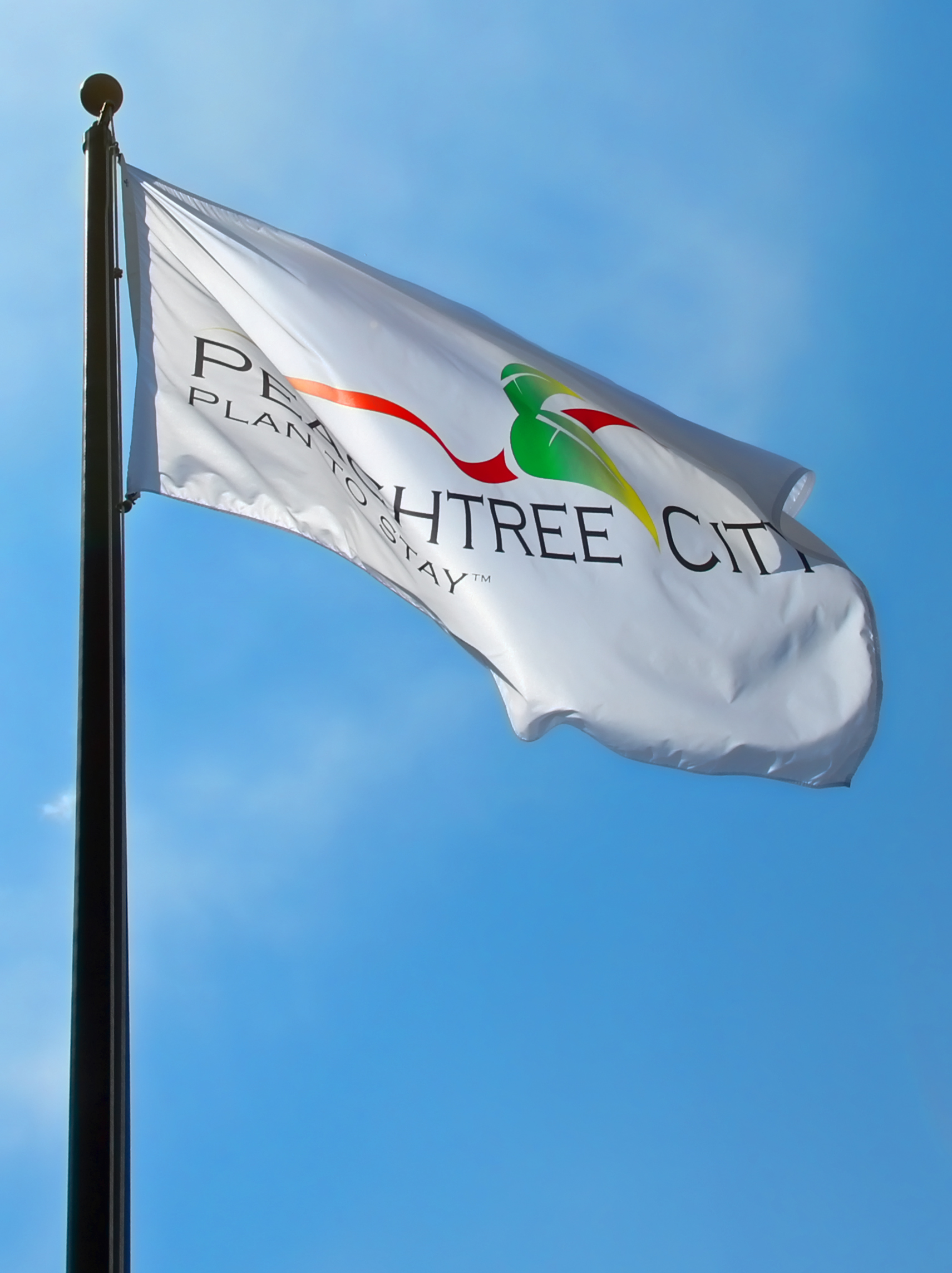
The official flag of Peachtree City

As of 2022, the mayor of Peachtree City is Kim Learnard. City Council members include Laura Johnson, Suzanne Brown, and Clint Holland.

== Education ==
=== Universities ===
Universities in the city are:

- Clayton State University – This facility is at the north end of Peachtree Pkwy in Peachtree City. It offers dual-credit enrollment program for high school students. Fayette has an instructional site with undergraduate degrees in business, psychology, integrative studies, administrative management, and technology management, and an MBA program with a concentration in logistics and supply chain management.
- Point University (formerly Atlanta Christian College) – This campus offers the Access program for adult learners and the dual-credit enrollment program for high school students.

=== Public schools ===
Peachtree City is served by the Fayette County School System. Schools located in Peachtree City include:

- McIntosh High School
- J.C. Booth Middle School
- Braelinn Elementary School
- Huddleston Elementary School
- Kedron Elementary School
- Oak Grove Elementary School
- Peachtree City Elementary School
- Crabapple Lane Elementary School

=== Private schools ===
Private schools in Peachtree City include Landmark Christian School (grades K–12) and St. Paul’s Lutheran Church School.

Additionally, The Campus serves grades 6–12 with small class sizes and personalized academic programs. Foundry Academy, also for grades 6–12, is a college-preparatory school offering a balanced curriculum in humanities, arts, and STEM with a low student-to-teacher ratio.

== Media ==
=== Film and television ===
Lifetime's Drop Dead Diva was filmed in Peachtree City and surrounding areas of Fayette and Coweta County. With Raleigh Studios in nearby Senoia, Peachtree City has often been the backdrop for episodes of other series, such as The Walking Dead. Scenes from the film Joyful Noise were shot there as well.

The 2019 film Greener Grass was filmed here and the city's unique transport life features heavily. The film's setting is a fantastical location and not the real Peachtree City.

For the production of Megalopolis, Francis Ford Coppola purchased a drive-in Days Inn motel located in Peachtree City for $4.35 million to reside in and accommodate the crew and his extended family. The building was later opened to the public on July 5, 2024, as the All-Movie Hotel. Memorabilia from Coppola's previous films is displayed throughout the hotel.

== Infrastructure ==
=== Transportation ===
==== Golf carts ====
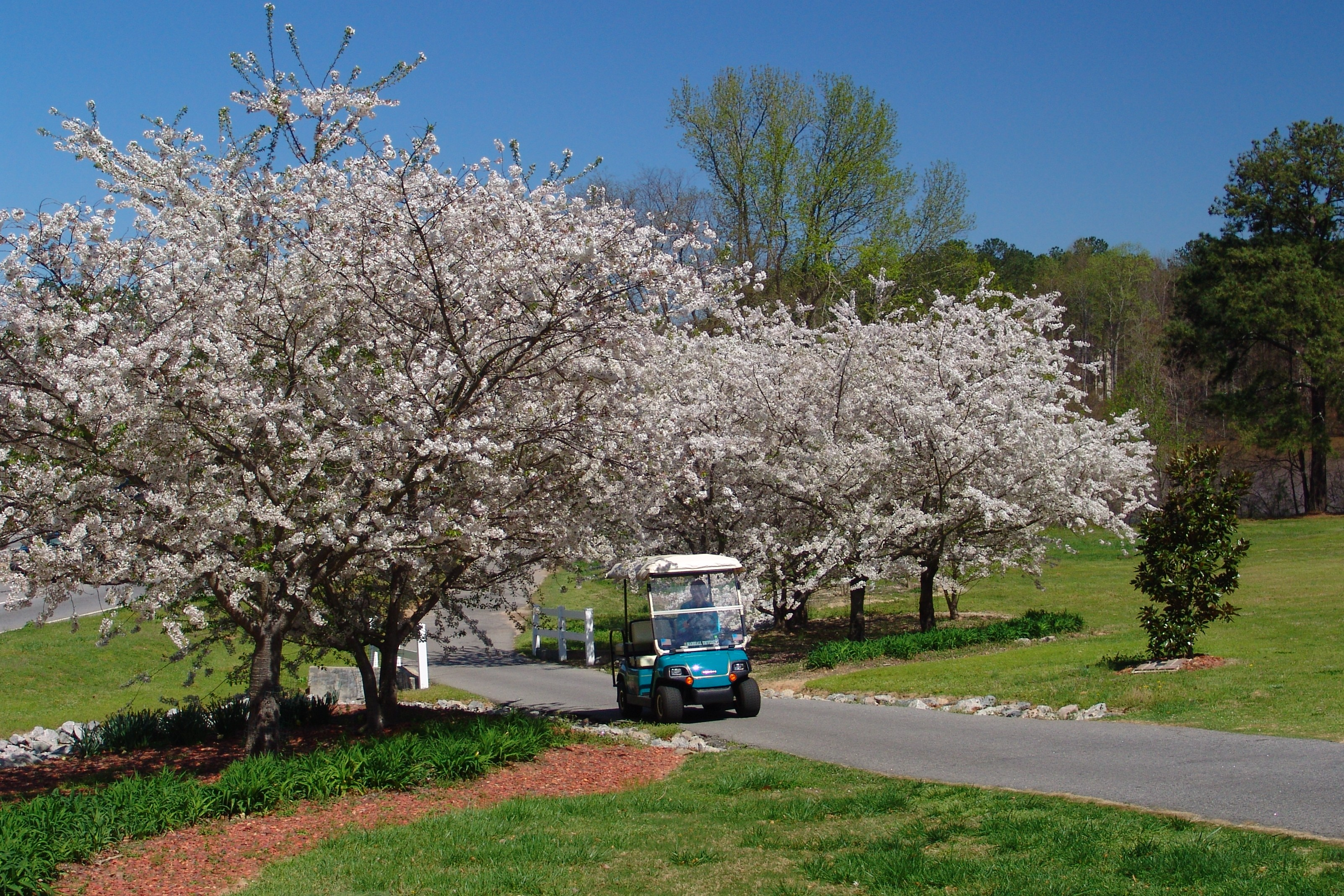
A golf cart in Peachtree City

Peachtree City has a system of golf cart paths which spider across the town and provide a secondary means of access to almost any destination within city limits. These multi-use paths stretch for more than 100 miles (160 km) throughout the city. Many places of business have specially designated golf cart parking spaces. The Peachtree City Police Department has several golf carts used to patrol along these paths.

Over 10,000 households own a golf cart, and use them as an extra vehicle for local transportation. Children aged twelve to fifteen may operate a cart on Peachtree City cart paths with a parent, grandparent or other guardian in the front seat. Those who are fifteen or older, with either a valid Georgia learner's permit or a full driver's license, are allowed to operate golf carts alone.

Students at McIntosh High School are encouraged to drive family golf carts to school because of limited car parking. In 2015, Starr's Mill High School opened a golf-cart specific lot. The golf cart paths are also used by cyclists, joggers, and pedestrians as a safer alternative to the side of the road. In February 2003, Golf Digest magazine discussed the traffic congestion caused by the use of golf carts in the city.

==== Airports ====
Atlanta Regional Airport, also known as Falcon Field, is a general aviation airport that provides chartered air service. Since 1987, it has grown from having about 60 aircraft based at the airport to about 165. The runway is 5,220 feet (1,590 m) long and holds up to 60,000 pounds (27,000 kg) of aircraft. It mainly serves Peachtree City's business residents, but also serves as a place of entertainment for people interested. There is a viewing area provided for the public to watch aircraft take-off and land. The airport hosts many events throughout the year, including the Great Georgia Air Show during October. The airport is the location of a National Weather Service radar station, Southeast River Forecast Center, and Weather Forecast Office, which serves 96 counties in northern and central Georgia.

Hartsfield-Jackson Atlanta International Airport provides commercial service and is located 25 miles (40 km) northeast of Peachtree City via Georgia State Route 74 and Interstate 85.

Peachtree City was designated a foreign-trade zone by the U.S. Customs Service. In the U.S., a foreign-trade zone is a site in or near a U.S. Customs port of entry (in this case Hartsfield–Jackson Atlanta International Airport), designated free of customs entry procedures.

== Notable people ==
- Danny Care, soccer player
- Stela Cole, singer-songwriter
- Johnny Grunge, professional wrestler
- Brian Jack, U.S. representative
- Sherrilyn Kenyon, #1 New York Times bestselling author
- Mary T. Meagher, Olympian and swimmer
- Kelley O'Hara, USWNT player
- Reed Sorenson, NASCAR driver
- Travis Van Winkle, actor
- Rutledge Wood, TV host

== See also ==
- Neighborhood electric vehicle
