= Lake Kedron =

Reservoir in Georgia, US

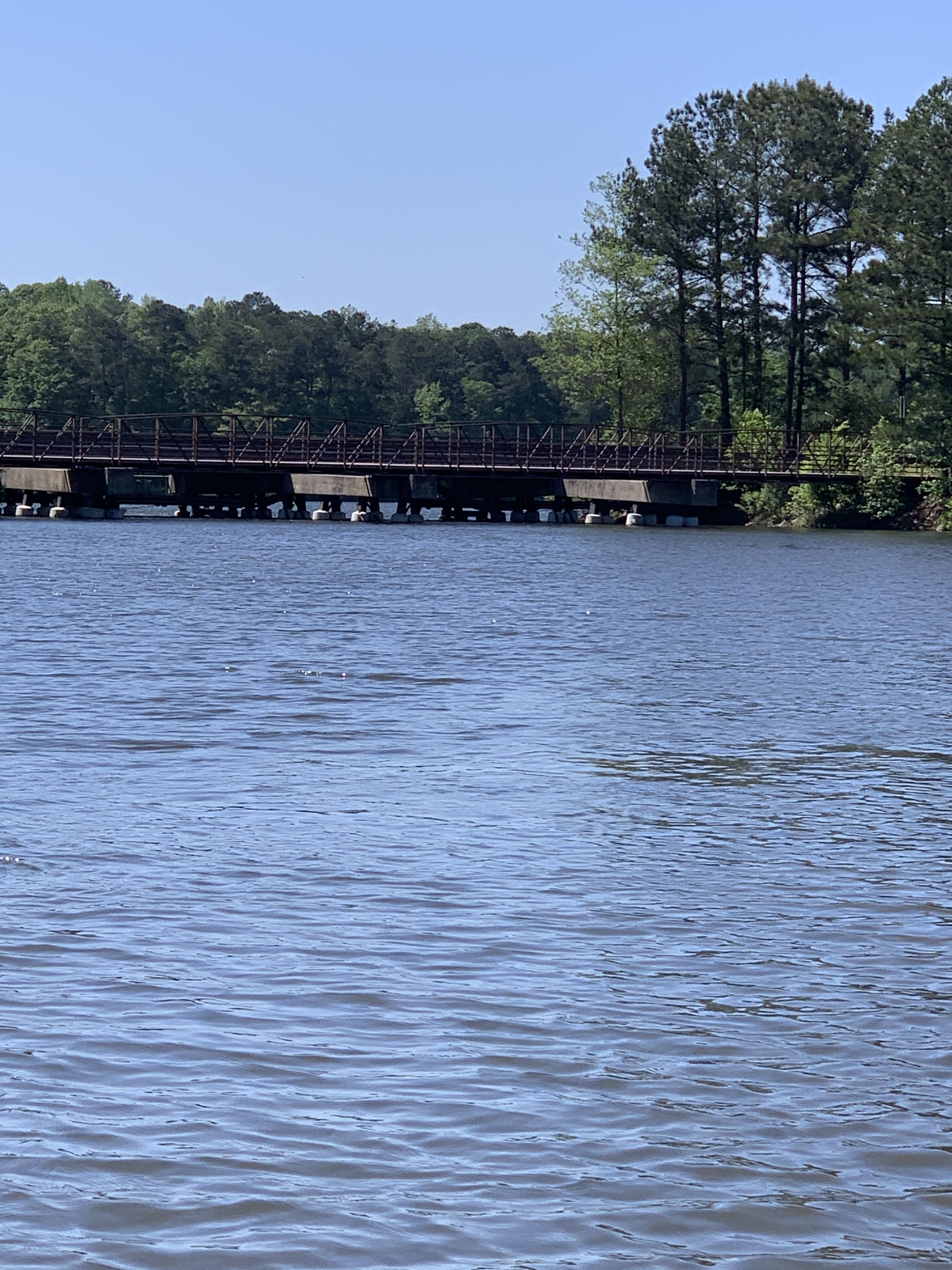
- Peachtree Parkway and golf cart bridge over Lake Kedron

- Location within Georgia
- Location: Fayette County, Georgia
- Coordinates: 33°25′44″N 84°34′52″W
- Type: reservoir
- Basin countries: United States
- Surface area: 235-acre (95 ha)
- Surface elevation: 830 ft (253 m)

Lake Kedron is a 235-acre (95 ha) reservoir in Peachtree City, Georgia. It holds about 1 billion gallons of water. It is located on the north side of the city, within the village of Kedron. Recreational fishing is allowed with a license, but swimming is prohibited. Lake Kedron is a manmade lake formed by a portion of Flat Creek along with other smaller channels of water flowing into it. At its dam, Lake Kedron drains into Flat Creek, which continues through the heart of Peachtree City by feeding Lake Peachtree and then merging with Line Creek southwest of the town.

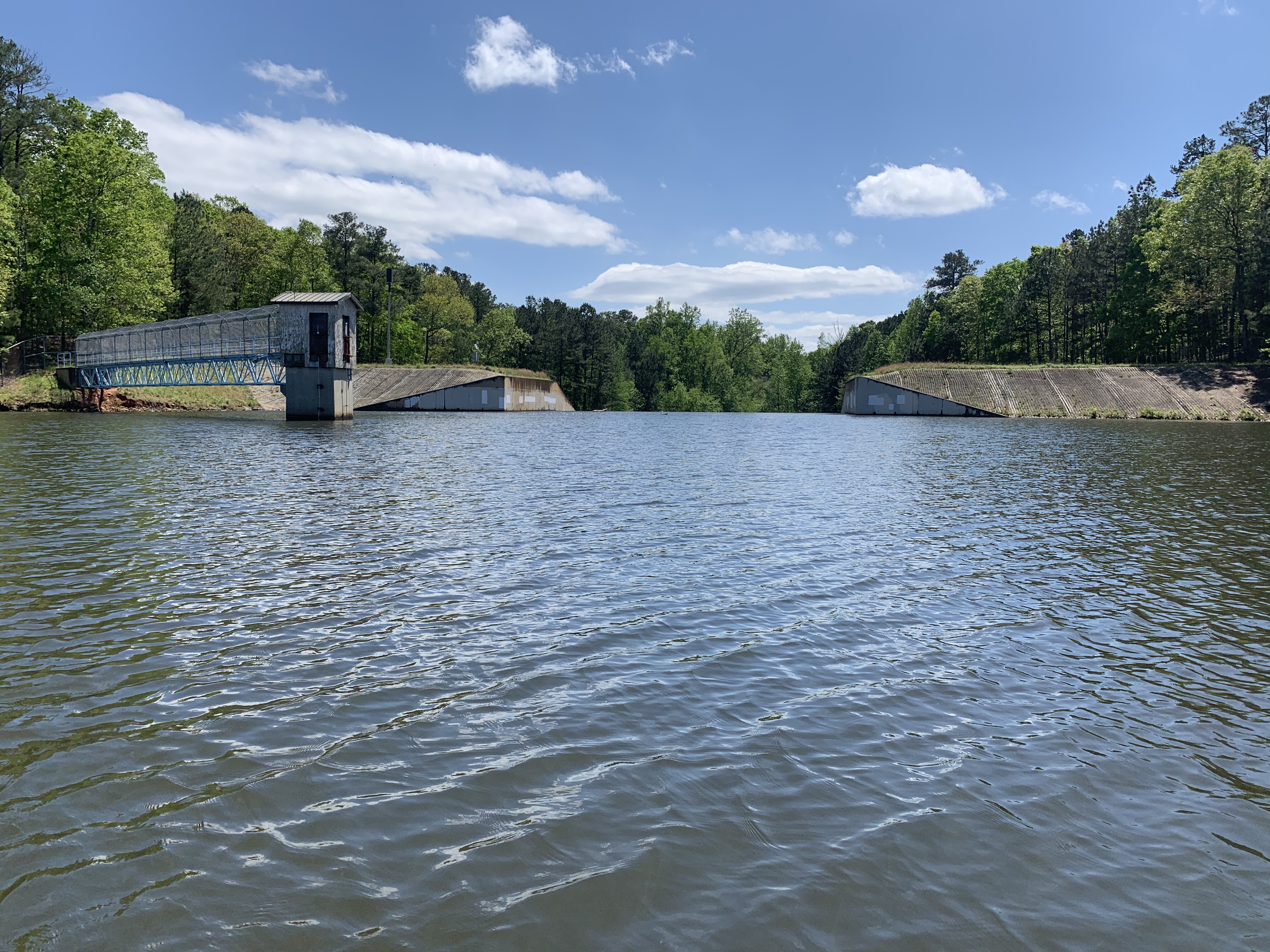
Lake Kedron dam and spillway
