= Peachtree City Lazers =

Recreational soccer club

Lazers Soccer Club
- Full name: Peachtree City Lazers Soccer Club
- Nickname: Lazers
- Founded: 1977; 49 years ago
- Ground: Peachtree City Athletic Complex
- Website: https://www.lazers.soccer
Home colours	Away colours

Lazers Soccer Club is a non-profit recreational soccer club based in Peachtree City, Georgia. The club began play in 1977 and has both youth and adult programs. It serves over 3,300 registrants annually.

== History ==
Lazers S.C. was established in the 1970s, initially using facilities at Drake Field and later Picnic Park in Peachtree City.

In 1980, the original Glenloch Park fields were developed for the club. In 1984, a land exchange between the City of Peachtree City and the Wortmann family added three additional fields at Glenloch Park, which continue to be used by Lazers. During the 1980s, the city also developed Meade Fields, formerly known as South 74.

In the early 1990s, the Peachtree City Athletic Complex, formerly known as the Baseball Soccer Complex, was developed to provide additional soccer and baseball fields. The complex is still used as the team's home fields as of 2026.

In April 2009, Lazers and another local club, AFC Lightning, merged their respective select programs to form a single travel soccer program. Lazers programs are based at the Peachtree City Athletic Complex, with smaller facilities at Handley Park, Glenloch Park, and Braelinn Park. The organization also provides player development camps, coaching education programs, and referee courses at the club and state levels.

== Notable players ==
The club is most known for World Cup winner Kelley O'Hara, who played at Lazers before launching her collegiate and professional career. She played at Lazers from 1997 to 1999.

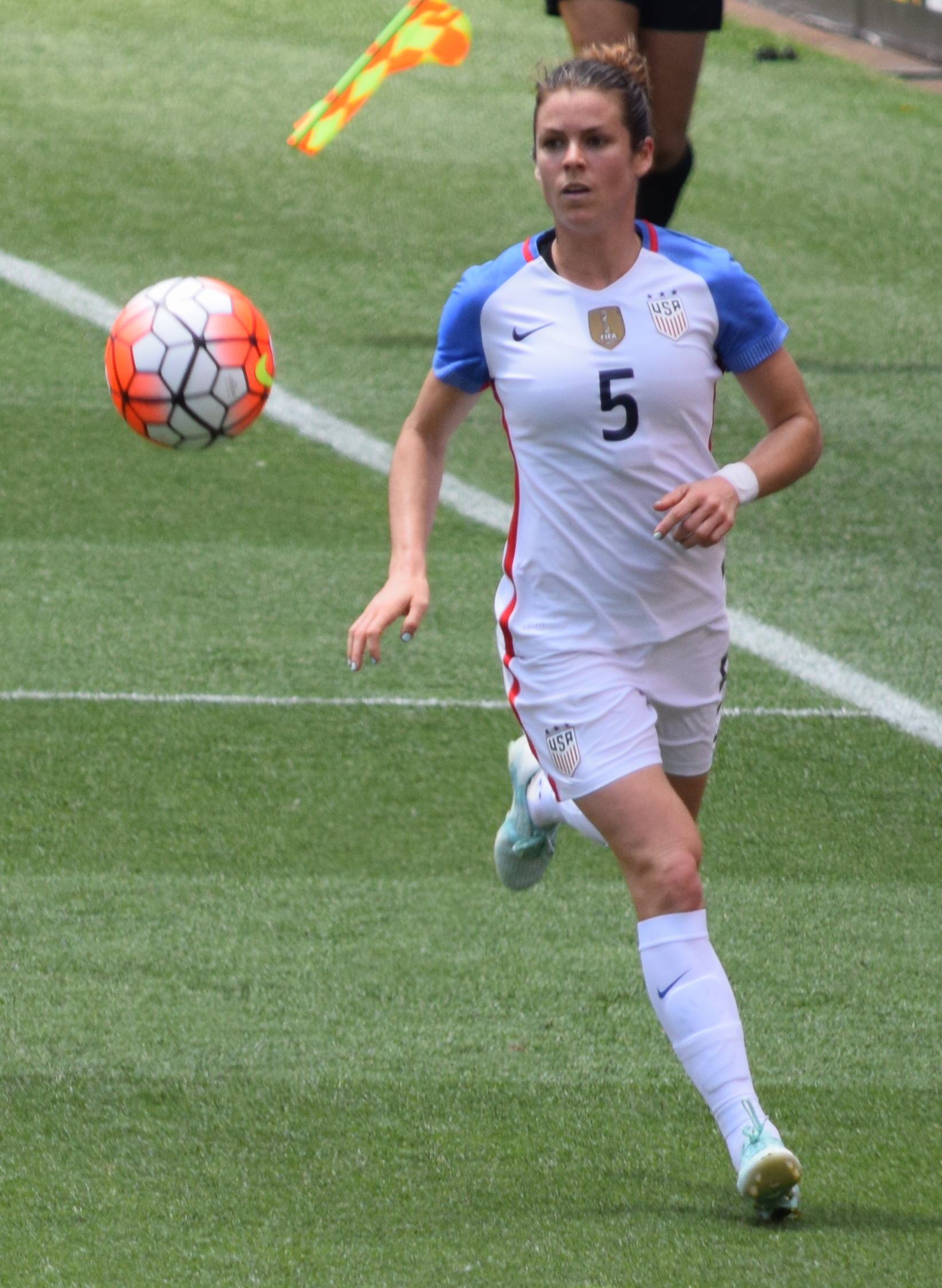
O'Hara played for the club from 1997-1999

== See also ==
- Peachtree City, Georgia
- Recreational sports league
- Association Football
- Kelley O’Hara
- Soccer
