= Just Women's Sports =

American women's sports news website

- Owner: Just Women's Sports Inc.
- Founder: Haley Rosen
- CEO: Haley Rosen
- Website: justwomenssports.com
- Launched: 2020; 6 years ago

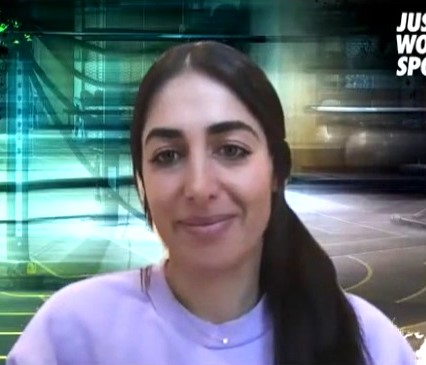
Haley Rosen interviewed by Adweek in 2022

Just Women's Sports (JWS) is an American news website and media company focused on women's sports. It was founded in 2020 by former soccer player Haley Rosen. The company creates content across social, web, and audio platforms, and has produced podcasts by athletes such as Kelley O'Hara, Sam Mewis, Lynn Williams, A'ja Wilson, and Napheesa Collier.

== History ==
Just Women's Sports was founded in January 2020 by Haley Rosen (born June 1, 1993), a former soccer player from Los Angeles, California, who played for the Stanford Cardinal in college and briefly played professionally. She aimed to address the disproportionate lack of media coverage of women in sports (said to be about four percent of all sports coverage). The company began by producing content on its website, newsletter, and social media. In May 2020, Adidas supported the company with a grant for female entrepreneurs in sports.

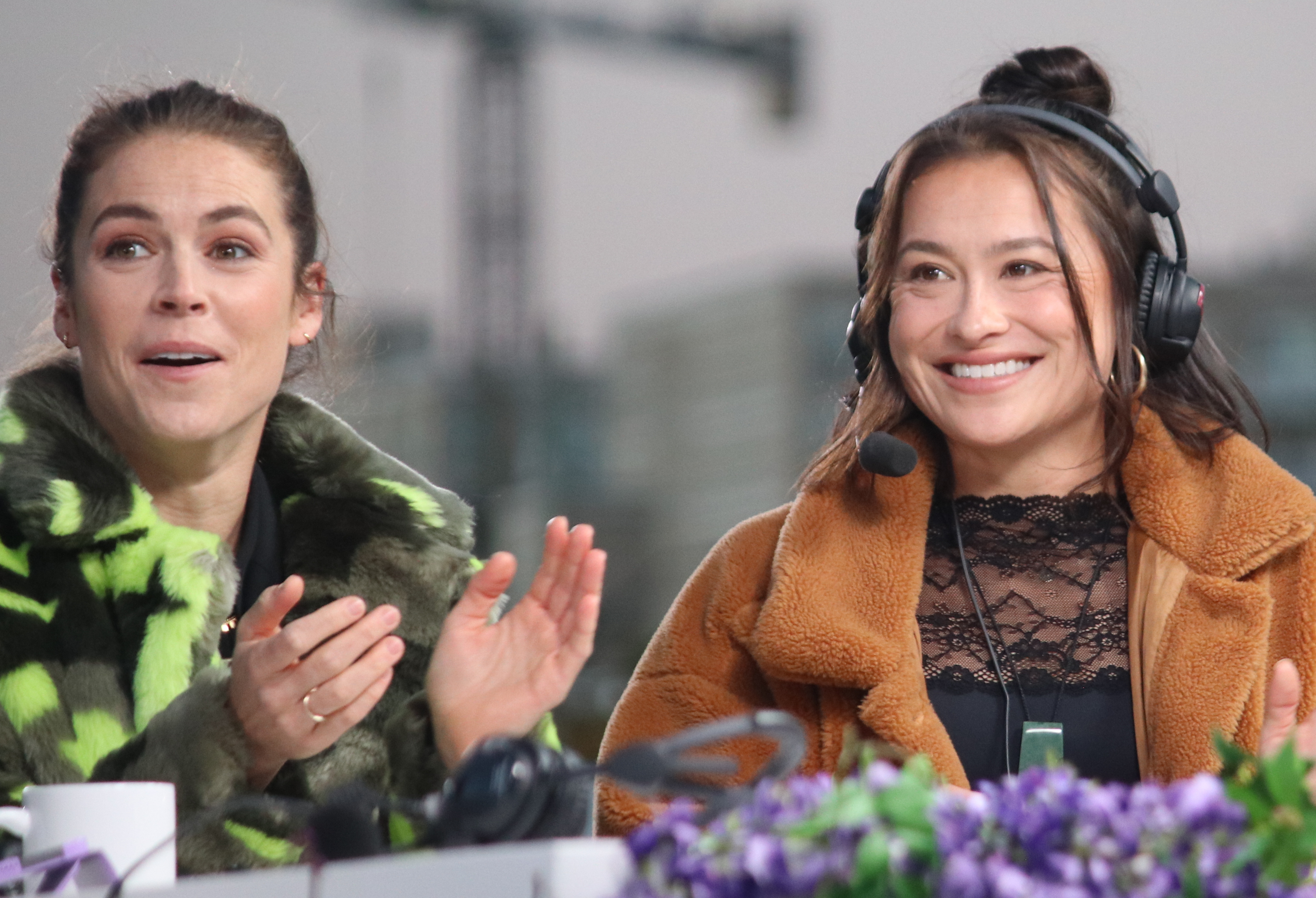
Kelley O'Hara and Ali Riley recording for JWS at the 2022 NWSL Championship

Kelley O'Hara, a former Cardinal player and a two-time World Cup–winning member of the United States national soccer team (USWNT), was approached to advise the company before taking an interest in the idea of hosting a podcast. This became the Just Women's Sports podcast (later The Players' Pod), in which O'Hara interviews leading female athletes about the arc of their lives from childhood through their career. The podcast's first episode came out on July 21, 2020, featuring O'Hara's friend and USWNT teammate Alex Morgan.

A group of venture capitalists including Kevin Durant—plus athletes such as O'Hara, Elena Delle Donne, Hilary Knight, Sam Mewis and Arike Ogunbowale—provided seed funding of US$3.5 million in May 2021, before a further investment group led by Joe Tsai added US$6 million the next year.

Rosen was named to the Forbes 30 Under 30 list in November 2021. In 2022, Rosen delivered a TEDx talk called "The problem with women's sports," which argued that internal stakeholders had hindered the growth of women's sports by mis-marketing athletes and teams.

In 2023, Rosen said the company had reached over 75 million users and generated over 250 million social impressions during the 2023 FIFA Women's World Cup.

== Content ==
Just Women's Sports produces multiple podcasts and web series, along with its daily social and web coverage.

Kelley on the Street (2022–)
YouTube series hosted by Kelley O'Hara. Woman-on-the-street interviews about women's soccer.
Just Women's Sports (2020–2022)
Podcast hosted by Kelley O'Hara. Features interviews with athletes of many sports.
Tea with A & Phee (2020–2021)
Podcast hosted by basketball players A'ja Wilson and Napheesa Collier. Features interviews with basketball players.
Snacks (2021–2023)
Podcast hosted by soccer players Sam Mewis and Lynn Williams. Features interviews with USWNT, NWSL and international soccer players.
The Soccer Show (2021)
YouTube series hosted by soccer player Haley Kopmeyer and soccer coach David Copeland-Smith. Features interviews with soccer players.
Off the Ball (2021–2022)
YouTube series hosted by soccer player Ali Riley, providing behind-the-scenes look at the NWSL.
The Players' Pod (2022)
Podcast hosted by soccer player Kelley O'Hara. Features interviews with athletes of many sports.
NetLife (2022)
Podcast hosted by basketball coach Dawn Staley. Features interviews with basketball players, coaches, and others.
The 91st (2023)
Podcast hosted by soccer player Midge Purce and journalist Katie Nolan. Focuses on the 2023 FIFA Women's World Cup.
