= Learning store =

Store selling educational materials

A learning store is a specialised retailer of materials expressly for the education and development of children of all ages. These materials include toys, books, games, building blocks and music, along with traditional teaching resources and curriculum materials. Some learning stores offer materials for developmentally disabled adults as well. The term learning store was coined in 1984 by the Golden Apple Learning Store. Large chains such as Early Learning Centre now exist and learning stores can now be found in many urban and suburban areas.

== Types of materials ==
Learning stores have traditionally offered less mainstream toys such as BRIO, Playmobil, Melissa & Doug, or toys sold primarily in the speciality toy market. Other resources found at Learning Stores are often published by small educational publishers outside of the mainstream textbook publishing world. Learning stores and their suppliers are generally members of either the American Specialty Toy Retailing Association (ASTRA) or the National School Supply and Equipment Association (NSSEA).

== Other usage ==
A University Learning Store was launched in 2016 to deliver online, on-demand, and skills-focused courses for employees and employers. It was introduced by a group of non-profit universities. A different concept of learning store is also used in business as a strategy within the so-called triple-loop learning. It is a store set-up by a retailer or enterprise to try out radical ideas or innovations.
