= Lake McIntosh =

Reservoir in Georgia, US

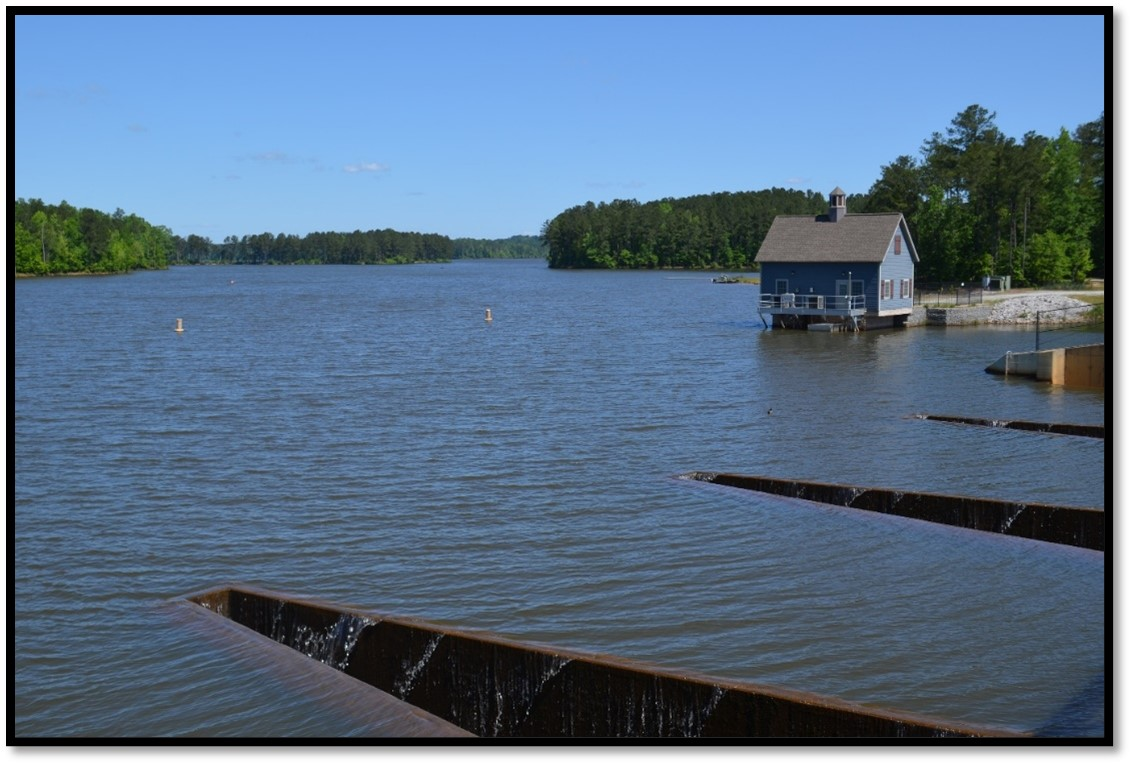

- Location within Georgia
- Location: Fayette County and Coweta County, Georgia
- Coordinates: 33°22′16″N 84°35′35″W
- Type: Reservoir
- Basin countries: United States
- Surface area: 650 acres (260 ha)
- Surface elevation: 830 ft (253 m)

Lake McIntosh is a 650-acre (260 ha) reservoir near Peachtree City in the U.S. state of Georgia. It holds 1.5 billion gallons of water, and supplies 10.4 million gallons a day to the Crosstown Water Treatment Plant.

== Description ==
The lake is managed by Fayette County and is governed by the 2016 Fayette County Reservoir Management Plan. It is located on the west side of Peachtree City, sharing a border with Coweta County. Recreational fishing is allowed with a license, but swimming is prohibited. Lake McIntosh is a man-made lake formed by a portion of Line Creek along with other smaller channels of water flowing into it.

The lake site was initially identified by Peachtree City developers in 1962. The land was purchased by Fayette County in the 1970s. It was in 1981 that the required 404 permit was submitted and then withdrawn over various state and environmental concerns. The permit was re-submitted in 1998 and won approval from the U.S. Army Corps of Engineers in July 2007. And in 2009 the Safe Dams program approved the project.

== Outdoor activities ==
- Bird watching
- Boating — sailboats and boats with electric motors are permitted. There is a boat ramp and two boat docks.
- Fishing
- Geocaching
- Paddling. Canoe and kayak rentals are available commercially nearby.
- Picnicking
- Rowing — Lake McIntosh is home to the Row Georgia rowing club.
- Walking trails
