= McIntosh Lake (Saskatchewan) =

Lake in Saskatchewan, Canada

- Location in Saskatchewan McIntosh Lake (Canada)
- Location: Northern Administration District, Saskatchewan
- Coordinates: 55.8349°N 104.9718°W
- Type: Glacial lake
- Part of: Churchill River drainage basin
- Primary inflows: Paull River
- River sources: Canadian Shield
- Basin countries: Canada
- Surface area: 6,205 ha (15,330 acres)
- Max. depth: 43.4 m (142 ft)
- Shore length^{1}: 193 km (120 mi)
- Surface elevation: 372 m (1,220 ft)
- Settlements: None
- ^{1} Shore length is not a well-defined measure.

McIntosh Lake is a lake in Northern Saskatchewan, Canada, within the Churchill River drainage basin. It is about 75 kilometres (47 mi) north of La Ronge. At the lake's southern end is a fly-in fishing lodge.

McIntosh Lake is a large, irregularly shaped lake with many bays and small islands. It covers an area of 6,205 hectares (15,330 acres), has a shoreline measuring 193 kilometres (120 mi), and is 43.4 metres (142 ft) deep. Its primary inflow is Paull River, which enters the lake at its northern end. A short river from the southern end connects it to Trout Lake of the Churchill River. The Churchill River is largely a series of interconnected lakes that flows east into the Hudson Bay.

Ferguson Bay, which is a long, narrow bay near the lake's northern end, was named in 1951 after Lawrence Arkwright Ferguson. Ferguson, from Lipton, Saskatchewan, was killed in 1943 during World War II.

== Fish species ==
Fish commonly found in McIntosh Lake include walleye, lake trout, northern pike, cisco, longnose sucker, white sucker, burbot, lake whitefish, and yellow perch.

== See also ==
- List of lakes of Saskatchewan
