= National School Supply and Equipment Association =

Trade association

The National School Supply and Equipment Association (NSSEA) is a not-for-profit international trade organization serving the school market, based in the United States. Founded in 1916, NSSEA promotes an open market for quality educational products and services that are produced and delivered by professional suppliers and dealers. NSSEA is made up of over 1,500 member companies involved in the school market industry.
