= 2010 Georgia state elections =

2010 Georgia elections
- November 2, 2010; November 30, 2010

A general election was held in the U.S. state of Georgia on November 2, 2010. All of Georgia's executive officers were up for election, as well as a United States Senate seat, all of Georgia's thirteen seats in the United States House of Representatives and all seats in both houses of the Georgia General Assembly. Primary elections were held on July 20, 2010. Primary runoffs, necessary if no candidate wins a majority of the vote, were held on August 10, 2010. General runoffs were held on November 30, 2010.

In the 2010 general election in Georgia, Republican candidates won all statewide executive offices, the U.S. Senate seat up for election, majorities in both state legislative chambers, and eight out of 13 U.S. House seats.

== United States Senate ==
United States Senate election in Georgia, 2010
Party	Candidate	Votes	%	±%
Republican	Johnny Isakson (incumbent)	1,489,904	58.31%	+0.43%
Democratic	Michael Thurmond	996,516	39.00%	−0.98%
Libertarian	Chuck Donovan	68,750	2.69%	+0.55%
Write-ins		88	0.00%	N/A
Total votes		2,555,258	100.00%	
Republican hold				

== United States House of Representatives ==
United States House of Representatives elections in Georgia, 2010
Party	Votes	Percentage	Seats	+/–
Republican	1,528,142	61.90%	8	+1
Democratic	940,347	38.09%	5	-1
Write-in	191	0.01%	0	

== Governor ==
Incumbent governor Sonny Perdue was ineligible to seek re-election due to term limits. The Republican primary featured four candidates who received over 15% of the vote in the first round: former Secretary of State Karen Handel, former U.S. Representative Nathan Deal, former Georgia State Senator Eric Johnson, and Insurance Commissioner John Oxendine. Handel, Deal, and Johnson all resigned their offices during or shortly before the campaign. Because no candidate received a majority of the vote, the race went to a runoff between the top two candidates, Handel and Deal.

Republican gubernatorial primary results
Party	Candidate	Votes	%
Republican	Karen Handel	231,990	34.1
Republican	Nathan Deal	155,946	22.9
Republican	Eric Johnson	136,792	20.1
Republican	John Oxendine	115,421	17.0
Republican	Jeff Chapman	20,636	3.0
Republican	Ray McBerry	17,171	2.5
Republican	Otis Putnam	2,543	0.4
Total votes		680,499	100

Deal won the runoff narrowly, with a margin of about 0.4%, or 2,519 votes out of 579,551 cast. The Democratic nomination was won easily by former Governor Roy Barnes without a runoff; his most prominent opponent was Attorney General Thurbert Baker.

Republican gubernatorial primary runoff results
Party	Candidate	Votes	%
Republican	Nathan Deal	291,035	50.2
Republican	Karen Handel	288,516	49.8
Total votes		579,551	100

Democratic gubernatorial primary results
Party	Candidate	Votes	%
Democratic	Roy Barnes	259,482	65.6
Democratic	Thurbert Baker	85,571	21.6
Democratic	David Poythress	21,780	5.5
Democratic	DuBose Porter	17,767	4.5
Democratic	Carl Camon	4,170	1.1
Democratic	Bill Bolton	3,573	0.9
Democratic	Randal Mangham	3,124	0.8
Total votes		395,497	100

In the general election, Deal defeated Barnes, becoming just the third Republican to be elected governor of Georgia, after Perdue and Reconstruction-era Governor Rufus Bullock.

Gubernatorial general election results, 2010
Party	Candidate	Votes	%	±%
Republican	Nathan Deal	1,365,832	53.02%	−4.93%
Democratic	Roy Barnes	1,107,011	42.97%	+4.75%
Libertarian	John Monds	103,194	4.01%	+0.17%
Write-ins		124	0.00%	N/A
Turnout		2,576,161	100.00%	
Republican hold				

== Lieutenant governor ==
Incumbent lieutenant governor Casey Cagle was seeking reelection. Carol Porter won the Democratic nomination.

=== Republican primary ===
- Casey Cagle, incumbent lieutenant governor of Georgia

==== Primary results ====
Republican primary results
Party	Candidate	Votes	%
Republican	Casey Cagle (incumbent)	525,287	100%
Total votes		525,287	100%

=== Democratic primary ===
- Tricia Carpenter McCracken, journalist
- Carol Porter, businesswoman and wife of state house minority leader DuBose Porter

==== Primary results ====
Democratic primary results
Party	Candidate	Votes	%
Democratic	Carol Porter	228,245	69.7%
Democratic	Tricia Carpenter McCracken	99,373	30.3%
Total votes		327,618	100%

=== Libertarian ===
- Dan Barber, self-employed
- Rhonda Martini, dentist, dropped out due to family issues

=== General election ===
Lieutenant governor election, 2010
Party	Candidate	Votes	%
Republican	Casey Cagle (incumbent)	1,403,977	54.7%
Democratic	Carol Porter	1,074,624	41.9%
Libertarian	Dan Barber	88,746	3.5%
Total votes		2,567,347	100%

== Secretary of state ==
2010 Georgia Secretary of State election
- November 2, 2010
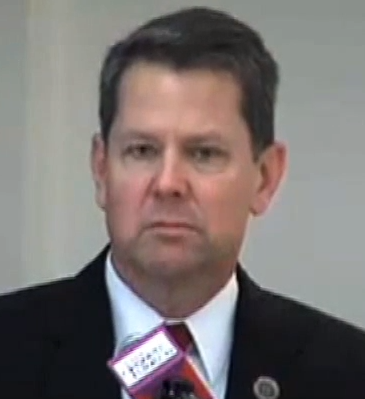

Nominee	Brian Kemp	Georganna Sinkfield
Party	Republican	Democratic
Popular vote	1,440,188	1,006,411
Percentage	56.42%	39.43%
- County results Kemp: 40–50% 50–60% 60–70% 70–80% 80–90% Sinkfield: 40–50% 50–60% 60–70% 70–80%
Secretary of State before election
Brian Kemp
Republican
Elected Secretary of State
Brian Kemp
Republican

Incumbent Secretary of State Brian Kemp, who succeeded Karen Handel after she resigned to focus on her gubernatorial bid, sought election to a full term and won the Republican primary on July 20. Georganna Sinkfield defeated Gail Buckner in a runoff for the Democratic nomination.

=== Republican primary ===
- Brian Kemp, incumbent secretary of state of Georgia
- Doug MacGinnitie, former Sandy Springs councilman

==== Primary results ====
Republican primary results
Party	Candidate	Votes	%
Republican	Brian Kemp (incumbent)	361,304	59.2%
Republican	Doug MacGinnitie	248,911	40.8%
Total votes		610,215	100%

=== Democratic primary ===
- Gail Buckner, state senator
- Gary Horlacher, attorney
- Michael Mills, public relations consultant
- Angela Moore, businesswoman
- Georganna Sinkfield, state representative

==== Primary results ====
Democratic primary results (first round)
Party	Candidate	Votes	%
Democratic	Gail Buckner	119,956	35.1%
Democratic	Georganna Sinkfield	77,423	22.6%
Democratic	Angela Moore	69,942	20.4%
Democratic	Michael Mills	53,020	15.5%
Democratic	Gary Horlacher	21,852	6.4%
Total votes		342,193	100%

Democratic primary runoff results
Party	Candidate	Votes	%
Democratic	Georganna Sinkfield	62,576	61.8%
Democratic	Gail Buckner	38,599	38.2%
Total votes		101,175	100%

=== Libertarian ===
- David Chastain, aeronautics industry analyst

=== General election ===
Secretary of state election, 2010
Party	Candidate	Votes	%
Republican	Brian Kemp (incumbent)	1,440,188	56.4%
Democratic	Georganna Sinkfield	1,006,411	39.4%
Libertarian	David Chastain	106,123	4.2%
Total votes		2,552,722	100%

== Attorney general ==
2010 Georgia Attorney General election
- November 2, 2010
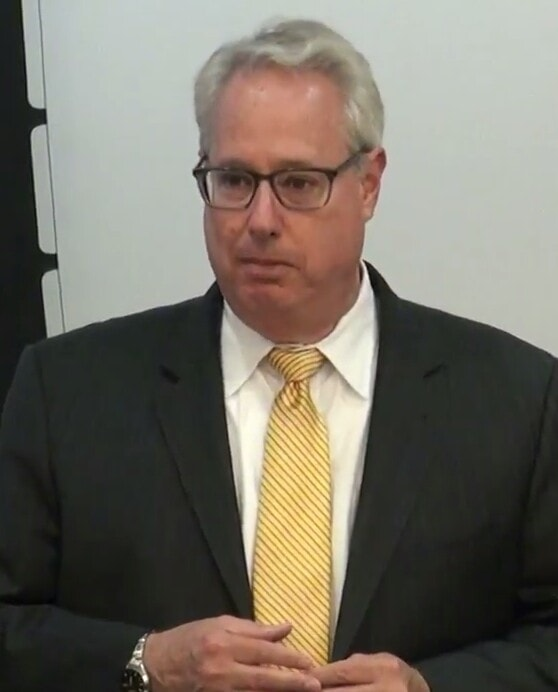

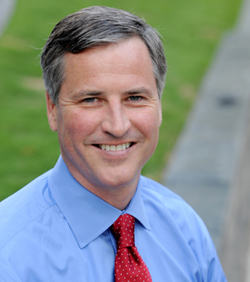
Nominee	Sam Olens	Ken Hodges
Party	Republican	Democratic
Popular vote	1,351,090	1,112,049
Percentage	52.95%	43.58%
- County results Olens: 40–50% 50–60% 60–70% 70–80% 80–90% Hodges: 40–50% 50–60% 60–70% 70–80% 80–90%
Attorney General before election
Thurbert Baker
Democratic
Elected Attorney General
Sam Olens
Republican

Incumbent Attorney General of Georgia Thurbert Baker retired from his position to run for governor of Georgia. Ken Hodges won the Democratic nomination, while Sam Olens defeated Preston Smith in a runoff for the Republican nomination.

=== Democratic primary ===
- Ken Hodges, former Dougherty circuit district attorney
- Rob Teilhet, state representative

==== Primary results ====
Democratic primary results
Party	Candidate	Votes	%
Democratic	Ken Hodges	221,598	65.5%
Democratic	Rob Teilhet	116,714	34.5%
Total votes		338,312	100%

=== Republican primary ===
- Sam Olens, chairman of the Cobb County Commission
- Preston Smith, state senator
- Max Wood, former U.S. attorney

==== Primary results ====
Republican primary results (first round)
Party	Candidate	Votes	%
Republican	Sam Olens	229,769	39.9%
Republican	Preston Smith	176,656	30.6%
Republican	Max Wood	170,067	29.5%
Total votes		576,492	100%

Republican primary runoff results
Party	Candidate	Votes	%
Republican	Sam Olens	299,580	58.9%
Republican	Preston Smith	209,273	41.1%
Total votes		508,853	100%

=== Libertarian ===
- Don Smart, attorney

=== General election ===
Attorney general election, 2010
Party	Candidate	Votes	%
Republican	Sam Olens	1,351,090	52.9%
Democratic	Ken Hodges	1,112,049	43.6%
Libertarian	Don Smart	88,583	3.5%
Total votes		2,551,722	100%
Republican gain from Democratic			

== State school superintendent ==
2010 Georgia State Superintendent of Schools election
- November 2, 2010

Nominee	John Barge	Joe Martin
Party	Republican	Democratic
Popular vote	1,366,355	1,061,124
Percentage	53.5%	41.6%
- County results Barge: 40–50% 50–60% 60–70% 70–80% 80–90% Martin: 40–50% 50–60% 60–70% 70–80%
Superintendent before election
William Bradley Bryant
Republican
Elected Superintendent
John Barge
Republican

Incumbent Superintendent of Education Kathy Cox originally intended to seek re-election, but on May 17 announced that she would resign effective July 1, 2010 in order to take a position as CEO of a new non-profit, the U.S. Education Delivery Institute in Washington D.C. William Bradley Bryant was appointed by Gov. Perdue to fill the vacancy, but failed to qualify to run in the November election as an independent. Joe Martin and John Barge won the Democratic and Republican nominations, respectively.

=== Republican primary ===
- John Barge, school system administrator
- Richard Woods, school administrator

==== Primary results ====
Republican primary results
Party	Candidate	Votes	%
Republican	John Barge	224,857	51.9%
Republican	Richard Woods	208,795	48.1%
Total votes		433,652	100%

=== Democratic primary ===
- Beth Farokhi, university administrator
- Joe Martin, former school board president
- Brian Westlake, teacher

==== Primary results ====
Democratic primary results
Party	Candidate	Votes	%
Democratic	Joe Martin	185,918	54.9%
Democratic	Beth Farokhi	92,678	27.3%
Democratic	Brian Westlake	60,303	17.8%
Total votes		338,899	100%

=== Libertarian ===
- Kira Willis, teacher

=== General election ===
State school superintendent election, 2010
Party	Candidate	Votes	%
Republican	John Barge	1,366,355	53.5%
Democratic	Joe Martin	1,061,124	41.6%
Libertarian	Kira Willis	124,547	4.9%
Write-ins		88	0.0%
Total votes		2,552,114	100%
Republican hold			

== Commissioner of insurance ==
2010 Georgia Insurance and Safety Fire Commissioner election
- November 2, 2010

Nominee	Ralph Hudgens	Mary Squires
Party	Republican	Democratic
Popular vote	1,368,289	1,079,716
Percentage	53.8%	42.4%
- County results Hudgens: 40–50% 50–60% 60–70% 70–80% 80–90% Squires: 40–50% 50–60% 60–70% 70–80% 80–90%
Commissioner before election
John Oxendine
Republican
Elected Commissioner
Ralph Hudgens
Republican

Incumbent Commissioner of Insurance John Oxendine was retiring from his position to run for governor of Georgia. Ralph Hudgens defeated Maria Sheffield in a runoff for the Republican nomination, while Mary Squires was unopposed for the Democratic nomination.

=== Republican primary ===
- Dennis Cain, insurance agent
- Rick Collum, Colquitt County magistrate judge
- Seth Harp, state senator
- Ralph Hudgens, state senator
- Tom Knox, state representative
- John Mamalakis, insurance agent
- Stephen Northington, insurance agent
- Gerry Purcell, health benefits consultant
- Maria Sheffield, attorney

==== Primary results ====
Republican primary results (first round)
Party	Candidate	Votes	%
Republican	Ralph Hudgens	117,462	20.7%
Republican	Maria Sheffield	111,302	19.6%
Republican	Tom Knox	91,930	16.2%
Republican	Gerry Purcell	72,158	12.7%
Republican	Dennis Cain	53,797	9.5%
Republican	Seth Harp	48,265	8.5%
Republican	Rick Collum	29,536	5.2%
Republican	John Mamalakis	21,513	3.8%
Republican	Stephen Northington	21,196	3.7%
Total votes		567,159	100%

Republican primary runoff results
Party	Candidate	Votes	%
Republican	Ralph Hudgens	284,447	55.2%
Republican	Maria Sheffield	230,453	44.8%
Total votes		514,900	100%

=== Democratic primary ===
- Mary Squires, former state senator

==== Primary results ====
Democratic primary results
Party	Candidate	Votes	%
Democratic	Mary Squires	284,765	100%
Total votes		284,765	100%

=== Libertarian ===
- Shane Bruce, blogger

=== General election ===
Commissioner of insurance election, 2010
Party	Candidate	Votes	%
Republican	Ralph Hudgens	1,368,289	53.8%
Democratic	Mary Squires	1,079,716	42.4%
Libertarian	Shane Bruce	96,549	3.8%
Total votes		2,544,554	100%
Republican hold			

== Commissioner of Agriculture ==
2010 Georgia Commissioner of Agriculture election
- November 2, 2010
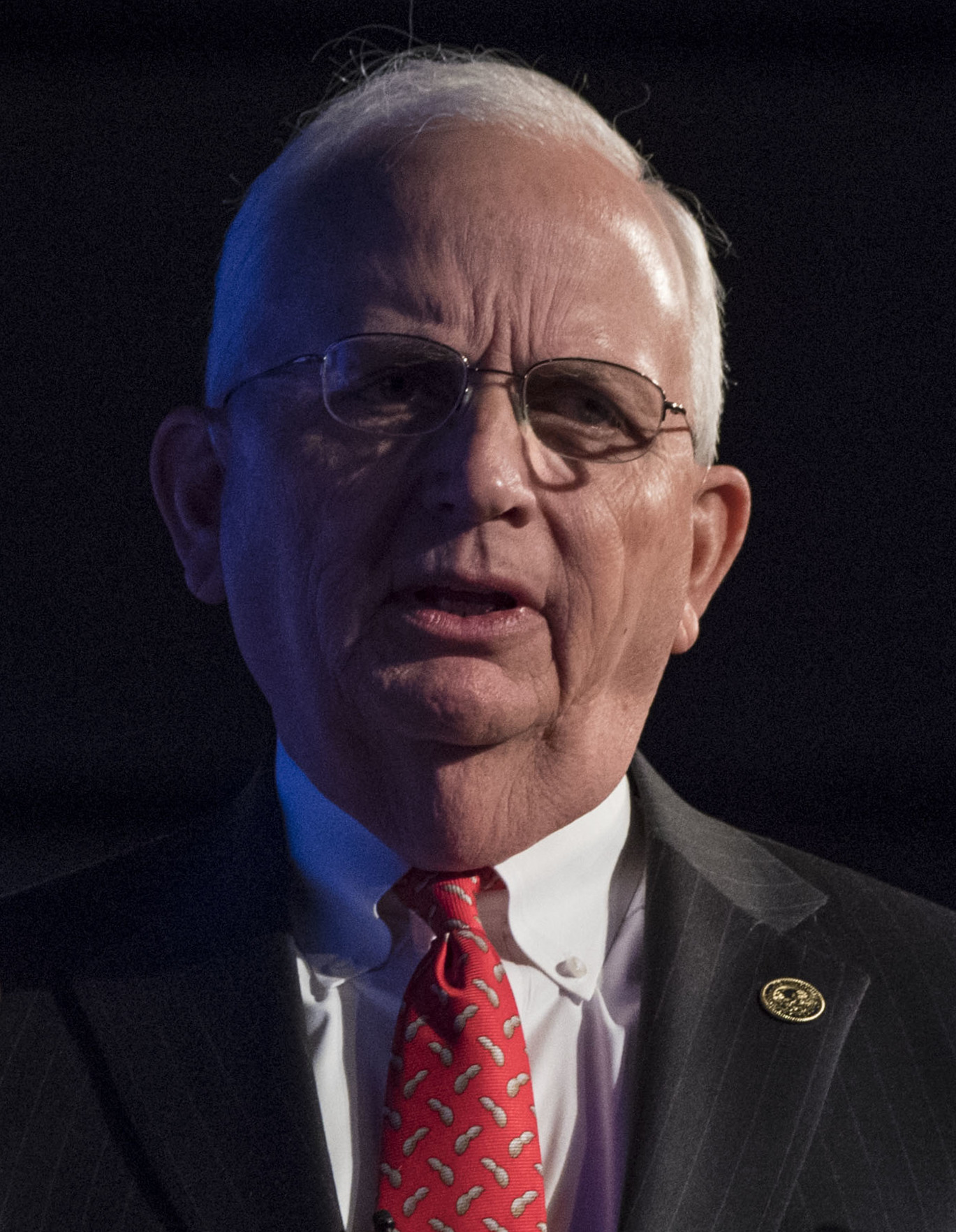

Nominee	Gary Black	J.B. Powell
Party	Republican	Democratic
Popular vote	1,426,746	1,027,373
Percentage	56.0%	40.4%
- County results Black: 40–50% 50–60% 60–70% 70–80% 80–90% Powell: 40–50% 50–60% 60–70% 70–80%
Commissioner before election
Tommy Irvin
Democratic
Elected Commissioner
Gary Black
Republican

Incumbent Commissioner of Agriculture Tommy Irvin was retiring in 2010. Gary Black won the Republican nomination, while J.B. Powell was unopposed for the Democratic nomination.

=== Democratic primary ===
- J.B. Powell, state senator

==== Primary results ====
Democratic primary results
Party	Candidate	Votes	%
Democratic	J.B. Powell	289,833	100%
Total votes		289,833	100%

=== Republican primary ===
- Gary Black, Georgia Agribusiness Council president
- Darwin Carter, former Reagan Administration USDA official

==== Primary results ====
Republican primary results
Party	Candidate	Votes	%
Republican	Gary Black	425,001	76.0%
Republican	Darwin Carter	134,022	24.0%
Total votes		559,023	100%

=== Libertarian ===
- Kevin Cherry

=== General election ===
Commissioner of agriculture election, 2010
Party	Candidate	Votes	%
Republican	Gary Black	1,426,746	56.0%
Democratic	J.B. Powell	1,027,373	40.4%
Libertarian	Kevin Cherry	91,447	3.5%
Total votes		2,545,566	100%
Republican gain from Democratic			

== Commissioner of labor ==
2010 Georgia Commissioner of Labor election
- November 2, 2010

Nominee	Mark Butler	Darryl Hicks
Party	Republican	Democratic
Popular vote	1,399,030	1,042,822
Percentage	55.2%	41.1%
- County results Butler: 40–50% 50–60% 60–70% 70–80% 80–90% Hicks: 40–50% 50–60% 60–70% 70–80% 80–90%
Commissioner before election
Mike Thurmond
Democratic
Elected Commissioner
Mark Butler
Republican

Incumbent Commissioner of Labor Mike Thurmond was retiring from his position to run for the United States Senate. Darryl Hicks narrowly won the Democratic nomination, according to unofficial results, while Mark Butler easily won the Republican nomination.

=== Republican primary ===
- Mark Butler, state representative
- Melvin Everson, state representative

==== Primary results ====
Republican primary results
Party	Candidate	Votes	%
Republican	Mark Butler	374,457	70.3%
Republican	Melvin Everson	158,509	29.7%
Total votes		532,966	100%

=== Democratic primary ===
- Terry Coleman, deputy commissioner of agriculture and former state house speaker
- Darryl Hicks, attorney, lobbyist, community activist

==== Primary results ====
Primary results by county Hicks: 50–60%; 60–70%; 70–80%; Coleman: 50–60%; 60–70%; 70–80%; 80–90%; >90%

Democratic primary results
Party	Candidate	Votes	%
Democratic	Darryl Hicks	167,019	50.1%
Democratic	Terry Coleman	166,423	49.9%
Total votes		333,442	100%

=== Libertarian ===
- Will Costa

=== General election ===
Commissioner of labor election, 2010
Party	Candidate	Votes	%
Republican	Mark Butler	1,399,030	55.2%
Democratic	Darryl Hicks	1,042,822	41.1%
Libertarian	Will Costa	93,310	3.7%
Total votes		2,535,162	100%
Republican gain from Democratic			

== Public Service Commission ==
In 2010, one seat on the Georgia Public Service Commission was up for election. Though candidates must come from the districts that they wish to represent on the commission, they are elected statewide.

=== District 2 (Eastern) ===
2010 Georgia Public Service Commission District 2 election
- November 2, 2010
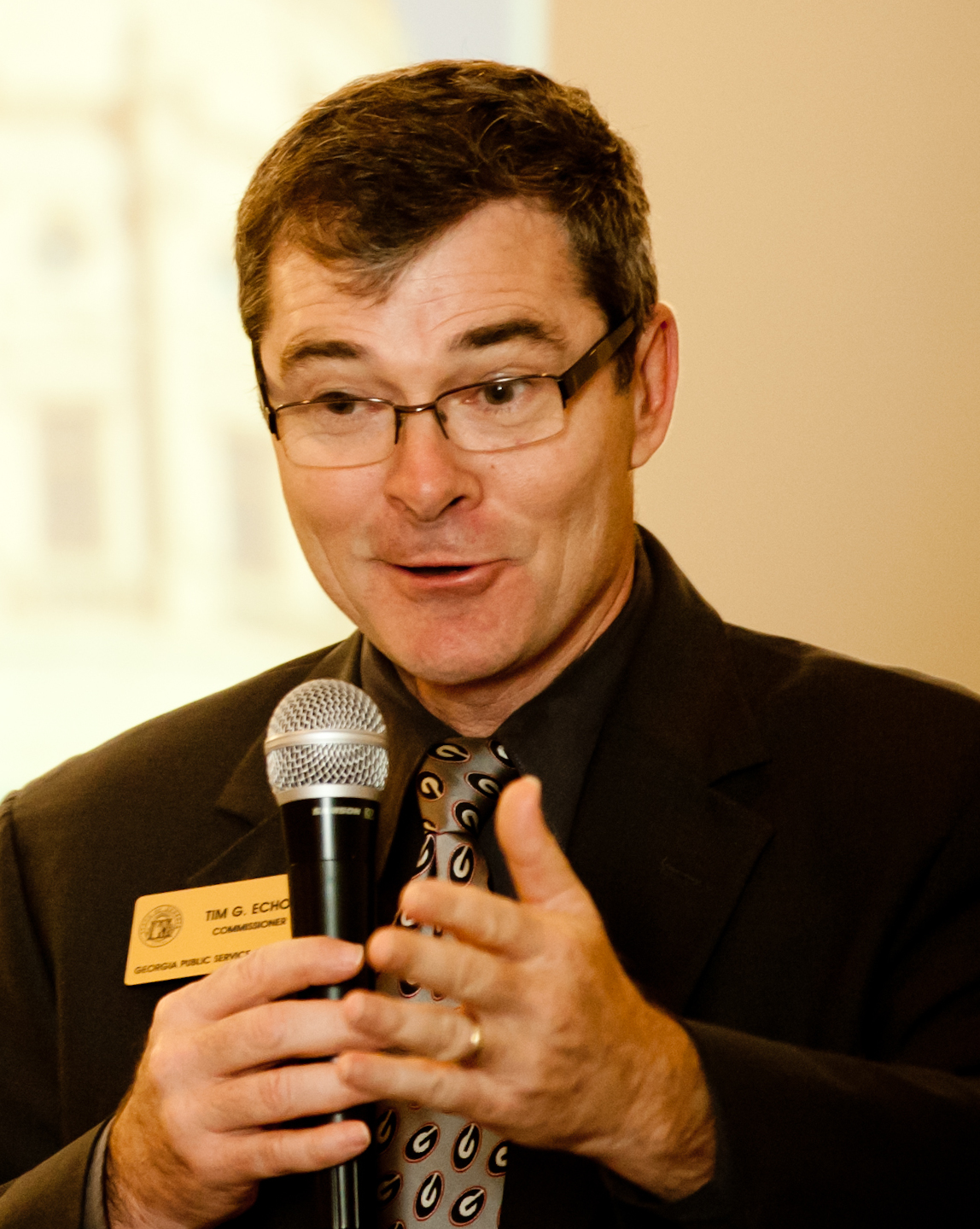

Nominee	Tim Echols	Keith Moffett
Party	Republican	Democratic
Popular vote	1,406,713	1,029,614
Percentage	55.57%	40.62%
- County results Echols: 40–50% 50–60% 60–70% 70–80% 80–90% Moffett: 40–50% 50–60% 60–70% 70–80% 80–90%
Commissioner before election
Bobby Baker
Republican
Elected Commissioner
Tim Echols
Republican

Incumbent Public Service Commissioner Bobby Baker (R) was retiring in 2010. Tim Echols defeated John Douglas in a runoff for the Republican nomination, while Keith Moffett was unopposed for the Democratic nomination.

==== Republican primary ====
- Joey Brush, developer
- John Douglas, state senator
- Tim Echols, non-profit executive
- Jeff May, state representative

===== Primary results =====
Republican primary results (first round)
Party	Candidate	Votes	%
Republican	Tim Echols	185,950	35.1%
Republican	John Douglas	145,938	27.6%
Republican	Jeff May	117,411	22.2%
Republican	Joey Brush	80,146	15.1%
Total votes		529,445	100%

Republican primary runoff results
Party	Candidate	Votes	%
Republican	Tim Echols	248,226	52.3%
Republican	John Douglas	226,292	47.7%
Total votes		474,518	100%

==== Democratic primary ====
- Keith Moffett

===== Primary results =====
Democratic primary results
Party	Candidate	Votes	%
Democratic	Keith Moffett	281,859	100%
Total votes		281,859	100%

==== Libertarian ====
- Jim Sendelbach, psychotherapist and 2007 10th Congressional district House candidate

==== General election ====
Public Service Commission District 2 election, 2010
Party	Candidate	Votes	%
Republican	Tim Echols	1,406,713	55.6%
Democratic	Keith Moffett	1,029,614	40.7%
Libertarian	Jim Sendelbach	94,950	3.7%
Total votes		2,531,277	100%
Republican hold			

== Georgia General Assembly ==
All 56 seats in the Georgia State Senate and 180 seats in the Georgia House of Representatives were up for election.

=== Georgia State Senate ===
Party	Before	After	Change
Republican	34	35	▲1
Democratic	22	21	▼1
Total	56	56	

=== Georgia House of Representatives ===
Party	Before	After	Change
Republican	105	108	▲3
Democratic	74	71	▼3
Independent	1	1	Steady
Total	180	180	

== Judicial elections ==
One seat on the Georgia Supreme Court and three seats on the Georgia Court of Appeals were up for nonpartisan statewide elections. Of these, two were contested: Supreme Court justice David Nahmias faced challengers in his bid for reelection while lawyer Chris McFadden was elected to an open seat on the Court of Appeals.

=== Georgia Supreme Court, Nahmias seat ===
==== Candidates ====
- Tammy Lynn Adkins
- David Nahmias, incumbent justice
- Matt Wilson

==== General election ====
Runoff results by county Nahmias: >90%; 80–90%; 70–80%; 60–70%; 50–60%; Adkins: 50–60%

2010 Georgia Supreme Court election (first round)
Party	Candidate	Votes	%
Nonpartisan	David Nahmias (incumbent)	1,007,828	48.2%
Nonpartisan	Tammy Lynn Adkins	735,799	35.2%
Nonpartisan	Matt Wilson	346,537	16.6%
Total votes		2,090,164	100%

2010 Georgia Supreme Court runoff election
Party	Candidate	Votes	%
Nonpartisan	David Nahmias (incumbent)	176,627	67.0%
Nonpartisan	Tammy Lynn Adkins	86,938	33.0%
Total votes		263,565	100%

=== Georgia Court of Appeals, Johnson seat ===
==== Candidates ====
- James Babalola
- Antoinette Davis
- Stan Gunter
- Adrienne Hunter-Strothers
- Chris McFadden
- David N. Schaeffer

==== General election ====
Runoff results by county McFadden: 80–90%; 70–80%; 60–70%; 50–60%; Davis: 60–70%; 50–60%

2010 Georgia Court of Appeals election (first round)
Party	Candidate	Votes	%
Nonpartisan	Antoinette Davis	477,113	25.5%
Nonpartisan	Chris McFadden	422,996	22.6%
Nonpartisan	David N. Schaeffer	336,281	18.0%
Nonpartisan	Adrienne Hunter-Strothers	226,949	12.1%
Nonpartisan	Stan Gunter	213,857	11.4%
Nonpartisan	James Babalola	193,303	10.3%
Total votes		1,870,499	100%

2010 Georgia Court of Appeals runoff election
Party	Candidate	Votes	%
Nonpartisan	Chris McFadden	157,790	62.0%
Nonpartisan	Antoinette Davis	96,737	38.0%
Total votes		254,527	100%

== Ballot measures ==
Six statewide ballot measures appeared on the ballot.

2010 Georgia ballot measures
Name	Description	Votes				Type
Name	Description	Yes	%	No	%	Type
Amendment 1	Allows the enforcement of contracts that restrict competition during or after the term of employment.	1,633,066	67.58	783,390	32.42	Legislatively referred constitutional amendment
Amendment 2	Imposes a $10 fee on car registration; funds directed to trauma care centers.	1,207,836	47.36	1,342,555	52.64	Legislatively referred constitutional amendment
Amendment 3	Authorizes state multiyear contracts for long-term transportation projects.	1,212,863	49.92	1,216,780	50.08	Legislatively referred constitutional amendment
Amendment 4	Authorizes state multiyear contracts for energy efficiency and conservation projects.	1,480,273	60.80	954,448	39.20	Legislatively referred constitutional amendment
Amendment 5	Allows owners of industrial-zoned property to remove the industrial designation.	1,520,636	63.50	873,890	36.50	Legislatively referred constitutional amendment
Referendum A	Provides for inventory of businesses to be exempt from state property tax.	1,310,116	54.01	1,115,586	45.99	Legislatively referred constitutional amendment
Source: Georgia Secretary of State

Results by county

Amendment 1 results by county
Yes:
- 50–60%
- 60–70%
- 70–80%
- 80–90%

Amendment 2 results by county
Yes:
- 50–60%
- 60–70%
No:
- 50–60%
- 60–70%
- 70–80%
- 80–90%

Amendment 3 results by county
Yes:
- 50–60%
- 60–70%
No:
- 50–60%
- 60–70%

Amendment 4 results by county
Yes:
- 50–60%
- 60–70%
- 70–80%
No:
- 50–60%
Other:
- Tie

Amendment 5 results by county
Yes:
- 50–60%
- 60–70%
- 70–80%

Amendment 6 results by county
Yes:
- 50–60%
- 60–70%
No:
- 50–60%
