= 2006 Georgia state elections =

2006 Georgia elections
- November 7, 2006

In the 2006 Georgia elections, Incumbent Governor Sonny Perdue, the first Republican Governor of Georgia since reconstruction, was re-elected over then-Lieutenant Governor Mark Taylor (D).

Prior to the elections, though Republicans held the Governor's mansion and majorities in both houses of the Georgia General Assembly, Democrats then-held five of the eight statewide offices. Following the elections, Republicans would pick up two positions, those being Lieutenant Governor and Secretary of State, with the victories of Casey Cagle (who became the eleventh overall and first ever Republican elected Lieutenant Governor) and Karen Handel (who became the twenty-sixth overall and first Republican since reconstruction to be Secretary of State) in each of their respective races. Both positions were open after the incumbent office holders chose to seek the governorship of Georgia.

All other state Executive Officers, Attorney General of Georgia Thurbert Baker (D), state Superintendent of Schools Kathy Cox (R), Commissioner of Insurance John Oxendine (R), Commissioner of Agriculture Tommy Irvin (D), and Commissioner of Labor Mike Thurmond (D), were re-elected. This was the last time Democrats won a statewide election in Georgia until 2020 when Democrat Joe Biden won the state in the presidential election, the last time Democrats won statewide office in Georgia until Jon Ossoff and Raphael Warnock were elected to the Senate in 2021, as well as the last time Democrats won state-level office until the 2025 special elections for Public Service Commission.

== Federal elections ==
=== United States Congressional elections ===
In 2006, all thirteen of Georgia's U.S. House seats were up for election. Neither of the Peach state's U.S. Senate seats were up for election that year.

==== United States House of Representatives elections ====
All thirteen of Georgia's incumbent Representatives sought re-election in 2006. Going into the elections, Republicans held seven of Georgia's U.S. House seats and Democrats held six seats.

Despite significant gains by Republicans in Georgia since 2002, such as consecutive Republican victories since in Presidential elections since 1996, gaining both of Georgia's U.S. Senate seats, the election of Sonny Perdue as Georgia's first post-Reconstruction Republican governor in 2002, successful elections of Republicans to other state executive offices, and gaining control of both chambers of the Georgia General Assembly for the first time since Reconstruction, Democrats have succeeded in gaining seats of Georgia's House delegation in recent House elections.

Following gains in both houses of the General Assembly in 2002 and 2004, Republicans enacted a mid-decade redistricting to alter the congressional districts created by the 146th Georgia General Assembly, which Democrats held control of at the time, with the intention of benefiting Republicans. Two Democratic incumbents who were especially targeted were Jim Marshall (GA-8) and John Barrow (GA-12). They were opposed respectively by former Representatives Mac Collins (who previously represented what is now the Third district) and Max Burns. These two races were among the most competitive in the nation, but ultimately resulted in both incumbents being re-elected by razor thin margins of 1 and 0.6 percentage points respectively.

The partisan makeup of Georgia's House delegation did not change, however one Incumbent, Cynthia McKinney (GA-4), was denied renomination by her 59% to 41% defeat in the Democratic Primary runoff to then-Dekalb county Commissioner Hank Johnson.

== Governor ==
In the Republican primary, incumbent Sonny Perdue defeated challenger Ray McBerry by a margin of 88 percent to 12 percent. In the Democratic primary, Lieutenant Governor Mark Taylor defeated state Secretary of State Cathy Cox, Bill Bolton, and Mac McCarley with 51.7 percent of the vote to Cox's 44 percent, Bolton's 2 percent, and McCarley 2 percent. Libertarian Garrett Michael Hayes faced Perdue Mark Taylor in the general election. Independent John Dashler withdrew from the race, unable to collect the 40,000 signatures required for ballot access.

Perdue was re-elected to a second term, winning 57.9 percent of the vote.

== Lieutenant governor ==
=== General election results ===
2006 Lieutenant Governor election, Georgia
Party	Candidate	Votes	%
Republican	Casey Cagle	1,134,517	54.1
Democratic	Jim Martin	887,506	42.3
Libertarian	Allen Buckley	75,673	3.6

==== Primary results ====
Democrats

Georgia Democratic July Primary, 2006
Candidate	Votes	%
Jim Martin	184,635	41.2
Greg Hecht	163,004	36.4
Steen Miles	64,714	14.4
Griffin Lotson	22,378	5.0
Rufus Terrill	13,375	3.0

Georgia Democratic August Runoff, 2006
Candidate	Votes	%
Jim Martin	141,927	62.4
Greg Hecht	85,399	37.6

Republicans

Georgia Republican July Primary, 2006
Candidate	Votes	%
Casey Cagle	227,968	56
Ralph Reed	178,790	44

Libertarian

- Allen Buckley

== Secretary of State ==
2006 Georgia Secretary of State election
- November 7, 2006
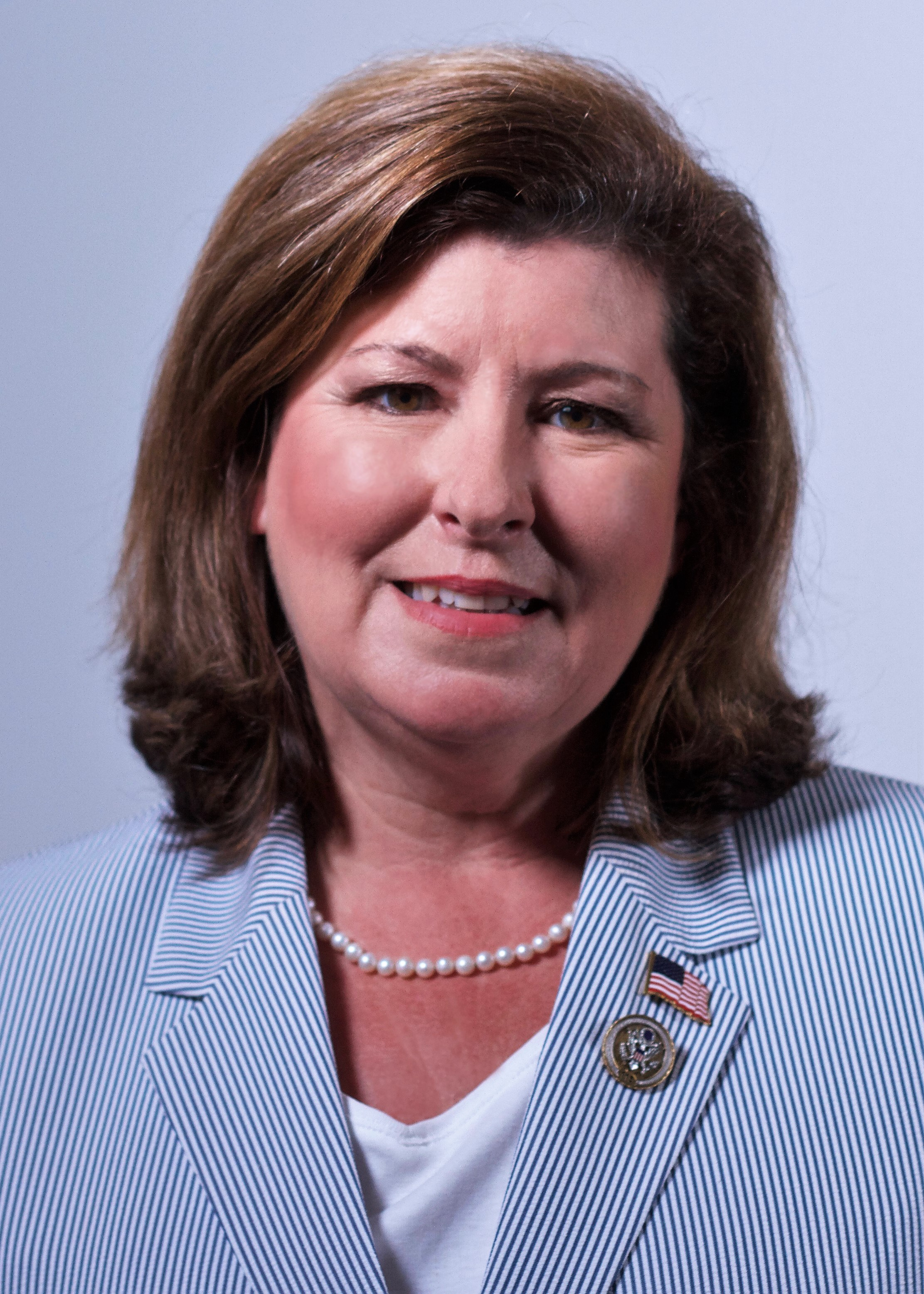

Nominee	Karen Handel	Gail Buckner
Party	Republican	Democratic
Popular vote	1,116,216	862,412
Percentage	54.10%	41.80%
- County results Handel: 40–50% 50–60% 60–70% 70–80% Buckner: 40–50% 50–60% 60–70% 70–80%
Secretary of State before election
Cathy Cox
Democratic
Elected Secretary of State
Karen Handel
Republican

=== General Election Results ===
2006 Secretary of State election, Georgia
Party	Candidate	Votes	%
Republican	Karen Handel	1,116,216	54.1
Democratic	Gail Buckner	862,412	41.8
Libertarian	Kevin Madsen	84,670	4.1

==== Primary results ====
Democrats

Georgia Democratic July Primary, 2006
Candidate	Votes	%
Gail Buckner	107,554	25.4
Darryl Hicks	92,742	21.9
Angela Moore	74,218	17.5
Shyam Reddy	69,802	16.5
Scott Holcomb	48,738	11.5
Walter Ray	29,992	7.1

Georgia Democratic August Runoff, 2006
Candidate	Votes	%
Gail Buckner	119,238	55.1
Darryl Hicks	97,061	44.9

Republicans

Georgia Republican July Primary, 2006
Candidate	Votes	%
Karen Handel	160,542	43.6
Bill Stephens	120,173	32.6
Charlie Bailey	50,792	13.8
Eric Martin	36,932	10

Georgia Republican August Runoff, 2006
Candidate	Votes	%
Karen Handel	96,931	56.6
Bill Stephens	74,198	43.4

Libertarian

- Kevin Madsen

== Attorney general ==
2006 Georgia Attorney General election
- November 7, 2006
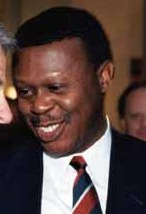

Nominee	Thurbert Baker	Perry McGuire
Party	Democratic	Republican
Popular vote	1,185,366	888,288
Percentage	57.16%	42.84%
- County results Baker: 50–60% 60–70% 70–80% 80–90% McGuire: 50–60% 60–70% Tie: 50%
Attorney General before election
Thurbert Baker
Democratic
Elected Attorney General
Thurbert Baker
Democratic

=== General Election Results ===
2006 Attorney General election, Georgia
Party	Candidate	Votes	%
Democratic	Thurbert Baker (incumbent)	1,185,366	57.2
Republican	Perry McGuire	888,288	42.8

== State School Superintendent ==
2006 Georgia State Superintendent of Schools election
- November 7, 2006
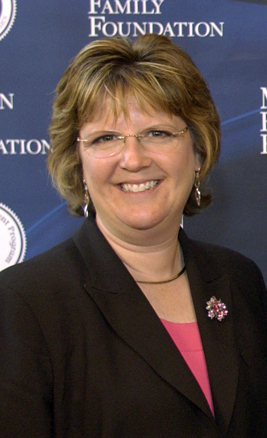

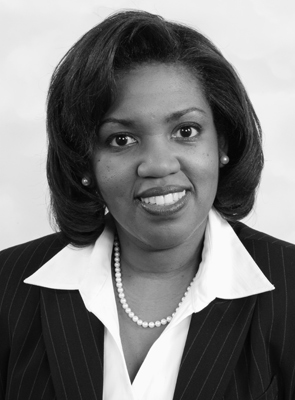
Nominee	Kathy Cox	Denise Majette
Party	Republican	Democratic
Popular vote	1,257,236	734,702
Percentage	59.92%	35.02%
- County results Cox: 40–50% 50–60% 60–70% 70–80% Majette: 40–50% 50–60% 60–70%
Superintendent before election
Kathy Cox
Republican
Elected Superintendent
Kathy Cox
Republican

=== General election results ===
2006 State School Superintendent election, Georgia
Party	Candidate	Votes	%
Republican	Kathy Cox	1,257,236	54.2
Democratic	Denise Majette	734,702	43.0
Libertarian	David Chastain	106,215	2.8

==== Primary election results ====
Democrats

Georgia Democratic July Primary, 2006
Candidate	Votes	%
Denise Majette	288,564	67.1
Carlotta Harrell	141,630	32.9

Republicans

Georgia Republican July Primary, 2006
Candidate	Votes	%
Kathy Cox	259,711	64.7
Danny Carter	141,582	35.3

Libertarian

- David Chastain

== Commissioner of Insurance ==
2006 Georgia Commissioner of Insurance election
- November 7, 2006
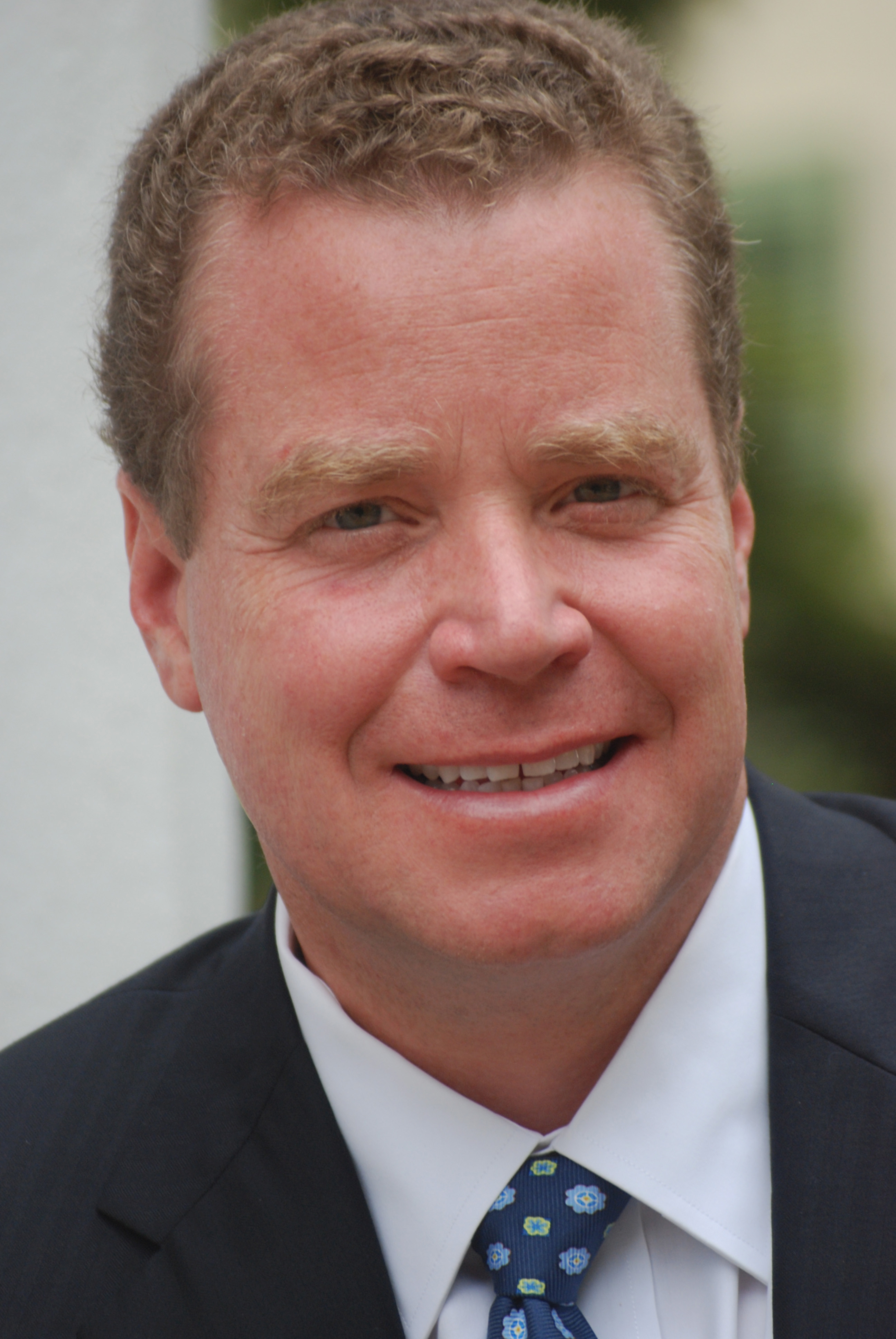

Nominee	John Oxendine	Guy Drexinger
Party	Republican	Democratic
Popular vote	1,349,979	700,837
Percentage	65.47%	34.53%
- Oxendine: 50–60% 60–70% 70–80% 80–90% Drexinger: 50–60% 60–70%
Commissioner before election
John Oxendine
Democratic
Elected Commissioner
John Oxendine
Republican

=== General Election Results ===
As of 2025, this is the last time Fulton County, the state's largest county and home to Atlanta, voted Republican in a contested statewide election.

2006 Commissioner of Insurance election, Georgia
Party	Candidate	Votes	%
Republican	John Oxendine (incumbent)	1,357,770	65.6
Democratic	Guy Drexinger	713,324	34.4

== Commissioner of Agriculture ==
2006 Georgia Commissioner of Agriculture Election
- November 7, 2006
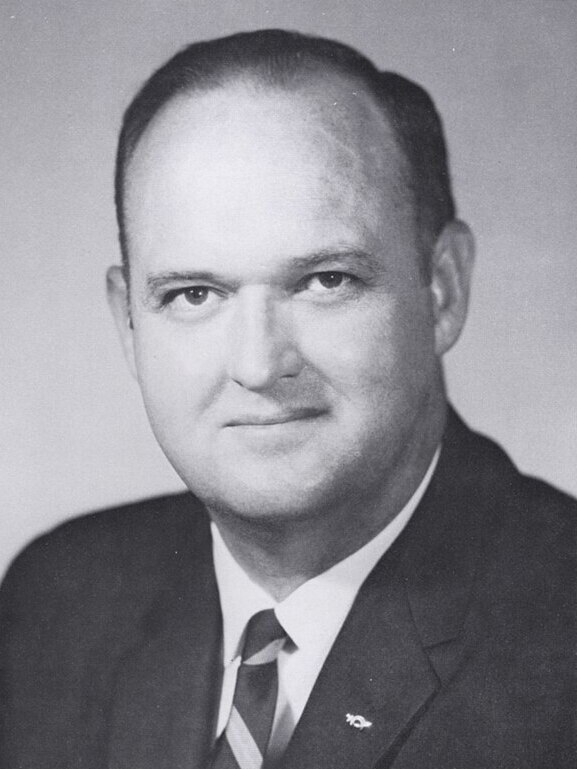

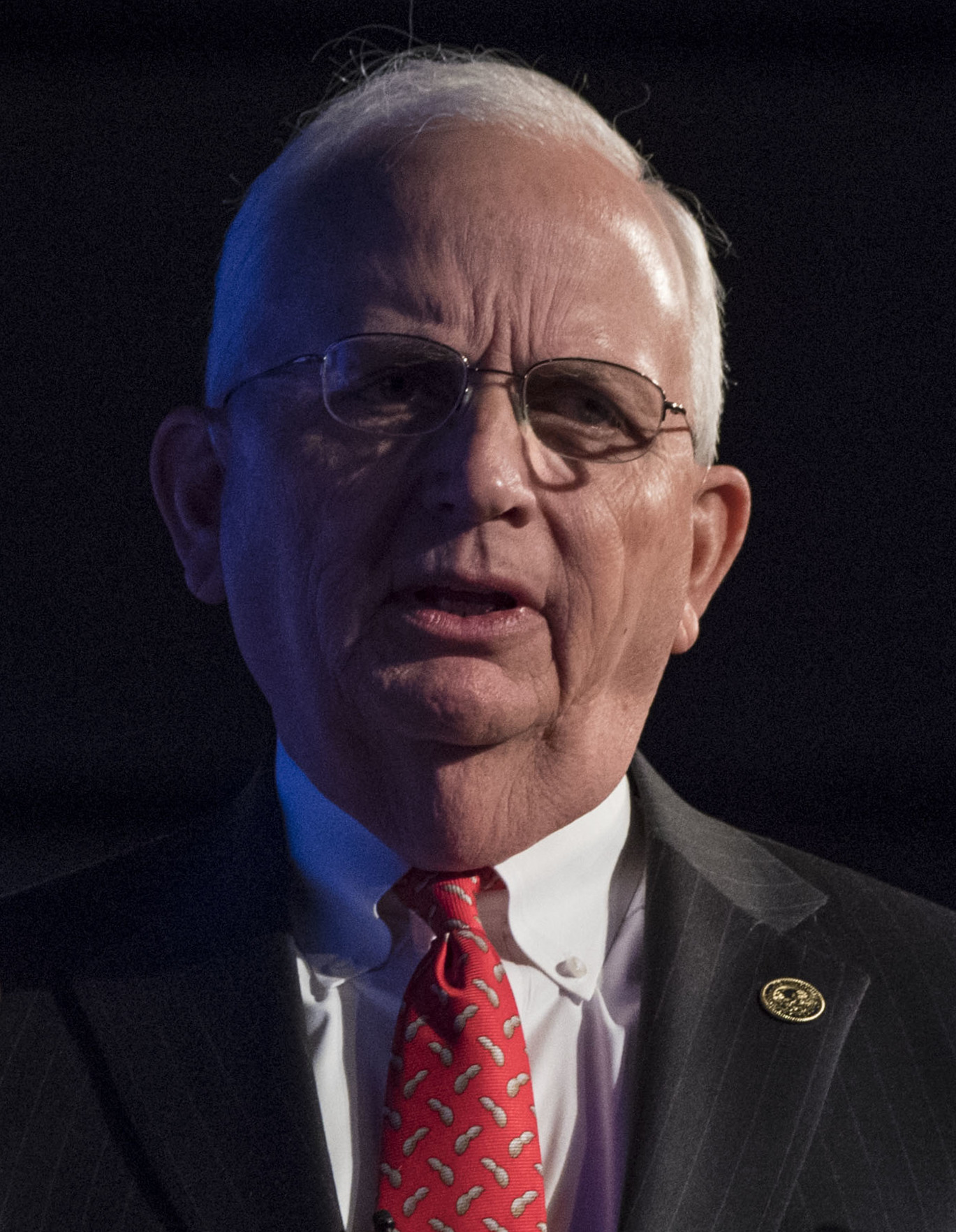
Nominee	Tommy Irvin	Gary Black
Party	Democratic	Republican
Popular vote	1,168,371	846,395
Percentage	56.04%	40.60%
- County results Irvin: 40–50% 50–60% 60–70% 70–80% 80–90% Black: 40–50% 50–60% 60–70%
Commissioner before election
Tommy Irvin
Democratic
Elected Commissioner
Tommy Irvin
Democratic

=== General Election Results ===
2006 Commissioner of Agriculture election, Georgia
Party	Candidate	Votes	%
Democratic	Tommy Irvin (incumbent)	1,168,371	56.0
Republican	Gary Black	846,395	40.6
Libertarian	Jack Cashin	70,015	3.4

==== Primary results ====
Democrats

- Tommy Irvin (incumbent)

Republicans

Georgia Republican July Primary, 2006
Candidate	Votes	%
Gary Black	153,568	42.3
Brian Kemp	97,113	26.8
Bob Greer	57,813	15.9
Deanna Strickland	54,318	15.0

Georgia Republican August Runoff, 2006
Candidate	Votes	%
Gary Black	101,274	60.0
Brian Kemp	67,509	40.0

Libertarian

- Jack Cashin

== Commissioner of Labor ==
2006 Georgia Labor Commissioner election
- November 7, 2006
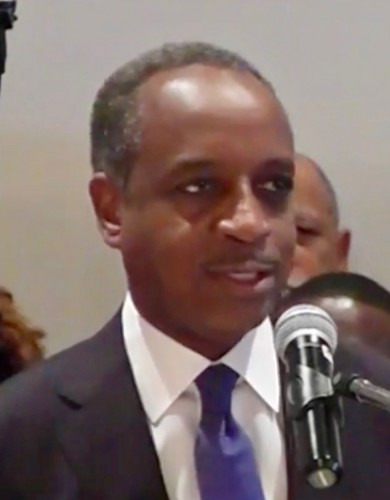

Nominee	Mike Thurmond	Brent Brown
Party	Democratic	Republican
Popular vote	1,127,182	929,812
Percentage	54.80%	45.20%
- County results Thurmond: 50–60% 60–70% 70–80% 80–90% Brown: 50–60% 60–70% 70–80%
Commissioner before election
Mike Thurmond
Democratic
Elected Commissioner
Mike Thurmond
Democratic

=== General election results ===
2006 Commissioner of Labor election, Georgia
Party	Candidate	Votes	%
Democratic	Mike Thurmond (incumbent)	1,127,182	54.8
Republican	Brent Brown	929,812	45.2

==== Primary election results ====
Democrats

- Michael Thurmond (incumbent)

Republicans

Georgia Republican July Primary, 2006
Candidate	Votes	%	±
Brent Brown	225,286	70.3	
Chuck Scheid	94,998	29.7	

== Public Service Commission ==
=== District 3 ===
This is a statewide race.

2006 Georgia Public Service Commission District 3 election
- November 7, 2006 (first round); December 5, 2006 (runoff)
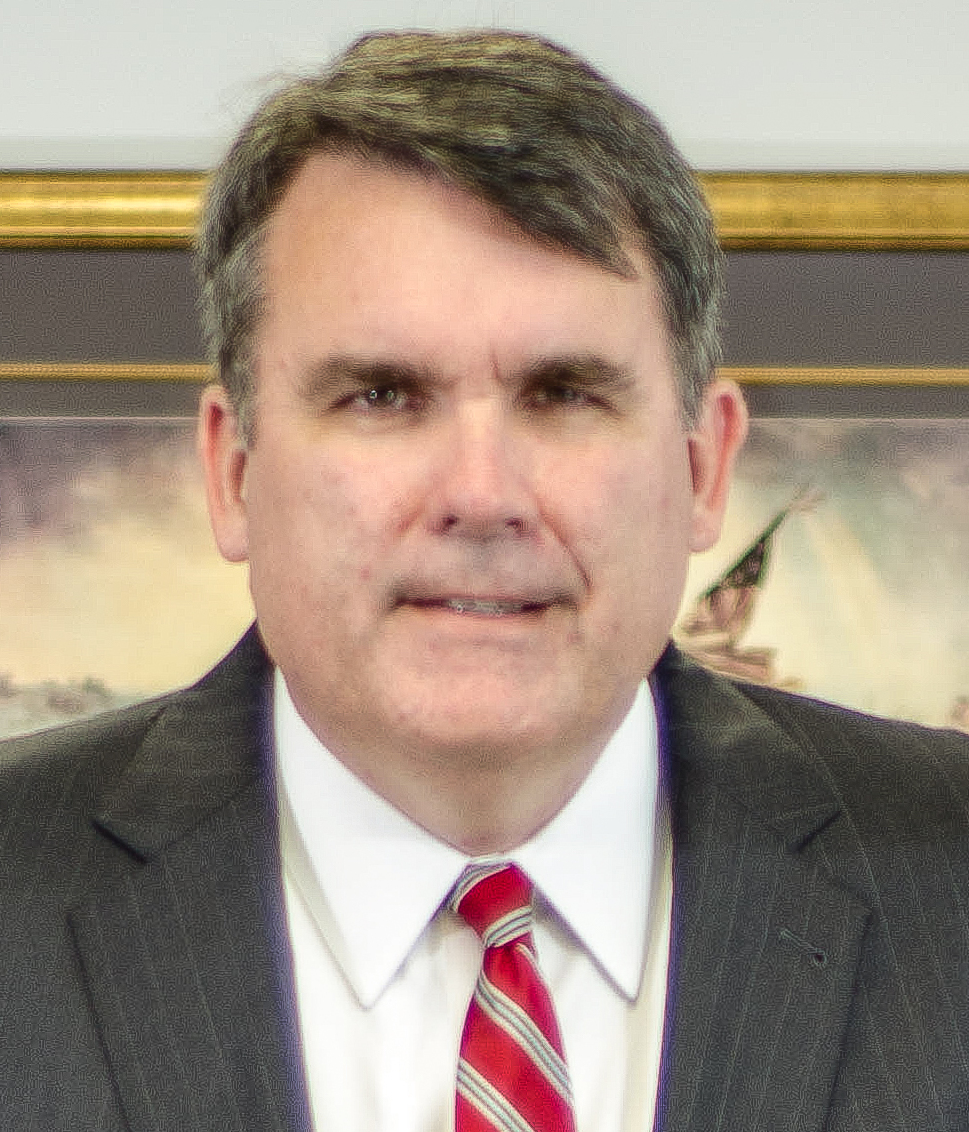

Candidate	Chuck Eaton	David Burgess
Party	Republican	Democratic
First round	941,748; 46.25%	994,619; 48.85%
Runoff	112,232; 52.18%	102,860; 47.82%
- Eaton: 40–50% 50–60% 60–70% 70–80% 80–90% Burgess: 40–50% 50–60% 60–70% 70–80% >90% Tie: 40–50% 50%
Commissioner before election
David Burgess
Democratic
Elected Commissioner
Chuck Eaton
Republican

==== General Election Results ====
2006 Public Service Commissioner District 3 election, Georgia
Party	Candidate	Votes	%
Democratic	David L. Burgess	994,619	48.8
Republican	Chuck Eaton	941,748	46.3
Libertarian	Paul MacGregor	99,747	4.9

2006 Public Service Commissioner District 3 runoff election, Georgia
Party	Candidate	Votes	%
Republican	Chuck Eaton	112,232	52.2
Democratic	David L. Burgess	102,860	47.8

==== Primary election results ====
Republicans

Georgia Republican July Primary, 2006
Candidate	Votes	%
Chuck Eaton	182,469	58.6
Mark Parkman	128,669	41.4

Democrats

- David Burgess

Libertarians

- Paul MacGregor

=== District 5 ===
This is a statewide race.

==== General Election Results ====
2006 Public Service Commissioner District 5 election, Georgia
Party	Candidate	Votes	%
Republican	Stan Wise	1,122,173	55.0
Democratic	Dawn Randolph	823,681	40.4
Libertarian	Kevin Cherry	95,247	4.7

==== Primary results ====
Republicans

Georgia Republican July Primary, 2006
Candidate	Votes	%
Stan Wise	233,617	68.8
Newt Nickell	105,929	31.2

Democrats

- Dawn Randolph

Libertarians

- Kevin Cherry

== Judicial elections ==
In 2006, four seats on the Supreme Court of Georgia and four on the Georgia Court of Appeals were up for election. All judicial elections in Georgia are officially non-partisan.

=== Supreme Court of Georgia elections ===
Incumbent state Supreme Court Associate Justices George H. Carley, Harold Melton, Hugh P. Thompson, and Carol W. Hunstein were all re-elected with three being unopposed. Only Hunstein received any opposition, which she overcame handily.

==== Supreme Court (Hunstein seat) election ====
Supreme Court of Georgia election, 2006
Party	Candidate	Votes	%	±%
Nonpartisan	Carol W. Hunstein	1,170,973	63.1%	
Nonpartisan	Mike Wiggins	683,483	36.9%	
Turnout		1,854,456	100	

=== Georgia Court of Appeals elections ===
Incumbent Judges John Ellington, M. Yvette Miller, Herbert E. Phipps, and J.D. Smith were re-elected without opposition.
