= 2018 Georgia state elections =

2018 Georgia elections
- November 6, 2018; December 4, 2018

A general election was held in the U.S. state of Georgia on November 6, 2018. All of Georgia's executive officers were up for election, as well as all of Georgia's fourteen seats in the United States House of Representatives. Neither U.S. Senate seat was up for election in 2018. Early voting for the general election was held from October 15 to 26. The primary for all offices was held on May 22, 2018, with early voting being held April 30 to May 18.

The Republican Party won every statewide office in 2018.

== Governor ==
Incumbent Republican governor Nathan Deal was term-limited and unable to seek re-election to a third consecutive term.

Secretary of State Brian Kemp won the Republican nomination, defeating incumbent Republican lieutenant governor Casey Cagle in a runoff election. Georgia General Assembly Minority Leader Stacey Abrams won the Democratic nomination. Ted Metz ran for the Libertarian Party. Kemp beat Abrams following a very divisive campaign.

== Lieutenant governor ==
Potential Republican candidates included Georgia Senate President Pro Tempore David Shafer, State Representative Geoff Duncan, Senate Majority Leader Bill Cowsert, State Senator Butch Miller, State Senator Burt Jones, Secretary of State Brian Kemp, Public Service Commissioner Tim Echols and former adjutant general of the Georgia National Guard Jim Butterworth. State Representative Allen Peake was also speculated as a potential candidate, but ruled out a bid.

As of November 2017, the declared Democratic candidate was Sarah Riggs Amico, an auto executive. Potential Democratic candidates included 2010 Attorney General nominee, former Dougherty County District Attorney Ken Hodges.

=== Democratic primary ===
- Sarah Riggs Amico, businesswoman
- Triana Arnold James, small business owner and veteran

==== Primary results ====
Democratic primary results
Party	Candidate	Votes	%
Democratic	Sarah Riggs Amico	278,662	55.24
Democratic	Triana Arnold James	225,758	44.76
Total votes		504,420	100

=== Republican primary ===
- Geoff Duncan, state representative
- Rick Jeffares, state senator
- David Shafer, state senator

==== Primary results ====
Republican primary results
Party	Candidate	Votes	%
Republican	David Shafer	268,221	48.91
Republican	Geoff Duncan	146,163	26.65
Republican	Rick Jeffares	134,047	24.44
Total votes		548,431	100

==== Runoff results ====
Republican primary runoff results
Party	Candidate	Votes	%
Republican	Geoff Duncan	280,465	50.14
Republican	David Shafer	278,868	49.86
Total votes		559,333	100

=== General election ===
Georgia lieutenant gubernatorial election, 2018
Party	Candidate	Votes	%
Republican	Geoff Duncan	1,951,738	51.63
Democratic	Sarah Riggs Amico	1,828,566	48.37
Total votes		3,780,304	100
Republican hold			

== Attorney general ==
Incumbent Republican attorney general Sam Olens resigned to become president of Kennesaw State University effective November 1, 2016, with Georgia Department of Economic Development Commissioner Christopher M. "Chris" Carr being appointed to serve the remainder of the term. Carr would be eligible to run for election to a full term in 2018.

Potential Republican candidates included State Senator Josh McKoon and former state representative B.J. Pak.

Potential Democratic candidates included State Representative Stacey Evans and former Georgia Judicial Qualifications Commission Chair Lester Tate. 2010 nominee and former Dougherty County District Attorney Ken Hodges was considered a potential candidate, but decided to run for a seat on the Georgia Court of Appeals instead. Columbus Mayor Teresa Tomlinson ruled out running for attorney general. As of July 2018, Charlie Bailey, former Senior Assistant District Attorney in the Fulton County District Attorney's office, was running.

=== Democratic primary ===
- Charlie Bailey, former Fulton County Senior Assistant District Attorney

==== Primary results ====
Democratic primary results
Party	Candidate	Votes	%
Democratic	Charlie Bailey	456,105	100
Total votes		456,105	100

=== Republican primary ===
- Chris Carr, incumbent

==== Primary results ====
Republican primary results
Party	Candidate	Votes	%
Republican	Chris Carr (incumbent)	475,122	100
Total votes		475,122	100

=== General election ===
Governing magazine projected the race as "leans Republican".

Georgia Attorney General election, 2018
Party	Candidate	Votes	%
Republican	Chris Carr (incumbent)	1,981,563	51.30
Democratic	Charlie Bailey	1,880,807	48.70
Total votes		3,862,370	100
Republican hold			

== Secretary of state ==
Incumbent Republican secretary of state Brian Kemp ran for governor.

State Representative Buzz Brockway ran for the Republican nomination. Other potential Republican candidates included Alpharetta Mayor David Belle Isle and State Senators Steve Gooch, John Albers, and Michael Williams.

The Democratic nominee was former U.S. Representative from Georgia's 12th congressional district, John Barrow, who defeated Dee Dawkins-Haigler and Rakeim "RJ" Hadley in the primary.

The Libertarian candidate was Smythe Duval. He won the nomination at the Georgia State Libertarian Convention in February 2018.

=== Democratic primary ===
- John Barrow, former U.S. representative
- Dee Dawkins-Haigler, former state representative and candidate for the state senate in 2016
- RJ Hadley, former Rockdale County Tax Commissioner and candidate for U.S. Senate in 2010

==== Primary results ====
Democratic primary results
Party	Candidate	Votes	%
Democratic	John Barrow	264,864	51.48
Democratic	Dee Dawkins-Haigler	151,963	29.54
Democratic	RJ Hadley	97,682	18.99
Total votes		514,509	100

=== Republican primary ===
- Buzz Brockway, state representative
- David Belle Isle, mayor of Alpharetta
- Joshua McKoon, state senator
- Brad Raffensperger, state representative

==== Primary results ====
Republican primary results
Party	Candidate	Votes	%
Republican	Brad Raffensperger	185,386	34.96
Republican	David Belle Isle	151,328	28.54
Republican	Joshua McKoon	112,113	21.14
Republican	Buzz Brockway	81,492	15.37
Total votes		530,319	100

==== Runoff results ====
Republican primary runoff results
Party	Candidate	Votes	%
Republican	Brad Raffensperger	331,127	61.74
Republican	David Belle Isle	205,223	38.26
Total votes		536,350	100

=== General election ===
Georgia Secretary of State election, 2018
Party	Candidate	Votes	%
Republican	Brad Raffensperger	1,906,588	49.1
Democratic	John Barrow	1,890,310	48.7
Libertarian	Smythe DuVal	86,696	2.2
Total votes		3,883,594	100.00

==== Runoff results ====
Georgia Secretary of State runoff election, 2018
Party	Candidate	Votes	%
Republican	Brad Raffensperger	764,855	51.9
Democratic	John Barrow	709,049	48.1
Total votes		1,473,904	100.0%
Republican hold			

== Commissioner of Agriculture ==
2018 Georgia Agriculture Commissioner election
- November 6, 2018
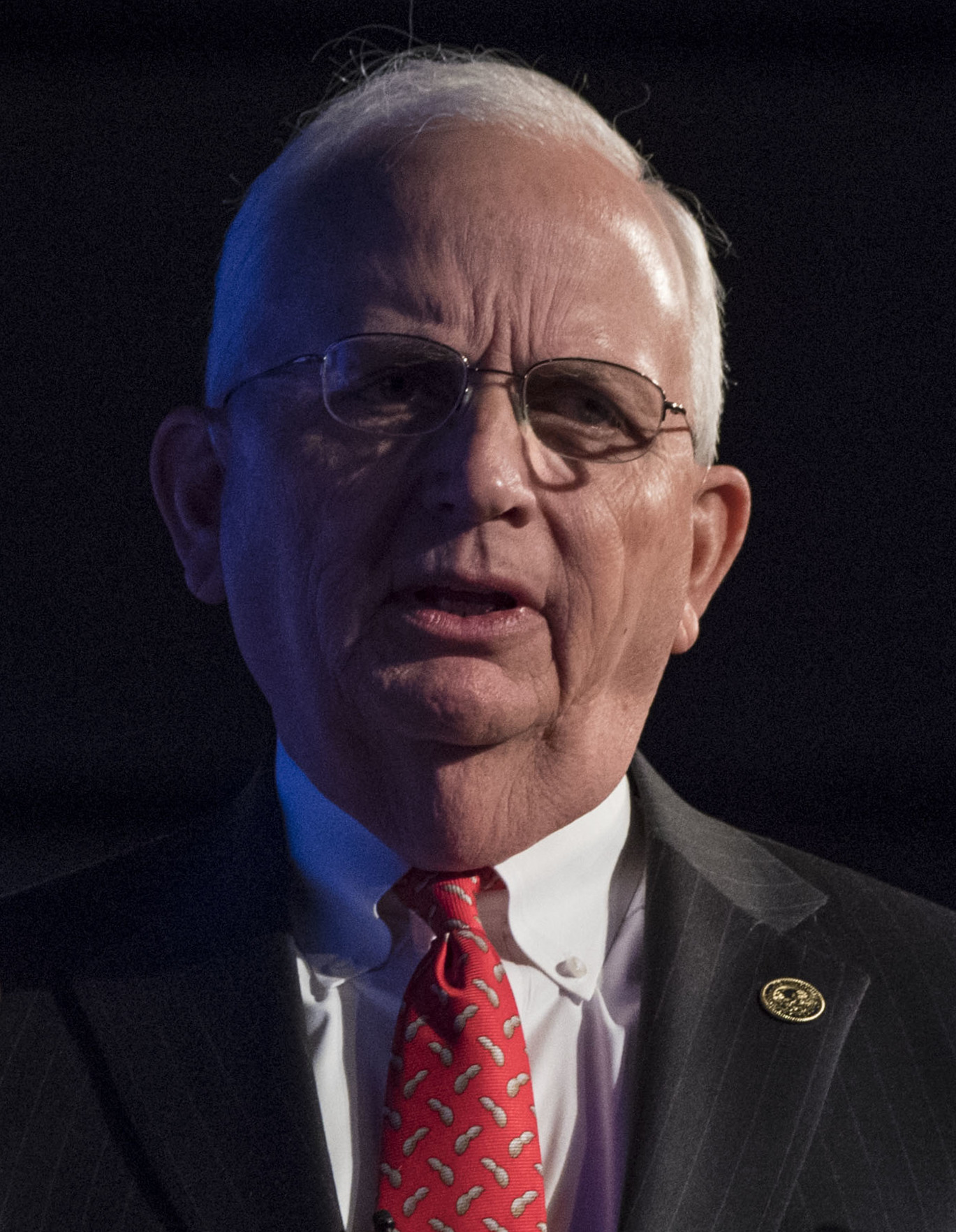

Nominee	Gary Black	Fred Swann
Party	Republican	Democratic
Popular vote	2,040,097	1,803,383
Percentage	53.08%	46.92%
- Black: 40–50% 50–60% 60–70% 70–80% 80–90% >90% Swann: 40–50% 50–60% 60–70% 70–80% 80–90%
Commissioner before election
Gary Black
Republican
Elected Commissioner
Gary Black
Republican

Incumbent Republican Commissioner of Agriculture Gary Black was eligible to run for re-election to a third term in office.

=== Democratic primary ===
- Fred Swann

==== Primary results ====
Democratic primary results
Party	Candidate	Votes	%
Democratic	Fred Swann	444,869	100
Total votes		444,869	100

=== Republican primary ===
- Gary Black, incumbent.

==== Primary results ====
Republican primary results
Party	Candidate	Votes	%
Republican	Gary Black (incumbent)	481,263	100
Total votes		481,263	100

=== General election ===
Georgia Commissioner of Agriculture election, 2018
Party	Candidate	Votes	%
Republican	Gary Black (incumbent)	2,040,097	53.08
Democratic	Fred Swann	1,803,383	46.92
Total votes		3,843,480	100
Republican hold			

== Commissioner of Insurance ==
2018 Georgia Insurance and Safety Fire Commissioner election
- November 6, 2018
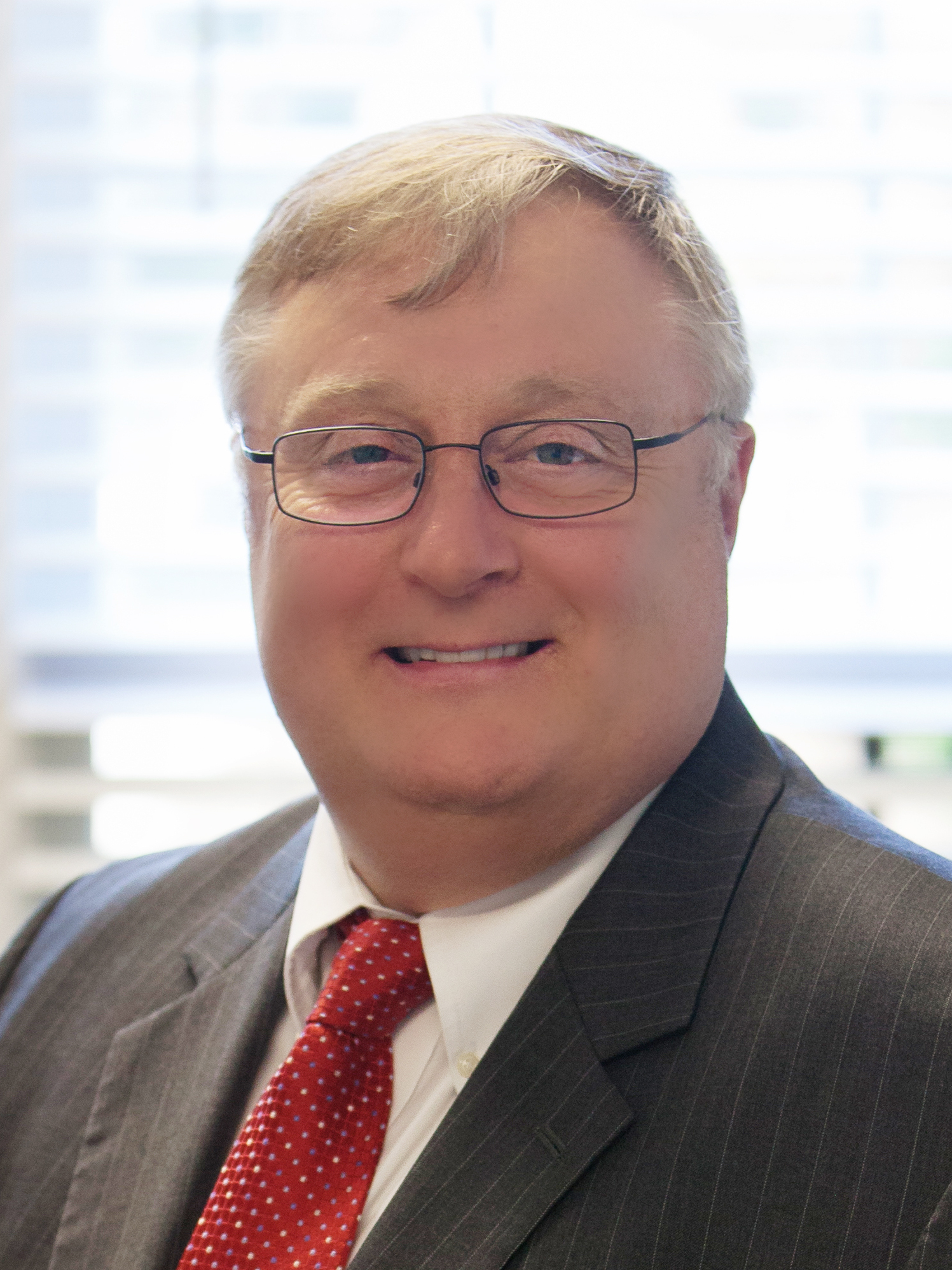

Nominee	Jim Beck	Janice Laws
Party	Republican	Democratic
Popular vote	1,944,963	1,814,499
Percentage	50.37%	46.99%
- County results Beck: 40–50% 50–60% 60–70% 70–80% 80–90% >90% Laws: 50–60% 60–70% 70–80% 80–90%
Commissioner before election
Ralph Hudgens
Republican
Elected Commissioner
Jim Beck
Republican

Incumbent Republican Commissioner of Insurance Ralph Hudgens did not run for re-election.

=== Democratic primary ===
- Janice Laws, insurance agent.
- Cindy Zeldin

==== Primary results ====
Democratic primary results
Party	Candidate	Votes	%
Democratic	Janice Laws	303,526	62.86
Democratic	Cindy Zeldin	179,335	37.14
Total votes		482,861	100

=== Republican primary ===
- Jim Beck, former Deputy Insurance Commissioner.
- Jay Florence
- Tracy Jordan

==== Primary results ====
Republican primary results
Party	Candidate	Votes	%
Republican	Jim Beck	313,852	59.69
Republican	Jay Florence	109,850	20.89
Republican	Tracy Jordan	102,108	19.42
Total votes		525,810	100

=== Libertarian nominee ===
- Donnie Foster, former deputy sheriff.

=== General election ===
Georgia Commissioner of Insurance election, 2018
Party	Candidate	Votes	%
Republican	Jim Beck	1,944,963	50.37
Democratic	Janice Laws	1,814,499	46.99
Libertarian	Donnie Foster	102,163	2.65
Total votes		3,861,625	100
Republican hold			

== Commissioner of Labor ==
2018 Georgia Commissioner of Labor election
- November 6, 2018

Nominee	Mark Butler	Richard Keatley
Party	Republican	Democratic
Popular vote	2,019,389	1,830,061
Percentage	52.46%	47.54%
- County results Butler: 50–60% 60–70% 70–80% 80–90% >90% Keatley: 50–60% 60–70% 70–80% 80–90%
Commissioner before election
Mark Butler
Republican
Elected Commissioner
Mark Butler
Republican

Incumbent Republican Commissioner of Labor Mark Butler was eligible to run for re-election to a third term in office.

=== Democratic primary ===
- Richard Keatley
- Fred Quinn

==== Primary results ====
Democratic primary results
Party	Candidate	Votes	%
Democratic	Richard Keatley	235,837	51.52
Democratic	Fred Quinn	221,959	48.48
Total votes		457,796	100

=== Republican primary ===
- Mark Butler, incumbent.

==== Primary results ====
Republican primary results
Party	Candidate	Votes	%
Republican	Mark Butler (incumbent)	478,012	100
Total votes		478,012	100

=== General election ===
Georgia Commissioner of Labor election, 2018
Party	Candidate	Votes	%
Republican	Mark Butler (incumbent)	2,019,389	52.46
Democratic	Richard Keatley	1,830,061	47.54
Total votes		3,849,450	100
Republican hold			

== State Superintendent of Schools ==
2018 Georgia State Superintendent of Schools election
- November 6, 2018
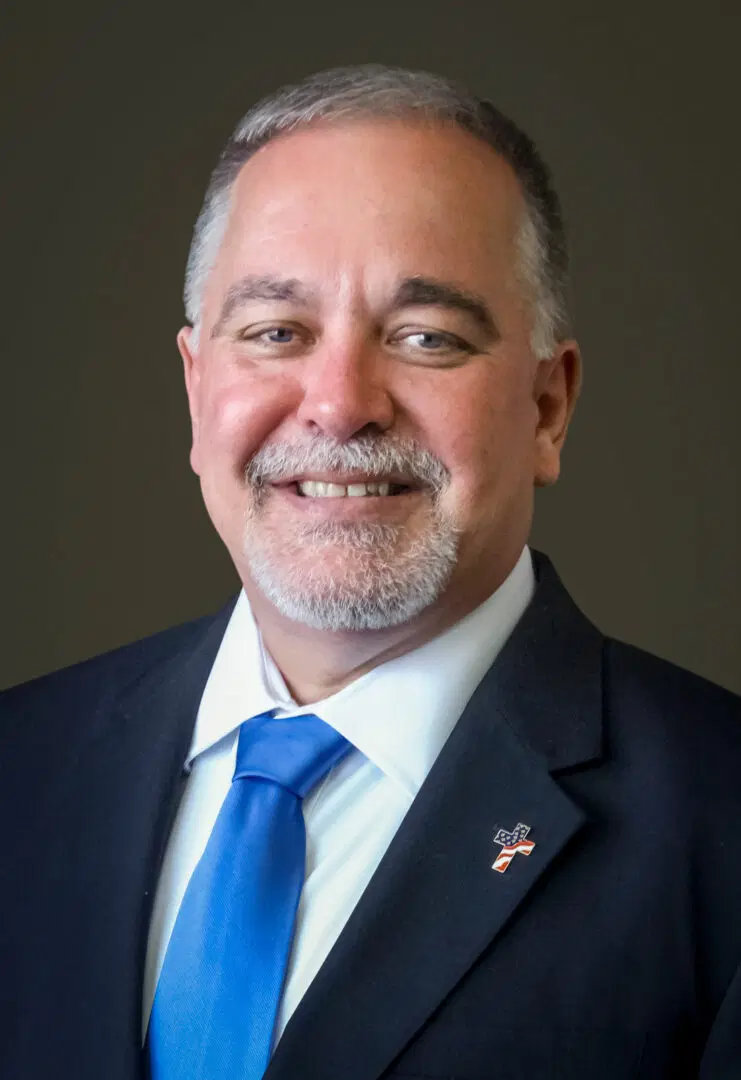

Nominee	Richard Woods	Otha E. Thornton Jr.
Party	Republican	Democratic
Popular vote	2,048,003	1,814,461
Percentage	53.02%	46.98%
- County results Woods: 50–60% 60–70% 70–80% 80–90% >90% Thornton Jr.: 50–60% 60–70% 70–80% 80–90%
Superintendent before election
Richard Woods
Republican
Elected Superintendent
Richard Woods
Republican

Incumbent Republican State Superintendent of Schools Richard Woods ran for re-election to a second term in office.

Potential Democratic candidates included Georgia Association of Educators president Sid Chapman and former National PTA President Otha Thornton.

=== Democratic primary ===
- Sid Chapman, president of the Georgia Association of Educators
- Sam Mosteller
- Otha E. Thornton Jr., former National PTA president

==== Primary results ====
Democratic primary results
Party	Candidate	Votes	%
Democratic	Otha E. Thornton Jr.	208,407	43.87
Democratic	Sid Chapman	173,270	36.47
Democratic	Sam Mosteller	93,402	19.66
Total votes		475,079	100

==== Runoff results ====
Democratic primary runoff results
Party	Candidate	Votes	%
Democratic	Otha E. Thornton Jr.	87,528	59.14
Democratic	Sid Chapman	60,480	40.86
Total votes		148,008	100

=== Republican primary ===
- John Barge, former Georgia Superintendent of Schools
- Richard Woods, incumbent

==== Primary results ====
Republican primary results
Party	Candidate	Votes	%
Republican	Richard Woods (incumbent)	324,848	60.13
Republican	John Barge	215,431	39.87
Total votes		540,279	100

=== General election ===
Georgia State Superintendent of Schools election, 2018
Party	Candidate	Votes	%
Republican	Richard Woods (incumbent)	2,048,003	53.02
Democratic	Otha E. Thornton Jr.	1,814,461	46.98
Total votes		3,862,464	100
Republican hold			

== Public Service Commission ==
Elections were held for District 3 (Metro Atlanta) and District 5 (Western Georgia) of the Georgia Public Service Commission.

=== District 3 ===
2018 Georgia Public Service Commission District 3 election
- November 6, 2018 (first round); December 4, 2018 (runoff)
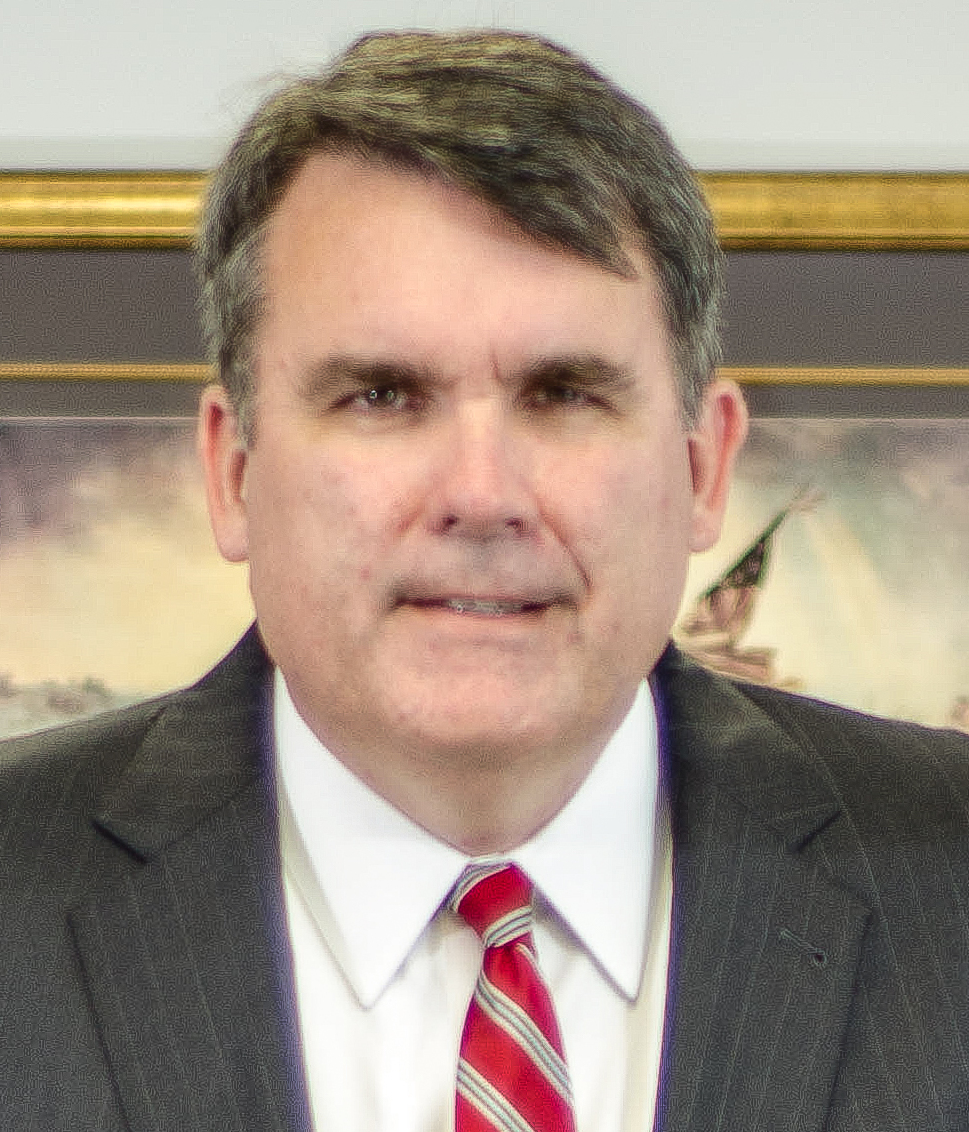

Candidate	Chuck Eaton	Lindy Miller
Party	Republican	Democratic
First round	1,917,656; 49.70%	1,838,020; 47.63%
Runoff	758,553; 51.75%	707,267; 48.25%
- Eaton: 40–50% 50–60% 60–70% 70–80% 80–90% >90% Miller: 40–50% 50–60% 60–70% 70–80% 80–90%
Commissioner before election
Chuck Eaton
Republican
Elected Commissioner
Chuck Eaton
Republican

==== Democratic primary ====
- Lindy Miller
- John Noel
- Johnny C. White

===== Results =====
Democratic primary results
Party	Candidate	Votes	%
Democratic	Lindy Miller	312,467	65.43
Democratic	John Noel	90,327	18.91
Democratic	Sam Mosteller	74,777	15.66
Total votes		477,571	100

==== Republican primary ====
- Chuck Eaton, incumbent.

===== Results =====
Republican primary results
Party	Candidate	Votes	%
Republican	Chuck Eaton (incumbent)	471,261	100
Total votes		471,261	100

==== Libertarian nominee ====
- Ryan Graham

==== General Election ====
===== First round =====
Georgia Public Service Commissioner District 3 first round, 2018
Party	Candidate	Votes	%
Republican	Chuck Eaton (incumbent)	1,917,656	49.70
Democratic	Lindy Miller	1,838,020	47.63
Libertarian	Ryan Graham	102,878	2.67
Total votes		3,858,554	100

===== Runoff =====
Georgia Public Service Commissioner District 3 runoff election, 2018
Party	Candidate	Votes	%
Republican	Chuck Eaton (incumbent)	758,553	51.75
Democratic	Lindy Miller	707,267	48.25
Total votes		1,465,820	100
Republican hold			

=== District 5 ===
2018 Georgia Public Service Commission District 5 election
- November 6, 2018

Candidate	Tricia Pridemore	Dawn A. Randolph
Party	Republican	Democratic
Popular vote	1,937,599	1,820,868
Percentage	50.25%	47.23%
- County results Pridemore: 40–50% 50–60% 60–70% 70–80% 80–90% Randolph: 50–60% 60–70% 70–80% 80–90%
Commissioner before election
Tricia Pridemore
Republican
Commissioner
Tricia Pridemore
Republican

==== Democratic primary ====
- Dawn A. Randolph
- Doug Stoner

===== Results =====
Democratic primary results
Party	Candidate	Votes	%
Democratic	Dawn A. Randolph	366,727	78.58
Democratic	Doug Stoner	99,958	21.42
Total votes		466,685	100

==== Republican primary ====
- John Hitchins III
- Tricia Pridemore, incumbent

===== Results =====
Republican primary results
Party	Candidate	Votes	%
Republican	Tricia Pridemore (incumbent)	280,099	53.04
Republican	John Hitchins III	247,980	46.96
Total votes		528,079	100

==== Libertarian nominee ====
- John Turpish

==== General Election ====
Georgia Public Service Commissioner District 5 election, 2018
Party	Candidate	Votes	%
Republican	Tricia Pridemore (incumbent)	1,937,599	50.25
Democratic	Dawn A. Randolph	1,820,868	47.23
Libertarian	John Turpish	97,203	2.52
Total votes		3,855,670	100
Republican hold			

== General Assembly ==
All 56 seats in the Georgia State Senate and 180 seats in the Georgia House of Representatives were up for election.

=== Georgia State Senate ===
Party	Before	After	Change
Republican	37	35	▼2
Democratic	19	21	▲2
Total	56	56	

=== Georgia House of Representatives ===
Party	Before	After	Change
Republican	116	105	▼11
Democratic	64	75	▲11
Total	180	180	

== United States House of Representatives ==
All of Georgia's fourteen seats in the United States House of Representatives were up for election in 2018. Democrats flipped one seat that elected a Republican in the previous election, resulting in them holding five of the state's 14 seats.

== Judicial elections ==
Five seats on the Georgia Supreme Court and seven seats on the Georgia Court of Appeals were up for statewide elections. Of these, only one was contested - the seat of Court of Appeals judge John Ellington who ran for Supreme Court following the retirement of Carol Hunstein.

Ken Hodges, the Democratic nominee for Attorney General of Georgia in 2010, defeated attorney Ken Shigley in a nonpartisan election.

=== Court of Appeals (Ellington's seat) ===
Results by county Hodges: 60–70%; 70–80%; 80–90%

2018 Georgia Court of Appeals election
Party	Candidate	Votes	%
Nonpartisan	Ken Hodges	665,875	69.95
Nonpartisan	Ken Shigley	286,093	30.05
Total votes		951,968	100

== Ballot measures ==
Seven statewide ballot measures appeared on the ballot.

2018 Georgia ballot measures
Name	Description	Votes				Type
Name	Description	Yes	%	No	%	Type
Amendment 1	Creates the Georgia Outdoor Stewardship Trust Fund to protect water quality, wildlife habitat, and parks.	3,161,607	82.89	652,560	17.11	Legislatively referred constitutional amendment
Amendment 2	Creates a state-wide business court to lower costs, enhance efficiency, and promote predictable judicial outcomes.	2,560,107	69.01	1,149,503	30.99	Legislatively referred constitutional amendment
Amendment 3	Encourages the conservation, sustainability, and longevity of Georgia's working forests through tax subclassification and grants.	2,275,659	62.18	1,384,369	37.82	Legislatively referred constitutional amendment
Amendment 4	Provides rights for victims of crime in the judicial process.	3,068,352	80.93	723,220	19.07	Legislatively referred constitutional amendment
Amendment 5	Authorizes fair allocation of sales tax proceeds to county and city school districts.	2,640,831	71.24	1,065,878	28.76	Legislatively referred constitutional amendment
Referendum A	Provides for a homestead exemption for residents of certain municipal corporations.	2,060,127	57.09	1,548,608	42.91	Legislatively referred state statute
Referendum B	Provides a tax exemption for certain homes for the mentally disabled.	2,860,293	76.93	857,809	23.07	Legislatively referred state statute
Source: Georgia Secretary of State

Results by county

Amendment 1 results by county
Yes:
- 60–70%
- 70–80%
- 80–90%

Amendment 2 results by county
Yes:
- 50–60%
- 60–70%
- 70–80%

Amendment 3 results by county
Yes:
- 50–60%
- 60–70%
No:
- 50–60%

Amendment 4 results by county
Yes:
- 60–70%
- 70–80%
- 80–90%
- >90%

Amendment 5 results by county
Yes:
- 50–60%
- 60–70%
- 70–80%
- 80–90%

Referendum A results by county
Yes:
- 50–60%
- 60–70%
No:
- 50–60%

Referendum B results by county
Yes:
- 60–70%
- 70–80%
- 80–90%

== Controversies ==
The gubernatorial race was particularly controversial during the 2018 elections, as Republican candidate Brian Kemp was also the Georgia Secretary of State, a position which involves overseeing the electoral process, leading to allegations of conflicts of interests. Despite calls from Georgia Democrats, organizations such as the NAACP and Common Cause, and former president Jimmy Carter, Kemp did not relinquish the position until after the election.

Accusations were also leveled at Kemp with regards to the purging of voter rolls that was done under his oversight. Removing names from voter rolls is a common practice in the case of voters who are deceased or have moved out of state, but since 2017, the practice had spiked in Georgia. Due to strict voting rules in Georgia, tens of thousands of citizens lost their right to vote because of otherwise trivial issues, such as small differences between pieces of identification or insufficiently similar signatures. Kemp was accused of using the voter roll purge as a tactic to disenfranchise more than half a million people, predominantly African-Americans, which has been likened to voter suppression.
