= Southern Wildlife Management =

Wildlife control and rehabilitation company based in Georgia, USA

Southern Wildlife Management is a privately held wildlife control company licensed by the Georgia Department of Natural Resources as a Wildlife Control Operator (WCO), based in Johns Creek, Georgia, United States. The company provides nuisance wildlife control services for residential and commercial properties in North Georgia.

Southern Wildlife Management also holds a wildlife rehabilitation license, which allows personnel to assist with injured or orphaned wildlife encountered during wildlife control operations.

Some of the species addressed by the company include squirrels, rats, bats, beaver, fox, coyote, snakes, bee hives, hornet nests, opossum, raccoons, woodpeckers, Canada goose and other nuisance wildlife.

== Services ==
Services described by the company include wildlife trapping and removal, wildlife exclusion work (entry-point sealing and prevention), dead animal removal, and pest management services.

== Wildlife removal regulations ==
Wildlife Control Operators (WCOs) in Georgia must follow regulations established by the Georgia Department of Natural Resources governing the trapping, relocation, and handling of wildlife.

Squirrels (including flying squirrels)

In Georgia, squirrels cannot be trapped in a manner intended to kill them (for example, snap traps designed to kill rodents). According to the Georgia Department of Natural Resources, squirrels must be released unharmed in suitable habitat.

Rats

Rats are typically treated as invasive rodents and may be controlled using legal pest control methods.

Bats

Bat exclusion work is subject to seasonal restrictions intended to protect maternity colonies (when young bats are not yet volant). Guidance on seasonal timing and permitted exclusion practices is provided by the Georgia Department of Natural Resources.

Birds

Most native bird species in the United States are protected under the Migratory Bird Treaty Act of 1918, which prohibits killing protected birds and covers many actions affecting birds, nests, and eggs without permits. Certain non-native species (such as house sparrows, European starlings, and rock pigeons) are not protected under the Act.

Honeybees

Honeybees are considered important to agriculture due to pollination. In Georgia, pesticide application and certain pest-management activities are regulated through licensing and oversight administered by the Georgia Department of Agriculture. (Editors typically request a specific statutory or agency citation for any claim that a particular method is "illegal" or that a specific certification is "required by law".)

== Training and industry standards ==
Training and best-practice guidance for wildlife control operators is published by industry organizations, including the National Wildlife Control Operators Association (NWCOA). Guidance related to humane bat exclusion and bat conservation is also published by organizations such as Bat World Sanctuary.

== Media coverage ==
Southern Wildlife Management has been referenced in regional news coverage concerning nuisance wildlife issues in the Atlanta metropolitan area.

In 2015, CBS 46 (now Atlanta News First) reported on a debate regarding raccoon trapping regulations in Georgia in a segment titled North vs. South: Raccoon traps debated in Georgia. The report included a demonstration of trapping equipment by licensed trapper Richard Federation of Southern Wildlife Management.

In 2017, FOX 5 Atlanta reported on coyote sightings in Cobb County and included comments from a licensed trapper with Southern Wildlife Management discussing wildlife behavior and safety concerns.

== See also ==
- Wildlife control operator
- Pest control
- Urban wildlife conflict
- Bat conservation
