= Senator Brush =

Senator Brush may refer to:

- George W. Brush (1842–1927), New York State Senate
- Henry Brush (1778–1855), Ohio State Senate
- Jared L. Brush (1835–1913), Colorado State Senate
- Joey Brush (1955–2015), Georgia State Senate
