= Phil Campbell (politician) =

American pilot, farmer, government official, and politician from Georgia

Undersecretary of the United States Department of Agriculture
- In office 1969–1975

Georgia Commissioner of Agriculture
- In office 1955–1969

Member of the Georgia General Assembly from Oconee County
- In office 1949–1954

Personal details
- Born: April 9, 1917 Athens, Georgia, U.S.
- Died: June 22, 1998 (aged 81)
- Party: Republican (after 1968); Democratic (until 1968)
- Education: University of Georgia

Military service
- Allegiance: United States
- Branch/service: United States Army Air Forces
- Rank: First lieutenant
- Battles/wars: World War II

James Philander Campbell Jr. (April 9, 1917 – June 22, 1998) was an American pilot, farmer, government official, and politician from Georgia.

Campbell was born in Athens, Georgia and graduated from Athens High School in 1934. He received his bachelor's degree in agriculture from the University of Georgia.

== Career ==
Campbell served in the United States Army Air Forces during World War II. He was a pilot and bombardier and was commissioned a first lieutenant in the United States Army. After the war, Campbell owned a farm in Oconee County, Georgia. Campbell served in the Georgia House of Representatives from 1949 to 1954 and was a Democrat. He then served as Georgia Commissioner of Agriculture from 1955 to 1969. In 1968, Campbell switched to the Republican Party. Campbell served as Under Secretary in the United States Department of Agriculture from 1969 to 1975 during the Nixon and Ford Administrations. He then worked for Gold Kist as a consultant.

Party political offices
Preceded by Tom Linder	Democratic nominee for Agriculture Commissioner of Georgia; 1954, 1958, 1962, 1966	Succeeded by Tommy Irvin
