= Greg Hecht =

American politician

Greg Hecht is an American politician, a member of the Democratic Party, and a former member of the Georgia General Assembly in the U.S. state of Georgia. Hecht unsuccessfully sought the Democratic nomination for lieutenant governor of Georgia in 2006. Hecht was the Democratic nominee for Attorney General of Georgia in 2014.

== Biography ==
Hecht was born in Columbus, Georgia and graduated from the University of North Carolina at Chapel Hill in 1985 and earned a J.D. at the University of Georgia School of Law in 1988. Hecht is a former resident of Lake Spivey near Jonesboro, Georgia.

== Career ==
As a member of the Georgia State Senate, Hecht was named Legislator of the Year by the Georgia Council on Aging for his work in authoring and passing elder abuse prevention laws. He has continued to work in this area as the present Chairman of the Alzheimer's Services Center, where he has served as a board member for fifteen years.

During his career in the general assembly, Hecht was honored with the "Speak Up For a Child" award as well as an environmental leadership award for his work to improve education in the state and protect the environment.

== Campaign for lieutenant governor ==
Hecht ran against Jim Martin for the Democratic nomination for the office. Although there were two Republican candidates in the race, Hecht focused his campaign on the presumed Republican frontrunner, Ralph Reed; Reed, however, was defeated in the Republican primary. In the Democratic primary, Hecht finished second to Martin by a margin of 37 percent to 42 percent and was defeated by Martin in the ensuing runoff election, 38 percent to 62 percent.

Georgia House of Representatives
Preceded by Gail Johnson	Member of the Georgia House of Representatives from the 97th district 1997–1999	Succeeded by Mike Barnes
Georgia State Senate
Preceded by Pam Glanton	Member of the Georgia State Senate from the 34th district 1999–2003	Succeeded by Valencia Seay
Party political offices
Preceded by Ken Hodges	Democratic nominee for Attorney General of Georgia; 2014	Succeeded by Charlie Bailey
