= Georganna Sinkfield =

American politician

Member of the Georgia House of Representatives from the 60th district
- In office January 10, 2005 – January 10, 2011
- Preceded by: J. Max Davis Jr.
- Succeeded by: Gloria Bromell Tinubu

Member of the Georgia House of Representatives from the 50th district
- In office January 13, 2003 – January 10, 2005
- Preceded by: Lanett Stanley-Turner
- Succeeded by: Mark Burkhalter

Member of the Georgia House of Representatives from the 57th district
- In office January 11, 1993 – January 13, 2003
- Succeeded by: Karla Drenner

Member of the Georgia House of Representatives from the 37th district
- In office January 10, 1983 – January 11, 1993
- Preceded by: David Scott
- Succeeded by: Mitchell Kaye

Personal details
- Born: February 11, 1943 (age 83) Florence County, South Carolina
- Party: Democratic

Georganna Sinkfield (born February 11, 1943) is an American politician who served in the Georgia House of Representatives from 1983 to 2011.

Party political offices
Preceded by Gail Buckner	Democratic nominee for Secretary of State of Georgia; 2010	Succeeded by Doreen Carter
