= Thurbert Baker =

American politician (born 1952)

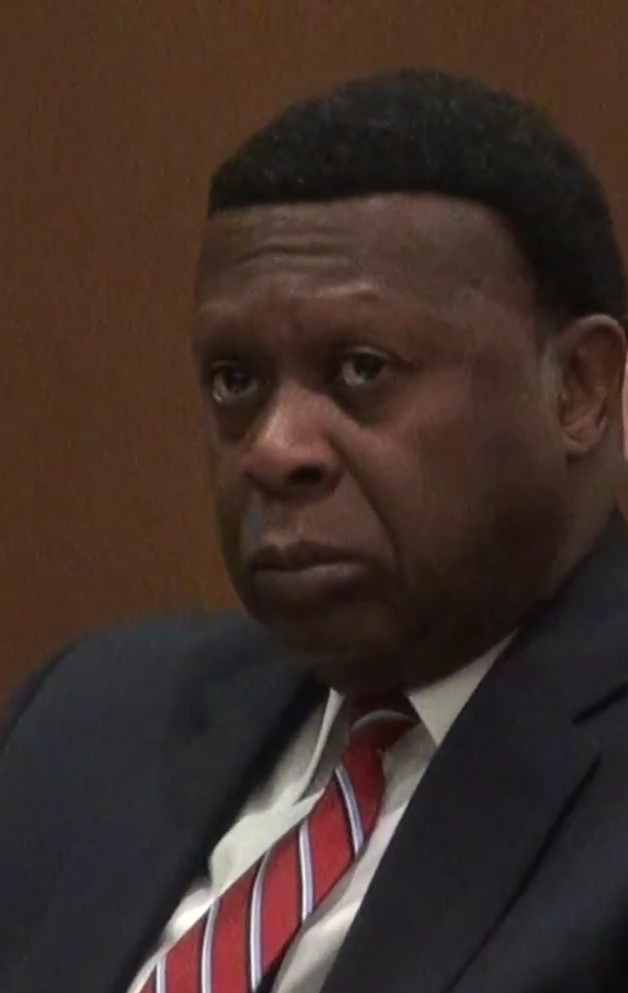
- Baker in 2018

46th Attorney General of Georgia
- In office June 1, 1997 – January 10, 2011
- Governor: Zell Miller; Roy Barnes; Sonny Perdue
- Preceded by: Mike Bowers
- Succeeded by: Sam Olens

Member of the Georgia House of Representatives from the 70th district
- In office January 11, 1993 – June 1, 1997
- Preceded by: John T. Simpson
- Succeeded by: Stan Watson

Member of the Georgia House of Representatives from the 51st district
- In office January 9, 1989 – January 11, 1993
- Preceded by: Ken Workman
- Succeeded by: Billy McKinney

Personal details
- Born: Thurbert Earl Baker; December 16, 1952 (age 73) Rocky Mount, North Carolina, U.S.
- Party: Democratic
- Spouse: Catherine Baker
- Education: University of North Carolina, Chapel Hill (BA); Emory University (JD)

Thurbert Earl Baker (born December 16, 1952) served as the first African American Attorney General of the U.S. state of Georgia. He was appointed to the position in 1997 by Governor Zell Miller and served until January 10, 2011.

Governor Zell Miller installed Thurbert Baker (at the time his chief lieutenant in the Georgia House of Representatives) as attorney general on June 1, 1997, making him the first African-American to hold that job in Georgia and the only black state attorney general in the country at the time. Baker was subsequently elected to the position three times as a Democrat. In the 2006 general election, Baker received more votes—and a higher percentage of the vote—than any other Democrat running statewide in Georgia, being one of three Democrats to win statewide that year (the other two being Agriculture Commissioner Tommy Irvin and Labor Commissioner Michael Thurmond). These three would remain the last Democrats to win statewide in Georgia until 2020, when Joe Biden narrowly carried the state in his successful presidential bid. Baker served the fourth-longest tenure as Attorney General in state history (behind Eugene Cook, Arthur K. Bolton and Michael J. Bowers).

== Legislature ==
Baker served in the Georgia House of Representatives from 1989 to 1997. From 1993, until his appointment as Attorney General, he was the Miller Administration's House Floor Leader. During his legislative tenure, Baker sponsored several significant legislative initiatives. Chief among those were the HOPE Scholarship and the "Two Strikes and You're Out" law, designed to put the worst repeat violent felons in prison for life without parole.

== Attorney General ==
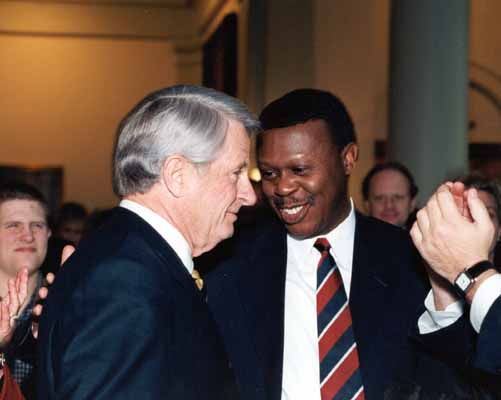
Baker with Zell Miller

Baker served as the President of the National Association of Attorneys General from 2006 to 2007. As Attorney General, Baker focused on initiatives to fight crime and fraud, including stronger laws against sexual predators who use the Internet to target children, laws against financial identity theft, and stronger laws against residential mortgage fraud. He also advocated for the abolition of parole for persons convicted of violent crimes, which the Georgia General Assembly did not enact.

In 2003, Baker and Governor Sonny Perdue clashed in court, with both claiming the right to control the state's legal affairs. The controversy involved gerrymandering, and arose when Perdue ordered Baker to drop an appeal of a case involving a legal challenge to a legislative redistricting map drawn by the Democratic legislative majority and signed into law by Perdue's Democratic predecessor, Roy Barnes. When Baker refused to drop the appeal, Perdue sued him. The Supreme Court of Georgia ultimately sided with Baker, ruling 5-2 that the Attorney General, as an elected constitutional officer, is independent of the Governor and has the power to control the state government's legal affairs.

In 2010, Perdue and Baker clashed again when Perdue asked Baker to sue the federal government over the passage of the federal Patient Protection and Affordable Care Act ("Obama Care"). Baker declined, arguing that he saw no legal basis for the suit, believed it would ultimately fail, and decrying it as "frivolous" and a "waste of taxpayer money". In response, Perdue appointed a "special" Attorney General for that purpose. Some Republican state lawmakers subsequently introduced legislation to impeach Baker for his refusal.

== 2010 gubernatorial campaign ==
In 2010, Baker ran for governor. He was defeated in the Democratic primary by former governor Roy Barnes. Barnes was defeated in the general election, later that year, in a Republican sweep of statewide offices.

== Personal ==
Baker was born in Rocky Mount, North Carolina in 1952. He grew up with Mike Easley, the former Governor of North Carolina and former Attorney General of North Carolina, Roy Cooper, another former Attorney General of North Carolina and former Governor of North Carolina, and Gregory O. Griffin, the current Chief Legal Counsel for the Alabama Board of Pardons and Paroles. While attending the University of North Carolina, Baker was on the fencing team, and won the 1975 Atlantic Coast Conference (ACC) individual sabre championship. In 2002, the ACC recognized him as one of the best fencers in its history, naming him to its 50th anniversary fencing team. Baker moved to Georgia in the 1970s to practice law.

Baker and his wife, Catherine, an educator, reside in the Atlanta suburb of Stone Mountain. They have two daughters. He is a practicing Baptist and a member of Omega Psi Phi fraternity.

== Education ==
- J.D., Emory University School of Law, 1979
- Bachelor of Arts, University of North Carolina at Chapel Hill, 1975

Party political offices
Preceded by Wesley Dunn	Democratic nominee for Attorney General of Georgia; 1998, 2002, 2006	Succeeded by Ken Hodges
Legal offices
Preceded by Mike Bowers	Attorney General of Georgia; 1997–2011	Succeeded by Sam Olens
