= Georgia Department of Agriculture =

State department of agriculture in the U.S. state of Georgia

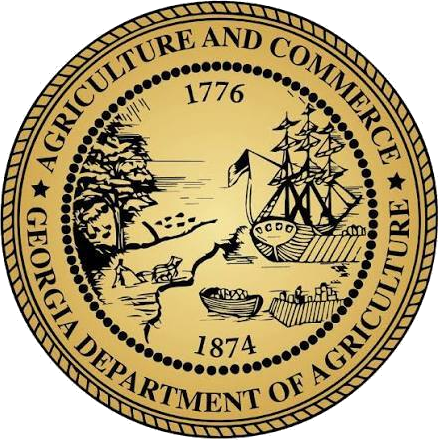

State department of agriculture overview
- Formed: February 28, 1874; 152 years ago
- Jurisdiction: Georgia
- Headquarters: 19 Martin Luther King Jr. Drive SW; Atlanta, Georgia 30334
- Employees: 550+ (2024)
- State department of agriculture executive: Tyler Harper, Commissioner of Agriculture
- Parent State department of agriculture: None; an independently elected constitutional office
- Website: agr.georgia.gov

The Georgia Department of Agriculture (GDA) is a state government agency of Georgia responsible for regulating food, fiber, animals, and the agricultural workforce in the state, and for promoting Georgia's agricultural industry. Established in 1874, it is the oldest state department of agriculture in the United States. The department is headed by an elected Commissioner of Agriculture, currently Tyler Harper, and is headquartered in Atlanta.

== History ==
The Georgia Department of Agriculture was created by the Georgia General Assembly on February 28, 1874, to assist the state's agricultural industry, which had struggled in the years following the American Civil War. Governor James M. Smith endorsed the bill creating the department, which passed the Georgia House of Representatives only after Speaker Augustus O. Bacon cast a tie-breaking vote. Physician Thomas P. Janes was appointed as the first Commissioner of Agriculture, serving from 1874 to 1879. The office became an elected position in 1890, when R. T. Nesbitt defeated incumbent J. T. Henderson.

Unlike most Georgia executive agencies, which operate under the authority of the governor, the Department of Agriculture is headed by an independently elected commissioner who serves a four-year term. Tommy Irvin, commissioner from 1969 to 2011, was the longest-serving statewide elected official in Georgia history.

In 2024, the department marked its 150th anniversary with a series of public events, including a celebration at the Georgia State Capitol.

== Organization and functions ==
As of 2024, the department had more than 550 employees across more than 20 divisions, including Animal Industry, Food Safety, Fuel and Measures, Agricultural Inputs, Plant Protection, Law Enforcement and Emergency Management, Laboratory, Licensing, Legal, Policy, Communications, Grants, Human Resources, Information Technology, and Georgia Grown, the department's marketing arm.

The department regulates and inspects grocery stores, food warehouses, bottling and food processing plants, gasoline quality and pump calibration, weights and measures, pesticides, structural pest control, meat processing plants, seed quality, fertilizer, animal feed, and pet dealers and breeders, among other areas. It also markets Georgia agricultural products domestically and internationally through its Georgia Grown program. Since 1917, the department has published The Farmers and Consumers Market Bulletin, a newspaper distributed in print and online editions.

Georgia is among the nation's leading producers of poultry, pecans, peanuts, eggs, and rye, and is the second-largest cotton-producing state; the Vidalia onion, grown in South Georgia, is also regulated by the department.

== List of commissioners ==
The following is a list of Georgia Commissioners of Agriculture:

| # | Name | Term of Service | Political Party |
|---|---|---|---|
| 1 | Thomas P. Janes | 1874–1879 | Democratic |
| 2 | J. T. Henderson | 1879–1890 | Democratic |
| 3 | Robert Taylor Nesbitt | 1890–1898 | Democratic |
| 4 | O. B. Stevens | 1899–1905 | Democratic |
| 5 | Thomas G. Hudson | 1905–1912 | Democratic |
| 6 | James J. Conner | 1912 | Democratic |
| 7 | James D. Price | 1913–1917 | Democratic |
| 8 | J. J. Brown | 1917–1927 | Democratic |
| 9 | Eugene Talmadge | 1927–1933 | Democratic |
| 10 | G. C. Adams | 1933–1935 | Democratic |
| 11 | Tom Linder | 1935–1937 | Democratic |
| 12 | Columbus Roberts | 1937–1941 | Democratic |
| 13 | Tom Linder | 1941–1955 | Democratic |
| 14 | Phil Campbell | 1955–1969 | Democratic (1955–1968) / Republican (1968–1969) |
| 15 | Tommy Irvin | 1969–2011 | Democratic |
| 16 | Gary Black | 2011–2023 | Republican |
| 17 | Tyler Harper | 2023–present | Republican |
