= Rob Teilhet =

American politician

Robert Brandon Teilhet is an American Democratic politician who served as a member of the Georgia House of Representatives from 2003 to 2011. He represented District 40, which encompassed parts of southeastern Cobb County.

Teilhet graduated from the University of Georgia (UGA) with a Bachelor of Arts (A.B.) degree in 1996 and a Juris Doctor (J.D.) from the UGA School of Law in 2000.

A member of the Georgia House of Representatives in Georgia, following a record of service in the Georgia House of Representatives, Teilhet was a 2010 candidate for Attorney General of the State of Georgia but lost the Democratic primary to Ken Hodges.
