= 2010 Georgia lieutenant gubernatorial election =

- November 2, 2010
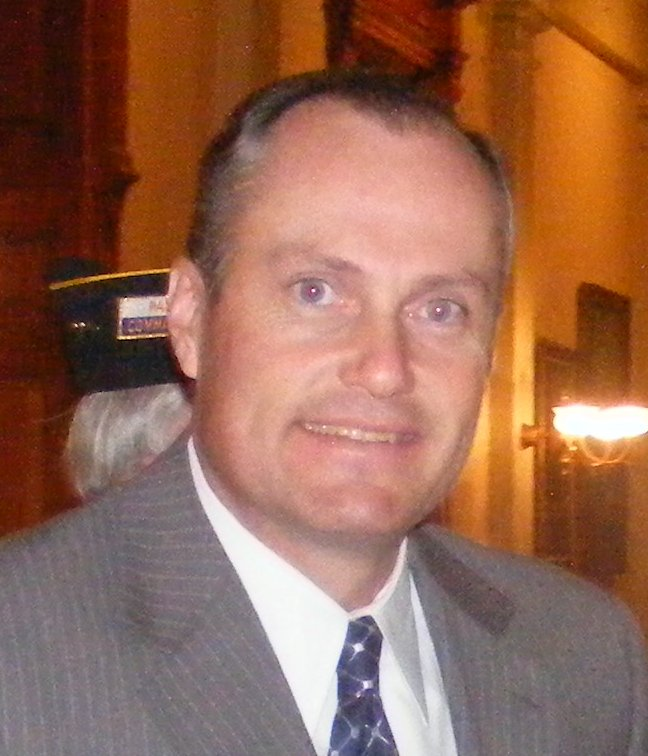

Nominee	Casey Cagle	Carol Porter
Party	Republican	Democratic
Popular vote	1,403,977	1,074,624
Percentage	54.69%	41.86%
- County results Cagle: 50–60% 60–70% 70–80% 80–90% Porter: 40–50% 50–60% 60–70% 70–80%
Lieutenant Governor before election
Casey Cagle
Republican
Elected Lieutenant Governor
Casey Cagle
Republican

The 2010 Georgia lieutenant gubernatorial election was held on November 2, 2010, in order to elect the lieutenant governor of Georgia. Republican nominee and incumbent lieutenant governor Casey Cagle defeated Democratic nominee Carol Porter and Libertarian nominee Dan Barber.

== Democratic primary ==
The Democratic primary election was held on July 20, 2010. Candidate Carol Porter received a majority of the votes (69.67%), and was thus elected as the nominee for the general election.

=== Results ===
2010 Democratic lieutenant gubernatorial primary
Party	Candidate	Votes	%
Democratic	Carol Porter	228,245	69.67%
Democratic	Tricia Carpenter McCracken	99,373	30.33%
Total votes		327,618	100.00%

== Republican primary ==
The Republican primary election was held on July 20, 2010. Incumbent lieutenant governor Casey Cagle ran unopposed and was thus elected as the nominee for the general election.

=== Results ===
2010 Republican lieutenant gubernatorial primary
Party	Candidate	Votes	%
Republican	Casey Cagle (incumbent)	525,287	56.05%
Total votes		525,287	100.00%

== General election ==
On election day, November 2, 2010, Republican nominee Casey Cagle won re-election by a margin of 329,353 votes against his foremost opponent Democratic nominee Carol Porter, thereby retaining Republican control over the office of lieutenant governor. Cagle was sworn in for his second term on January 10, 2011.

=== Results ===
Georgia lieutenant gubernatorial election, 2010
Party	Candidate	Votes	%
Republican	Casey Cagle (incumbent)	1,403,977	54.69
Democratic	Carol Porter	1,074,624	41.86
Libertarian	Dan Barber	88,746	3.45
Total votes		2,567,347	100.00
Republican hold			
