= Joey Brush =

American businessman and politician

Member of the Georgia Senate from the 24th district

State Representative
- In office 1992–1993

State Representative
- In office 1995–1996

State Senator
- In office 1997–2004

Personal details
- Born: December 5, 1955 Tucker, Georgia, United States
- Died: May 7, 2015 (aged 59) Augusta, Georgia, United States
- Party: Republican

Ben Joseph Brush Jr. (December 5, 1955 – May 7, 2015) was an American businessman and politician.

Born in Tucker, Georgia, Brush graduated from Southern Polytechnic State University and was a real estate broker and home builder. Brush served in the Georgia House of Representatives, as a Republican, from 1992 to 1993 and from 1995 to 1996. From 1997 until 2004 he served in the Georgia State Senate including time as the Chairman of Senate Education Committee. On May 7, 2015, Brush was killed in an automobile accident in Columbia County, Georgia, when his motorcycle collided with a car whose driver pulled out in front of him.
