= Gail Buckner =

American politician (born 1950)

Gail McAndrew Buckner (born September 5, 1950) is an American politician who served as a Democratic member of the Georgia State Senate, representing its 44th District from 2009 to 2011. She previously served in the Georgia State Assembly, representative of District 76, encompassing parts of Clayton County from 1990 to 2006. Buckner represented District 76. Buckner was a candidate for Secretary of State of Georgia in 2006, but lost to Republican Karen Handel.

== Early life ==
Buckner was born in Cocke County, Tennessee, the daughter of Inman and Betty Louise McAndrew. She married Charles Michael Buckner in 1967, received her bachelor of science degree from Clayton State University in Education, and later attended Georgia State University for her communications major. She has three children who were educated in the public schools of the Clayton County School System.

== Organizations ==
- President of the Public Relations Student Society of America (PRSSA)
- President of the National Federation of Democratic Women
- Graduated from the National Foundation for Women Legislators' Leadership College.

Party political offices
Preceded by Cathy Cox	Democratic nominee for Secretary of State of Georgia; 2006	Succeeded by Georganna Sinkfield
