= Ken Hodges =

American politician

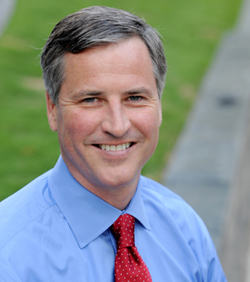

Judge of the Georgia Court of Appeals
- Incumbent
- Assumed office January 1, 2019
- Preceded by: John J. Ellington

District Attorney Dougherty County, Georgia
- In office January 7, 1996 – October 1, 2008

Personal details
- Born: Kenneth Bryant Hodges, III; September 22, 1965 (age 61) Albany, Georgia, U.S.
- Spouse: Melissa Hodges
- Education: Emory University (BA); University of Georgia (JD)
- Occupation: Lawyer
- Website: Ken Hodges for Georgia Court of Appeals

Kenneth (Ken) B. Hodges III (born September 22, 1965) is a judge of the Georgia Court of Appeals. He also served as Dougherty County District Attorney and later ran as the Democratic nominee for Attorney General of Georgia in 2010. In 2015, Hodges started his own law firm, Ken Hodges Law, based out of Atlanta and Albany. In 2018, he won an open seat in a contested race on the Georgia Court of Appeals, earning nearly 70% of the statewide vote.

Hodges was born and raised in Albany, Georgia and went on to receive his Bachelor of Arts degrees in political science and sociology from Emory University in 1988 and his Juris Doctor degree from the University of Georgia School of Law in 1991. His wife, Melissa, grew up in Gwinnett County, graduated from The Marist School in Atlanta, and earned her bachelor's degree from Saint Mary's College, Notre Dame, Indiana. A former television journalist, she is now a media consultant. The couple was married in 2004 and currently live in Albany, Georgia, with their daughter and son.

== Career ==
After graduating from law school at the University of Georgia, Hodges worked at an Atlanta law firm before returning to his hometown of Albany, Georgia, in 1996 to run a successful campaign for Dougherty County District Attorney. Hodges served as District Attorney for 12 years, gaining re-election in 2000 and 2004.

During his career as lawyer and prosecutor, Hodges has argued in front of the Georgia Court of Appeals and the Georgia Supreme Court. Hodges was instrumental in the 2002 prosecution of Sidney Dorsey, a former DeKalb County Sheriff who ordered the assassination of his successor, Derwin Brown. Ultimately, Dorsey was found guilty on eleven counts, including murder and racketeering, and was sentenced to a term of life without parole.

Ken Hodges also served as President of the Georgia District Attorney's Association and in 2002 was recognized as Georgia's District Attorney of the Year. He has also chaired the Prosecuting Attorney's Council (PAC), and is a Fellow of the Lawyer's Foundation of Georgia.

He is a graduate of Leadership Albany and Leadership Georgia, and was on the board of trustees for Leadership Georgia. He has been listed on Georgia Trend Magazine's "40 under 40" and the Fulton County Daily Report's "Attorneys on the Rise."

Ken Hodges is past Secretary and Board of Trustees member for the Urban League of Atlanta.

In August 2009, as candidate for Georgia Attorney General, Hodges received the endorsement of Andrew Young, former Mayor of Atlanta and United States Ambassador to the United Nations under President Jimmy Carter. Young praised Hodges for "his commitment to equal rights and the fair application of justice during his years of service in Albany." Hodges has also received the endorsements of former Georgia Supreme Court Chief Justice Leah Ward Sears, the first African-American female Chief Justice in the United States, Mark Taylor, former lieutenant governor of Georgia, and Sam Nunn, former United States Senator from Georgia.

In the Democratic primary, Hodges defeated state Representative Rob Teilhet In spite of these endorsements, Hodges lost the 2010 general election to Cobb County Commissioner Sam Olens.

In January 2011, Hodges joined the Atlanta law firm Rafuse Hill & Hodges, LLP as a partner in the litigation division. Rafuse Hill & Hodges had a national litigation practice focusing on employment, civil rights, product liability, and commercial disputes.

In 2013, Hodges was honored by the State Bar of Georgia's Committee to Promote Inclusion in the Profession with the Commitment to Equality Award. Hodges was selected for the honor because of "his contributions to the advancement of diversity, including his prior service as District Attorney for the Dougherty Judicial Circuit, hiring as his chief assistant the African American prosecutor who later became his successor. During his three terms, Hodges had one of the most proportionately diverse offices in the state and, in many instances, helped his minority assistants move on to become federal prosecutors or secure positions in private practice. As district attorney, he maintained an internship program with Albany State University, one of Georgia's historical black universities."

In 2013, Hodges was elected by Georgia's attorneys to serve on the executive committee of the State Bar of Georgia. Hodges currently serves on the board of governors for the State Bar of Georgia, and multiple committees, including the Advisory Committee on Legislation. He was sworn in as President of the State Bar of Georgia in June 2018.

In 2013, Hodges was elected by Georgia's attorneys to serve on the executive committee of the State Bar of Georgia. Hodges currently serves on the board of governors for the State Bar of Georgia, and multiple committees, including the Advisory Committee on Legislation. He was sworn in as president of the State Bar of Georgia in June 2018.

As district attorney, he requested a search of a physician's phone records, against the physician—who questioned certain billing practices at the local hospital Phoebe Putney. Hodges was personally sued, successfully, in the same district court in Albany, but because the case finally impinged on "absolute immunity for grand jurors", the district court decision went all the way to the Supreme Court of the United States, where it was then overturned.

Party political offices
Preceded by Thurbert Baker	Democratic nominee for Attorney General of Georgia; 2010	Succeeded by Greg Hecht
