= Gary Black (politician) =

American politician (born 1958)

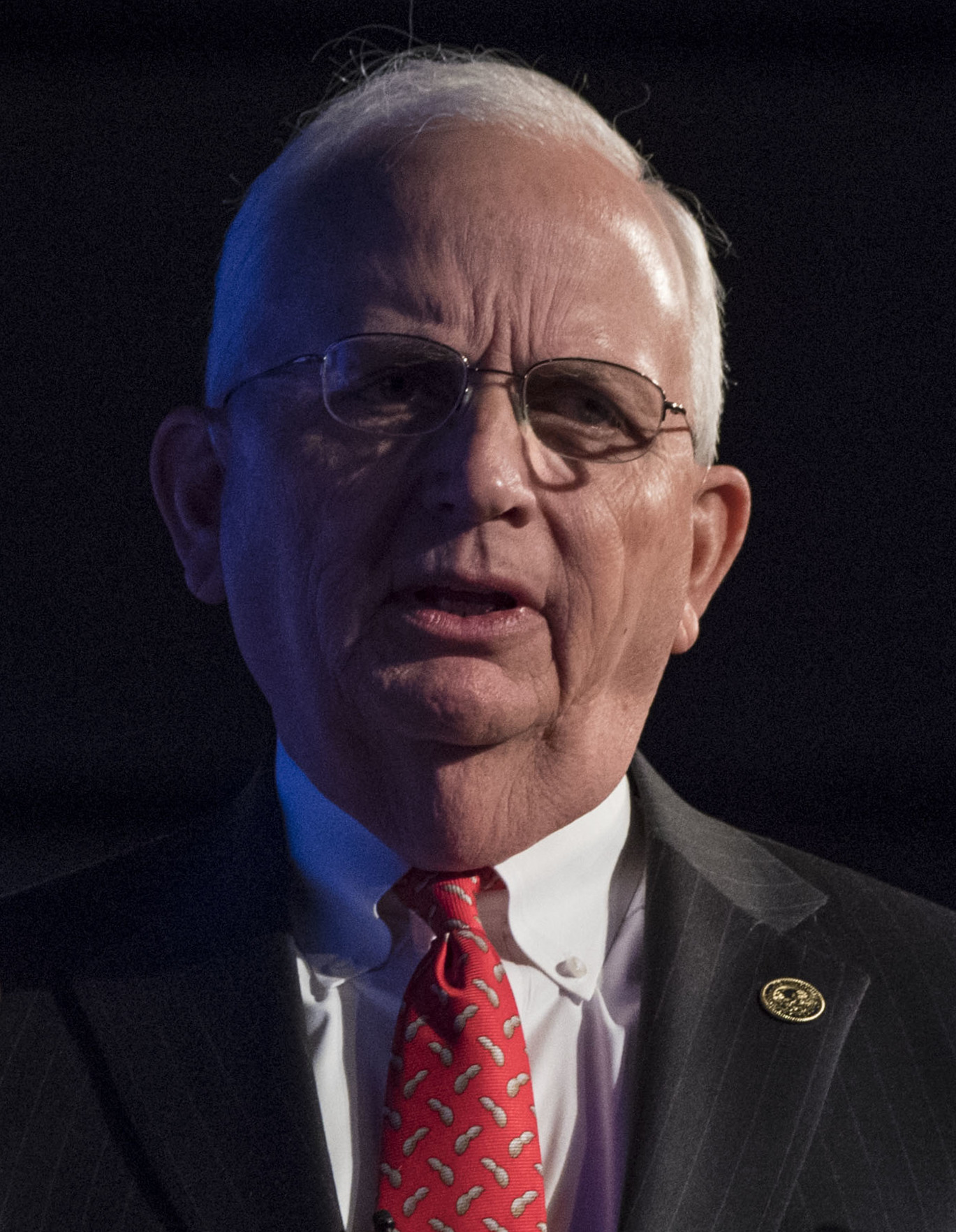
- Black at George Washington University, 2017

Agriculture Commissioner of Georgia
- In office January 10, 2011 – January 12, 2023
- Governor: Nathan Deal; Brian Kemp
- Preceded by: Tommy Irvin
- Succeeded by: Tyler Harper

Personal details
- Born: Gary Ward Black; August 20, 1958 (age 67) Atlanta, Georgia, U.S.
- Party: Republican
- Spouse: Lydia Beavers
- Children: 2
- Education: University of Georgia (BS)

Gary Ward Black (born August 20, 1958) is an American farmer and politician from the U.S. state of Georgia. A Republican, he previously served as Agriculture Commissioner of Georgia from 2011 to 2023, having been first elected in 2010. He was a candidate for the Republican nomination for U.S. Senate in Georgia in 2022.

== Agricultural career ==
Black received a Bachelor of Science in agricultural education from the University of Georgia. He spent 40 years in the farm business and is a cattle farmer in Jackson County, specifically in Commerce. Until his 2010 campaign for agriculture commissioner, Black's primary job was president and lobbyist for the Georgia Agribusiness Council, a position to which he was elected in 1989 and held for 21 years. He had previously held positions at the Georgia Farm Bureau.

== Political career ==
=== Agriculture Commissioner of Georgia ===
Black was the Republican nominee for agriculture commissioner in 2006, but was defeated by Democrat Tommy Irvin, a 37-year incumbent. In 2004 and 2008, he had positions on the Bush-Cheney and McCain-Palin campaigns.

In 2010, Irvin decided not to seek election to an eleventh term as agriculture commissioner, and Black was elected to the open seat. Black was twice reelected agriculture commissioner by large margins. Upon taking office, Black ordered the removal of a part of a 1956 mural by George Beattie from the lobby of the Georgia Department of Agriculture building; the removed murals included idealized images of plantation slaves in Georgia harvesting sugarcane, picking cotton, and using a cotton gin. Black said at the time that he shared others' views that the images were distasteful, and that he wanted to depict a better picture of agriculture in the state.

After Hurricane Michael hit South Georgia, Black was a leading voice pushing for federal relief. Black opposed Obama-era EPA environmental protection regulations, such as proposed rules on pesticides and the Clean Water Rule (also called the Waters of the United States rule), which Black called "wretched" (the rule was ultimately revoked by the Trump administration).

Black is a supporter of Donald Trump. In 2016, Black endorsed then-candidate Trump, who appointed Black to his agriculture policy advisory council. At the time, Black criticized federal power, especially agricultural regulations.

After Trump was defeated in his 2020 bid for re-election, Black supported Republican efforts to restrict voting rights in Georgia.

=== U.S. Senate campaign ===
In June 2021, Black announced his candidacy for the Republican nomination for the United States Senate in 2022 to challenge incumbent Democrat Raphael Warnock. In announcing his Senate run, Black said he intended to rely on his name recognition from prior statewide elections, strong base of rural support, and staunch Trump support. He praised Trump for "all the good things he's done the past four years" and dodged questions about whether he accepted that Joe Biden was legitimately elected president. Many of Black's largest campaign contributors were from Georgia agribusiness. About one-third of Georgia's sheriffs, mostly from less populous rural counties, endorsed Black for Senate. During his campaign, Black took conservative stances and opposed the bipartisan $1.2 trillion infrastructure bill. Donald Trump endorsed another candidate, Herschel Walker, in the Republican primary.

=== Electoral history ===
2010 Georgia Commissioner of Agriculture Republican primary election
Party	Candidate	Votes	%
Republican	Gary Black	425,001	76.0
Republican	Darwin Carter	134,022	24.0

2010 Georgia Commissioner of Agriculture election
Party	Candidate	Votes	%
Republican	Gary Black	1,426,746	56.05
Democratic	J.B. Powell	1,027,373	40.36
Libertarian	Kevin Cherry	91,447	3.6

2014 Georgia Commissioner of Agriculture election
Party	Candidate	Votes	%
Republican	Gary Black (incumbent)	1,462,039	58.26
Democratic	Christopher Irvin	1,047,339	41.74

2018 Georgia Commissioner of Agriculture election
Party	Candidate	Votes	%
Republican	Gary Black (incumbent)	2,040,097	53.08
Democratic	Fred Swann	1,803,383	46.92

2022 U.S. Senate Republican primary election in Georgia
Party	Candidate	Votes	%
Republican	Herschel Walker	803,560	68.18
Republican	Gary Black	157,370	13.35
Republican	Latham Saddler	104,471	8.86
Republican	Josh Clark	46,693	3.96
Republican	Kelvin King	37,930	3.22
Republican	Jonathan McColumn	28,601	2.43
Total votes		1,178,625	100.0

== Personal life ==
He is married to Lydia Black and they have two children.

Party political offices
Preceded by Deana "Dee" Strickland	Republican nominee for Agriculture Commissioner of Georgia; 2006, 2010, 2014, 2018	Succeeded by Tyler Harper
Political offices
Preceded by Tommy Irvin	Agriculture Commissioner of Georgia; 2011–2023	Succeeded by Tyler Harper
