= Tommy Irvin =

American politician (1929–2017)

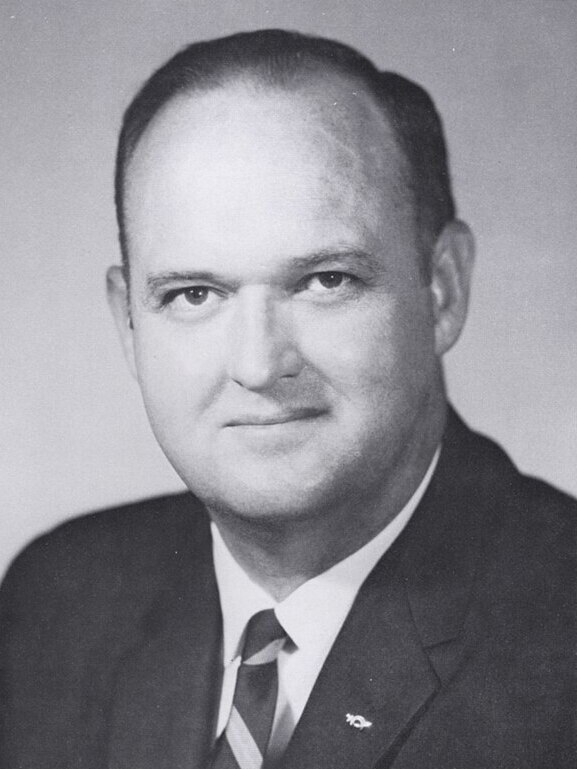
- Official portrait, circa 1970s

Georgia Commissioner of Agriculture
- In office January 13, 1969 – January 10, 2011
- Governor: Lester Maddox; Jimmy Carter; George Busbee; Joe Frank Harris; Zell Miller; Roy Barnes; Sonny Perdue
- Preceded by: Phil Campbell
- Succeeded by: Gary Black

Member of the Habersham County Board of Education
- In office 1956–1958

Member of the Georgia General Assembly
- In office 1958–1966

Executive Secretary to the Governor of Georgia
- In office 1967–1969

Personal details
- Born: Thomas Telford Irvin; July 14, 1929 Lula, Georgia, U.S.
- Died: September 14, 2017 (aged 88) Mount Airy, Georgia, U.S.
- Party: Democratic
- Spouse: Bernice Frady
- Children: 5

Thomas Telford Irvin (July 14, 1929 – September 14, 2017) was an American politician who served as Georgia's Commissioner of Agriculture from 1969 until January 2011. Irvin holds a record as the longest-serving Commissioner of Agriculture in the United States, and the longest-serving statewide official in Georgia. He was also one of the last Democrats to win statewide in Georgia until 2020, when Joe Biden won the presidential election.

== Political career ==
Irvin was born on July 14, 1929. A Hall County, Georgia, native, Irvin was elected to his first public office as a member of the Habersham County Board of Education in 1956. A Democrat, Irvin was elected to four terms in the Georgia General Assembly as a Representative from Habersham County, where he served on the House Agriculture, Education, and Appropriations Committees and chaired the House Industrial Relations Committee and the Governor's Conference on Education. During this period he sponsored legislation to allow public funding of school lunch programs. He was the Governor's Floor Leader and later served as Executive Secretary to the Governor.

He was a delegate to the 2000, 2004, and 2008 Democratic National Conventions.

In 2000, Irvin made his first trip to Cuba, representing Georgia agriculture in support of free trade with the country.

He was elected to his 10th and final four-year term in November 2006. Rather than run for another term he retired, citing his age and Parkinson's disease as reasons for the decision.

In 1998, a portion of Georgia Highway 365 was named Tommy Irvin Parkway in his honor.

== Controversy ==
Irvin's final term was not without controversy. Both Irvin and the Department of Agriculture were sued for permitting the inhumane killing of dogs and cats. In 1990, Georgia's "Humane Euthanasia Act" became one of the first laws in the nation to mandate intravenous injection of sodium pentobarbital as the prescribed method for euthanizing cats and dogs in Georgia animal shelters. Prior to that time, gas chambers and other means were commonly employed. Irvin's department was tasked with licensing the shelters and enforcing the new law, through the Department's Animal Protection Division. However, Commissioner Irvin insisted the issue was a local one, and did not abide by the terms of the law. In March 2007, the Georgia Department of Agriculture and Commissioner Irvin were sued by former State Representative Chesley V. Morton, who had sponsored the law. The Fulton County Superior Court ruled in favor of the Plaintiffs, validating the terms of the Humane Euthanasia Act, and issued a permanent injunction prohibiting the Department from issuing licenses to shelters using gas chambers, with exceptions being made for those established before the act and those in counties with less than 25,000 residents. After the Court decision, and issuance of the permanent injunction, Irvin continued to voice resistance to the ruling. In an interview with a south Georgia newspaper, Irvin suggested possible ways to circumvent the law, including the use of private contractors to operate gas chambers. When the Department continued to license a gas chamber in Cobb County, Georgia, in violation of the court order, a second action was brought, which resulted in the Department being held in contempt. The cases received widespread coverage in the media, casting Irvin in an unfavorable light.

== Personal life ==
Irvin grew up the child of poor sharecroppers. When his father died, Irvin quit school to take care of his mother and sisters, running the business for several years until he got into local politics.

Irvin was inducted into the 4-H Hall of Fame in 2007, and he and his wife funded scholarships for youth.

He was a trustee at several schools, including Piedmont College and Truett-McConnell College. Irvin also served as school board chairman and president of the Georgia School Boards Association. He died at his home in Mount Airy, Georgia, on September 14, 2017, at the age of 88.

== See also ==
- List of people from Georgia (U.S. state)

Party political offices
Preceded by Phil Campbell	Democratic nominee for Agriculture Commissioner of Georgia; 1970, 1974, 1978, 1982, 1986, 1990, 1994, 1998, 2002, 2006	Succeeded by J. B. Powell
Preceded by Phil Campbell	Georgia Commissioner of Agriculture; 1969-2011	Succeeded by Gary Black
