= Sam Olens =

Former Georgia Attorney General and University President

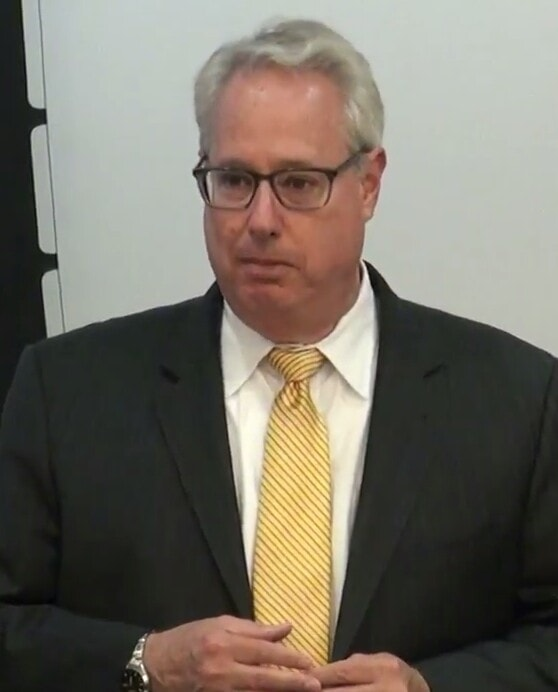
- Olens in 2017

4th President of Kennesaw State University
- In office November 1, 2016 – February 15, 2018
- Preceded by: Daniel S. Papp; Houston Davis (acting)
- Succeeded by: Pamela S. Whitten

47th Attorney General of Georgia
- In office January 10, 2011 – November 1, 2016
- Governor: Nathan Deal
- Preceded by: Thurbert Baker
- Succeeded by: Chris Carr

Personal details
- Born: Samuel Scott Olens; July 8, 1957 (age 69) Miami, Florida, US
- Party: Republican
- Spouse: Lisa Olens
- Children: 2
- Education: American University (BA); Emory University (JD)

Samuel Scott Olens (born July 8, 1957) is an American lawyer and politician who served as Attorney General of Georgia. Olens was elected Georgia AG in 2010, resigning on November 1, 2016 (two years prior to the end of his term), following his appointment as President of Kennesaw State University. He subsequently resigned as KSU's president on February 15, 2018 and then served as counsel for Dentons global law firm. He was named partner Dentons' Public Policy practice in 2021.

Prior to his election as Attorney General, Olens served as chairman of the Cobb County, Georgia Commission from 1998 through 2010. He defeated former district attorney Ken Hodges in the 2010 state elections for Attorney General, becoming the first Jew to win a statewide, partisan race in Georgia. Following Olens's resignation announcement, Christopher M. Carr was appointed as his successor by Governor Nathan Deal.

== Early life and education ==
Olens was born in Miami, Florida, and raised in New Jersey. He earned a Bachelor of Arts degree from American University and Juris Doctor from the Emory University School of Law in 1983.

== Career ==
=== Politics ===
He was elected to the Cobb County Commission in 1998, serving until 2010. He was the commission's chairman from 2002 to 2010. Since 2004, he has served as the chair of the Atlanta Regional Commission. In 2009, he stepped down from that position.

Olens defeated state senator Preston Smith to win the Republican nomination for attorney general. In the general election, he defeated former Dougherty County District Attorney Ken Hodges.

Olens joined forces with legislators to advocate for a stronger human trafficking law in Georgia. HB 200 went into effect on July 1, 2011.

Olens worked alongside legislators to pass a re-write of Georgia's Open Meetings and Open Records Laws. HB 397 was the result in the 2012 legislative session, and was signed by Gov. Nathan Deal on April 17, 2012.

Olens delivered a primetime address on national healthcare reform and federal regulatory overreach to the Republican National Convention in Tampa on August 29, 2012.

=== President of Kennesaw State ===
In mid-September 2016, sources close to the University System of Georgia (USG) leaked information that Olens might be on a short list to appointment as president of Kennesaw State University, in Kennesaw, Georgia. The university's previous president, Dr. Daniel S. Papp, retired on May 10, 2016, and the University System of Georgia's Chief Academic Officer Dr. Houston Davis was appointed as acting president pending a replacement. Many university staff and student groups objected to the potential appointment, citing Olens's lack of university experience, previous support of Georgia's controversial attempt to ban same-sex marriage, the lack of a national search, and the lack of accountability and transparency in the process through which Sam Olens was chosen. This resulted in multiple campus protests, petitions, and letters from staff to the University System of Georgia administrators.

On October 3, 2016, Hank Huckaby, the Chancellor of the University System of Georgia, sent an open letter to all faculty and students of Kennesaw State University with a confirmation that Olens was indeed being considered for the role of president. On October 4, 2016, Olens participated in an "open interview" before a USG open session of the Board of Regents’ Executive and Compensation Committee, at which time he formally requested the job. Later that afternoon, the USG Chancellor once again notified the Kennesaw State University of the status of Olens's request via email, minutes before a protest, to ask that the university community keep an open mind. Included in the email was a letter from Olens to the Board, in which Olens specifically cited his previous experience as Cobb County Commissioner and his ties to the community. The Board voted on the matter on October 12, 2016, and Olens became Kennesaw State's fourth president under a unanimous vote. His tenure officially began on November 1, 2016.

A formal complaint was filed to the Equal Employment Opportunity Commission by several faculty members who believe that discrimination was evident in Olen's appointment, as three women applied to the position but were apparently not considered.

On December 14, 2017, Olens announced his resignation after bowing to behind-the-scenes pressure from conservative Georgia politicians and mishandling protests by cheerleaders.

== Electoral history ==
Georgia Attorney General Republican Primary Election, 2010
Party	Candidate	Votes	%
Republican	Sam Olens	229,769	39.9
Republican	Preston Smith	176,656	30.6
Republican	Max Wood	170,067	29.5

Georgia Attorney General Election, 2010
Party	Candidate	Votes	%
Republican	Sam Olens	1,351,090	52.9
Democratic	Ken Hodges	1,112,049	43.6
Libertarian	Don Smart	88,583	3.5

Georgia Attorney General Election, 2014
Party	Candidate	Votes	%
Republican	Sam Olens (inc.)	1,436,987	56.93
Democratic	Gregory "Greg" Hecht	1,087,268	43.07

== See also ==
- List of Jewish American jurists

Party political offices
Preceded by Perry McGuire	Republican nominee for Attorney General of Georgia; 2010, 2014	Succeeded by Christopher M. Carr
Political offices
Preceded by Thurbert Baker	47th Attorney General of Georgia; 2011–2016	Succeeded by Christopher M. Carr
Academic offices
Preceded by Daniel S. Papp; Houston Davis (acting)	4th President of Kennesaw State University; 2016–2018	Succeeded by Ken Harmon (acting); Pamela S. Whitten
