= 2026 inauguration of Georgia (U.S. state) constitutional officers =

Wikimedia list article

The inauguration of state constitutional officers of Georgia is set to take place on January 11, 2027, in Atlanta, Georgia. The following candidates, who were elected in the 2026 Georgia state elections, will take office:

- Keisha Lance Bottoms as the 84th Governor
- Josh McLaurin as the 14th Lieutenant Governor
- Penny Brown Reynolds as the 30th Secretary of State
- Tanya Miller as the 49th Attorney General
- Lydia Powell as the 22nd Superintendent of Schools
- Nikki Porcher as the 13th Labor Commissioner
- Keisha Waites as the 19th Insurance Commissioner
- Katherine Juhan-Arnold as the 18th Agriculture Commissioner
- Peter Hubbard (re-elected) and Shelia Edwards as members of the Georgia Public Service Commission

Bottoms, Miller, Waites and Juhan-Arnold will become the first women to serve in their roles, with Porcher being the first woman elected to her role. Additionally, Bottoms, Powell, Waites and Juhan-Arnold will become the first African-Americans to serve in their roles, with Reynolds being the first African-American person to be elected to her role.

== List of transition teams ==
=== Keisha Lance Bottoms ===
Bottoms announced the co-chairs of her transition team on November 6:

- Arthur M. Blank, chairman, AMB Group and co-founder, The Home Depot
- Rosalind Brewer, former Interim President, Spelman College and CEO of Walgreens Boots Alliance
- Hon. Jason Carter, former Georgia State Senator and chair of the board of trustees at The Carter Center
- Carmen Chubb, President, Columbia Residential and former Chief of Staff to Mayor Bottoms
- Richard Cox Jr., Senior Vice President, Customer Service, Delta Air Lines and former Chief Operating Officer, City of Atlanta
- Hon. Jane Kidd, former State Representative and former chair, Democratic Party of Georgia
- Michelle Nunn, Georgia Civic Non-profit Leader
- Vicki R. Palmer, President, The Palmer Group LLC
- Hon. Rashad Taylor, former State Representative and former Senior Advisor to Mayor Bottoms
- Tyler Perry, Founder, Tyler Perry Studios

During the same press conference, she announced the honorary co-chairs:

- Thurbert Baker, former Georgia Attorney General
- Roy Barnes, 80th Governor of Georgia
- The Honorable David Burgess, former chair, Georgia Public Service Commission
- The Honorable Terry Coleman, former Speaker, Georgia House of Representatives
- The Honorable Cathy Cox, former Secretary of State and President, Georgia College & State University
- Senator Wyche Fowler, former U.S. Senator and Ambassador to Saudi Arabia
- Governor Joe Frank Harris, 78th Governor of Georgia
- The Honorable Pierre Howard, former Lieutenant Governor of Georgia
- The Honorable Peter Hubbard, Commissioner, Georgia Public Service Commission
- The Honorable Carolyn Hugley, Georgia House Minority Leader
- The Honorable Alicia Monique Johnson, Commissioner, Georgia Public Service Commission
- The Honorable Harold Jones II, Georgia Senate Minority Leader
- Senator Sam Nunn, former U.S. Senator representing Georgia
- Senator Jon Ossoff, U.S. Senator representing Georgia
- Tim Ryles, former Insurance Commissioner
- The Honorable Calvin Smyre, former Georgia State Representative
- The Honorable Mark Taylor, former Lieutenant Governor of Georgia
- The Honorable Michael Thurmond, former Labor Commissioner and DeKalb County CEO
- Senator Raphael Warnock, U.S. Senator representing Georgia
- Ambassador Andrew Young, former U.N. Ambassador and Mayor of Atlanta

Bottoms announced her transition committee on November 17:

- Bishop O.C. Allen
- Darrell Anderson
- State Rep. Michelle Au
- Aaron Barker
- Lawrence Bell
- John Bey
- Kimberly A. Blackwell
- Cornelius Blanding
- Rev. Anthony Maurice Booker
- Atlanta City Council Member Andrea L. Boone
- Robert A. Boyd II
- Dr. Jamal Bryant
- Dr. Karri Bryant
- Kandi Burruss
- Daniel Castan
- John A. Chandler
- James Clements
- Ralph Cook Jr.
- Cobb County Commission Chair Lisa Cupid
- Dr. Stephen Dawkins
- Dr. Roderick Edmond
- Burrell Ellis, former DeKalb Co. CEO
- Steven Ewing
- Dolan Falconer
- Michelle Falconer
- Gloria Frazier, former State Rep.
- Rasheeda Frost
- Sharon Gay
- Athens-Clarke County Mayor Kelly Girtz
- Rev. Dr. Charles E. Goodman Jr.
- Toni Goosby
- J. Craig Gordon, fmr. State Rep.
- Meghan Gordon
- Ernest Greer
- Rebecca Halioua
- Dr. Lakeysha Hallmon
- Larry Hanson
- Clifford Harris
- BG(ret) Shawn A. Harris
- Isaac Hayes III
- Randy Hazelton
- Dr. Clarence Hixon
- Wayne Huston
- Eulen Jang
- Cyrus Jackson
- Dr. Romona Jackson Jones, Douglas County Commission Chair
- Eugene Johnson
- Forrest Johnson
- Savannah Mayor Van Johnson
- Dr. Jana Johnson-Davis, former Decatur School Board Member
- Milton Jones
- T.J. Kaplan
- Augusta Mayor-Elect Steven Kendrick
- Kristen Kiefer
- Dr. Heavenly Kimes
- Kenny Leon
- Dr. Kimberly Manning
- David Moskowitz
- Fulton County Commissioner Rohit Malhotra
- Santiago Marquez
- Atlanta City Council Member Wayne Martin
- Keith Mason
- Statesboro Mayor Jonathan McCollar
- Griffin City Commissioner Rodney McCord
- Munir Meghjani
- Bibb County School Board Member Amy Morton
- Paul Mosley
- Tracey Mosley
- South Georgia DA Joe Mulholland
- Rod Mullice
- Rev. Dr. Kevin Murriel
- Bishop William Murphy III
- William G. Murray
- Vincent Olsziewski
- Pastor T. Lynn Oliver
- Dr. Fahamu Pecou
- Dr. Allan Pickens
- Dr. Audra Pittman
- Denise Quarles
- Wade Rakes
- Simon Ramsey
- Michael Render
- Hinesville Mayor Karl Riles
- Joy Rohadfox
- Clark Seydel
- AFCRA Exec. Dir. Kerry Stewart
- DOT Commissioner Doug Stoner
- Nikki Randall Stroud, fmr. State Rep.
- Beth Tanis
- Dwight Thomas
- Pastor Eric Thomas
- Nadine Thomas, fmr. State Senator
- Alisha Thomas Searcy, fmr. State Rep.
- Bob Trammell, fmr. House Democratic Leader
- Paula Wallace
- William K. Whitner
- Phillana Williams
- Sandra Lee Williams
- Fulton County DA Fani Willis
- Ryan Wilson
- State Rep. Al Williams

=== Penny Brown Reynolds ===
On November 19, Reynol announced her transition team:

- Raphael Warnock
- Jon Ossoff
- Roy Barnes | Chair
- Andrew Young | Co-chair
- Cathy Cox | Co-chair | President, Georgia College & State University (former Georgia Secretary of State 1999–2007)
- Michael Russell | Co-chair | CEO, H.J. Russell & Company
- Bobby Kahn | Co-chair | Former Chief of Staff, Governor Roy Barnes
- Jan Prisby Bryson | Co-chair | Founder, BenchMark Management
- Steve Leeds | Co-chair | Former Acting Administrator, U.S. General Services Administration; Transition Advisor for Agency Operations
- Meredith Lilly, Esq. | Senior Advisor, Transition Team
- Aaron Watson, Esq. | Attorney
- Dr. Alieka Anderson – Henry | Chair, Clayton County Board of Commissioners
- Ali Katoot | CEO MK Industries, LLC
- Allen Haywood | Mayor of Sparta, Georgia
- Amy Phuong | SVP, Government Relations, Atlanta Hawks
- Andrea Young, Esq. | Attorney & Retired Executive Director, ACLU of GA
- Andre Dickens | Mayor of Atlanta
- Andre Smith | Dealer Principal, Bella Auto Group
- Anita Howard, Esq. | District Attorney, Macon Judicial Circuit
- Pastor Anthony A. Motley | Lindsay Street Baptist Church
- Byron Amos | Atlanta City Council Member
- Camille Russell Love | Senior Advisor to Mayor Andre Dickens
- Carlotta Harrell | Chairwoman, Henry County Board of Commissioners
- Carmalitha Gumbs | Mayor Carmalitha Gumbs, South Fulton
- Carmen Davis | Principal, SIVAD Management Enterprise Group Consulting
- Carol D. McElheney | Vice President of Operations Hudson by Avolta
- Catherine Rowell | Ph.D., Councilwoman - District 1, South Fulton, GA
- Charles “Champ” Walker Jr | CEO, FotM Global Inc.
- Chuck Stiles | Teamsters Representative
- Constance Barkley-Lewis | SmartWork Strategy Partners
- Craig Owens | Cobb County Sheriff
- Crystal Epps | Spelman Student
- David Moskowitz, Esq. | Attorney
- David Ross, Esq. | Retired Attorney
- David Worley, Esq. | Attorney and Former Member of State Election Board
- Dawn Samad | CEO, Chiro Time Clinics; President-Elect, Georgia Chiropractic Association
- Donald (Don) Hackney, Esq. | Retired Partner, Arnall Golden Gregory
- Donzella James | Georgia State Representative
- Rev. Dr. Eugene Dale Beverly | Senior Pastor, AMBC
- Ed Harbison | Georgia Senate District 15 (Dean of the GA Senate)
- Elaina Beeman | City of Rome Commissioner
- Erica Wilson, Esq. | Attorney
- Ernest L. Ellis | President & CEO, FS 360, LLC
- Eskender Abebe | President, Benchmark Management
- Everton Blair | U.S. Congressman (GA-13th)
- Francine Scott | Richmond County Commissioner
- Frank Whitehead | CEO/Founder, Buckhead's Finest Car Wash and Interstate Traffic Control
- U.S. Congressman Hank Johnson | Congressman of 4th Congressional District of Georgia Dekalb County
- Helen Butler | Executive Director, Georgia Coalition for the People's Agenda
- Isaiah Hugley | Mayor Elect Columbus, GA
- Israel Small | Veteran
- Jaha Howard | Senator, Georgia District 35
- Jacques Laurent | Caribbean Community
- Janice Mathis, Esq. | Director, NCBCP Thomas W. Dortch Institute at Clark Atlanta University
- Jazzmin Cobble | Mayor Jazzmin Cobble, City of Stonecrest
- Jeanie Hunter | CEO, Synergy Development Partners, LLC
- Jermaine Whirl | President, Savannah State University
- Jerry Gonzalez | CEO, GALEO & GALEO Impact Fund
- Jim Flowers | Technology Governance Executive
- John Bey, Esq. | Bey & Associates
- Reverend Johnny Flakes | Interdenominational Alliance
- June Krise | RN, Quality of Life Enterprises, Inc; 9th Congressional District Chair
- Honorable Kasim Reed | Former Mayor, City of Atlanta
- Katie Vizas | Human Resource Expert
- Keilani Parker, Esq. | Keilani K. Parker, Attorney/Founder, Between the Vote LLC
- Keith E. Gammage, Esq. | Attorney Keith E. Gammage, Solicitor -General, Fulton County, Georgia
- Kelsi Queen-Robinson | CEO, EGM Services, Inc.
- Kenya Simmons | CEO T & J Industries Development and Contracting Inc.
- Kenyatta Mitchell | President, Roll Call Local Decisions LLC
- Kyle Williams, Esq. | Attorney
- Lee Webster | Farmer (Burke County)
- Leona Barr Davenport | President and CEO at Atlanta Business League
- Lorraine Cochran-Johnson | DeKalb County Chief Executive Officer
- Lucious Adams | Farmer
- Lucy McBath | Congresswoman of 6th Congressional District of Georgia
- Marci Collier Overstreet | 10th President, Atlanta City Council
- Mark Raxton | District 3 Commissioner for Douglas County
- Marvin Arrington | Fulton County Commissioner
- Mawuli Davis, Esq. | Co-Founding Partner, Davis Bozeman Johnson Law
- Melody Maddox | Sheriff of Dekalb County
- Mereda Davis Johnson | DeKalb County Commissioner, 5th District
- Michael Julian Bond | Atlanta City Council
- Bishop Michael Mitchell | Presiding Bishop Sixth District AME Church
- Michael Thurmond | Former Georgia Labor Commissioner
- Milton H. Jones Jr | Co-founder, Peachtree Providence Partners
- Mohamed Balla | Mohamed M. Balla, CFO, City of Atlanta
- Na’eema Rashad | COO, JWJ Enterprise LLC | Jeezy
- Nancy Flake Johnson | President & CEO, Urban League of Greater Atlanta
- Nicole Love Henderson | Chair of Gwinnett Board of Commissions
- U.S. Congresswoman Nikema Williams | Congresswoman of 5th Congressional District of Georgia
- Norrene Johnson Duffy | President, Red Bridge Consulting
- Onaje Henderson | Onaje M. Henderson, Co-Owner, ZuCot Gallery
- Sheriff Patrick Labat | Fulton County Sheriff
- Paul Mosley Sr | President, Longshoreman's Association Local 1414
- Rahul Garabadu, Esq. | Attorney
- Rhonda Briggins | Pond and Company
- Richard Rose | CEO Communities United for Justice
- Rick Hart | Former Advisor for Intergovernmental Affairs, The Biden-Harris White House
- Dr. Roderick Edmond, M.D., J.D., Esq. | Attorney, The Edmond Firm
- Ronald Sanders Jr. | President, FirstClass Healthcare
- Royal Anderson | BA, RN (Ret.) Chair, Muscogee County Democratic Committee Democratic Party of Georgia
- Ryan Germany, Esq. | Attorney
- Sandra Lee Williams | Deputy Political Director RWDSU/UFCW, President, Atlanta North Georgia Labor Council
- Sanford Bishop | Congresswoman of 2nd Congressional District of Georgia
- Segun Adeyina | Georgia State Representative District 110
- Shelia Hudson | CEO, Hudson and Associates
- Honorable Shirley C Franklin | Former Mayor, City of Atlanta
- Shirley Langley | CPA
- Shyam Reddy | Shyam K. Reddy, President and CEO, BlueLinx Corporation
- Stacey Evans | Georgia State Representative District 57
- Susana Chavez | EVP Park Place, Partner Chavez Properties
- Susan Pease Langford, Esq. | Partner, Butler Snow LLP
- Tiffany Callaway Ferrell | Senior Vice President, Operations Atlanta Gas Light and Chattanooga Gas
- Tim Davis | Vice President of Government Affairs & Membership, Georgia Nurses Association
- Sheriff Tim Pounds | Sheriff of Douglas County
- Tori M. Silas, Esq. | Tori M, Silas, Esq., Immediate Past Chair, Cobb County Board of Elections
- Van R. Johnson, II | Mayor, City of Savannah, GA
- Veronica Maldonado-Torres | President & CEO, Georgia Hispanic Chamber of Commerce (GHCC)
- Victor Hydel | President of 755 Restaurant Corporation
- William Boddie, Esq. | Attorney
- Yvonne T Brooks | President, Georgia State AFL-CIO
