= 2026 Georgia state elections =

United States elections

2026 Georgia elections
- November 3, 2026; December 1, 2026

Several elections were held in the U.S. state of Georgia in 2026. The general election was held on November 3, 2026, with runoffs set for December 1, 2026 if no candidate reaches past the 50% threshold.

Party primaries for the U.S. Senate, U.S. House and other state and county offices were held on May 19, 2026. Primary runoffs took place on June 16, 2026 in races where no candidate reached the 50% threshold. In addition, several nonpartisan general elections for judicial offices and certain consolidated city-county governments were held on May 19, 2026, concurrent with the partisan primaries, with runoffs for the nonpartisan elections to take place on June 16, 2026, if no candidate reached past the 50% threshold.

Similar to results elsewhere, the results were considered a wave election, with Democrats winning all statewide constitutional offices (for the first time since 1994), flipping the State House, reducing the Republican majority in the State Senate to a one-seat majority, and flipping control of the Public Service Commission for the first time since 1996.

== Federal offices ==
=== United States Senate ===
Democratic incumbent Jon Ossoff won re-election against Republican congressman Mike Collins. Ossoff's victory made him the first Democrat to be reelected to this seat since 1990 and the first Democrat to win a US Senate election in Georgia without a runoff since 1984.

=== United States House of Representatives ===
Despite increased support for Democrats, Republicans retained a 9-5 majority of the state's congressional delegation, although the Democrats won a majority of the popular vote by margin of 56.21% to 43.79%.

== Statewide offices ==
=== Governor ===
Republican governor Brian Kemp was term-limited. Republican business owner Rick Jackson ran against Democratic former mayor of Atlanta Keisha Lance Bottoms. Bottoms won the election, flipping the office to Democrats for the first time since 2002.

=== Lieutenant Governor ===
Republican lieutenant governor Burt Jones retired to run unsuccessfully for governor, but was defeated in the primary. Republican state senator Greg Dolezal ran against Democratic state senator Josh McLaurin. McLaurin defeated Dolezal, flipping the office Democrats for the first time since 2006.

=== Attorney General ===
Two-term Republican incumbent Chris Carr retired to run unsuccessfully for governor. Republican state senator Brian Strickland ran against Democratic state representative Tanya Miller. Miller defeated Strickland, flipping the office to Democrats for the first time since 2010.

=== Secretary of State ===
Republican incumbent Brad Raffensperger retired to run unsuccessfully for governor. Republican state representative Tim Fleming ran against Democratic former judge and television host Penny Brown Reynolds. Reynolds defeated Miller, flipping the office to Democrats for the first time since 2006.

=== Insurance Commissioner ===
Republican incumbent John F. King ran for a second full term, but was defeated by Democratic former state representative and former Atlanta City Council member Keisha Waites, flipping the office to Democrats for the first time since 1994.

=== Labor Commissioner ===
Republican incumbent Bárbara Rivera Holmes ran for a first full term against Democratic nonprofit founder Nikki Porcher. Porcher defeated Holmes, flipping the office to Democrats for the first time since 2010.

=== State Superintendent ===
Republican incumbent Richard Woods ran for a fourth term against Democratic educator Lydia Powell. Powell defeated Woods, flipping the office to Democrats for the first time since 1994.

=== Agriculture Commissioner ===
Republican incumbent Tyler Harper ran for a second term. Democratic nonprofit leader Katherine Juhan-Arnold won, flipping the office to Democrats for the first time since 2010.

=== Public Service Commission ===
Regular elections for the Georgia Public Service Commission were held for Districts 3 and 5.

Democratic incumbent Peter Hubbard, who flipped District 3 for a one-year term in the 2025 special election, was re-elected to a full six-year term in a rematch against Republican former member Fitz Johnson.

Republican incumbent Tricia Pridemore, who won re-election to District 5 in 2018 and whose term was extended by two years in 2024, did not run for another six-year term, instead retiring to run unsuccessfully for the U.S. House. Republican engineer Josh Tolbert ran against Democratic businessowner Shelia Edwards, with Edwards defeating Tolbert to flip the Public Service Commission to a three-seat Democratic majority for the first time since 1996.

== General Assembly ==
=== Georgia State Senate ===
Elections were held for all 56 seats in the Georgia State Senate. Republicans retained a one-seat majority, the closest split of seats since the 2000 election, in which both parties equally split the chamber. However, the Democrats won a majority of the popular vote, by a margin of 53.46% to 46.54%.

=== Georgia House of Representatives ===
Elections were held for all 180 seats in the Georgia House of Representatives. Democrats gained a two-seat majority, regaining control for the first time since the 2002 election.

== Ballot measures ==
=== Party advisory questions ===
During the primary elections voters of the Democratic Party of Georgia passed 2 questions and voters of the Georgia Republican Party passed 8. The questions are non binding.

=== Constitutional amendments ===
Three constitutional amendments were passed by voters in the general election, including one which removed probate judges from the November ballot as a partisan election and placed them on the May/June primary ballot as nonpartisan elections.

== District attorneys ==
9 out of 49 judicial circuits will hold elections for district attorney.

== Judicial offices ==
Three seats on the Supreme Court of Georgia are on the May 19 ballot. They are currently held by Sarah Warren, Charlie Bethel, and Benjamin Land.

Two challengers announced their candidacies in February 2026: Jen Jordan is challenging Presiding Justice Sarah Warren, while attorney Miracle Rankin is running against Justice Charlie Bethel.

== Local elections ==
During the regular primary, most counties will hold partisan primaries county commission seats, board of education seats, sheriff, and other countywide offices, while several consolidated city-county governments will hold nonpartisan elections for mayor, select city council and select board of education seats, including Columbus, Athens, and Augusta.

== Election administration ==
In August 2026, the Department of Homeland Security planned an increase in their voter fraud investigation efforts in select states. This increase prioritized home visits and interviews with individuals about their voter eligibility in 9 states, including Georgia. On October 21, 2026, federal judge, Araceli Martínez-Olguín, of California barred such visits and interviews in Georgia, and the other states; the order lasts until the polls close on November 3, 2026.
