= 2026 Georgia Public Service Commission election =

- November 3, 2026

2 of 5 seats on the Georgia Public Service Commission
| | First party | Second party |
|---|---|---|
| Party | Democratic | Republican |
| Seats before | 2 | 3 |
| Seats after | 3 | 2 |
| Seat change | ▲1 | ▼1 |

The 2026 Georgia Public Service Commission election was held on November 3, 2026, to elect two members of the Georgia Public Service Commission. Primary elections were held on May 19, and primary runoff elections will be held on June 16 in races where no candidate received a majority of the vote. Commissioners are elected statewide, but must live in the district they represent.

== Background ==
Prior to the 2025 special election, elections to the Public Service Commission (PSC) had not taken place since 2020 due to a lawsuit. After the lawsuit was dismissed, the General Assembly passed a bill that would resume regularly scheduled PSC elections. District 3 was on the ballot in the 2025 election, for a one-year term. Democrats won both seats in the 2025 election, marking their first statewide constitutional office win since 2006. As the minority, the two newly elected Democrats have been unable to pass pro-environmental motions, such as one to reconsider a grid expansion request to fuel data centers.

== Campaign ==
A total of ten candidates filed to run across both districts. Data center regulation was a key issue of the campaign, with Democrats in opposition to the recently passed data center-based expansion for Georgia Power. In the general election, Democrats Peter Hubbard and Sheila Edwards both won their races, successfully flipping control of the Public Service Commission.

== District 3 ==
2026 Georgia Public Service Commission District 3 election
- November 3, 2026
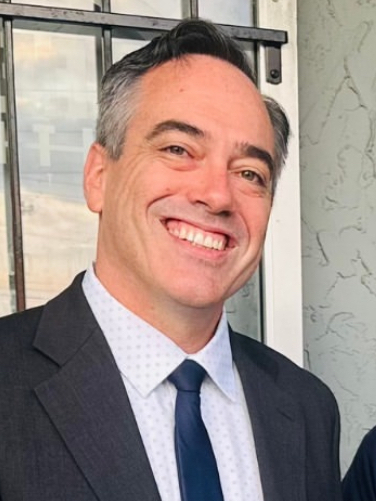

| Candidate | Peter Hubbard | Fitz Johnson |
| Party | Democratic | Republican |
| Popular vote | 2,335,368 | 1,807,113 |
| Percentage | 56.4% | 43.6% |
- Hubbard: 50–60% 60–70% 70–80% 80–90% 90–100% Johnson: 50–60% 60–70% 70–80% 80–90% 90–100%
Commissioner before election
Peter Hubbard
Democratic
Elected Commissioner
Peter Hubbard
Democratic

Incumbent commissioner Peter Hubbard ran for re-election and won. Former commissioner Fitz Johnson, whom Hubbard defeated in 2025, won the Republican nomination, setting up a rematch. Prior to the primary, Johnson faced a residency challenge claiming he lived in Cobb County, which is outside the third district. Despite not sleeping in a home he owns in Fulton County, a judge ruled his intent to maintain it as his legal residence allowed him to retain eligibility for the ballot.

=== Democratic primary ===
==== Candidates ====
===== Nominee =====
- Peter Hubbard, incumbent commissioner

==== Endorsements ====
Peter Hubbard

Organizations

- Georgia Conservation Voters
- Jane Fonda Climate PAC
- Southern Poverty Law Center Action Fund

==== Results ====
Democratic primary
| Party | Candidate | Votes | % |
|---|---|---|---|
| Democratic | Peter Hubbard (incumbent) | 944,474 | 100.0 |
| Total votes | | 944,474 | 100.0 |

=== Republican primary ===
==== Candidates ====
===== Nominee =====
- Fitz Johnson, former commissioner (2021–2026)

===== Eliminated in primary =====
- Brandon Martin, financer

==== Results ====
Primary results by county: Johnson: 50–60%; 60–70%; Martin: 50–60%; 60–70%

Republican primary
| Party | Candidate | Votes | % |
|---|---|---|---|
| Republican | Fitz Johnson | 389,682 | 50.2 |
| Republican | Brandon Martin | 386,640 | 49.8 |
| Total votes | | 776,322 | 100.0 |

=== General election ===
==== Post-primary endorsements ====
Peter Hubbard (D)

Organizations

- Fair Fight Action

==== Polling ====
| Poll source | Date(s) administered | Sample size (Note: Key: A – all adults RV – registered voters LV – likely voters V – unclear) | Margin of error | Peter Hubbard (D) | Fitz Johnson (R) | Other | Undecided |
|---|---|---|---|---|---|---|---|
| Quantus Insights | July 29 – August 1, 2026 | 815 (LV) | ± 3.6% | 39% | 38% | 2% (Note: "Another candidate" with 2%) | 20% |

==== Results ====
2026 Georgia Public Service Commission election, district 3
| Party | Candidate | Votes | % |
|---|---|---|---|
| Democratic | Peter Hubbard (incumbent) | 2,335,368 | 56.38 |
| Republican | Fitz Johnson | 1,807,113 | 43.62 |
| Total votes | | 4,142,481 | 100.00 |

== District 5 ==
2026 Georgia Public Service Commission District 5 election
- November 3, 2026
| Candidate | Shelia Edwards | Josh Tolbert |
| Party | Democratic | Republican |
| Popular vote | 2,294,542 | 1,854,001 |
| Percentage | 55.3% | 44.7% |
- Edwards: 50–60% 60–70% 70–80% 80–90% 90–100% Tolbert: 50–60% 60–70% 70–80% 80–90% 90–100%
Commissioner before election
Tricia Pridemore
Republican
Elected Commissioner
Shelia Edwards
Democratic

=== Republican primary ===
==== Candidates ====
===== Nominee =====
- Josh Tolbert, engineer and candidate for Georgia's 35th Senate district in 2025

===== Eliminated in runoff =====
- Bobby Mehan, business owner

===== Eliminated in primary =====
- Carolyn Roddy, attorney

===== Declined =====
- Tricia Pridemore, incumbent commissioner (ran for U.S. House)

==== Results ====
Primary results by county: Tolbert: 30–40%; 40–50%; 50–60%; 60–70%; Mehan: 30–40%; 40–50%; 50–60%; Roddy: 30–40%

Republican primary
| Party | Candidate | Votes | % |
|---|---|---|---|
| Republican | Josh Tolbert | 366,773 | 47.2 |
| Republican | Bobby Mehan | 241,553 | 31.1 |
| Republican | Carolyn Roddy | 169,405 | 21.8 |
| Total votes | | 777,731 | 100.0 |

==== Runoff ====
===== Results =====
Runoff results by county: Tolbert: 50–60%; 60–70%; 70–80%; Mehan: 50–60%

Republican primary runoff
| Party | Candidate | Votes | % |
|---|---|---|---|
| Republican | Josh Tolbert | 371,567 | 59.8 |
| Republican | Bobby Mehan | 250,229 | 40.2 |
| Total votes | | 621,796 | 100.0 |

=== Democratic primary ===
==== Candidates ====
===== Nominee =====
- Shelia Edwards, business owner and nominee in the cancelled 2022 election

===== Eliminated in primary =====
- Craig Cupid, intellectual property attorney
- Angelia Pressley, Clark Atlanta University faculty member

==== Endorsements ====
Craig Cupid

Statewide officials

- Roy Barnes, former governor of Georgia (1999–2003)

==== Results ====
Primary results by county: Edwards: 40–50%; 50–60%; 60–70%; 70–80%

Democratic primary
| Party | Candidate | Votes | % |
|---|---|---|---|
| Democratic | Shelia Edwards | 557,449 | 55.7 |
| Democratic | Angelia Pressley | 259,590 | 25.9 |
| Democratic | Craig Cupid | 183,989 | 18.4 |
| Total votes | | 1,001,028 | 100.0 |

=== General election ===
==== Polling ====
| Poll source | Date(s) administered | Sample size | Margin of error | Josh Tolbert (R) | Shelia Edwards (D) | Other | Undecided |
|---|---|---|---|---|---|---|---|
| Quantus Insights | July 29 – August 1, 2026 | 815 (LV) | ± 3.6% | 38% | 40% | 1% (Note: "Another candidate" with 1%) | 20% |

==== Results ====
2026 Georgia Public Service Commission election, district 5
| Party | Candidate | Votes | % |
|---|---|---|---|
| Democratic | Shelia Edwards | 2,294,542 | 55.31 |
| Republican | Josh Tolbert | 1,854,001 | 44.69 |
| Total votes | | 4,148,543 | 100.00 |
