= 2026 United States House of Representatives elections in Georgia =

- November 3, 2026

All 14 Georgia seats to the United States House of Representatives
	Majority party	Minority party
Party	Republican	Democratic
Last election	9	5
Seats won	9	5
Seat change	Steady	Steady
Popular vote	1,825,455	2,342,772
Percentage	43.79%	56.21%
Swing	▼8.71%	▲8.71%

Republican:
50–60%
60–70%
70–80%
80–90%
90–100%
Democratic:
50–60%
60–70%
70–80%
80–90%
90–100%

The 2026 United States House of Representatives elections in Georgia were held on November 3, 2026, to elect the 14 U.S. representatives from the state of Georgia. The elections coincided with other elections to the House of Representatives, elections to the United States Senate, and various state and local elections. Primary elections took place on May 19, 2026, and in races where no candidate received over 50% in a primary, runoff elections were held on June 16.

Although Democrats won the popular vote in Georgia for the first time since 1992 (roughly 56%-44%), the distribution of seats did not change: 9 Republicans and 5 Democrats.

== District 1 ==
2026 Georgia' 1st congressional district election
Nominee	Jim Kingston	Amanda Hollowell
Party	Republican	Democratic
Popular vote	140,222	132,498
Percentage	51.4%	48.6%
- Kingston: 50–60% 60–70% 70–80% 80–90% Hollowell: 60–70%
U.S. Representative before election
Buddy Carter
Republican
Elected U.S. Representative
Jim Kingston
Republican

The 1st district is based in the southeast corner of the state, encompassing Savannah. The incumbent is Republican Buddy Carter, who was re-elected with 62.0% of the vote in 2024. On May 8, 2025, Carter announced that he would run for U.S. Senate in 2026.

=== Republican primary ===
==== Nominee ====
- Jim Kingston, insurance salesman and son of former U.S. representative Jack Kingston

==== Eliminated in primary ====
- Patrick Farrell, Chatham County commissioner (2004–present)
- Brian Montgomery, retired U.S. Army lieutenant colonel
- Krista Penn, healthcare executive
- Kandiss Taylor, district 1 chair for the Georgia Republican Party, candidate for U.S. Senate in 2020, and candidate for governor in 2022
- Eugene Yu, retired businessman and perennial candidate

==== Declined ====
- James Burchett, state representative from the 176th district (2019–present)
- Buddy Carter, incumbent U.S representative (ran for U.S. Senate)
- Vernon Jones, former Democratic CEO of DeKalb County (2001–2009) and candidate for this district in 2022 (running for Secretary of State)
- Jesse Petrea, state representative from the 166th district (2015–present)
- Ron Stephens, state representative from the 164th district (1997–present)
- Ben Watson, state senator from the 1st district (2015–present) (endorsed Kingston)

==== Endorsements ====
Jim Kingston

Executive branch officials

- Donald Trump, 45th and 47th president of the United States (2017–2021, 2025–present)
- Mack Mattingly, former U.S. Ambassador to Seychelles (1992–1993) and former U.S. senator from Georgia (1981–1987)

U.S. senators

- Ted Cruz, Texas (2013–present)
- Saxby Chambliss, former Georgia (2003–2015)

U.S. representatives

- Tom Emmer, House majority whip (2023–present) from MN-06 (2015–present)
- Mike Johnson, speaker of the House (2023–present) from LA-04 (2017–present)
- Jim Jordan, OH-04 (2007–present)
- Rich McCormick, GA-07 (2023–present)
- David McIntosh, former IN-02 (1995–2001)
- Steve Scalise, House majority leader (2023–present) from LA-01 (2008–present)

Statewide officials

- Brian Kemp, governor of Georgia (2019–present)

State legislators

- Eric Johnson, former state senator from the 1st district (1995–2009) and candidate for governor in 2010
- Ben Watson, state senator from the 1st district (2015–present)

Organizations

- NRA Political Victory Fund
- U.S. Chamber of Commerce
Brian Montgomery

U.S. representatives

- John James, MI-10 (2023–present)

==== Debates and forums ====
2026 GA-01 Republican primary debates and forums
No.	Date	Host	Moderator	Link	Participants					
P Participant A Absent N Non-invitee I Invitee W Withdrawn										
P Participant A Absent N Non-invitee I Invitee W Withdrawn					Ferrell	Kingston	Montgomery	Penn	Taylor	Yu
1	April 26, 2026	Atlanta Press Club	Tina Tyus-Shaw	YouTube	P	P	P	P	P	P

==== Fundraising ====
Campaign finance reports as of April 29, 2026
Candidate	Raised	Spent	Cash on hand
Jim Kingston (R)	$1,862,606	$913,390	$949,215
Pat Farrell (R)	$656,764	$593,932	$62,832
Brian Montgomery (R)	$267,832	$222,692	$45,140
Eugene Yu (R)	$143,070	$151,534	$34,916
Kandiss Taylor (R)	$92,438	$88,902	$3,729
Krista Penn (R)	$21,417	$17,661	$3,756
Source: Federal Election Commission

==== Results ====
Republican primary results
Party	Candidate	Votes	%
Republican	Jim Kingston	37,025	52.4
Republican	Patrick Farrell	12,193	17.2
Republican	Kandiss Taylor	8,875	12.6
Republican	Brian Montgomery	7,088	10.0
Republican	Eugene Yu	3,083	4.4
Republican	Krista Penn	2,428	3.4
Total votes		70,692	100.0

=== Democratic primary ===
==== Nominee ====
- Amanda Hollowell, political organizer

==== Eliminated in runoff ====
- Joyce Griggs, retired attorney and perennial candidate

==== Eliminated in primary ====
- Defonsio Daniels, security instructor
- Michael McCord, business consultant
- Joseph Palimeno, vice chair of the Camden County Democratic Party
- Sharon Williamson, public health professional
- Patrick Wilver, small business owner
- Randy Zurcher, union representative

==== Declined ====
- Anne Allen Westbrook, state representative from the 163rd district (2023–present)
- Aaron Whitely, Chatham County commissioner and chair of the Chatham County Democratic Party

==== Endorsements ====
Amanda Hollowell

Executive branch Officials

- Kamala Harris, former Vice President of the United States (2021–2025)

U.S. Representatives

- Ro Khanna, CA 17th District (2017-Present)

Local Officials

- Van R. Johnson, Mayor of Savannah (2020-Present)

Political parties

- Georgia Working Families Party
Michael McCord (Eliminated in Primary)

U.S. representatives

- John Barrow, former GA-12 (2005–2015)

==== Debates and forums ====
2026 GA-01 Democratic primary debates and forums
No.	Date	Host	Moderator	Link	Participants							
P Participant A Absent N Non-invitee I Invitee W Withdrawn												
P Participant A Absent N Non-invitee I Invitee W Withdrawn					Daniels	Griggs	Hollowell	McCord	Palimeno	Williamson	Wilver	Zurcher
1	April 26, 2026	Atlanta Press Club	Tina Tyus-Shaw	YouTube	A	A	P	P	P	A	P	P

==== Fundraising ====
Campaign finance reports as of May 27, 2026
Candidate	Raised	Spent	Cash on hand
Michael McCord (D)	$224,654	$58,992	$147,167
Amanda Hollowell (D)	$135,436	$117,193	$18,243
Patrick Wilver (D)	$55,937	$42,356	$13,581
Joyce Griggs (D)	$37,048	$33,073	$4,055
Randy Zurcher (D)	$11,938	$9,468	$2,470
Sharon Stokes-Williamson (D)	$6,785	$6,462	$323
Source: Federal Election Commission

==== Results ====
Democratic primary results
Party	Candidate	Votes	%
Democratic	Joyce Griggs	19,694	34.5
Democratic	Amanda Hollowell	14,095	24.7
Democratic	Sharon Williamson	8,501	14.9
Democratic	Defonsio Daniels	5,359	9.4
Democratic	Patrick Wilver	4,003	7.0
Democratic	Michael McCord	3,140	5.5
Democratic	Randy Zurcher	1,517	2.7
Democratic	Joseph Palimeno	850	1.5
Total votes		57,159	100.0

==== Runoff results ====
Democratic primary runoff results
Party	Candidate	Votes	%
Democratic	Amanda Hollowell	12,618	53.0
Democratic	Joyce Griggs	11,206	47.0
Total votes		23,824	100.0

=== General election ===
==== Predictions ====
Source	Ranking	As of
Decision Desk HQ	Likely R	July 14, 2026
The Cook Political Report	Solid R	February 6, 2025
Inside Elections	Solid R	March 7, 2025
Sabato's Crystal Ball	Safe R	July 15, 2025

==== Post-primary endorsements ====
Amanda Hollowell (D)

Organizations

- National Women's Political Caucus
- Reproductive Freedom for All

==== Fundraising ====
Campaign finance reports as of October 14, 2026
Candidate	Raised	Spent	Cash on hand
Jim Kingston (R)	$2,357,233	$2,087,278	$269,955
Amanda Hollowell (D)	$264,753	$214,978	$50,137
Source: Federal Election Commission

==== Results ====
2026 Georgia's 1st congressional district election
Party	Candidate	Votes	%	±%
Republican	Jim Kingston	140,266	51.4	
Democratic	Amanda Hollowell	132,609	48.6	
Total votes		272,875	100	

== District 2 ==
2026 Georgia' 2nd congressional district election
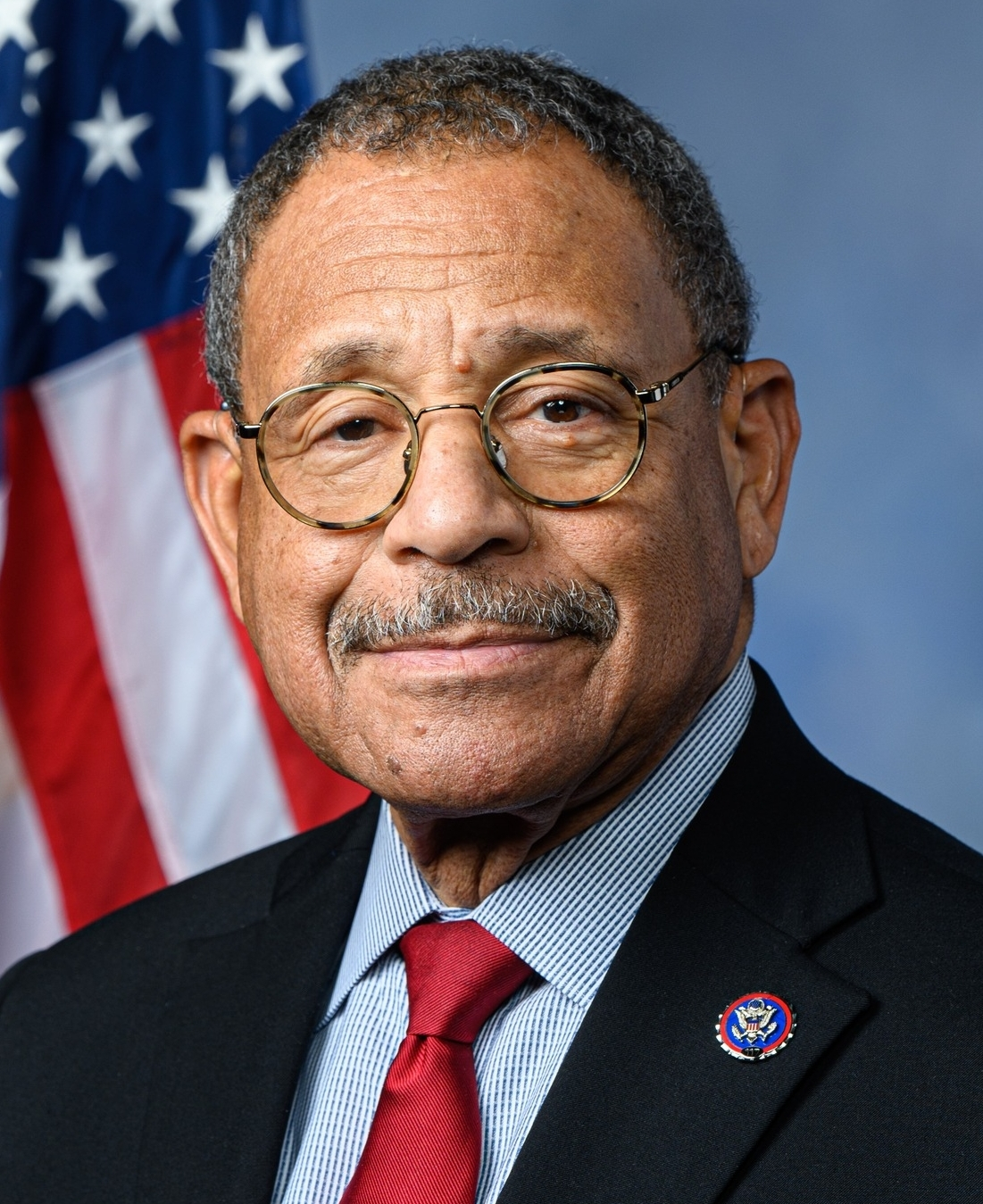

Nominee	Sanford Bishop	Matt Day
Party	Democratic	Republican
Popular vote	148,238	95,608
Percentage	60.8%	39.2%
- Bishop: 50–60% 60–70% 70–80% Day: 50–60% 60–70% 70–80%
U.S. Representative before election
Sanford Bishop
Democratic
Elected U.S. Representative
Sanford Bishop
Democratic

The 2nd district encompasses the Southwest corner of the state, including most of Columbus. The incumbent is Democrat Sanford Bishop, who was re-elected with 56.3% of the vote in 2024.

=== Democratic primary ===
==== Nominee ====
- Sanford Bishop, incumbent U.S. representative

==== Endorsements ====
Sanford Bishop

Organizations

- Planned Parenthood Action Fund
- Southern Poverty Law Center Action Fund

==== Fundraising ====
Campaign finance reports as of March 31, 2026
Candidate	Raised	Spent	Cash on hand
Sanford Bishop (D)	$890,390	$704,282	$368,968
Danny Glover (D) (Note: As last reported on June 30, 2025)	$4,675	$2,882	$1,892
Source: Federal Election Commission

==== Results ====
Democratic primary results
Party	Candidate	Votes	%
Democratic	Sanford Bishop (incumbent)	72,498	100.0
Total votes		72,498	100.0

=== Republican primary ===
==== Nominee ====
- Matt Day, businessman

==== Fundraising ====
Campaign finance reports as of March 31, 2026
Candidate	Raised	Spent	Cash on hand
Matt Day (R)	$97,451	$90,887	$6,563
Chuck Hand (R)	$874	$874	$0
Arthur Johnson (R)	$8,000	$9,861	$0
Source: Federal Election Commission

==== Results ====
Republican primary results
Party	Candidate	Votes	%
Republican	Matt Day	42,639	100.0
Total votes		42,639	100.0

=== General election ===
==== Predictions ====
Source	Ranking	As of
Decision Desk HQ	Safe D	July 14, 2026
The Cook Political Report	Solid D	February 6, 2025
Inside Elections	Solid D	March 7, 2025
Sabato's Crystal Ball	Safe D	July 15, 2025

==== Fundraising ====
Campaign finance reports as of October 14, 2026
Candidate	Raised	Spent	Cash on hand
Sanford Bishop (D)	$1,362,149	$1,113,485	$431,525
Matt Day (R)	$217,632	$217,632	$0
Source: Federal Election Commission

==== Results ====
2026 Georgia's 2nd congressional district election
Party	Candidate	Votes	%	±%
Democratic	Sanford Bishop (incumbent)			
Republican	Matt Day			
Total votes				

== District 3 ==
2026 Georgia' 3rd congressional district election
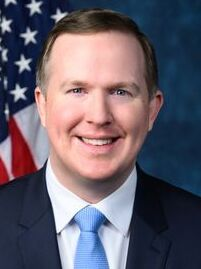

Nominee	Brian Jack	Maura Keller
Party	Republican	Democratic
Popular vote	188,569	133,120
Percentage	58.6%	41.4%
- Jack: 50–60% 60–70% 80–90% Keller: 50–60% 70–80%
U.S. Representative before election
Brian Jack
Republican
Elected U.S. Representative
Brian Jack
Republican

The 3rd district comprises central-west Georgia, containing the Northern suburbs of Columbus as well as the Southwestern suburbs of Atlanta. The incumbent is Republican Brian Jack, who was elected with 66.3% of the vote in 2024.

=== Republican primary ===
==== Nominee ====
- Brian Jack, incumbent U.S. representative

==== Endorsements ====
Brian Jack

Organizations

- AIPAC

==== Fundraising ====
Campaign finance reports as of March 31, 2026
Candidate	Raised	Spent	Cash on hand
Brian Jack (R)	$1,551,710	$981,727	$810,159
Source: Federal Election Commission

==== Results ====
Republican primary results
Party	Candidate	Votes	%
Republican	Brian Jack (incumbent)	87,643	100.0
Total votes		87,643	100.0

=== Democratic primary ===
==== Nominee ====
- Maura Keller, salon owner and nominee for this district in 2024

==== Eliminated in primary ====
- George Johnson, attorney

==== Endorsements ====
Maura Keller

Labor unions

- Georgia AFL-CIO

==== Fundraising ====
Campaign finance reports as of March 31, 2026
Candidate	Raised	Spent	Cash on hand
Maura Keller (D)	$80,403	$35,181	$48,177
Source: Federal Election Commission

==== Results ====
Democratic primary results
Party	Candidate	Votes	%
Democratic	Maura Keller	33,964	60.8
Democratic	George Johnson	21,881	39.2
Total votes		55,845	100.0

=== General election ===
==== Predictions ====
Source	Ranking	As of
Decision Desk HQ	Safe R	July 14, 2026
The Cook Political Report	Solid R	February 6, 2025
Inside Elections	Solid R	March 7, 2025
Sabato's Crystal Ball	Safe R	July 15, 2025

==== Fundraising ====
Campaign finance reports as of October 14, 2026
Candidate	Raised	Spent	Cash on hand
Brian Jack (R)	$2,431,348	$1,565,561	$1,105,820
Maura Keller (D)	$246,621	$156,055	$93,522
Source: Federal Election Commission

==== Polling ====
Poll source	Date(s) administered	Sample size (Note: Key: A – all adults RV – registered voters LV – likely voters V – unclear)	Margin of error	Brian Jack (R)	Maura Keller (D)	Undecided
VoteNexus (D) (Note: Poll sponsored by Keller's campaign)	October 2–7, 2026	301 (LV)	± 5.6%	50%	45%	5%

==== Results ====
2026 Georgia's 3rd congressional district election
Party	Candidate	Votes	%	±%
Republican	Brian Jack (incumbent)			
Democratic	Maura Keller			
Total votes				

== District 4 ==
2026 Georgia' 4th congressional district election
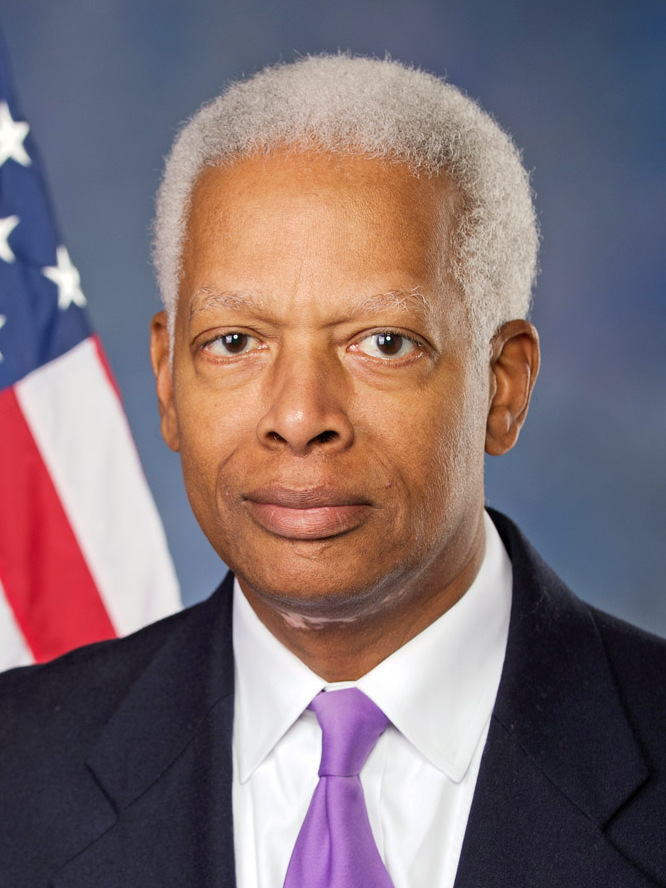

Nominee	Hank Johnson	James Duffie
Party	Democratic	Republican
Popular vote	217,144	45,619
Percentage	82.6%	17.4%
- Johnson: 70–80% 80–90%
U.S. Representative before election
Hank Johnson
Democratic
Elected U.S. Representative
Hank Johnson
Democratic

The 4th district is based in the Southeast suburbs and regions of Atlanta. The incumbent is Democrat Hank Johnson, who was re-elected with 75.6% of the vote in 2024.

=== Democratic primary ===
==== Nominee ====
- Hank Johnson, incumbent U.S. representative

==== Eliminated in primary ====
- Ansel Postell, businessman
- Benedict "Ben" Truman II, candidate for DeKalb County commission District 1 in 2020

==== Endorsements ====
Hank Johnson

Labor unions

- Georgia AFL-CIO

Organizations

- Planned Parenthood Action Fund
- Reproductive Freedom for All
- Southern Poverty Law Center Action Fund

==== Fundraising ====
Campaign finance reports as of March 31, 2026
Candidate	Raised	Spent	Cash on hand
Hank Johnson (D)	$296,842	$337,548	$70,969
Alex Robson (D)	$1,924	$1,868	$0
Source: Federal Election Commission

==== Results ====
Results by county: Johnson: 70–80%; 80–90%

Democratic primary results
Party	Candidate	Votes	%
Democratic	Hank Johnson (incumbent)	81,997	79.3
Democratic	Ansel Postell	12,052	11.7
Democratic	Ben Truman	9,366	9.1
Total votes		103,415	100.0

=== Republican primary ===
==== Nominee ====
- James Duffie, retired executive director for Pure Water Worldwide and veteran

==== Results ====
Republican primary results
Party	Candidate	Votes	%
Republican	James Duffie	17,390	100.0
Total votes		17,390	100.0

=== General election ===
==== Predictions ====
Source	Ranking	As of
Decision Desk HQ	Safe D	July 14, 2026
The Cook Political Report	Solid D	February 6, 2025
Inside Elections	Solid D	March 7, 2025
Sabato's Crystal Ball	Safe D	July 15, 2025

==== Fundraising ====
Campaign finance reports as of October 14, 2026
Candidate	Raised	Spent	Cash on hand
Hank Johnson (D)	$514,399	$500,640	$125,435
James Duffe (R)	$0	$0	$0
Source: Federal Election Commission

==== Results ====
2026 Georgia's 4th congressional district election
Party	Candidate	Votes	%	±%
Democratic	Hank Johnson (incumbent)			
Republican	James Duffe			
Total votes				

== District 5 ==
2026 Georgia' 5th congressional district election
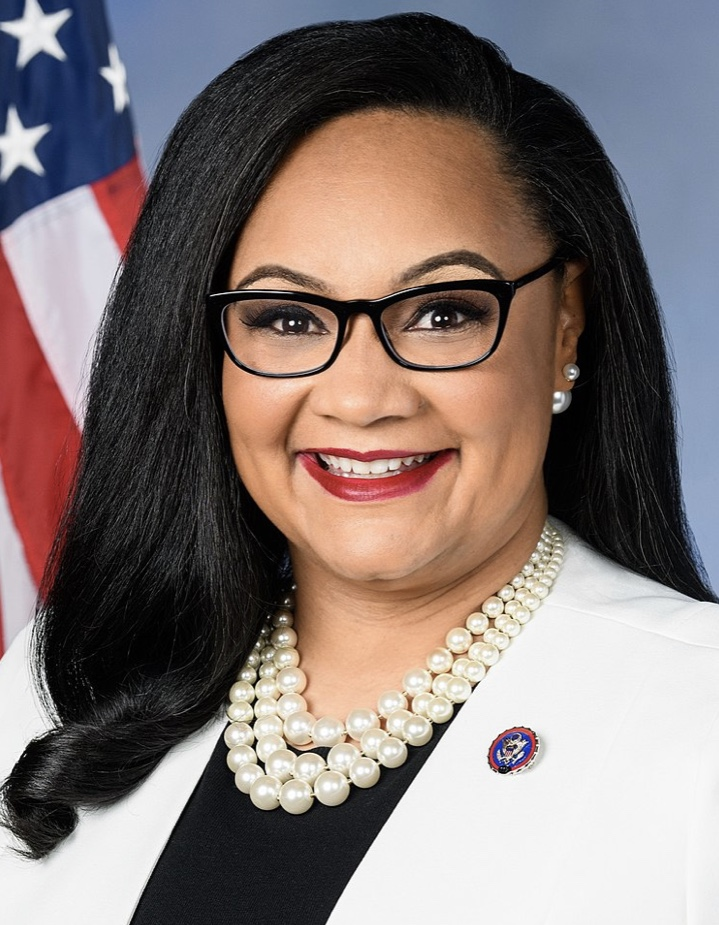

Nominee	Nikema Williams	John Salvesen
Party	Democratic	Republican
Popular vote	274,618	29,843
Percentage	90.2%	9.8%
- Williams: 80–90% 90–100%
U.S. Representative before election
Nikema Williams
Democratic
Elected U.S. Representative
Nikema Williams
Democratic

The 5th district comprises most of central Atlanta. The incumbent is Democrat Nikema Williams, who was re-elected with 85.7% of the vote in 2024.

=== Democratic primary ===
==== Nominee ====
- Nikema Williams, incumbent U.S. representative

==== Eliminated in primary ====
- Arnetress Beatty, consumer services specialist

==== Endorsements ====
Nikema Williams

Labor unions

- Georgia AFL-CIO
- United Auto Workers

Organizations

- AIPAC
- J Street
- Jewish Democratic Council of America
- Reproductive Freedom for All
- Planned Parenthood Action Fund
- Population Connection
- Vote Mama

==== Fundraising ====
Campaign finance reports as of March 31, 2026
Candidate	Raised	Spent	Cash on hand
Arnetress Beatty (D)	$6,400	$6,400	$0
Andres Castro (D)	$36,393	$35,626	$767
Nikema Williams (D)	$455,433	$420,837	$47,837
Source: Federal Election Commission

==== Results ====
Democratic primary results
Party	Candidate	Votes	%
Democratic	Nikema Williams (incumbent)	118,546	88.0
Democratic	Arnetress Beatty	16,186	12.0
Total votes		134,732	100.0

=== Republican primary ===
==== Nominee ====
- John Salvesen, handyman

==== Results ====
Republican primary results
Party	Candidate	Votes	%
Republican	John Salvesen	9,552	100.0
Total votes		9,552	100.0

=== General election ===
==== Predictions ====
Source	Ranking	As of
Decision Desk HQ	Safe D	July 14, 2026
The Cook Political Report	Solid D	February 6, 2025
Inside Elections	Solid D	March 7, 2025
Sabato's Crystal Ball	Safe D	July 15, 2025

==== Post-primary endorsements ====
Nikema Williams (D)

Organizations

- Giffords

==== Fundraising ====
Campaign finance reports as of October 14, 2026
Candidate	Raised	Spent	Cash on hand
Nikema Williams (D)	$772,833	$722,968	$63,107
John Salveson (R)	$0	$0	$0
Source: Federal Election Commission

==== Results ====
2026 Georgia's 5th congressional district election
Party	Candidate	Votes	%	±%
Democratic	Nikema Williams (incumbent)			
Republican	John Salvesen			
Total votes				

== District 6 ==
2026 Georgia' 6th congressional district election
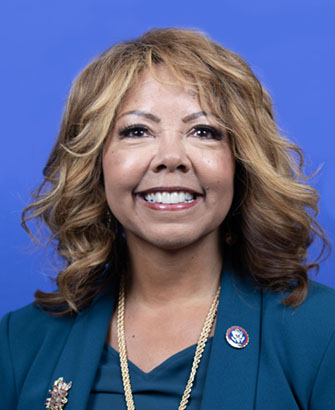

Nominee	Lucy McBath	Kevin Martin
Party	Democratic	Republican
Popular vote	263,795	62,334
Percentage	80.9%	19.1%
- McBath: 70–80% 80–90%
U.S. Representative before election
Lucy McBath
Democratic
Elected U.S. Representative
Lucy McBath
Democratic

The 6th district comprises suburbs and exurbs of Atlanta. The incumbent is Democrat Lucy McBath, who was re-elected with 74.7% of the vote in 2024.

=== Democratic primary ===
==== Nominee ====
- Lucy McBath, incumbent U.S. representative

==== Endorsements ====
Lucy McBath

U.S. representatives

- Gabby Giffords, former AZ-08 (2007-2012)

Labor unions

- United Auto Workers

Organizations

- AIPAC
- Black Economic Alliance PAC
- Democratic Majority for Israel
- Planned Parenthood Action Fund
- Reproductive Freedom for All
- Southern Poverty Law Center Action Fund

==== Fundraising ====
Campaign finance reports as of March 31, 2026
Candidate	Raised	Spent	Cash on hand
Lucy McBath (D)	$709,536	$1,061,691	$601,119
Source: Federal Election Commission

==== Results ====
Democratic primary results
Party	Candidate	Votes	%
Democratic	Lucy McBath (incumbent)	126,663	100.0
Total votes		126,663	100.0

=== Republican primary ===
==== Nominee ====
- Kevin Martin, controller

==== Eliminated in primary ====
- Justin Pinker, program director

==== Fundraising ====
Campaign finance reports as of March 31, 2026
Candidate	Raised	Spent	Cash on hand
Kevin Martin (R)	$10,320	$10,220	$100
Justin Pinker (R)	$15,213	$13,148	$2,064
Source: Federal Election Commission

==== Results ====
Republican primary results
Party	Candidate	Votes	%
Republican	Kevin Martin	16,878	70.1
Republican	Justin Pinker	7,197	29.9
Total votes		24,075	100.0

=== General election ===
==== Predictions ====
Source	Ranking	As of
Decision Desk HQ	Safe D	July 14, 2026
The Cook Political Report	Solid D	February 6, 2025
Inside Elections	Solid D	March 7, 2025
Sabato's Crystal Ball	Safe D	July 15, 2025

==== Post-primary endorsements ====
Lucy McBath (D)

Labor unions

- National Education Association

Organizations

- Democrats for Education Reform
- Giffords

==== Fundraising ====
Campaign finance reports as of October 14, 2026
Candidate	Raised	Spent	Cash on hand
Lucy McBath (D)	$1,189,989	$1,460,928	$682,336
Kevin Martin (R)	$10,320	$10,220	$100
Source: Federal Election Commission

==== Results ====
2026 Georgia's 6th congressional district election
Party	Candidate	Votes	%	±%
Democratic	Lucy McBath (incumbent)			
Republican	Kevin Martin			
Total votes				

== District 7 ==
2026 Georgia' 7th congressional district election
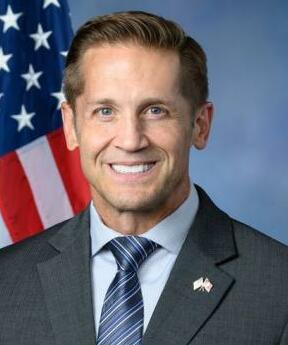

Nominee	Rich McCormick	Anthony Kozycki
Party	Republican	Democratic
Popular vote	191,539	149,323
Percentage	56.2%	43.8%
- McCormick: 60–70% 70–80% Kozycki: 50–60%
U.S. Representative before election
Rich McCormick
Republican
Elected U.S. Representative
Rich McCormick
Republican

The 7th district comprises suburban and rural regions north of Atlanta. The incumbent is Republican Rich McCormick, who was elected with 64.9% of the vote in 2024.

=== Republican primary ===
==== Nominee ====
- Rich McCormick, incumbent U.S. representative

==== Withdrawn ====
- Eric Barfield, financial services executive

==== Endorsements ====
Rich McCormick

Executive branch officials

- Donald Trump, 45th and 47th president of the United States (2017–2021, 2025–present)

Organizations

- AIPAC

==== Fundraising ====
Italics indicate a withdrawn candidate.

Campaign finance reports as of March 31, 2026
Candidate	Raised	Spent	Cash on hand
Eric Barfield (R)	$50,001	$50,001	$0
Rich McCormick (R)	$1,315,416	$1,177,211	$836,028
Source: Federal Election Commission

==== Results ====
Republican primary results
Party	Candidate	Votes	%
Republican	Rich McCormick (incumbent)	83,746	100.0
Total votes		83,746	100.0

=== Democratic primary ===
==== Nominee ====
- Anthony Kozycki, attorney

==== Eliminated in runoff ====
- Casey Norton, camera technician

==== Eliminated in primary ====
- Larry Long, former EPA hydrologist
- Jayson Toweh, environmental scientist

==== Endorsements ====
Casey Norton

Organizations

- Track AIPAC

==== Fundraising ====
Campaign finance reports as of May 27, 2026
Candidate	Raised	Spent	Cash on hand
Anthony Kozycki (D)	$370,743	$73,964	$291,410
Larry Long (D)	$50,997	$50,997	$0
Jayson Toweh (D)	$11,653	$8,630	$27
Casey Norton (D)	$10,781	$9,241	$2,774
Source: Federal Election Commission

==== Results ====
Democratic primary results
Party	Candidate	Votes	%
Democratic	Anthony Kozycki	19,742	39.9
Democratic	Casey Norton	11,043	22.3
Democratic	Jayson Toweh	9,367	19.0
Democratic	Larry Long	9,269	18.8
Total votes		49,421	100.0

==== Runoff results ====
Democratic primary runoff results
Party	Candidate	Votes	%
Democratic	Anthony Kozycki	11,667	67.7
Democratic	Casey Norton	5,561	32.3
Total votes		17,228	100.0

=== General election ===
==== Predictions ====
Source	Ranking	As of
Decision Desk HQ	Likely R	October 4, 2026
The Cook Political Report	Solid R	February 6, 2025
Inside Elections	Solid R	March 7, 2025
Sabato's Crystal Ball	Safe R	July 15, 2025

==== Post-primary endorsements ====
Rich McCormick (R)

Organizations

- U.S. Chamber of Commerce

==== Polling ====
Poll source	Date(s) administered	Sample size	Margin of error	Rich McCormick (R)	Anthony Kozycki (D)	Undecided
20/20 Insight (D) (Note: Poll sponsored by Kozycki's campaign)	October 6–9, 2026	457 (LV)	± 4.6%	45%	47%	8%
20/20 Insight (D)	August 20–26, 2026	445 (LV)	± 4.7%	46%	43%	11%

==== Fundraising ====
Campaign finance reports as of October 14, 2026
Candidate	Raised	Spent	Cash on hand
Rich McCormick (R)	$2,250,503	$1,612,453	$1,335,872
Anthony Kozycki (D)	$922,117	$429,686	$492,432
Source: Federal Election Commission

==== Results ====
2026 Georgia's 7th congressional district election
Party	Candidate	Votes	%	±%
Republican	Rich McCormick (incumbent)			
Democratic	Anthony Kozycki			
Total votes				

== District 8 ==
2026 Georgia' 8th congressional district election
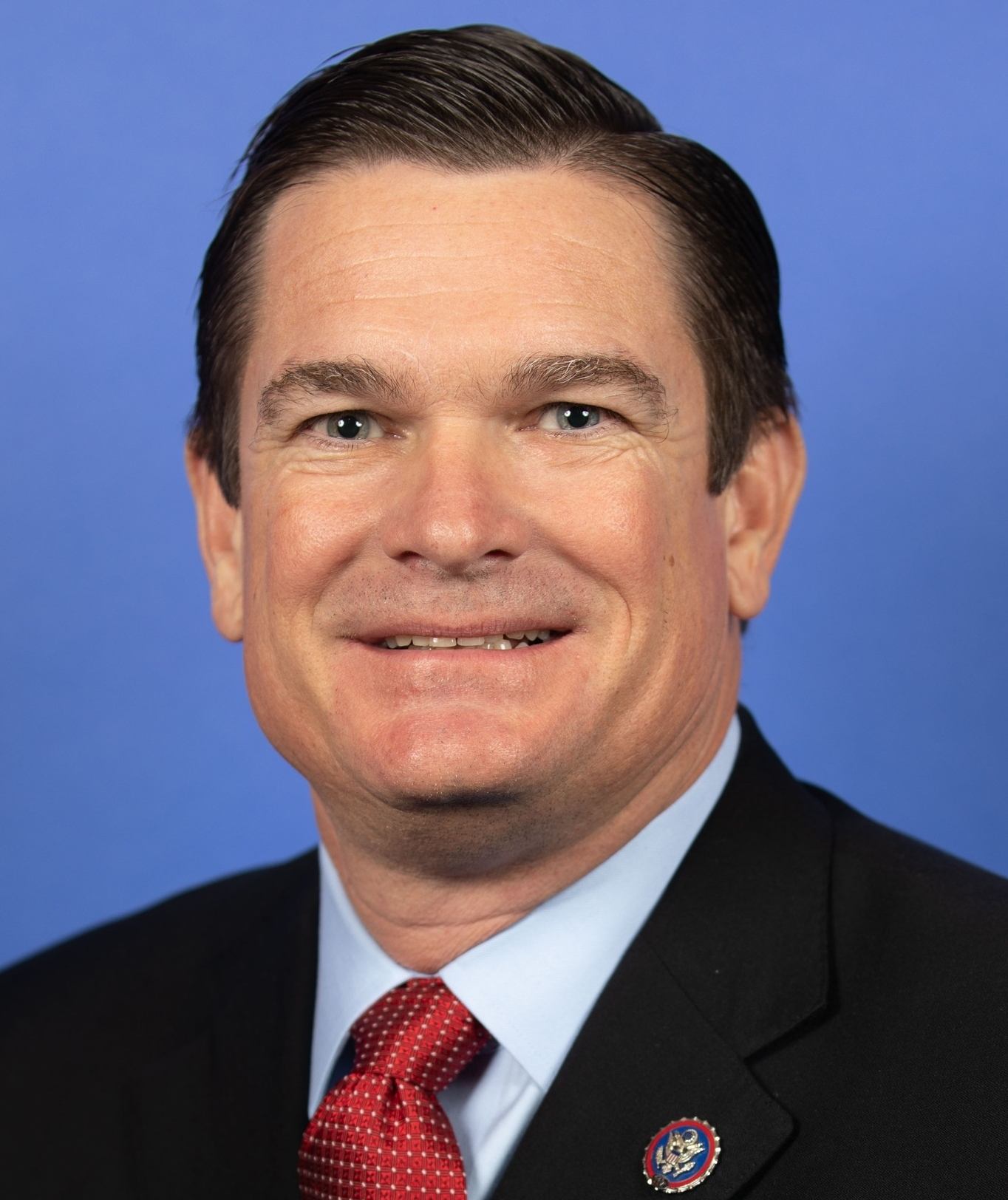

Nominee	Austin Scott	Kelly Esti
Party	Republican	Democratic
Popular vote	160,126	104,881
Percentage	60.4%	39.6%
- Scott: 50–60% 60–70% 70–80% 80–90% Esti: 50–60%
U.S. Representative before election
Austin Scott
Republican
Elected U.S. Representative
Austin Scott
Republican

The 8th district comprises a large sliver of the southern part of the state. The incumbent is Republican Austin Scott, who was re-elected with 68.9% of the vote in 2024.

=== Republican primary ===
==== Nominee ====
- Austin Scott, incumbent U.S. representative

==== Endorsements ====
Austin Scott

Executive branch officials

- Donald Trump, 45th and 47th president of the United States (2017–2021, 2025–present)

Organizations

- AIPAC

==== Fundraising ====
Campaign finance reports as of March 31, 2026
Candidate	Raised	Spent	Cash on hand
Austin Scott (R)	$900,863	$524,224	$1,356,804
Vince Watkins (R) (Note: As last reported on June 30, 2025)	$201	$63	$138
Source: Federal Election Commission

==== Results ====
Republican primary results
Party	Candidate	Votes	%
Republican	Austin Scott (incumbent)	72,036	100.0
Total votes		72,036	100.0

=== Democratic primary ===
==== Nominee ====
- Kelly Esti, businessman

==== Eliminated in primary ====
- Justin Lucas, Worth County school board member

==== Fundraising ====
Campaign finance reports as of March 31, 2026
Candidate	Raised	Spent	Cash on hand
Jimmy Cooper (D)	$123	$122	$1
Kelly Esti (D)	$17,655	$24,002	$2,662
Source: Federal Election Commission

==== Results ====
Democratic primary results
Party	Candidate	Votes	%
Democratic	Kelly Esti	23,828	53.5
Democratic	Justin Lucas	20,719	46.5
Total votes		44,547	100.0

=== General election ===
==== Predictions ====
Source	Ranking	As of
Decision Desk HQ	Safe R	July 14, 2026
The Cook Political Report	Solid R	February 6, 2025
Inside Elections	Solid R	March 7, 2025
Sabato's Crystal Ball	Safe R	July 15, 2025

==== Fundraising ====
Campaign finance reports as of October 14, 2026
Candidate	Raised	Spent	Cash on hand
Austin Scott (R)	$1,416,651	$1,080,761	$1,316,056
Kelly Esti (D)	$27,963	$28,914	$3,709
Source: Federal Election Commission

==== Results ====
2026 Georgia's 8th congressional district election
Party	Candidate	Votes	%	±%
Republican	Austin Scott (incumbent)			
Democratic	Kelly Esti			
Total votes				

== District 9 ==
2026 Georgia' 9th congressional district election
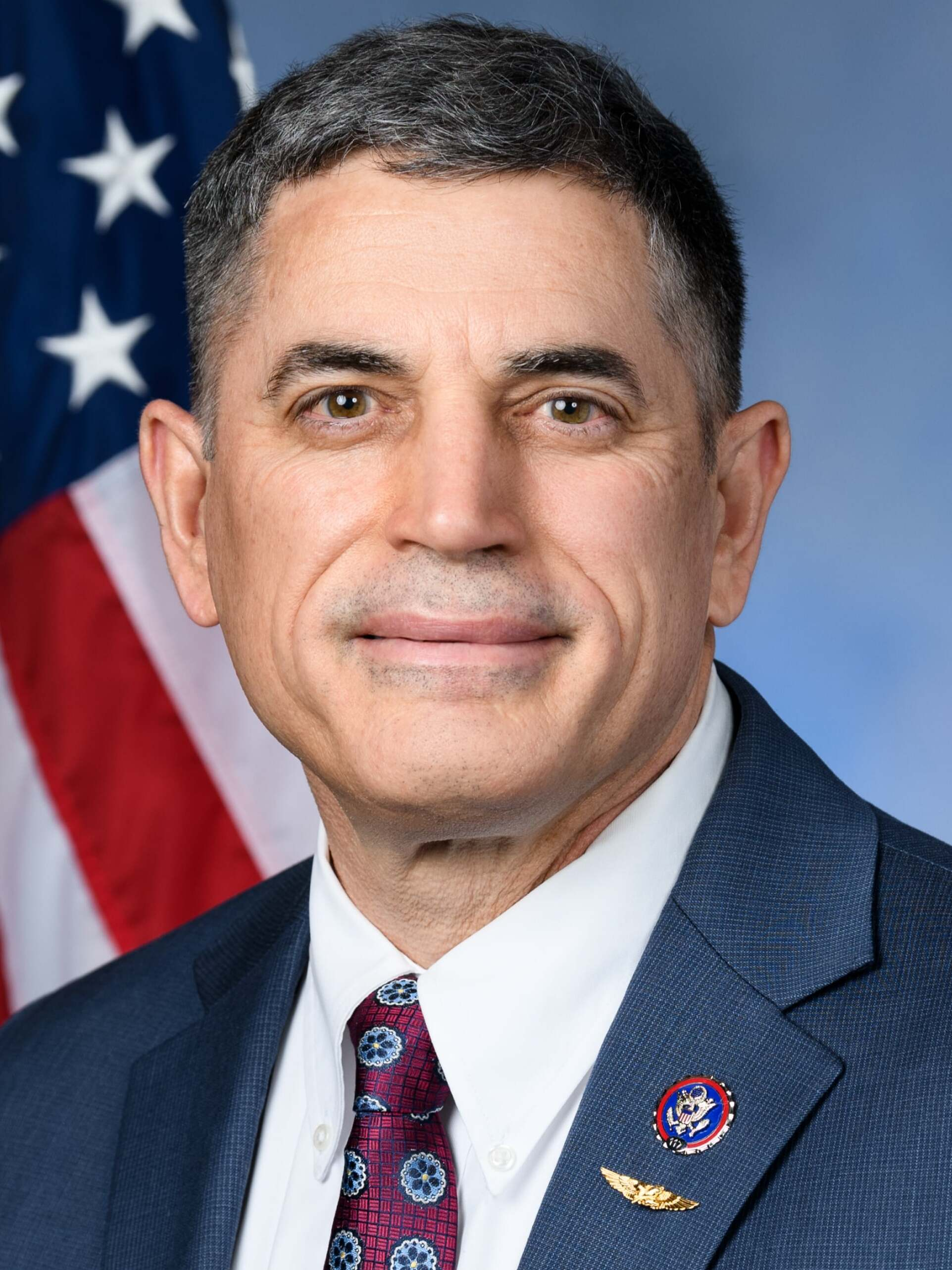

Nominee	Andrew Clyde	Caitlyn Gegen
Party	Republican	Democratic
Popular vote	182,890	125,532
Percentage	59.3%	40.7%
- Clyde: 60–70% 70–80% 80–90% Gegen: 60–70%
U.S. Representative before election
Andrew Clyde
Republican
Elected U.S. Representative
Andrew Clyde
Republican

The 9th district encompasses the northeast part of the state. The incumbent is Republican Andrew Clyde, who was re-elected with 69.0% of the vote in 2024.

=== Republican primary ===
==== Nominee ====
- Andrew Clyde, incumbent U.S. Representative

==== Eliminated in primary ====
- Sam Couvillon, mayor of Gainesville
- Gregg Poole, Hall County commissioner (2022–present)

==== Endorsements ====
Andrew Clyde

Executive branch officials

- Donald Trump, 45th and 47th president of the United States (2017–2021, 2025–present)

==== Fundraising ====
Campaign finance reports as of March 31, 2026
Candidate	Raised	Spent	Cash on hand
Andrew Clyde (R)	$553,572	$311,824	$337,732
Sam Couvillon (R)	$679,808	$459,712	$220,096
Gregg Poole (R)	$159,048	$41,602	$117,446
Source: Federal Election Commission

==== Results ====
Republican primary results
Party	Candidate	Votes	%
Republican	Andrew Clyde (incumbent)	70,083	76.0
Republican	Sam Couvillon	11,129	12.1
Republican	Gregg Poole	11,037	12.0
Total votes		92,249	100.0

=== Democratic primary ===
==== Nominee ====
- Caitlyn Gegen, community organizer

==== Eliminated in primary ====
- Nick Alex, retired banker

==== Endorsements ====
Nick Alex

Labor unions

- Georgia AFL-CIO

==== Fundraising ====
Campaign finance reports as of March 31, 2026
Candidate	Raised	Spent	Cash on hand
Nick Alex (D)	$129,280	$78,797	$50,483
Caitlyn Gegen (D)	$15,637	$13,022	$2,615
Source: Federal Election Commission

==== Results ====
Democratic primary results
Party	Candidate	Votes	%
Democratic	Caitlyn Gegen	25,570	60.0
Democratic	Nick Alex	17,056	40.0
Total votes		42,626	100.0

=== General election ===
==== Predictions ====
Source	Ranking	As of
Decision Desk HQ	Safe R	July 14, 2026
The Cook Political Report	Solid R	February 6, 2025
Inside Elections	Solid R	March 7, 2025
Sabato's Crystal Ball	Safe R	July 15, 2025

==== Post-primary endorsements ====
Caitlyn Gegen (D)

Organizations

- National Women's Political Caucus

==== Fundraising ====
Campaign finance reports as of October 14, 2026
Candidate	Raised	Spent	Cash on hand
Andrew Clyde (R)	$738,198	$672,714	$161,469
Caitlyn Gegen (D)	$101,339	$80,202	$21,137
Source: Federal Election Commission

==== Results ====
2026 Georgia's 9th congressional district election
Party	Candidate	Votes	%	±%
Republican	Andrew Clyde (incumbent)	182,886	59.3	− 15.74
Democratic	Caitlyn Gegan	125,526	40.7	+ 15.74
Total votes				

== District 10 ==
2026 Georgia' 10th congressional district election
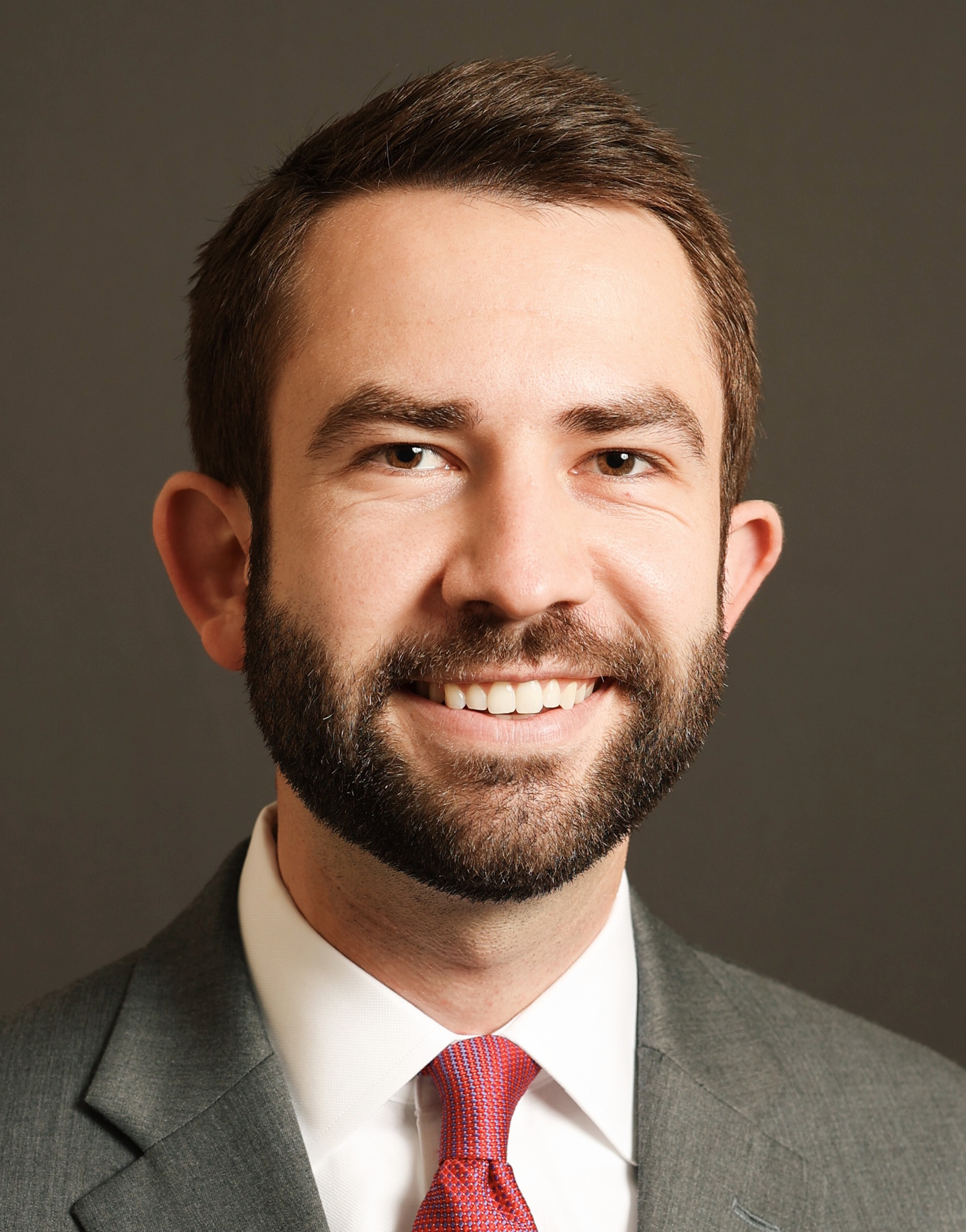

Nominee	Houston Gaines	Pamela DeLancy
Party	Republican	Democratic
Popular vote	174,274	150,907
Percentage	53.6%	46.4%
- Gaines: 50–60% 60–70% 70–80% 80–90% DeLancy: 60–70% 70–80%
U.S. Representative before election
Mike Collins
Republican
Elected U.S. Representative
Houston Gaines
Republican

The 10th district encompasses a large portion of the central-east part of the state. The incumbent is Republican Mike Collins, who was elected with 63.1% of the vote in 2024.

=== Republican primary ===
==== Nominee ====
- Houston Gaines, state representative from the 120th district (2019–present)

==== Eliminated in primary ====
- Jeffrey Baker, plumber
- Ryan Millsap, businessman

==== Declined ====
- Mike Collins, incumbent U.S. representative (running for U.S. Senate)
- Brian Strickland, state senator from the 42nd district (2018–present) (running for attorney general)

==== Endorsements ====
Houston Gaines

Executive branch officials

- Donald Trump, 45th and 47th president of the United States (2017-2021, 2025–present)

U.S. representatives

- Tom Emmer, House majority whip (2023–present) from MN-06 (2015–present)
- Mike Johnson, speaker of the House (2023–present) from LA-04 (2017–present)
- Jim Jordan, OH-04 (2007–present)
- Rich McCormick, GA-07 (2023–present)
- Steve Scalise, House majority leader (2023–present) from LA-01 (2008–present)

Organizations

- Turning Point Action
- U.S. Chamber of Commerce

==== Debates and forums ====
2026 GA-10 Republican primary debates and forums
No.	Date	Host	Moderator	Link	Participants		
P Participant A Absent N Non-invitee I Invitee W Withdrawn							
P Participant A Absent N Non-invitee I Invitee W Withdrawn					Baker	Gaines	Millsap
1	April 26, 2026	Atlanta Press Club	Pamela Kirkland	YouTube	P	P	P

==== Fundraising ====
Campaign finance reports as of March 31, 2026
Candidate	Raised	Spent	Cash on hand
Houston Gaines (R)	$1,863,007	$400,812	$1,462,195
Ryan Millsap (R)	$252,579	$244,015	$8,564
Source: Federal Election Commission

==== Results ====
Republican primary results
Party	Candidate	Votes	%
Republican	Houston Gaines	59,895	66.9
Republican	Ryan Millsap	16,149	18.0
Republican	Jeffrey Baker	13,483	15.1
Total votes		89,527	100.0

=== Democratic primary ===
==== Nominee ====
- Pamela DeLancy, nurse

==== Eliminated in primary ====
- Lexy Doherty, educational consultant and nominee for this district in 2024
- John Dority, retired engineer

==== Debates and forums ====
2026 GA-10 Democratic primary debates and forums
No.	Date	Host	Moderator	Link	Participants		
P Participant A Absent N Non-invitee I Invitee W Withdrawn							
P Participant A Absent N Non-invitee I Invitee W Withdrawn					DeLancy	Doherty	Dority
1	April 26, 2026	Atlanta Press Club	Pamela Kirkland	YouTube	P	P	P

==== Fundraising ====
Campaign finance reports as of March 31, 2026
Candidate	Raised	Spent	Cash on hand
Pamela DeLancy (D)	$8,375	$4,509	$3,865
Lexy Doherty (D)	$193,477	$150,836	$55,444
Source: Federal Election Commission

==== Results ====
Democratic primary results
Party	Candidate	Votes	%
Democratic	Pamela DeLancy	35,058	54.4
Democratic	Lexy Doherty	25,341	39.3
Democratic	John Dority	4,022	6.2
Total votes		64,421	100.0

=== General election ===
==== Predictions ====
Source	Ranking	As of
Decision Desk HQ	Likely R	October 30, 2026
The Cook Political Report	Solid R	February 6, 2025
Inside Elections	Solid R	March 7, 2025
Sabato's Crystal Ball	Safe R	July 15, 2025

==== Post-primary endorsements ====
Pamela DeLancy (D)

Organizations

- National Women's Political Caucus

==== Fundraising ====
Campaign finance reports as of October 14, 2026
Candidate	Raised	Spent	Cash on hand
Houston Gaines (R)	$2,816,583	$1,754,505	$1,062,079
Pamela DeLancy (D)	$78,670	$44,421	$24,292
Source: Federal Election Commission

==== Results ====
2026 Georgia's 10th congressional district election
Party	Candidate	Votes	%	±%
Republican	Houston Gaines			
Democratic	Pamela DeLancy			
Total votes				

== District 11 ==
2026 Georgia' 11th congressional district election
Nominee	John Cowan	Chris Harden
Party	Republican	Democratic
Popular vote	182,160	146,861
Percentage	55.4%	44.6%
- Cowan: 60–70% 70–80% Harden: 50–60%
U.S. Representative before election
Barry Loudermilk
Republican
Elected U.S. Representative
John Cowan
Republican

The 11th district is based in the northern exurbs of Atlanta. The incumbent is Republican Barry Loudermilk, who was re-elected with 65.63% of the vote in 2024.

=== Republican primary ===
==== Nominee ====
- John Cowan, neurosurgeon and candidate for the 14th district in 2020

==== Eliminated in runoff ====
- Rob Adkerson, chief of staff to U.S. representative Barry Loudermilk

==== Eliminated in primary ====
- Christopher Mora, former chair of the Pickens County Republican Party
- Uloma Kama, physician and perennial candidate
- Tricia Pridemore, Georgia Public Service Commissioner (2018–present) and candidate for this seat in 2014

==== Withdrawn ====
- John Hobbs, attorney (remained on ballot)
- Lisa Carlquist, entrepreneur (endorsed Adkerson, remained on ballot)

==== Declined ====
- Brandon Beach, Treasurer of the United States (2025–present) and former state senator from the 21st district (2013–2025)
- Michael Caldwell, mayor of Woodstock (2022–present) and former state representative from the 20th district (2013–2021) (endorsed Adkerson)
- Barry Loudermilk, incumbent U.S. representative (endorsed Adkerson)

==== Endorsements ====
Rob Adkerson

U.S. representatives

- Barry Loudermilk, GA-11 (2015–present)
- Bob Barr, former GA-07 (1995–2003)

State legislators

- Jason Anavitarte, Georgia Senate majority leader (2025-present) from the 31st district (2021-present)

Local officials

- Michael Caldwell, mayor of Woodstock (2022–present)

Individuals

- Lisa Carlquist, former candidate for this district
John Cowan

U.S. representatives

- Andy Harris, MD-01 (2011–present)
Tricia Pridemore

U.S. representatives

- Kat Cammack, FL-03 (2021–present)
- Newt Gingrich, former speaker of the House (1995–1999) from GA-06 (1979–1999)

Statewide officials

- Nathan Deal, former governor of Georgia (2011–2019) and former GA-09 (1993–2010)
Barry Loudermilk (declined)

Organizations

- AIPAC

==== Fundraising ====
Campaign finance reports as of March 31, 2026
Candidate	Raised	Spent	Cash on hand
Rob Adkerson (R)	$123,832	$13,934	$109,898
John Hobbs (R)	$37,480	$7,674	$29,805
Lisa Carlquist (R)	$223,043	$83,618	$139,425
John Cowan (R)	$1,739,444	$369,686	$1,369,757
Uloma Kama (R)	$11,347	$10,799	$1,095
William Kelly (R)	$35,801	$35,801	$0
Chris Mora (R)	$25,842	$18,725	$7,116
Tricia Pridemore (R)	$431,752	$32,255	$399,496
Source: Federal Election Commission

==== Results ====
Republican primary results
Party	Candidate	Votes	%
Republican	John Cowan	34,150	42.6
Republican	Rob Adkerson	17,408	21.7
Republican	Tricia Pridemore	15,200	19.0
Republican	John Hobbs	5,086	6.3
Republican	Christopher Mora	4,121	5.1
Republican	Lisa Carlquist	3,161	3.9
Republican	Uloma Kama	1,039	1.3
Total votes		80,165	100.0

==== Runoff results ====
Republican primary runoff results
Party	Candidate	Votes	%
Republican	John Cowan	44,799	65.0
Republican	Rob Adkerson	24,140	35.0
Total votes		68,939	100.0

=== Democratic primary ===
==== Nominee ====
- Chris Harden, attorney

==== Eliminated in primary ====
- Barry Wolfert, real estate broker

==== Endorsements ====
Chris Harden

Labor unions

- Georgia AFL-CIO

==== Fundraising ====
Campaign finance reports as of March 31, 2026
Candidate	Raised	Spent	Cash on hand
Chris Harden (D)	$49,635	$32,941	$2,791
Barry Wolfert (D)	$37,403	$19,176	$18,226
Source: Federal Election Commission

==== Results ====
Democratic primary results
Party	Candidate	Votes	%
Democratic	Chris Harden	39,204	74.8
Democratic	Barry Wolfert	13,230	25.2
Total votes		52,434	100.0

=== Independents ===
==== Declared ====
- Natalie Richoz, disabled nurse

=== General election ===
==== Predictions ====
Source	Ranking	As of
Decision Desk HQ	Safe R	July 14, 2026
The Cook Political Report	Solid R	February 6, 2025
Inside Elections	Solid R	March 7, 2025
Sabato's Crystal Ball	Safe R	July 15, 2025

==== Post-primary endorsements ====
Chris Harden (D)

Organizations

- Reproductive Freedom for All

==== Fundraising ====
Campaign finance reports as of October 14, 2026
Candidate	Raised	Spent	Cash on hand
John Cowan (R)	$2,824,606	$2,678,788	$145,818
Chris Harden (D)	$139,283	$130,574	$8,709
Source: Federal Election Commission

==== Polling ====
Poll source	Date(s) administered	Sample size	Margin of error	John Cowan (R)	Chris Harden (D)	Undecided
Miller Consulting Services (Note: Poll sponsored by Harden's campaign)	August 31 – September 11, 2026	402 (LV)	± 4.98%	40%	42%	16%

Hypothetical polling

Generic Republican vs. generic Democrat

Poll source	Date(s) administered	Sample size	Margin of error	Generic Republican	Generic Democrat	Undecided
Miller Consulting Services	August 31 – September 11, 2026	402 (LV)	± 4.98%	48%	45%	8%

==== Results ====
2026 Georgia's 11th congressional district election
Party	Candidate	Votes	%	±%
Republican	John Cowan			
Democratic	Chris Harden			
Total votes				

== District 12 ==
2026 Georgia' 12th congressional district election
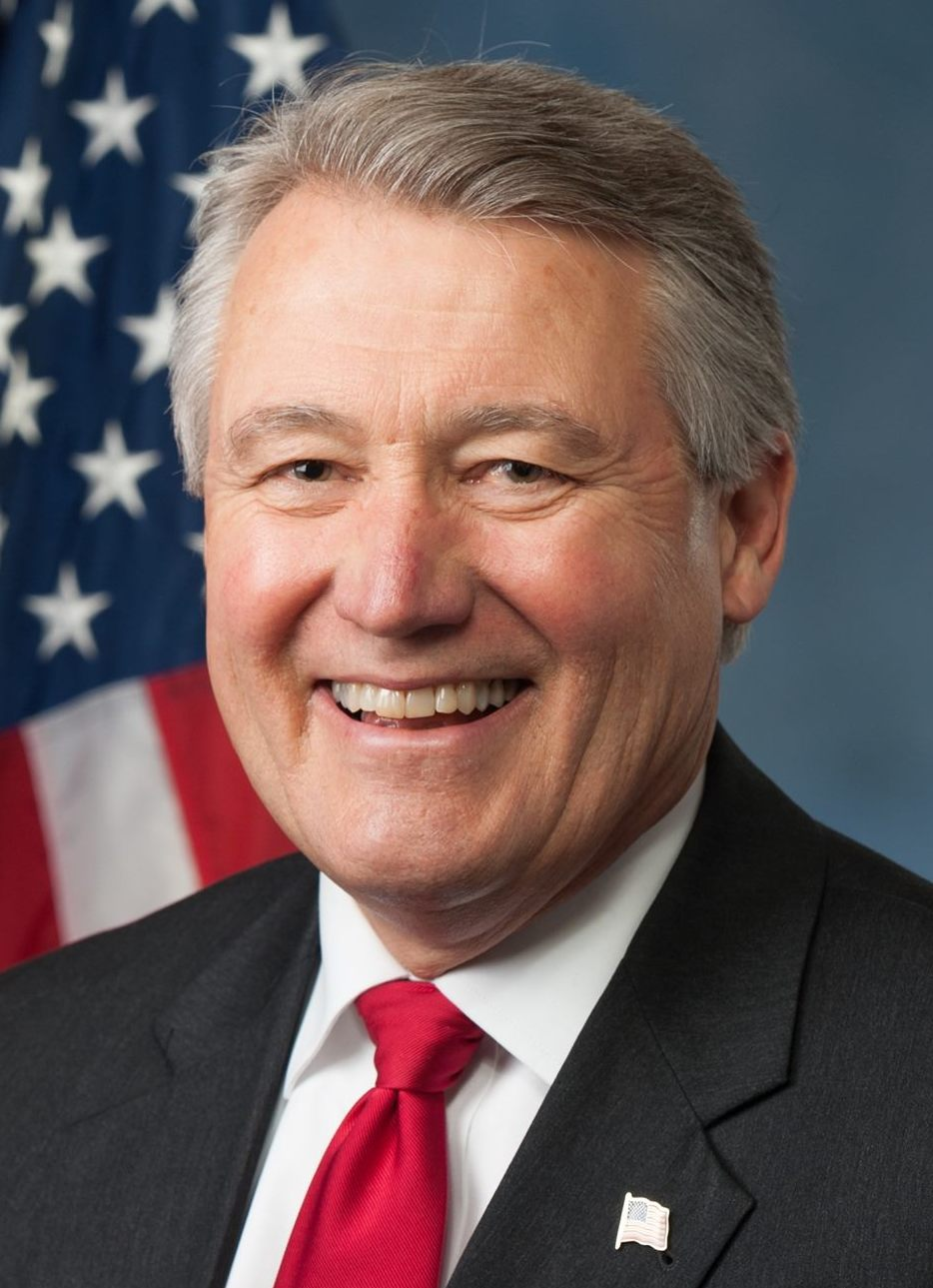

Nominee	Rick Allen	Ceretta Smith
Party	Republican	Democratic
Popular vote	140,869	129,582
Percentage	52.1%	47.9%
- Allen: 50–60% 60–70% 70–80% 90–100% Smith: 50–60% 70–80%
U.S. Representative before election
Rick Allen
Republican
Elected U.S. Representative
Rick Allen
Republican

The 12th district is based in the central-east part of the state, surrounding Augusta. The incumbent is Republican Rick Allen, who was re-elected with 60.3% of the vote in 2024.

=== Republican primary ===
==== Nominee ====
- Rick Allen, incumbent U.S. Representative

==== Eliminated in primary ====
- Tori Branum, behavioral therapist

==== Endorsements ====
Rick Allen

Executive branch officials

- Donald Trump, 45th and 47th president of the United States (2017–2021, 2025–present)

Organizations

- AIPAC

==== Fundraising ====
Campaign finance reports as of March 31, 2026
Candidate	Raised	Spent	Cash on hand
Rick Allen (R)	$804,619	$709,572	$1,270,004
Tori Branum (R)	$33,828	$27,007	$6,797
Source: Federal Election Commission

==== Results ====
Republican primary results
Party	Candidate	Votes	%
Republican	Rick Allen (incumbent)	59,576	83.4
Republican	Tori Branum	11,884	16.6
Total votes		71,460	100.0

=== Democratic primary ===
==== Nominee ====
- Ceretta Smith, Grovetown city councilor

==== Eliminated in runoff ====
- Traci George, educator

==== Eliminated in primary ====
- Tracell Peace-Nichols, attorney
- Chris Stephens, former police officer
- Brianna Woodson, mental health counselor

==== Endorsements ====
Ceretta Smith
- Georgia AFL-CIO
- American Federation of Government Employees

==== Fundraising ====
Campaign finance reports as of May 27, 2026
Candidate	Raised	Spent	Cash on hand
Tracell Peace-Nichols (D)	$21,313	$19,723	$1,590
Ceretta Smith (D)	$22,756	$20,898	$1,956
Chris Stephens (D)	$23,217	$19,988	$3,229
Brianna Woodson (D)	$26,673	$24,536	$7,030
Source: Federal Election Commission

==== Results ====
Democratic primary results
Party	Candidate	Votes	%
Democratic	Ceretta Smith	20,112	32.8
Democratic	Traci George	16,334	26.7
Democratic	Brianna Woodson	11,456	18.7
Democratic	Tracell Peace-Nichols	6,843	11.2
Democratic	Chris Stephens	6,539	10.7
Total votes		61,284	100.0

==== Runoff results ====
Democratic primary runoff results
Party	Candidate	Votes	%
Democratic	Ceretta Smith	16,823	55.8
Democratic	Traci George	13,331	44.2
Total votes		30,154	100.0

=== General election ===
==== Predictions ====
Source	Ranking	As of
Decision Desk HQ	Likely R	July 14, 2026
The Cook Political Report	Solid R	February 6, 2025
Inside Elections	Solid R	March 7, 2025
Sabato's Crystal Ball	Safe R	July 15, 2025

==== Post-primary endorsements ====
Rick Allen (R)

Organizations

- U.S. Chamber of Commerce

==== Fundraising ====
Campaign finance reports as of October 14, 2026
Candidate	Raised	Spent	Cash on hand
Rick Allen (R)	$1,265,488	$975,580	$1,464,865
Ceretta Smith (D)	$47,693	$35,472	$12,318
Source: Federal Election Commission

==== Results ====
2026 Georgia's 12th congressional district election
Party	Candidate	Votes	%	±%
Republican	Rick Allen (incumbent)			
Democratic	Ceretta Smith			
Total votes				

== District 13 ==
2026 Georgia' 13th congressional district election
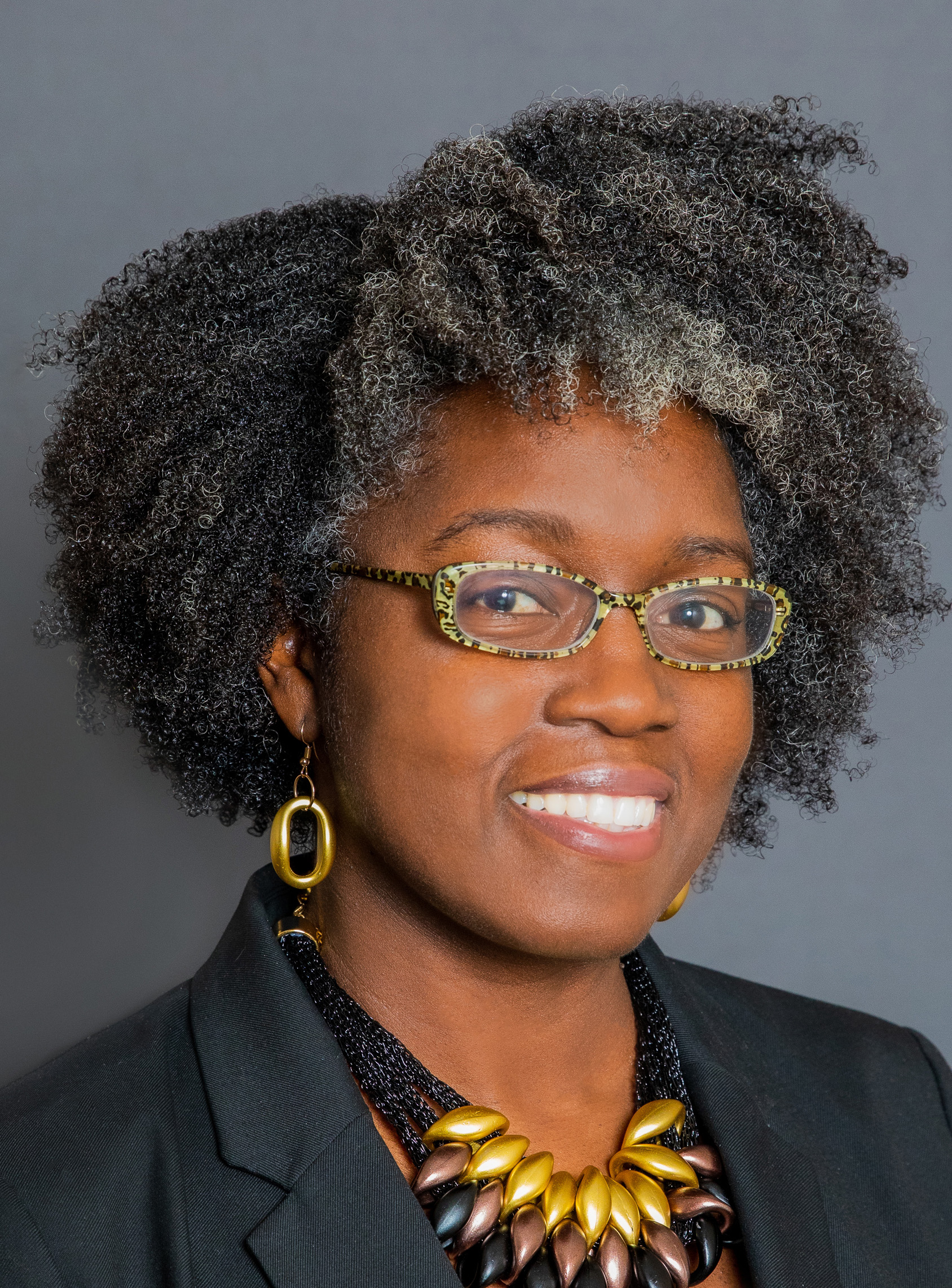

Nominee	Jasmine Clark	Jonathan Chavez
Party	Democratic	Republican
Popular vote	247,937	62,650
Percentage	79.8%	20.2%
- Clark: 70–80% 80–90% 90–100%
U.S. Representative before election
Everton Blair
Democratic
Elected U.S. Representative
Jasmine Clark
Democratic

The 13th district is based in the southwest suburbs and exurbs of Atlanta. The incumbent is Democrat Everton Blair who was elected in a special election after congressman David Scott died in April 2026. Scott was re-elected with 71.8% of the vote in 2024 and was running for re-election until his death in April 2026.

Scott faced criticism from fellow Democrats due to his age; he would have been 81 years old at the beginning of the next Congress, as well as reports from his voting record revealing that he had not cast a single vote in the last six election cycles, including the 2024 United States presidential election. Scott faced several primary challengers, but stated he was running for re-election to a 13th term in Congress. Scott died on April 22, 2026. His name remained on the Democratic primary ballot, but votes for him were not counted in the official tally.

=== Democratic primary ===
==== Nominee ====
- Jasmine Clark, state representative from the 108th district (2019–present)

==== Eliminated in primary ====
- Everton Blair, former chair of the Gwinnett County Board of Education and candidate for superintendent of schools in 2022
- Jeff Fauntleroy, ministry and law enforcement
- Emanuel Jones, state senator from the 10th district (2005–present)
- Heavenly Kimes, dentist and Married to Medicine cast member
- Joe Lester, dentist

==== Withdrawn ====
- Jonathan Bonner, project manager (running for State House)
- Ron McKenzie, business attorney (endorsed Blair)
- David Scott, former U.S. Representative (2003–2026) (died April 22, 2026)

==== Endorsements ====
Everton Blair

Statewide officials

- Deval Patrick, former governor of Massachusetts (2007–2015)

Individuals

- Ron McKenzie, business attorney and former candidate for this seat

Organizations

- LGBTQ+ Victory Fund
- Our Revolution
- Track AIPAC
Jasmine Clark

Individuals

- Mary Trump, niece of Donald Trump and sister of Fred Trump III
- Alex Vindman, retired Army Col. and witness in the first impeachment of Donald Trump and candidate for the 2026 U.S. Senate

Labor unions

- American Federation of Government Employees

Organizations

- 314 Action
- Indivisible
- J Street PAC
- MoveOn
- Planned Parenthood Action Fund (since June)
- Vote Mama
Emanuel Jones

Federal officials

- Andrew Young, former U.S. ambassador to the UN (1977–1979) and former mayor of Atlanta (1982–1990)
Heavenly Kimes

State legislators

- Donna McLeod, former state representative from the 105th district (2019–2023)

Local officials

- Fani Willis, Fulton County district attorney (2021–present)

Individuals

- Kandi Burruss, singer-songwriter
- Ben Crump, civil rights attorney
- Knowa De Baraso, political commentator and social media personality
David Scott (deceased)

Labor unions

- Georgia AFL-CIO
- United Auto Workers

Organizations

- AIPAC
- Democratic Majority for Israel
- Planned Parenthood Action Fund

==== Fundraising ====
Italics indicate a withdrawn candidate.

Campaign finance reports as of March 31, 2026
Candidate	Raised	Spent	Cash on hand
Everton Blair (D)	$644,025	$486,993	$157,032
Jonathan Bonner (D) (Note: As last reported on June 30, 2025)	$8,303	$7,800	$503
Jasmine Clark (D)	$1,072,632	$590,234	$482,398
Jeff Fauntleroy (D)	$24,155 (Note: $20,000 of this total was self-funded by Fauntleroy)	$16,198	$0
Emanuel Jones (D)	$385,572 (Note: $145,500 of this total was self-funded by Jones)	$206,455	$179,116
Heavenly Kimes (D)	$536,733 (Note: $250,000 of this total was self-funded by Kimes)	$394,285	$142,447
Joe Lester (D)	$40,409	$38,420	$1,989
Ron McKenzie (D)	$47,355	$47,301	$53
Carlos Moore (D)	$105,381	$52,539	$0
David Scott (D) (Note: Deceased)	$515,601 (Note: $173,291 of this total was self-funded by Scott)	$519,010	$171,115
Pierre Whatley (D)	$65,888	$62,528	$3,359
Source: Federal Election Commission

==== Polling ====
Poll source	Date(s) administered	Sample size	Margin of error	Everton Blair	Jasmine Clark	Emanuel Jones	Heavenly Kimes	David Scott	Other	Undecided
	April 22, 2026	David Scott dies								
Z to A Research (D) (Note: Poll sponsored by Clark's campaign)	March 10–13, 2026	522 (LV)	± 4.3%	6%	30%	8%	10%	31%	2% (Note: Jeff Fauntleroy and Joe Lester with 1%)	13%

==== Results ====
Democratic primary results
Party	Candidate	Votes	%
Democratic	Jasmine Clark	61,504	56.1
Democratic	Heavenly Kimes	23,537	21.5
Democratic	Everton Blair	12,733	11.6
Democratic	Emanuel Jones	8,204	7.5
Democratic	Joe Lester	2,046	1.9
Democratic	Jeff Fauntleroy	1,557	1.4
Total votes		109,581	100.0

=== Republican primary ===
==== Nominee ====
- Jonathan Chavez, former chairman of the Rockdale County Republican Party

==== Results ====
Republican primary results
Party	Candidate	Votes	%
Republican	Jonathan Chavez	25,547	100.0
Total votes		25,547	100.0

=== Independents ===
==== Candidates ====
===== Declined =====
- Marcye Scott, computer consultant, daughter of former representative David Scott, and Democratic candidate for this seat in the July-August special election (Democratic)

=== General election ===
==== Predictions ====
Source	Ranking	As of
Decision Desk HQ	Safe D	July 14, 2026
The Cook Political Report	Solid D	February 6, 2025
Inside Elections	Solid D	March 7, 2025
Sabato's Crystal Ball	Safe D	July 15, 2025

==== Post-primary endorsements ====
Jasmine Clark (D)

Labor unions

- National Education Association

Organizations

- Giffords
- Reproductive Freedom for All

==== Fundraising ====
Campaign finance reports as of October 14, 2026
Candidate	Raised	Spent	Cash on hand
Jasmine Clark (D)	$2,386,955	$2,043,223	$343,732
Jonathan Chavez (R)	$0	$0	$0
Source: Federal Election Commission

==== Results ====
2026 Georgia's 13th congressional district election
Party	Candidate	Votes	%	±%
Democratic	Jasmine Clark			
Republican	Jonathan Chavez			
Total votes				

== District 14 ==
2026 Georgia' 14th congressional district election
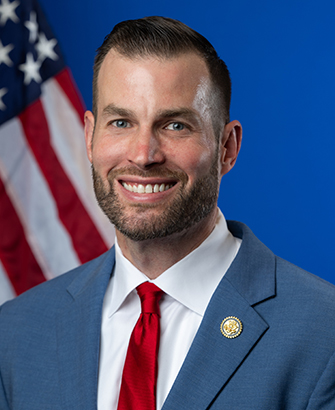

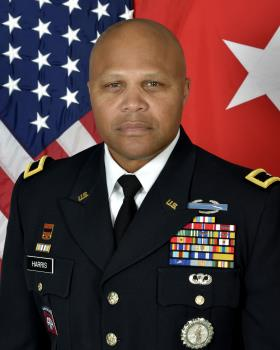
Nominee	Clay Fuller	Shawn Harris
Party	Republican	Democratic
Popular vote	168,752	118,336
Percentage	58.8%	41.2%
- Fuller: 50–60% 60–70% 70–80% Harris: 50–60%
Representative before election
Clay Fuller
Republican
Elected Representative
Clay Fuller
Republican

The 14th district is based in the northwest corner of the state. Republican Marjorie Taylor Greene was re-elected with 64.4% of the vote in 2024, but she resigned on January 5, 2026.

A special election was held with district attorney Clay Fuller winning the election in a runoff and serving the remainder of the term.

=== Republican primary ===
==== Nominee ====
- Clay Fuller, incumbent U.S. Representative

==== Eliminated in primary ====
- Star Black, former Federal Emergency Management Agency official
- Reagan Box, horse trainer
- Timothy Brown, risk engineer
- Tom Gray, pastor and candidate for Georgia's 36th House of Representatives district in 2018
- Nicky Lama, Dalton city councilmember
- Colton Moore, state senator from the 53rd district (2023–2026)
- Brian Stover, former Paulding County commissioner

==== Withdrawn ====
- Eric Cunningham, sales executive and candidate for this district in 2022
- Marjorie Taylor Greene, former U.S. representative
- Jim Tully, congressional staffer and chairman of the 14th District Republican Party

==== Endorsements ====
Marjorie Taylor Greene

Executive branch officials

- ~~Donald Trump, 45th and 47th president of the United States (2017–2021, 2025–present)~~ (endorsement rescinded) (Note: Trump withdrew his endorsement of Greene after she criticized his handling of the Epstein files, tariffs, and foreign policy.)

==== Fundraising ====
Campaign finance reports as of March 31, 2026
Candidate	Raised	Spent	Cash on hand
Star Black (R)	$84,346	$29,203	$55,142
Reagan Box (R)	$82,041	$90,345	$0
James Brown (R)	$9,879	$3,600	$1,492
Timothy Brown (R)	$13,050	$6,837	$6,212
Jared Craig (R)	$21,000	$20,905	$94
Jefferson Criswell (R)	$2,505	$2,505	$0
Eric Cunningham (R)	$16,075	$16,075	$0
Clay Fuller (R)	$1,436,947	$1,291,573	$145,373
Tom Gray (R)	$327,582	$323,451	$4,131
Christian Hurd (R)	$21,563	$21,563	$0
Nicky Lama (R)	$380,341	$358,991	$21,349
Colton Moore (R)	$439,776	$413,209	$26,567
Linvel Risner (R)	$1,930	$1,325	$605
Brian Stover (R)	$1,119,341	$1,116,423	$2,917
Megahn Strickland (R)	$14,580	$2,684	$0
Jim Tully (R)	$68,505	$68,505	$0
Jenna Turnipseed (R)	$15,425	$13,345	$2,080
Source: Federal Election Commission

==== Results ====
Republican primary results
Party	Candidate	Votes	%
Republican	Clay Fuller (incumbent)	66,888	81.3
Republican	Colton Moore	5,508	6.7
Republican	Brian Stover	3,191	3.9
Republican	Tom Gray	2,044	2.5
Republican	Timothy Brown	1,489	1.8
Republican	Star Black	1,406	1.7
Republican	Nicky Lama	1,220	1.5
Republican	Reagan Box	560	0.7
Total votes		82,306	100.0

=== Democratic primary ===
==== Nominee ====
- Shawn Harris, cattleman, retired brigadier general, and nominee for this district in 2024

==== Withdrawn ====
- Clarence Blalock, GIS contractor and candidate for this district in 2024 (running for Labor Commissioner, endorsed Harris)

==== Endorsements ====
Shawn Harris

Labor unions

- Georgia AFL-CIO

==== Fundraising ====
Campaign finance reports as of March 31, 2026
Candidate	Raised	Spent	Cash on hand
Clarence Blalock (D)	$17,356	$16,690	$0
Shawn Harris (D)	$7,163,864	$6,921,018	$242,845
Source: Federal Election Commission

==== Results ====
Democratic primary results
Party	Candidate	Votes	%
Democratic	Shawn Harris	43,067	100.0
Total votes		43,067	100.0

=== Libertarian party ===
==== Disqualified ====
- Andrew Underwood, candidate for Georgia's 2nd House of Representatives district in 2022 and for this district in the 2026 special election

==== Fundraising ====
Campaign finance reports as of March 31, 2026
Candidate	Raised	Spent	Cash on hand
Andrew Underwood (L)	$2,987	$2,712	$275

=== Independent ===
==== Withdrawn ====
- Rob Ruszkowski, small business owner

==== Fundraising ====
Campaign finance reports as of October 14, 2026
Candidate	Raised	Spent	Cash on hand
Rob Ruszkowski (I)	$9,703	$9,491	$213

=== General election ===
==== Predictions ====
Source	Ranking	As of
Decision Desk HQ	Safe R	July 14, 2026
The Cook Political Report	Solid R	February 6, 2025
Inside Elections	Solid R	March 7, 2025
Sabato's Crystal Ball	Safe R	July 15, 2025

==== Fundraising ====
Campaign finance reports as of October 14, 2026
Candidate	Raised	Spent	Cash on hand
Clay Fuller (R)	$2,160,464	$1,956,150	$204,314
Shawn Harris (D)	$8,418,045	$8,358,733	$59,313
Source: Federal Election Commission

==== Results ====
2026 Georgia's 14th congressional district election
Party	Candidate	Votes	%	±%
Republican	Clay Fuller (incumbent)			
Democratic	Shawn Harris			
Total votes				

== Notes ==
Partisan clients
