= Cas Robinson =

American politician (1935–2024)

Member of the Georgia House of Representatives from the 58th district
- In office 1977–1987

Personal details
- Born: August 31, 1935 Fayette County, Alabama, U.S.
- Died: March 17, 2024 (aged 88)
- Spouse: Mary Louise Green
- Children: 4
- Occupation: Politician, Pastor

Cas M. Robinson (August 31, 1935 – March 17, 2024) was an American politician in the state of Georgia.

He was an alumnus of the University of Alabama and Louisville Presbyterian Theological Seminary. He worked as a banker. He served in the Georgia House of Representatives from 1977 to 1987. He was then appointed to the Georgia Public Service Commission in 1987 and won the 1988 special election for the seat, but was defeated in the Democratic primary for the seat in 1992. Robinson died on March 17, 2024, at the age of 88.
