= Jim Kingston =

American politician (born 1990)

Member-elect of the U.S. House of Representatives from Georgia's 1st district
- Assuming office January 3, 2027
- Succeeding: Buddy Carter

Personal details
- Born: James Morris Kingston; 1990 (age 35–36)
- Party: Republican
- Spouse: Meredith Baird (m. 2026)
- Relatives: Jack Kingston (father)
- Education: University of Georgia (attended)
- Website: Campaign website

James Morris Kingston (born 1990) is an American insurance broker and politician from Georgia. He is a member of the Republican Party and the member-elect for Georgia's 1st congressional district in the United States House of Representatives.

== Early life and education ==
James Morris Kingston was born in 1990 and raised in Savannah, Georgia. He is the youngest of four children born to former Congressman Jack Kingston. He attended Saint Andrew's School, where he was team captain on the football and baseball teams and was elected class president. While he attended the University of Georgia and studied economics, he did not graduate with a degree. He worked on his father's 2014 campaign for the U.S Senate. He works as an insurance broker.

== Political career ==
In June 2025, after Buddy Carter, the member of the U.S. House of Representatives for Georgia's 1st congressional district, announced that he would run for the U.S. Senate, Kingston announced his campaign to succeed Carter in the 2026 election. He received the endorsements of the United States Chamber of Commerce, the Club for Growth, and Donald Trump, and was assisted in rallies by Jim Jordan. Kingston won the Republican primary election on May 19 and won the November general election against Democrat Amanda Hollowell.

== Personal life ==
Kingston and his wife, Meredith, were married in January 2026.

U.S. House of Representatives
Preceded by Buddy Carter	Member of the U.S. House of Representatives from Georgia's 1st congressional district Taking office 2027	Elect
