= David Burgess (American politician) =

American politician

Member of the Georgia Public Service Commission
- In office April 1999 – January 2007
- Preceded by: Dave Baker
- Succeeded by: Chuck Eaton

Chairman of the Georgia Public Service Commission
- In office 2002–2004

Personal details
- Party: Democratic
- Education: Georgia Institute of Technology (BS)
- Profession: Electrical engineer, public utilities engineer

David Burgess is an American former politician who served on the Georgia Public Service Commission (PSC) from 1999 to 2007. He was the first Black member of the commission since its establishment in 1879.

Burgess graduated from Georgia Tech in 1981 with a Bachelor of Science degree in electrical engineering, and worked as a public utilities engineer at the PSC. Rising through the ranks over the years, Burgess served as Director of Rates and Tariffs from 1988 until 1997, and from 1997 to 1999 as the Director of the commission's Telecommunications Unit. He was selected by Governor Roy Barnes in April 1999 to serve out the remaining term of Dave Baker, and subsequently won election to a full term in November 2000. He ascended to the role of chairman of the PSC in 2002. The last (and currently most recent, as of 2022) Democratic incumbent on the commission, he was defeated in his bid for a second full term in 2006 by Republican candidate Chuck Eaton. Burgess was the last African American on the PSC until the appointment of Republican candidate Fitz Johnson in July 2021, as well as the last Democrat to sit on the PSC until the elections of Alicia Johnson and Peter Hubbard in the 2025 special election.
