= Earleen Sizemore =

American politician (1938–2014)

Member of the Georgia House of Representatives from the 136th district
- In office 1975–1989

Member of the Georgia Public Service Commission
- In office 2002 – January 2003
- Preceded by: Bob Durden
- Succeeded by: Doug Everett

Personal details
- Born: July 29, 1938 Worth County, Georgia, U.S.
- Died: August 20, 2014 (aged 76)
- Party: Democratic
- Spouse: Cortez B. Sizemore
- Children: 3
- Education: Georgia Southern University; University of Georgia

Earleen Sizemore (July 29, 1938 – August 20, 2014) was an American politician. She served as a Democratic member for the 136th district of the Georgia House of Representatives.

== Life and career ==
Sizemore was born in Worth County, Georgia. She attended Georgia Southern University and the University of Georgia.

Sizemore served in the Georgia House of Representatives from 1975 to 1989.

She served as the Superintendent of Worth County Schools from 1989 to 1993. In 2002, she was appointed to the Public Service Commission by Gov. Roy Barnes, but she lost reelection that November.

Sizemore died in August 2014, at the age of 76.
