= Shelia Edwards =

American politician

Member-elect of the Georgia Public Service Commission from the 5th district
- Assuming office January 1, 2027
- Governor: Keisha Lance Bottoms (elect)
- Succeeding: Stan Wise

Personal details
- Party: Democratic

Shelia Edwards is an American politician, and businesswoman who is currently a member-elect of the Georgia Public Service Commission (PSC). A member of the Democratic Party of Georgia, Edwards first ran for the position in 2022, but was forced to end her campaign when the elections were cancelled by a court. She ran again in 2026 and defeated her Republican opponent.

== Career ==
=== Georgia Public Service Commission ===
Edwards first ran for a seat on the PSC in 2022, and won the Democratic primary. The 2022 elections were postponed due to a court ruling, and were not held again until 2025.

Edwards chose to run in 2026, to represent the 5th district. PSC elections in Georgia are held statewide, regardless of district. Edwards won the Democratic primary outright on May 19. She defeated Josh Tolbert, the Republican nominee, on November 3rd with 55% of the vote. With her victory, Democrats flipped control of the commission for the first time in 30 years.
