= Tricia Pridemore =

American politician

Member of the Georgia Public Service Commission from the 5th district
- In office February 21, 2018 – September 4, 2026
- Governor: Nathan Deal; Brian Kemp
- Preceded by: Stan Wise
- Succeeded by: Stan Wise

Personal details
- Party: Republican
- Education: Kennesaw State University (BA)

Tricia Pridemore is an American politician. A Republican, Pridemore was appointed to the Georgia Public Service Commission by Governor Nathan Deal on February 21, 2018, to succeed Stan Wise in Seat 5, and was elected to a full term on November 6, 2018. Although eligible, Pridemore declined to run for re-election to Seat 5 in the 2026 Georgia Public Service Commission election, instead qualifying to run for Georgia's 11th congressional district. In the subsequent Republican primary, she failed to make it to the runoff.

Political offices
Preceded by Stan Wise	Member of the Georgia Public Service Commission from the 5th district 2018–2026	Succeeded by Stan Wise
