= Peter Hubbard =

American politician

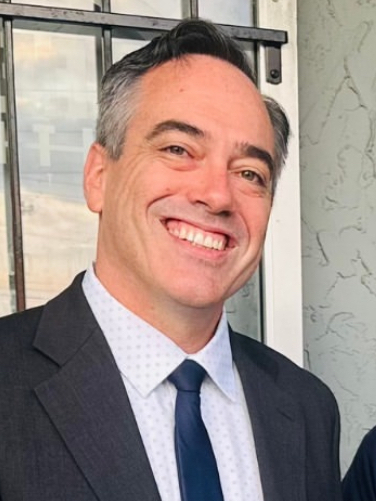

Member of the Georgia Public Service Commission from the 3rd district
- Incumbent
- Assumed office January 1, 2026
- Governor: Brian Kemp; Keisha Lance Bottoms (elect)
- Preceded by: Fitz Johnson

Personal details
- Born: Peter Jacob Hubbard; 1979 or 1980 (age 46–47) Akron, Ohio, U.S.
- Party: Democratic
- Education: University of Memphis (BS); Johns Hopkins University (MA)
- Website: Campaign website

Peter Jacob Hubbard (born 1979) is an American politician and clean energy advocate who has served as a member of the Georgia Public Service Commission (PSC) since 2026. A member of the Democratic Party, he was first elected in a 2025 special election.

== Early life and education ==
Hubbard was born in Akron, Ohio. He attended the University of Memphis, where he received two Bachelors of Science degrees in physics and mathematics. While at the University of Memphis, Hubbard worked in the Solar Physics Laboratory and co-authored a peer-reviewed paper on solar coronal loops. He then attended Johns Hopkins University, where he received a master's degree in international affairs with specializations in Economics as well as Energy, Resources & Environment.

== Career ==
Hubbard founded the Georgia Center for Energy Solutions in 2019 as a nonprofit advocating for clean energy and lower power bills. He attended various PSC meetings, where he spoke about those issues in front of commissioners.

=== Public Service Commission ===
==== Elections ====
===== 2025 =====
Hubbard ran for a seat on the PSC in a 2025 special election. In a low turnout election, he advanced to a Democratic primary runoff on June 17. He defeated Keisha Waites to win the Democratic nomination in the runoff election with 58% of the vote. In October, he participated in a debate hosted by the Atlanta Press Club. Fitz Johnson, his Republican opponent, did not accept the debate invitation. He focused on reaching out to individual households, informing Georgia Power customers about what the PSC does, and why they should vote for both him and Alicia Johnson, the Democratic nominee for the 2nd district. He defeated incumbent Fitz Johnson on November 4, 2025 with nearly 63% of the vote.

===== 2026 =====
Hubbard qualified to run for re-election in 2026. No candidates filed to run against him in the primary election, held on May 19. In a general election rematch, he defeated Johnson with 56% of the vote on November 3.

==== Tenure ====
Upon taking office, Hubbard and Alicia Johnson became the first Democrats on the Commission since David Burgess lost re-election in 2006. Voting in the political minority, Hubbard voted with Johnson to reconsider Georgia Power's energy budget. The vote fell along party lines and failed 3-2.

== Personal life ==
Hubbard met his wife during their Peace Corps service in Morocco in 2004. They have two children.

Political offices
Preceded by Fitz Johnson	Member of the Georgia Public Service Commission from the 3rd district 2026–present	Incumbent
