= Fitz Johnson =

American businessman and public official

Member of the Georgia Public Service Commission from the 3rd district
- In office August 26, 2021 – January 1, 2026
- Governor: Brian Kemp
- Preceded by: Chuck Eaton
- Succeeded by: Peter Hubbard

Personal details
- Born: Terrell Fitz Johnson; October 9, 1963 (age 63)
- Party: Republican
- Spouse: Suzann Wilcox
- Children: 4
- Education: The Citadel (BS); Troy State University (MS); University of Kentucky (JD)

Military service
- Allegiance: United States
- Branch/service: United States Army
- Years of service: 1981–2002
- Rank: Major
- Unit: U.S. Army Reserve

Medal record

Collegiate Wrestling

Representing the Citadel Bulldogs

SoCon Championships
Gold medal – first place	1982 Lexington	134 lb

Terrell Fitz Johnson (October 9, 1963) is an American soldier, businessman, and public official from Georgia. Appointed by Governor Brian Kemp in July 2021, he became the second African American and first black Republican to serve on the Georgia Public Service Commission. He is a former owner of the Atlanta Beat soccer club.

== Early life and education ==
Johnson was born on October 9, 1963. He attended The Citadel on a wrestling scholarship, and he won the NCAA's Southern Conference title as a freshman in 1982. A knee injury during his sophomore year ended Johnson's wrestling career. He was inducted into the Georgia Chapter of the National Wrestling Hall of Fame in 2021.

Johnson received his BS in education from The Citadel in 1985, his MS in education from Troy University in 1991, and his JD from the University of Kentucky College of Law in 1998.

== Military and business careers ==
Johnson enlisted in the United States Army in 1981, became a commissioned officer in 1985, and served on active duty from 1985 to 1995 and in the U.S. Army Reserve from 1995 to 2002. He retired at the rank of major. From 1998 to 2008, Johnson worked as owner and operator of Eagle Group International, a $175 million privately held company that sold logistics, information technology, training, and healthcare services to the U.S. Defense Department and was later acquired by Lockheed Martin. He later became CEO and owner of ASID Group International. In 2024, Johnson, along with his wife Suzanne Wilcox and business partners Brennen and Emily Matthews, opened Drafty Dane Park & Pint, an off-leash dog park and bar, in Marietta, Georgia.

== Political career ==
Johnson ran unsuccessfully for the Cobb County Commission in 2020 and state school superintendent in 2014. On July 21, 2021, Governor Brian Kemp appointed him to the Georgia Public Service Commission, filling the unexpired term of District 3 Commissioner Chuck Eaton, who had resigned to become a Georgia Superior Courts judge. Sworn in on August 26, 2021, Johnson became the second African American, and the first African-American Republican, to serve as a Georgia public-service commissioner. He chaired the commission's telecommunications committee until September 2023, and he subsequently chaired the energy committee. In 2023, the National Association of Regulatory Utility Commissioners appointed him chair of the Task Force on Evolving Gas Infrastructure Planning.

Johnson ran for a full term on the commission, winning the Republican primary in May 2022. However, in August 2022, Judge Steven D. Grimberg of the United States District Court for the Northern District of Georgia ruled in favor of black voters that had sued in 2020 to strike down at-large elections used to elect Public Service Commissioners, alleging that the system diluted the black vote and thus violated the Voting Rights Act of 1965. The State of Georgia appealed the ruling, and the 11th Circuit Court of Appeals overturned Grimberg's decision. The plaintiffs then appealed to the U.S. Supreme Court, which reversed the reversal and returned the case to the circuit court for review. As of November 2, 2023, the circuit court has not rendered a decision. Until an election is held, Johnson and fellow commissioner Tim Echols will remain in office, even though Johnson's term expired on December 31, 2022.

Johnson has served on the boards of the State Charter Schools Commission, Wellstar Health System, Life University, the Kennesaw State University Foundation, the Cumberland Counseling Center, and the Women's Professional Soccer League. He is a former owner of the Atlanta Beat (WPS) professional soccer team from 2008 to 2011 and has supported fundraising and construction of Kennesaw State University's Fifth Third Stadium.

In a 2025 special election, Johnson was defeated by Democrat Peter Hubbard.

== Personal life ==
Johnson is married to Suzann Wilcox and has four children and six grandchildren.

In 2021, Johnson was honored with the Outstanding American award by the National Wrestling Hall of Fame and Museum.

Political offices
Preceded by Chuck Eaton	Member of the Georgia Public Service Commission from the 3rd district 2021–2026	Succeeded by Peter Hubbard
