= Georgia Public Service Commission =

Statutory organ of the state government of Georgia

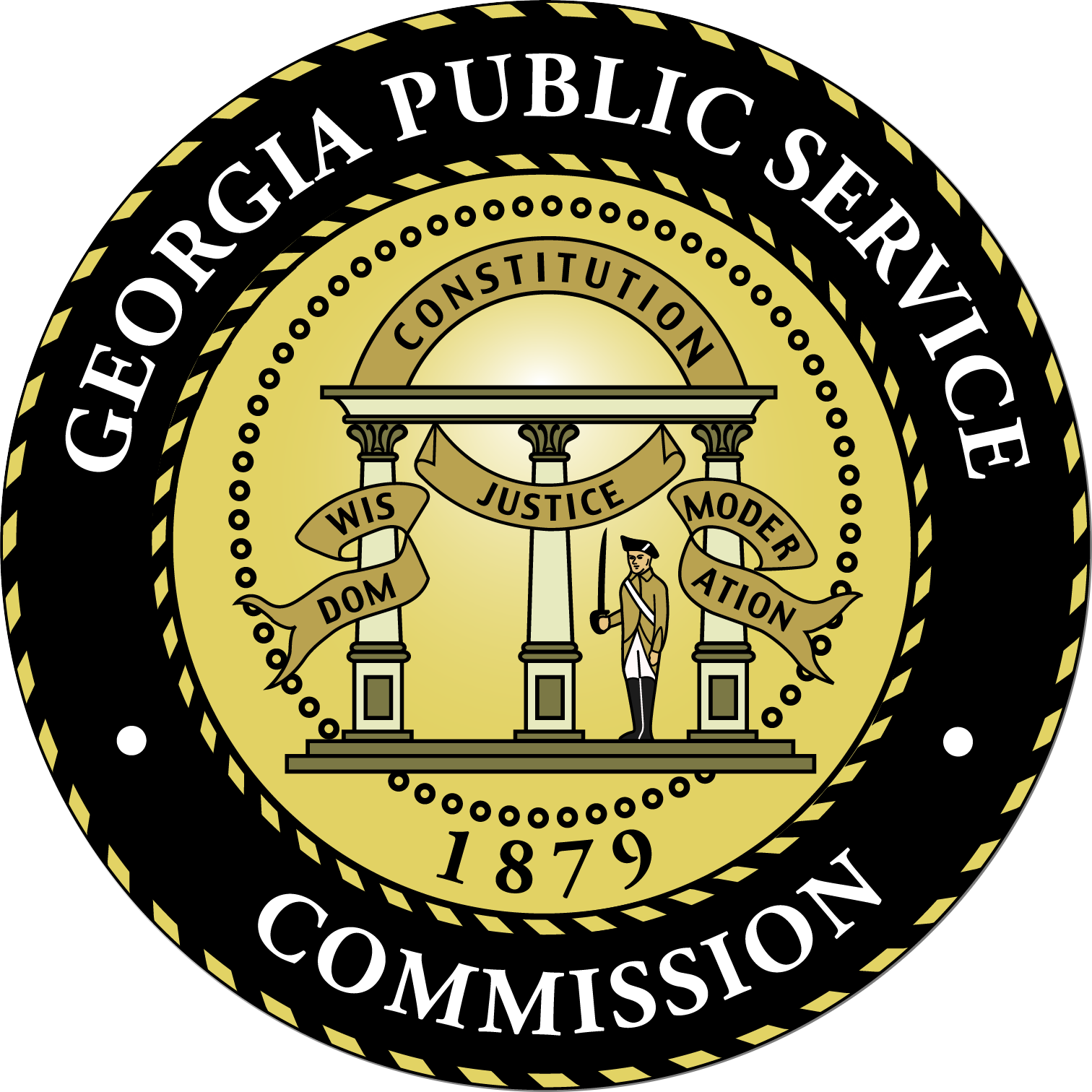

Commission overview
- Formed: 1879
- Type: Public utilities commission
- Jurisdiction: Government of Georgia
- Headquarters: Atlanta
- Commission executives: Jason Shaw (R), Chairman; Bubba McDonald (R), Vice-Chairman; Tricia Pridemore (R), Commissioner; Peter Hubbard (D), Commissioner; Alicia Johnson (D), Commissioner
- Website: psc.ga.gov

The Georgia Public Service Commission (PSC) is a statutory organ of the state government of Georgia; elected among five commission districts, the board consists of a Chairman, a Vice-chairman, and three Commissioners. PSC regulates telecommunications, transportation, electric and natural gas services in the U.S. state of Georgia. Commissioners are elected in partisan elections statewide, though they must reside in a district.

The PSC is charged with protecting the public interest and promoting a healthy business-investment economy. The PSC is responsible for varying degrees of regulation in State telecommunications, gas, and electric companies and for establishing and enforcing the standards for quality of service. Unlike counterparts in other states, the Georgia PSC does not regulate water/sewer or gas providers.

== History ==
The regulatory functions of the PSC have changed dramatically since its founding. On October 14, 1879, Georgia became one of the first states to establish a regulatory agency to oversee railroad expansion and competition. Known as the Railroad Commission of Georgia, the commission consisted of three members who were appointed by the governor and served staggered six-year terms. In 1891 telegraph and express companies came under the commission's jurisdiction. By 1907 the commission began to regulate docks and wharves, as well as telephone, gas, and electric-power companies, and in 1931 its jurisdiction expanded to cover the trucking industry. In 1922 the Georgia legislature changed the agency's name to the Georgia Public Service Commission to reflect its expanded regulatory role.

== PSC operations ==
In 1907 the number of commissioners elected statewide was increased from three to five. Today the five elected commissioners are supported by approximately ninety staff members, and, usually, every two years, the Chair is selected by the commission members. Beginning with the 2000 election year, each seat on the commission is assigned to one of five districts. Candidates for the commission must reside in the district with the available commission seat, although the entire state continues to vote for all five slots. Commissioners serve staggered six-year terms.

The commission depends primarily on appropriations from the Georgia General Assembly. In fiscal year 1999 the total budget of the PSC amounted to approximately $14 million, with approximately $9.5 million coming from the Georgia legislature and the remaining $4.4 million from the federal government and other funds. The fiscal year 2004 budget was $9.3 million. When regulated utility companies bring a rate request before the PSC, the request is first addressed by one of the commission's four standing committees: telecommunications, energy, transportation, or policy development and intergovernmental affairs. The commissioners are assisted by experts on utility and transportation operations, who may provide testimony and make recommendations regarding rates or arbitration. The PSC makes decisions by a majority vote of the commissioners. It is authorized only to issue administrative orders. Furthermore, its rulings must be consistent with current legal standards and are subject to judicial review by the courts.

== Regulatory functions of the PSC ==
Although the PSC over the years has regulated the rates and service of the telecommunications, gas, and electric industries, today it does not regulate all utility companies within these sectors. The commission regulates only the rates charged and the services provided by most intrastate, investor-owned telecommunications, gas, and electric utilities operating in Georgia. The commission does not set rates for municipally owned electric and gas utilities or electric membership corporations, although these utilities consult the commission on such matters as financing and the resolution of territorial disputes. The commission also ensures the safety of all natural-gas pipelines in the state. The commission plays a smaller role with regard to the transportation sector. Its authority over truck and express companies and private and for-hire motor carriers is restricted to requiring proof of insurance and safety inspections.

== Deregulation ==
The deregulation of the telecommunications and natural gas industries in the 1990s greatly altered the regulatory functions of the PSC. Instead of regulating the rates of telephone and gas services, the commission plays a strong role as a manager and facilitator of open-market competition.

=== Telecommunications ===
Georgia's Telecommunication and Competition Development Act of 1995 and the Federal Telecommunications Act of 1996 have greatly affected the telecommunications industry in Georgia. Both statutes sought to turn the traditional regulated monopoly service into a competitive market. Thus the commission no longer sets rates for telephone services but establishes and administers a universal access fund, which ensures reasonable access to services for customers; monitors rates and service quality; and mediates disputes between competitors. By the end of 2003 the number of certificated local competitive telephone exchange providers had grown to 221.

=== Natural gas ===
More than 1.8 million Georgia customers use natural gas. In early 1997 Georgia became the first state to adopt legislation to deregulate natural gas with the Natural Gas Competition and Deregulation Act. The commission's role under the Natural Gas Act is similar to the one it plays in the telecommunications market: to facilitate the transition from a regulated monopoly to a competitive marketplace. As part of the deregulation process, the Atlanta Gas Light Company, which had long held a monopoly in the market, withdrew from selling natural gas to become a distributor of natural gas in 1999. Unregulated marketing companies now sell natural gas at variable prices, much in the way that long-distance telephone companies operate.

By all accounts Georgia's transition from monopoly to market competition has been very contentious. Several problems have plagued the deregulation process from the beginning, and unusually high gas prices have recently exacerbated the situation. As facilitator of the deregulation process, the PSC has played a high-profile role in several disputes. First, early in the deregulation process, the PSC settled several "slamming" cases with marketers. Slamming occurs when companies switch customers without their authorization. Second, after several marketers persistently billed customers incorrectly, the PSC resolved the billing disputes. Third, in November 2000 several marketers threatened to shut off service for nonpayment of bills. The PSC voted unanimously to impose an immediate moratorium through April 1, 2001, on shutoffs of gas service for residential customers. In January 2001, in a three-to-two vote, the PSC overrode protests from natural-gas marketers and enacted emergency rules to allow consumers who owe money in back bills to switch to marketers with lower prices.

== Elections ==
Districts used from 2002 to 2012

Districts used from 2012 to 2022

From 1877 to 1906, the Railroad Commission was a three-member body appointed by the governor and confirmed by the state senate. In 1906, the Georgia State Constitution reformed the Railroad Commission into a five-member body elected at-large statewide. In 1998, the General Assembly passed HB95, requiring members of the PSC to live in residency districts while retaining the requirement for candidates to run statewide. In 1996, Republicans gained a majority on the PSC for the first time, and would win all seats by 2006.

The 1998 elections change was met since with criticism that the residency requirement diluted the voting power of Black residents in Georgia's racially-polarized voting environment. David Burgess, a Democrat who was appointed by Roy Barnes in 1998 to represent District 3, was the first African-American member of the PSC and won election to a full term in 2000, but was defeated for re-election in 2006 by Chuck Eaton. Since then, it took until the 2025 election of Alicia Johnson for another African American party nominee to be elected to a seat on the PSC. In addition, six runoff elections were held for seats on the PSC in 1992, 1998, 2006, 2008, 2018 and 2020, in which racial polarization resulted in candidates preferred most by African-American candidates being repeatedly defeated in runoff elections.

=== 2020-present ===
PSC districts since 2022

After the 2020 PSC election, in which African-American Democrat Daniel Blackman was defeated in a run-off by District 4 incumbent Lauren "Bubba" McDonald (who won the most total votes of all three Republican statewide candidates on the runoff ballot, while both David Perdue and Kelly Loeffler lost their runoffs for U.S. Senate on the same ballot), a lawsuit was filed against the PSC election method by Georgia Conservation Voters, alleging that the method violated the Voting Rights Act of 1965.

Other litigation occurred in 2022 regarding the residency requirement, with Gwinnett County resident Patty Durand having qualified for District 2 as a Democrat prior to the passage of legislation which redistricted Gwinnett County from District 2 to District 4. Following the passage of the legislation, Durand switched her residency into a county further into the newly-drawn District 2. Georgia Secretary of State Brad Raffensperger moved to remove Durand from the Democratic primary ballot for 2022 for residency, but was blocked by a state judge. Durand alleged that Gwinnett County was moved out of the district in order to deny a challenge to Republican incumbent Tim Echols. Other litigation was filed after the Democratic primary for District 3, in which Chandra Farley challenged Democratic nominee Shelia Edwards' residency in District 3.

On August 5, 2022, Judge Steven D. Grimberg ruled in Rose v. Raffensperger that the requirement that candidates live in a district but be elected at-large statewide diluted Black voters' voting power and ordered Raffensperger to cancel the 2022 election until either a new election method is devised by the General Assembly or, failing that, devised by the court. The state appealed the ruling to the Eleventh Circuit Court of Appeals, which stayed Grimberg's ruling and restored the election to the ballot. On August 19, 2022, the Supreme Court of the United States issued a preliminary ruling vacating the 11th Circuit's stay of the Grimberg ruling, delaying the 2022 elections for PSC and directing the 11th Circuit to review the ruling; the Georgia Secretary of State's office did not contest the ruling, delaying the elections to 2023. In November 2023, the 11th Circuit overturned the District court decision, allowing statewide elections to resume. The U.S. Supreme Court declined to consider an appeal in June 2024.

In March 2024, a new law was passed by the Georgia legislature extending the terms of current commissioners and establishing a new schedule of statewide elections. Under the plan commissioners from Districts 2 and 3 faced special elections in 2025, followed by regularly scheduled elections in 2030 and 2026 respectively. Commissioners from Districts 1, 4 and 5 will face elections in 2028, 2028, and 2026 respectively.

=== Current members ===
District	Name	Party	Start	Next Election
1	Jason Shaw, Chair	Republican	January 3, 2019	2028
2	Alicia Johnson	Democratic	January 11, 2026	2030
3	Peter Hubbard	Democratic	January 11, 2026	2026
4	Bubba McDonald, Vice Chair	Republican	January 1, 2009	2028
5	Stan Wise	Republican	September 4, 2026 (appointed)	2026 (retiring)

=== List of members ===
Member	District	Party	Term		Notes
James M. Smith		Democratic	1879	1885	appointed first chairman of the Railroad Commission after being defeated for re-election as governor.
Campbell Wallace		Democratic	1879	1890	
Samuel Barnett		Democratic	1879	1881	
Leander N. Trammell		Democratic	1881	1900	
Alexander S. Ervin		Democratic	1885	1891	
James W. Robertson		Democratic	1890	1891	
Virgil Powers		Democratic	1891	1894	
Allen Fort		Democratic	1891	1897	
G. Gunby Jordan		Democratic	1894	1895	
G. Gunby Jordan		Democratic	1901	1904	
Thomas C. Crenshaw, Jr.		Democratic	1895	1901	
Justice Spencer R. Atkinson		Democratic	1897	1903	
J. Pope Brown		Democratic	1900	1905	
Justice H. Warner Hill		Democratic	1903	1911	
Obadiah B. Stevens		Democratic	1905	1911	
Joseph M. Brown		Democratic	1904	1907	appointed by Governor Joseph M. Terrell. Appointment was rescinded in 1907 when the next Governor, Hoke Smith, removed Brown over disagreements about passenger fares. Later elected governor in 1908.
F. E. Callaway, Sr.		Democratic	1907	1909	
George Hillyer		Democratic	1907	1918	
S. G. McClendon		Democratic	1907	1909	
Charles Murphey Candler		Democratic	1909	1922	
Joseph F. Gray		Democratic	1909	1916	
Paul B. Trammell		Democratic	1911	1926	
James A. Perry		Democratic	1911	1933	
James A. Perry		Democratic	1936	1957	
John T. Boifeuillet		Democratic	1916	1926	
James D. Price		Democratic	1919	1925	
Walter R. McDonald		Democratic	1923	1933	
Walter R. McDonald		Democratic	1935	1971	
Calvin W. Parker		Democratic	1926	1931	
Oscar Roswell Bennett		Democratic	1925	1928	
Albert J. Woodruff		Democratic	1926	1933	
Perry T. Knight		Democratic	1928	1933	
Perry T. Knight		Democratic	1936	1953	
Jule W. Felton, Sr.		Democratic	1931	1933	Appointed by Richard Russell Jr. but lost his bid for a full term. Later elected a judge and later a justice on the Supreme Court of Georgia.
Jud P. Wilhoit		Democratic	1933	1941	
George L. Goode		Democratic	1933	1935	
Thomas King Davis		Democratic	1933	1936	
Ben T. Huiet		Democratic	1933	1936	
James B. Daniel		Democratic	1933	1935	
Julian J. E. Anderson		Democratic	1935	1936	
Matt L. McWhorter		Democratic	1937	1961	
Allen Chappell		Democratic	1941	1964	
Crawford L. Pilcher		Democratic	1953	1968	Swapped parties in 1968, following the 1968 Democratic National Convention in Chicago.
Crawford L. Pilcher		Republican	1968	1972	Swapped parties in 1968, following the 1968 Democratic National Convention in Chicago.
Ben T. Wiggins		Democratic	1957	1979	
William Henry Kimbrough		Democratic	1961	1979	
Alpha Alsbury Fowler, Jr.		Democratic	1964	1968	Swapped parties in 1968, following the 1968 Democratic National Convention in Chicago.
Alpha Alsbury Fowler, Jr.		Republican	1968	1971	Swapped parties in 1968, following the 1968 Democratic National Convention in Chicago.
Bobby Pafford		Democratic	1971	1993	
Ford Spinks		Democratic	1971	1988	
J. Mac Barber		Democratic	1973	1984	
J. Mac Barber		Democratic	1991	1998	
Billy Lovett, Jr.		Democratic	1979	1990	
Bob Durden		Democratic	1991	2002	
Jim Hammock		Democratic	1980	1987	appointed by George Busbee to succeed Kimbrough
Gary B. Andrews		Democratic	1985	1990	appointed by Joe Frank Harris
Cas M. Robinson		Democratic	1987	1992	appointed by Joe Frank Harris
Robby Rowan		Democratic	1989	1994	
Bobby Baker		Republican	1993	2010	First Republican commissioner, first Republican elected to statewide office since Reconstruction.
Dave Baker		Republican	1995	1998	
David Burgess	3	Democratic	1998	2007	appointed by Roy Barnes, first African-American member
Earleen Sizemore		Democratic	2002	2002	appointed by Roy Barnes, first woman to serve on commission
Angela E. Speir	4	Republican	2003	2008	first woman elected to the Public Service Commission, first woman to chair the commission, second Republican woman elected to a statewide office
Doug Everett	1	Republican	2003	2018	resigned
Chuck Eaton	3	Republican	2007	2021	PSC became all-Republican body. Resigned in August 2021.
Tim Echols	2	Republican	2011	2026	
Tricia Pridemore	5	Republican	2018	2026	appointed by Nathan Deal
Fitz Johnson	3	Republican	2021	2026	appointed by Brian Kemp, first African American Republican member (term began August 12, 2021)
Lauren "Bubba" McDonald	4	Democratic	1998	2003	Appointed by Zell Miller. Won re-election as a Democrat in 1998 special election, lost bid for a full term in 2002. Switched parties and won election in 2008.
Lauren "Bubba" McDonald	4	Republican	2009	present	Appointed by Zell Miller. Won re-election as a Democrat in 1998 special election, lost bid for a full term in 2002. Switched parties and won election in 2008.
Jason Shaw	1	Republican	2019	present	appointed by Nathan Deal (term began January 1, 2019)
Alicia Johnson	2	Democratic	2026	present	won in the 2025 special election. First African American woman member.
Peter Hubbard	3	Democratic	2026	present	won in the 2025 special election
Stan Wise	5	Republican	1995	2018	
Stan Wise	5	Republican	2026	present	appointed by Brian Kemp

== See also ==
- Public Utilities Commission
