= Arlington Group =

Christian coalition

- Formation: 2002 (24 years ago)
- Founder: Donald Ellis Wildmon; Paul Michael Weyrich
- Purpose: Public policy advocacy
- Location: Washington, DC, United States
- Chairman: James Dobson

The Arlington Group was a coalition uniting the leaders of prominent Christian conservative organizations in the United States. Founded in 2002 principally through the efforts of American Family Association President Donald Wildmon and Free Congress Foundation Chairman Paul Weyrich, the group sought to establish consensus goals and strategy among its members and translate its combined constituency into an overwhelming force within the Republican Party, particularly at its highest levels. Its membership and purpose overlapped to a high degree with the Council for National Policy; but the group is much more narrowly focused, choosing to emphasize such issues as same-sex marriage, abortion, and confirmation of like-minded federal judges.

The group had mixed success. While widely acknowledged to have the ear of President George W. Bush and his chief political advisor Karl Rove, and while generally successful in its efforts to coordinate the Christian Right, it also endured noteworthy embarrassments. In early 2005, it threatened to withhold support for the President's proposed Social Security reforms if Bush did not vigorously support a federal constitutional ban on same-sex marriage. This provoked a firestorm of unwelcome media attention, but failed to produce the group's desired result (despite the President's continuing support for both their specific and broader aims). And later, in October 2005, Arlington Group Chairman and Focus on the Family founder James Dobson became the center of a minor scandal after leaking assurances made by Rove to an Arlington Group conference call regarding the pro-life credentials of Supreme Court nominee and White House counsel Harriet Miers. Miers withdrew her nomination later that month, largely due to reservations among conservatives.

== Membership ==
The organization's deliberations were strictly off-the-record, and membership was previously held confidential, but the group launched a website in July 2006 which listed its member organizations. In March 2007, the home page was taken down; according to an article in The Boston Globe, it was "abruptly disabled earlier this month after the Globe began making inquiries".

Since each group's principal served as its Arlington Group "member", but some of the groups were headed by a single principal (e.g., Focus on the Family and Focus on the Family Action are both headed by James Dobson), the site's list was somewhat confusing; and members were not required to disclose their participation. However, the following organizations and individuals were identified as members as of 2006:

- Alliance Defense Fund - Alan Sears
- American Family Association - Donald Wildmon
- American Values - Gary Bauer
- Bott Radio Network - Richard Bott
- Center for Moral Clarity - Rod Parsley
- Citizens for Community Values - Phil Burress
- Coalition of African American Pastors - William Owens, Sr.
- ConservativeHQ.com - Richard Viguerie
- Coral Ridge Ministries and Center for Reclaiming America - D. James Kennedy
- Covenant Marriage Movement - Phil Waugh
- Exodus International - Alan Chambers
- Family Research Council and FRC Action - Tony Perkins
- Florida Family Policy Council - John Stemberger
- Fieldsted & Company - Howard Ahmanson, Jr.
- Focus on the Family and Focus on the Family Action - James Dobson
- Free Congress Foundation - Paul Weyrich
- High Impact Leadership Coalition - Bishop Harry Jackson
- Inspiration Television Network
- Judeo-Christian Council for Constitutional Restoration and Vision America - Rick Scarborough
- Liberty Counsel - Mathew Staver
- Liberty University - Jerry Falwell
- National Association of Evangelicals - Leith Anderson
- Ohio Restoration Project - Russell Johnson
- Salem Communications - Stuart Epperson
- Southern Baptist Convention - Richard Land
- Susan B. Anthony List - Marjorie Dannenfelser
- Teen Mania Ministries - Ron Luce
- TeenPact - Tim Echols
- TheVanguard.org - Rod D. Martin
- Tradition, Family, Property
- Traditional Values Coalition - Lou Sheldon
- Your Catholic Voice - Raymond Flynn

== See also ==
- Christian fundamentalism
- Christian right
- Far-right politics
- Radical right (United States)
- Council for National Policy, a related group
