= Keisha Waites =

American politician (born 1972)

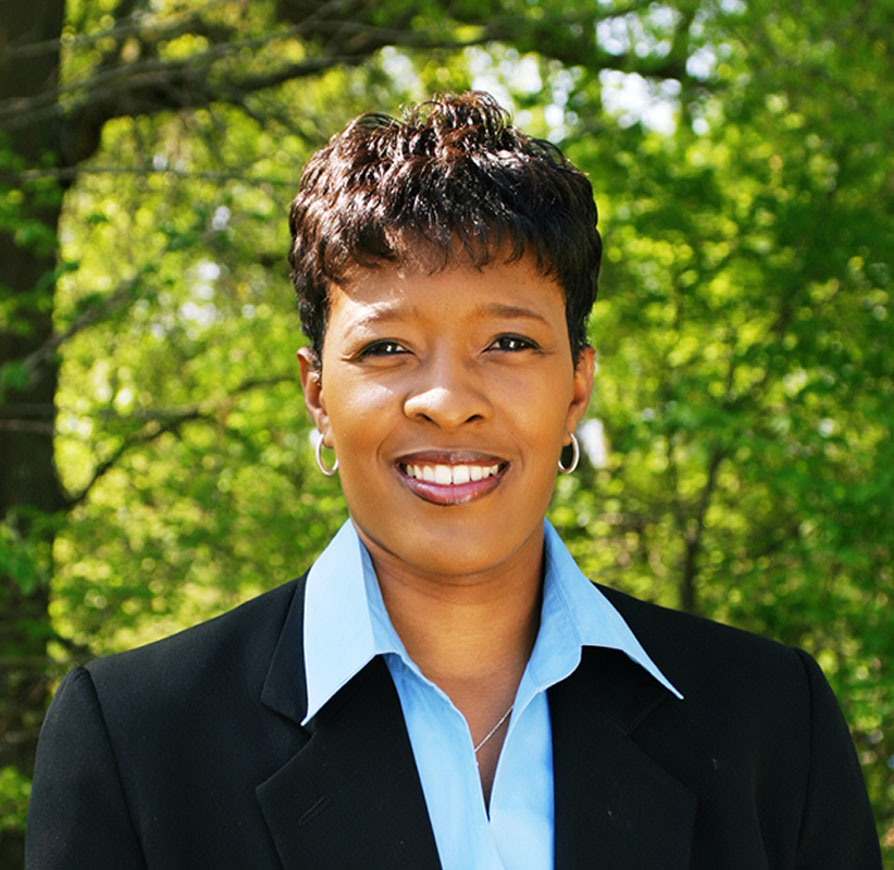

Insurance Commissioner-elect of Georgia
- Assuming office January 11, 2027
- Succeeding: John F. King

Member of the Atlanta City Council from the at-large district Post 3
- In office January 3, 2022 – March 8, 2024
- Preceded by: Andre Dickens
- Succeeded by: Eshé Collins

Member of the Georgia House of Representatives from the 60th district
- In office February 13, 2012 – September 18, 2017
- Preceded by: Gloria Bromell Tinubu
- Succeeded by: Kim Schofield

Personal details
- Born: Keisha Sean Waites; October 30, 1972 (age 54) Atlanta, Georgia, U.S.
- Party: Democratic
- Education: Atlanta Metropolitan State College (BA)
- Website: Campaign website

Keisha Sean Waites (October 30, 1972) is an American politician from the state of Georgia. A Democrat, she served in the Georgia House of Representatives from 2012 to 2017, representing southeast Atlanta, College Park, East Point, Hapeville, Forest Park, Hartsfield Jackson Airport, Porsche Headquarters and parts of Clayton and DeKalb counties. She also served as a member of Atlanta City Council for Post 3 At-Large from 2022 to 2024.

In 2026, Waites was elected Georgia Insurance Commissioner, defeating incumbent Republican John King.

== Early life and career ==
Waites was born at Grady Hospital in Atlanta. She attended Lakeside High School in Dekalb county and graduated in 1991. She then attended Georgia Southern and Atlanta Metropolitan College and graduated with a degree in political science. In 2014, Waites completed Harvard University's John F. Kennedy School of Government program for Senior Executives in State and Local Government as a David Bohnett LGBTQ Victory Institute Leadership Fellow.

In 2005, Waites was hired as a contract employee for FEMA's Long-Term Recovery Response and Operations for Hurricanes Katrina and Rita to help coordinate disaster assistance, and was selected by FEMA in 2010 to assist USAID’s External Affairs and Public Affairs Team following the earthquake in Haiti.

== Political career ==
Before winning election to the state legislature in 2012, Waites mounted seven unsuccessful campaigns for elected office:

1. 2001: Atlanta City Council, at-large post 1 (as Sean Waites)
2. 2002: State Senate, District 36: placed fourth in the Democratic primary
3. 2005: Atlanta City Council, District 12
4. 2006: Fulton County Commission
5. 2008: State House, District 61: lost primary runoff
6. 2009: Atlanta City Council, District 12
7. 2010: Fulton County Commission, District 6: lost primary runoff

In addition, Waites applied for an appointment to the Atlanta City Council in 2004, one of four candidates who put themselves forward to temporarily fill a vacant seat. The council did not select Waites for the vacancy, choosing Esther Stewart-Moseley instead.

Waites's qualified for the District 60 House seat on January 9, 2012. In the special election, she took 54.2 percent of the vote (321 votes) compared to 18.6 percent (110 votes) for Theresa Middlebrooks and 27.2 percent (161 votes) for Latrenka Riley, thus avoiding a runoff. In 2014, Waites ran unopposed for re-election for House District 60. She had a Republican opponent in 2016 for House District 60 but won a third term easily.

Waites resigned from her House seat on September 18, 2017, to run for the chairship of the Fulton County Commission. She finished in second place and advanced to a runoff election, which she lost to Robb Pitts by 10%. In a rematch during the regularly scheduled 2018 Democratic primary, Waites lost to Pitts by a narrower margin of 2%. She ran in the Democratic primary for Georgia's 13th congressional district against incumbent David Scott, coming in second place in a field of four candidates. She filed for the 5th congressional district special election to fill the remaining term of John Lewis.

In 2021, Waites filed to run for Atlanta City Council Post 3 At-Large to succeed incumbent Andre Dickens (who filed to run for Atlanta Mayor), her fourth bid for a council seat. After winning the largest share of votes in the first round among five candidates, Waites ran in a November 30 runoff with Jacki Labat, winning the runoff 52.4%-47.6%. Waites resigned in March 2024 to run for Fulton County Clerk of Superior and Magistrate Courts. She was defeated by appointed incumbent Ché Alexander in a four-way Democratic primary, who then won the general election unopposed.

Waites filed for the Georgia Public Service Commission special election for District 3 in March 2025. After leading the first round of the Democratic primary, she was defeated in the primary runoff by Peter Hubbard on July 16, 2025.

She filed for the 2026 Democratic primary for Georgia Insurance Commissioner. She led the first round for the May 16 primary, and defeated DeAndre Mathis in the June 16 primary runoff. She faced and defeated incumbent Insurance and Fire Commissioner John King in the general election on November 3, 2026.

== Personal life ==
Waites is lesbian.

== See also ==
- List of African-American statewide elected officials
- Timeline of African-American firsts
