= 2025 Georgia Public Service Commission special election =

- November 4, 2025

2 seats of the Georgia Public Service Commission
	First party	Second party
Party	Republican	Democratic
Seats before	5	0
Seats after	3	2
Seat change	▼2	▲2

The 2025 Georgia Public Service Commission special election was held in the U.S. state of Georgia on November 4, 2025, to elect two members to the Georgia Public Service Commission. Primary elections were held on June 17, 2025, and primary runoffs were held on July 15, 2025. The special election for District 2 was held for a term ending in 2030, while the special election for District 3 was held for a term ending in 2026. It is the first special election for a statewide office since the 2020–21 U.S. Senate special and runoff and for a statewide non-federal office since the PSC special election in 1998, as well as the first odd-year statewide non-federal election since the 1883 gubernatorial special election. It was held concurrently with multiple municipal elections across the state.

Democrats Alicia Johnson, who ran for District 2, and Peter Hubbard, who ran for District 3, flipped both seats, defeating Republican incumbents Tim Echols and Fitz Johnson in a landslide, respectively. It was the first time that Democrats won any seats on the PSC since the 2000 elections or any statewide non-federal offices since the 2006 elections. Johnson also became the first African American woman on the PSC, the first African American woman ever elected to statewide office in Georgia, and the second Democratic woman elected to statewide office after Cathy Cox.

== Background ==
Districts used for the 2025 elections

Two elections to the Public Service Commission were scheduled as part of the 2024 Georgia state elections, but they were postponed amidst an ongoing lawsuit by Fulton County residents. The election was scheduled following the dismissal of the lawsuit in early 2025, by District Court Judge William M. Ray II. A law passed by the General Assembly, HB 1312, scheduled the special elections for Districts 2 and 3 to return to the prior schedule of six-year terms, while scheduling elections for District 5 in 2026 and Districts 1 and 4 in 2028. Commissioners are elected statewide, but must live in the district they are running to represent.

The election was called by Georgia Secretary of State Brad Raffensperger on February 26, 2025.

== Campaign ==
The special elections for the Public Service Commission were the only statewide ballot items in 2025, leading both parties to anticipate very low voter turnout in the general election. Some saw the presence of municipal elections on the ballot in major cities as giving a potential advantage to Democrats, possibly leading to higher turnout in those areas relative to the rest of the state. Democrats had primarily campaigned on the cost of energy, which had been rising significantly in recent years, while Republicans had primarily campaigned on ensuring the reliability of the electric grid. Near election day, several prominent Republican officials such as governor Brian Kemp and Representative Marjorie Taylor Greene appeared at events to drive Republican turnout, with Democratic party operatives doing the same. YouTuber Hank Green additionally posted a video to boost the visibility of the race and encourage voting for the Democratic candidates.

== Results ==
Both Democrats won in landslide victories, securing nearly 63% of the vote in each of their respective races and flipping 22 counties across the state which had voted for Republican Donald Trump in the 2024 presidential election, sometimes by wide margins. Voter turnout was low relative to elections in even-numbered years, only about a third of the 2024 election, especially in strongly-Republican areas of the state. Stronger turnout in Atlanta due to the city's concurrent mayoral election, as well as a focus on the cost of electricity, are also attributed to the wide Democratic margins. Turnout was particularly high among African American voters, further contributing to these margins. Although Republicans maintained their majority on the Commission, observers still anticipated a shift in policy due to the nature of the issues the Commission tackles.

The elections were Democrats' first statewide victories in non-federal elections since 2006, and their first victories in a PSC election since 2000. Democrats view the elections as a positive bellwether for their potential performance during the 2026 midterms elections, especially in Georgia, where elections for governor and U.S. Senate will top the ticket. Hubbard will be up for re-election in 2026, as will incumbent Republican commissioner Tricia Pridemore.

== District 2 ==
2025 Georgia Public Service Commission District 2 special election
- November 4, 2025

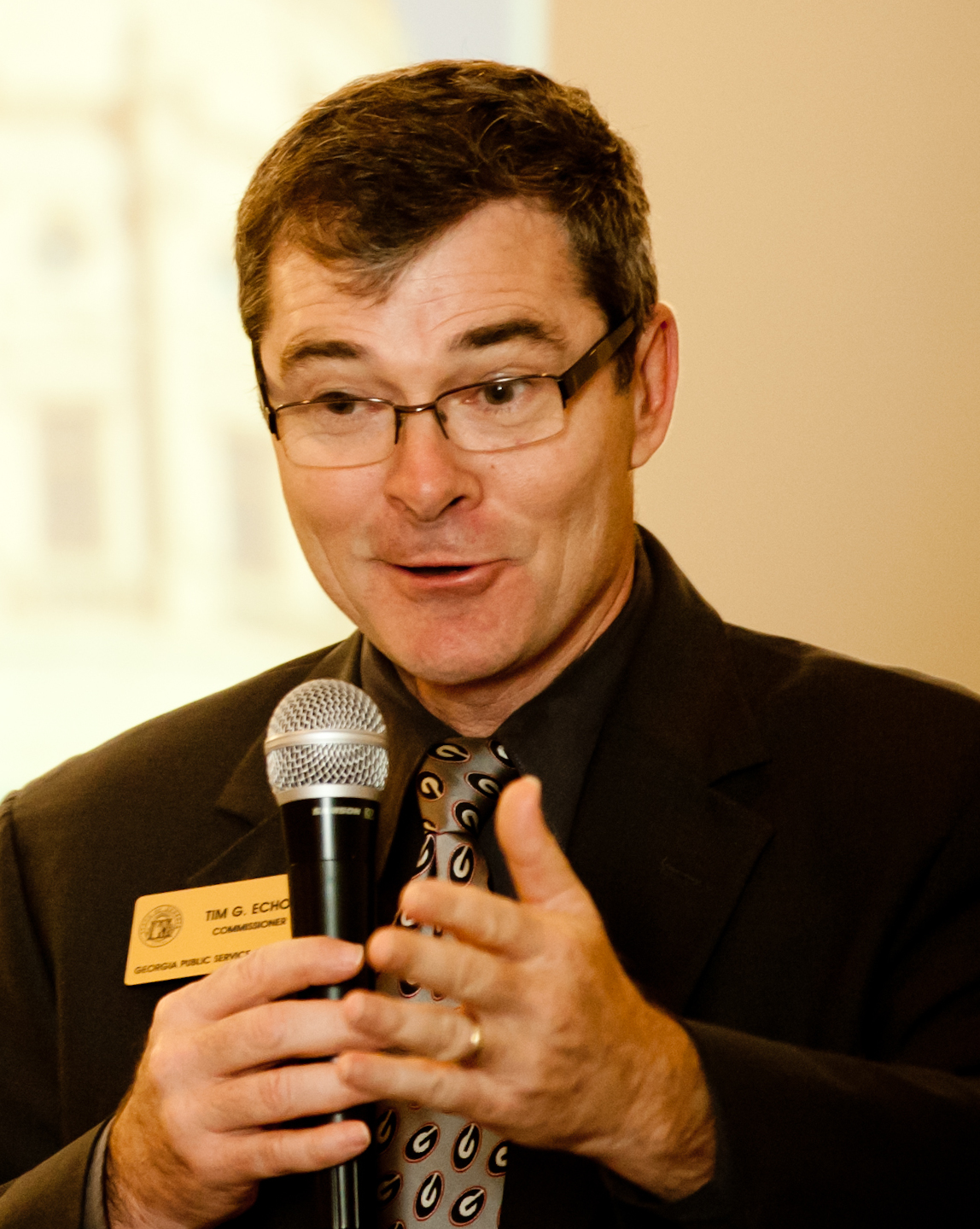
Candidate	Alicia Johnson	Tim Echols
Party	Democratic	Republican
Popular vote	980,471	582,402
Percentage	62.74%	37.26%
- Johnson: 50–60% 60–70% 70–80% 80–90% >90% Echols: 50–60% 60–70% 70–80% 80–90% >90%
Commissioner before election
Tim Echols
Republican
Elected Commissioner
Alicia Johnson
Democratic

=== Republican primary ===
==== Candidates ====
===== Nominee =====
- Tim Echols, incumbent commissioner

===== Eliminated in primary =====
- Lee Muns, former Columbia County school board member

==== Results ====
Republican primary
Party	Candidate	Votes	%
Republican	Tim Echols (incumbent)	47,986	75.76
Republican	Lee Muns	15,354	24.24
Total votes		63,340	100.00

=== Democratic primary ===
==== Candidates ====
===== Nominee =====
- Alicia Johnson, managing principal

==== Results ====
Democratic primary
Party	Candidate	Votes	%
Democratic	Alicia Johnson	125,727	100.00
Total votes		125,727	100.00

=== General election ===
==== Endorsements ====
Tim Echols (R)

Statewide officials

- Brian Kemp, Governor of Georgia (2019–present)

Labor unions

- AFL-CIO Georgia
- International Union of Painters and Allied Trades District Council 77
- International Brotherhood of Electrical Workers Locals 613, 470 and 84
- Augusta Building & Construction Trades Council
- Georgia Building Trades Council
- Southeastern Carpenters Regional Council
- International Union of Operating Engineers Local 926
- Ironworkers Local 387
- United Association Local 72
- Sheet Metal, Air, Rail and Transportation Workers Local 85

Organizations

- Georgia Chamber of Commerce
- Georgia Right to Life
Alicia Johnson (D)

Organizations

- Georgia Sierra Club
- Georgia Conservation Voters
- Southern Poverty Law Center Action Fund
- Jane Fonda Climate PAC

Political parties

- Georgia Working Families Party

==== Results ====
2025 Georgia Public Service Commission special election, district 2
Party	Candidate	Votes	%
Democratic	Alicia Johnson	980,471	62.74
Republican	Tim Echols (incumbent)	582,402	37.26
Total votes		1,562,873	100.00
Democratic gain from Republican			

==== By congressional district ====
Johnson won eight of 14 congressional districts, including three that Republicans held.

District	Echols	Johnson	Representative
1st	46.2%	53.8%	Buddy Carter
2nd	32.8%	67.2%	Sanford Bishop
3rd	54.9%	45.1%	Brian Jack
4th	13.3%	86.7%	Hank Johnson
5th	6.8%	93.2%	Nikema Williams
6th	15.9%	84.1%	Lucy McBath
7th	51.4%	48.6%	Rich McCormick
8th	51.2%	48.8%	Austin Scott
9th	56.6%	43.4%	Andrew Clyde
10th	45.9%	54.1%	Mike Collins
11th	50.7%	49.3%	Barry Loudermilk
12th	44.6%	55.4%	Rick Allen
13th	17.4%	82.6%	David Scott
14th	56.8%	43.2%	Marjorie Taylor Greene

== District 3 ==
2025 Georgia Public Service Commission District 3 special election
- November 4, 2025
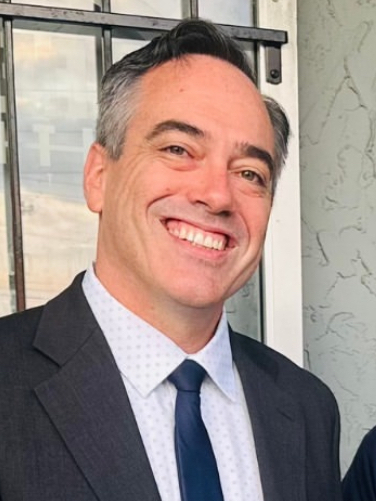

Candidate	Peter Hubbard	Fitz Johnson
Party	Democratic	Republican
Popular vote	982,157	578,476
Percentage	62.93%	37.07%
- Hubbard: 50–60% 60–70% 70–80% 80–90% >90% Johnson: 50–60% 60–70% 70–80% 80–90% >90%
Commissioner before election
Fitz Johnson
Republican
Elected Commissioner
Peter Hubbard
Democratic

=== Republican primary ===
==== Candidates ====
===== Nominee =====
- Fitz Johnson, incumbent commissioner

==== Results ====
Republican primary
Party	Candidate	Votes	%
Republican	Fitz Johnson (incumbent)	54,640	100.00
Total votes		54,640	100.00

=== Democratic primary ===
==== Candidates ====
===== Nominee =====
- Peter Hubbard, nonprofit founder

===== Eliminated in runoff =====
- Keisha Waites, former at-large Atlanta city councilor, former state representative, and perennial candidate (Note: Ran for Atlanta City Council in 2001, 2005, and 2009, candidate for Georgia Senate in 2002, candidate for Fulton County Commission in 2006, 2011, and 2017, candidate for Georgia House of Representatives in 2008, candidate for Georgia's 13th congressional district in 2020, candidate for Georgia's 6th congressional district in September 2020, and candidate for Fulton County Clerk of Courts in 2024)

===== Eliminated in primary =====
- Robert Jones, technology advisor

===== Disqualified =====
- Daniel Blackman, former regional administrator for the Environmental Protection Agency and nominee for Public Service Commission in 2014 and 2020

==== Endorsements ====
Peter Hubbard

State executive officials

- Roy Barnes, former Governor of Georgia (1999–2003)

State legislators

- Jasmine Clark, state representative from the 108th district
- Terry Cummings, state representative from the 39th district
- Saira Draper, state representative from the 90th district
- Nan Orrock, state senator from the 36th district
- Elena Parent, state senator from the 44th district

Organizations

- Georgia Sierra Club
- Georgia Conservation Voters
Keisha Waites

State legislators

- Gail Davenport, state senator from the 17th district
- Winfred Dukes, former state representative from the 154th district
- Craig Gordon, former state representative from the 163rd district
- Dexter Sharper, former state representative from the 177th district

==== Results ====
Primary results by county: Waites 80–90% 70–80% 60–70% 50–60% 40–50% 30–40% Hubbard 60–70% 50–60% 40–50% 30–40% Jones 90–100% 60–70% 50–60% 40–50% 30–40% Other Tie–40–50% Tie–30–40%

Democratic primary
Party	Candidate	Votes	%
Democratic	Keisha Waites	58,022	46.06
Democratic	Peter Hubbard	41,912	33.27
Democratic	Robert Jones	26,036	20.67
Total votes		125,970	100.00

==== Runoff results ====
Runoff results by county: Hubbard >90% 80–90% 70–80% 60–70% 50–60% Waites >90% 80–90% 70–80% 60–70% 50–60%

Democratic primary runoff
Party	Candidate	Votes	%
Democratic	Peter Hubbard	66,141	58.18
Democratic	Keisha Waites	47,551	41.82
Total votes		113,692	100.00

=== General election ===
==== Post-primary endorsements ====
Fitz Johnson (R)

Statewide officials

- Brian Kemp, Governor of Georgia (2019–present)

Organizations

- Georgia Chamber of Commerce
Peter Hubbard (D)

State legislators

- Keisha Waites, former at-large Atlanta city councilor and former state representative (eliminated in runoff)

Labor unions

- Georgia AFL-CIO

Organizations

- Southern Alliance for Clean Energy
- Southern Poverty Law Center Action Fund

==== Debates ====
2025 Georgia Public Service Commission District 3 debates
No.	Date	Host	Moderator	Link	Republican	Democratic
Key: P Participant A Absent N Not invited I Invited W Withdrawn						
Key: P Participant A Absent N Not invited I Invited W Withdrawn					Johnson	Hubbard
1	October 9, 2025	Atlanta Press Club	Donna Lowry	YouTube	A	P

==== Results ====
2025 Georgia Public Service Commission special election, district 3
Party	Candidate	Votes	%
Democratic	Peter Hubbard	982,157	62.93
Republican	Fitz Johnson (incumbent)	578,476	37.07
Total votes		1,560,633	100.00
Democratic gain from Republican			

==== By congressional district ====
Hubbard won eight of 14 congressional districts, including three that Republicans held.

District	Johnson	Hubbard	Representative
1st	46.0%	54.0%	Buddy Carter
2nd	33.0%	67.0%	Sanford Bishop
3rd	54.6%	45.4%	Brian Jack
4th	13.0%	87.0%	Hank Johnson
5th	6.5%	93.5%	Nikema Williams
6th	15.7%	84.3%	Lucy McBath
7th	50.7%	49.3%	Rich McCormick
8th	51.4%	48.6%	Austin Scott
9th	56.1%	43.9%	Andrew Clyde
10th	45.6%	54.4%	Mike Collins
11th	50.2%	49.8%	Barry Loudermilk
12th	45.2%	54.8%	Rick Allen
13th	17.4%	82.6%	David Scott
14th	56.6%	43.4%	Marjorie Taylor Greene
