= 2026 Georgia Insurance Commissioner election =

- November 3, 2026

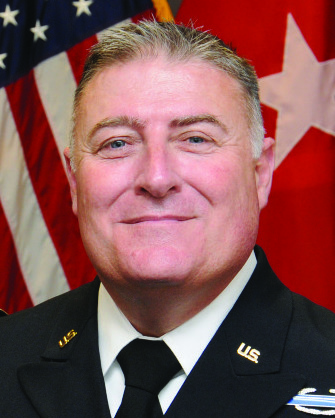
| Candidate | Keisha Sean Waites | John King |
| Party | Democratic | Republican |
| Popular vote | 2,172,258 | 1,834,274 |
| Percentage | 54.22% | 45.78% |
- Waites: 50–60% 60–70% 70–80% 80–90% >90% King: 50–60% 60–70% 70–80% 80–90% >90%
Insurance Commissioner before election
John King
Republican
Elected Insurance Commissioner
Keisha Sean Waites
Democratic

The 2026 Georgia Insurance Commissioner election was held on November 3, 2026, to elect the Georgia Insurance Commissioner. Primary elections were held on May 19, and a primary runoff election was held on June 16. Incumbent commissioner John King ran for re-election to a second consecutive four-year term, but lost the general election to Democratic challenger Keisha Sean Waites.

== Republican primary ==
King originally announced his intent to run for U.S. Senate in May 2025. He dropped out of the election and announced his intent to run for re-election as insurance commissioner in July.

=== Candidates ===
==== Nominee ====
- John King, incumbent commissioner

=== Results ===
Republican primary
| Party | Candidate | Votes | % |
|---|---|---|---|
| Republican | John King (incumbent) | 797,627 | 100.0 |
| Total votes | | 797,627 | 100.0 |

== Democratic primary ==
=== Candidates ===
==== Nominee ====
- Keisha Sean Waites, former at-large Atlanta city councilor (2022–2024), former state representative from the 60th district (2012–2017), and perennial candidate (Note: Ran for Atlanta City Council in 2001, 2005, and 2009, candidate for Georgia Senate in 2002, candidate for Fulton County Commission in 2006, 2011, and 2017, candidate for Georgia House of Representatives in 2008, candidate for Georgia's 13th congressional district in 2020, candidate for Georgia's 6th congressional district in September 2020, candidate for Fulton County Clerk of Courts in 2024, and candidate for Georgia Public Service Commission in 2025)

==== Eliminated in runoff ====
- DeAndre Mathis, insurance agent

==== Eliminated in primary ====
- Clarence Blalock, political consultant and GIS analyst and candidate for Georgia's 14th congressional district in 2024 (previously ran for labor commissioner)
- Thomas Gabriel Dean
- Ambuj Jain, entrepreneur

==== Withdrawn ====
- Nabilah Parkes, state senator from the 7th district (2023–present) (running for lieutenant governor)

==== Endorsements ====
DeAndre Mathis

Organizations

- Fair Fight Action (endorsed in runoff)

=== Results ===
Primary results by county: Waites: 20–30%; 30–40%; 40–50%; 50–60%; 60–70%; Mathis: 30–40%; Blalock: 30–40%

Democratic primary
| Party | Candidate | Votes | % |
|---|---|---|---|
| Democratic | Keisha Sean Waites | 428,308 | 42.0 |
| Democratic | DeAndre Mathis | 201,895 | 19.8 |
| Democratic | Clarence Blalock | 181,347 | 17.8 |
| Democratic | Ambuj Jain | 122,468 | 12.0 |
| Democratic | Thomas Gabriel Dean | 85,039 | 8.3 |
| Total votes | | 1,019,057 | 100.0 |

=== Runoff ===
==== Results ====
Runoff results by county: Waites: 50–60%; 60–70%; 70–80%; 80–90%; Mathis: 50–60%; 60–70%; Tie: 50–60%

Democratic primary runoff
| Party | Candidate | Votes | % |
|---|---|---|---|
| Democratic | Keisha Sean Waites | 224,125 | 58.7 |
| Democratic | DeAndre Mathis | 157,666 | 41.3 |
| Total votes | | 381,791 | 100.0 |

== General election ==
=== Results ===
2026 Georgia Insurance Commissioner election
| Party | Candidate | Votes | % | ±% |
|---|---|---|---|---|
| Republican | John King (incumbent) | | | |
| Democratic | Keisha Sean Waites | | | |
| Total votes | | | 100.0 | |
