= 2024 Georgia election =

2024 Georgia election may refer to:

- 2024 Georgia state elections in the state of Georgia in the United States
- 2024 Georgian parliamentary election in the Eastern European country of Georgia
