= Faith and Freedom Conference =

Two conferences go by the name Faith and Freedom Conference:

- A yearly conference held by the Faith and Freedom Coalition
- A yearly conference held by the Knights of the Ku Klux Klan
