= Georgia Insurance Commissioner =

Constitutional officer in the State of Georgia

The Georgia Commissioner of Insurance, Safety Fire Commissioner and Industrial Loan Commissioner, better known as the Georgia Insurance Commissioner, is a constitutional officer in the state of Georgia. Originally known as the Georgia Auditor upon its creation in 1782, the title was renamed as the Georgia Comptroller General in 1798. The enactment of the 1861 constitution established the office as a constitutional office. The office was initially elected by the General Assembly, and became directly elected after 1877. The title was renamed as the Georgia Comptroller General and ex-officio Commissioner of Insurance in 1912. In 2012, SB 343 was signed into law, removing the title of Comptroller General from the office and investing comptroller duties into the appointed State Accounting Office.

== List of commissioners ==
=== Auditors ===
| # | Image | Name | Term of service | Political party |
|---|---|---|---|---|
| | | John Gibbons | 1782 | |
| | | John Wereat | 1782–1792 | |
| | | Abraham Jones | 1793–1798 | |

=== Appointed comptrollers general ===
| # | Image | Name | Term of service | Political party |
|---|---|---|---|---|
| | | James Meriwether | 1799–1804 | |
| | | Eleazer Early | 1805–1808 | |
| | | James Bozeman | 1809–1824 | |
| | | William Triplett | 1825–1828 | |
| | | Thacker B. Howard | 1829–1833 | |
| | | William W. Carnes | 1834–1835 | |
| | | John G. Park | 1836–1842 | |
| | | David E. Bothwell | 1843–1848 | |
| | | Ezekiel S. Candler | 1849–1854 | |
| | | Peterson Thweatt | 1855–1864 | |
| | | John T. Burns | 1865–1867 | |
| | | Madison Bell | 1868–1872 | |
| | | W. L. Goldsmith | 1872–1879 | Democratic |

=== Elected comptrollers general and ex-officio insurance commissioners ===
| # | Image | Name | Term of service | Political party |
|---|---|---|---|---|
| | | W. L. Goldsmith | 1872–1879 | Democratic |
| | | William Ambrose Wright | 1879–1929 | Democratic |
| | | William B. Harrison | 1929–1936 | Democratic |
| | | Glenn B. Carreker | 1936 | Democratic |
| | | Homer C. Parker | 1936–1937 | Democratic |
| | | William B. Harrison | 1937–1940 | Democratic |
| | | Downing Musgrove | 1940–1941 | Democratic |
| | | Homer C. Parker | 1941–1946 | Democratic |
| | | William R. Mitchell | 1946–1947 | Democratic |
| | | Zack D. Cravey | 1947–1963 | Democratic |
| | | James L. Bentley | 1963–1971 | Democratic (until 1968) |
| | | James L. Bentley | 1963–1971 | Republican (1968–1971) |
| | | Johnnie L. Caldwell | 1971–1985 | Democratic |
| | | Warren D. Evans | 1985–1991 | Democratic |
| | | Tim Ryles | 1991–1995 | Democratic |
| | | John Oxendine | 1995–2011 | Republican |

=== Elected insurance commissioners ===
| # | Image | Name | Term of service | Political party |
|---|---|---|---|---|
| | | Ralph Hudgens | 2011–2019 | Republican |
| | | Jim Beck | 2019–2021 | Republican |
| 55 | | John F. King | 2021–present | Republican |
