= Ralph Reed =

American political pundit (born 1961)

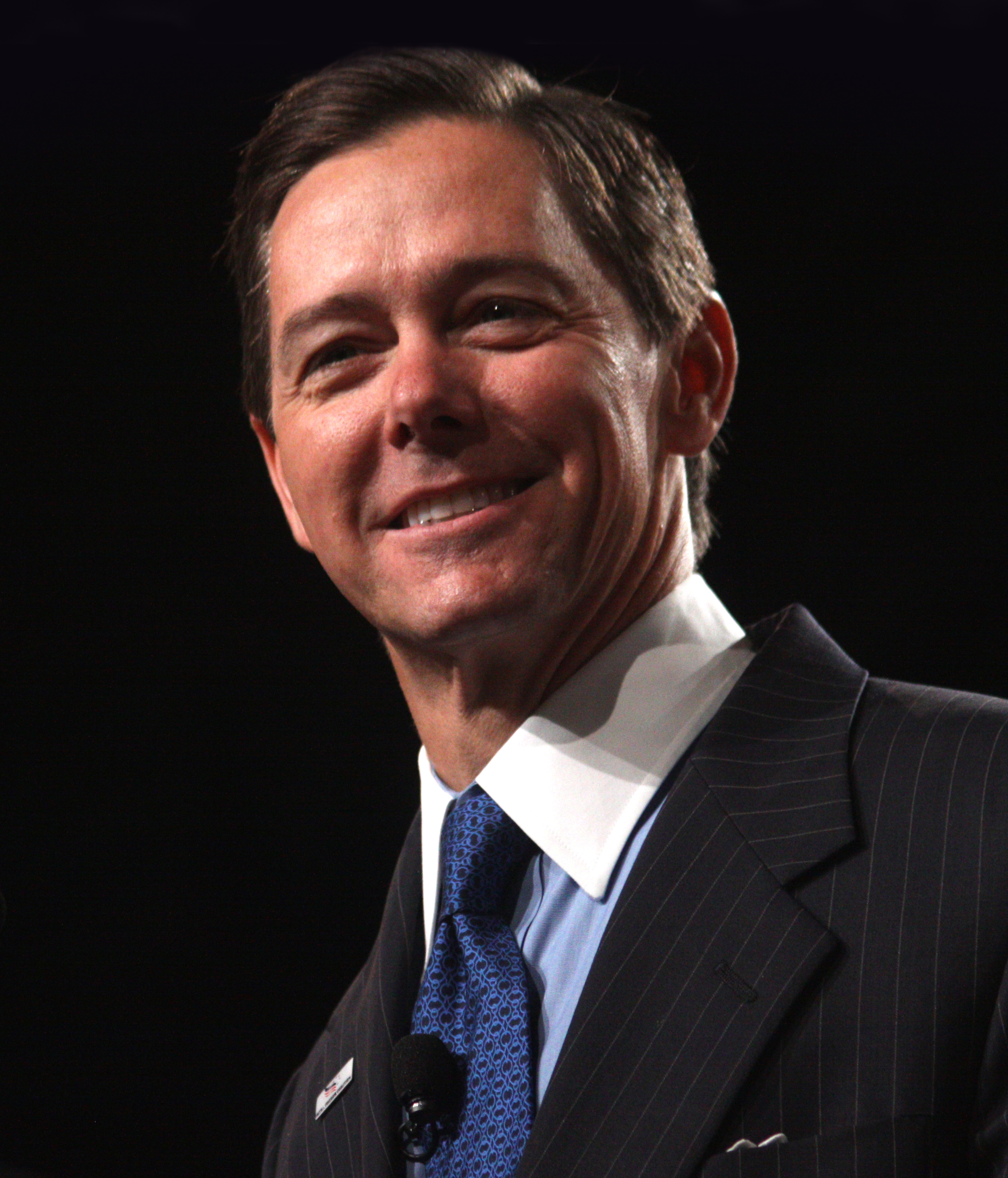
- Reed in February 2011

Chair of the Georgia Republican Party
- In office May 6, 2001 – February 21, 2003
- Preceded by: Chuck Clay
- Succeeded by: Alec Poitevint

Personal details
- Born: Ralph Eugene Reed Jr. June 24, 1961 (age 65) Portsmouth, Virginia, U.S.
- Party: Republican
- Spouse: JoAnne Young (m. 1987)
- Children: 4
- Education: University of Georgia (AB); Emory University (MA, PhD)

Ralph Eugene Reed Jr. (born June 24, 1961) is an American political consultant and lobbyist, best known as the first executive director of the Christian Coalition during the early 1990s. He sought the Republican nomination for Lieutenant Governor of Georgia but lost the primary election on July 18, 2006, to State Senator Casey Cagle. Reed started the Faith and Freedom Coalition in June 2009. He is a member of the Council for National Policy.

== Early life and education ==
Born in Portsmouth, Virginia, to Navy ophthalmologist Ralph Reed and mother Marcy Reed, Ralph Jr. moved often as a child, but spent most of his childhood in Miami, Florida. He moved with his family to Toccoa, Georgia, in 1976, earning Eagle Scout at BSA Troop 77 and graduating from Stephens County High School in 1979. He graduated from the University of Georgia with a BA in history in 1985. Reed served as a columnist and editor of the college newspaper, The Red & Black. In 1983, Reed, then a senior at the University of Georgia, wrote a column for The Red & Black with the headline "Gandhi: Ninny of the Twentieth Century." Shortly after the article ran, another student wrote that "every assertion, every quote, and several seemingly original Reed phrases may be found directly or in slightly modified form" in a commentary article by Richard Grenier. Reed was then discharged from his role on the college newspaper for plagiarism. He was a member of the Demosthenian Literary Society, the Jasper Dorsey Intercollegiate Debate Society, and College Republicans. He is also an alumnus of the Leadership Institute in Arlington, Virginia, an organization that teaches conservative Americans to influence public policy through activism and leadership. Reed obtained his PhD in American history from Emory University in 1991.

== Career ==
Reed spent much of his college career as a political activist, taking six years to earn his undergraduate degree. He started with the University of Georgia College Republicans, steadily rising to state and then national leadership. He was later profiled in Gang of Five by Nina Easton, along with Grover Norquist and other young activists who got their start in the 1980s.

=== The triumvirate ===
In 1981, Reed moved to Washington, D.C., to intern at the College Republican National Committee (CRNC). At the CRNC, Jack Abramoff, Norquist, and Reed formed what was known as the "Abramoff-Norquist-Reed triumvirate." Abramoff promoted Reed in 1983, appointing him to succeed Norquist as executive director of the CRNC. Norquist later served as president of Americans for Tax Reform, in Washington, D.C.

=== Religious experience ===
Reed has said that, in September 1983, he had a religious experience while at Bullfeathers, an upscale pub in Capitol Hill popular with staffers (and, to a lesser extent, members) of the House of Representatives. Of the experience, Reed said, "the Holy Spirit simply demanded me to come to Jesus". He walked outside the pub to a phone booth, thumbed through the yellow pages under "Churches," and found the Evangelical Assembly of God Church in Camp Springs, Maryland. He visited the next morning and became a born-again Christian.

=== Students for America ===
After receiving his AB he moved to Raleigh, North Carolina to help start and lead Students for America (SFA), a conservative activist group supported by U.S. Senator Jesse Helms. SFA became largely dominated by members of Maranatha Campus Ministries, and this brought Reed into contact with Ed Buckham and Jim Backlin, the current Legislative Director of the Christian Coalition. Reed's links to Tom DeLay were forged through his association with Buckham and Backlin.

SFA established chapters on college campuses up and down the East Coast and held conferences. Among other issues, SFA supported Helms' bid for re-election and organized abortion clinic protests. Reed was temporarily arrested during an abortion protest at the Fleming Center Abortion Clinic in Raleigh but was not charged with any crime. After Reed left SFA for a bigger job at the Christian Coalition, SFA faded out of existence by the early 1990s.

=== Role in the Christian Coalition ===
Reed was hired by religious broadcaster and Presidential candidate Pat Robertson as executive director of the Christian Coalition in Virginia Beach, Virginia. Robertson, his son, Gordon P. Robertson, Dick Weinold, a Robertson activist from Texas, and Billy McCormack, a pastor from Shreveport, Louisiana, were the original four directors of the organization. McCormack also held the title of "vice president" and had been his state director of "Americans for Robertson" in 1988.

Reed led the organization from 1989 to 1997. After Republicans lost in the 1996 elections many thought Reed would not be long for the Coalition, and would soon depart seeking new challenges. Some alleged that another factor in Reed's decision was an investigation by federal prosecutors due to charges made by the Christian Coalition's former chief financial officer, Judy Liebert. Reed resigned from his post, and moved to Georgia. The Coalition's finances were collapsing, and the Internal Revenue Service and Federal Election Commission were investigating.

The Coalition organized former Robertson supporters and other religious conservatives to oppose political liberalism. Eschewing confrontational tactics of street protest learned in college, Reed attempted to project a "softer" public face for Christian conservatism, self-described as "guerrilla", putting "enemies" in "body bags" before they even realized he had struck.

In the 1990s, Reed and the coalition protested the Clinton administration's policies. They were credited with mobilizing Christian conservatives in support of Republican candidates in the 1994 Congressional elections. Reed appeared on the cover of Time on May 15, 1995, under the title "The Right Hand of God: Ralph Reed of the Christian Coalition."

In 1996, the Federal Election Commission (FEC) brought an enforcement action in United States District Court, alleging Reed and the coalition "violated federal campaign finance laws during congressional elections in 1990, 1992 and 1994, and the presidential election in 1992." After a three-year investigation and lawsuit, a federal court ordered the Coalition to pay a small fine for two minor infractions, significantly less than the FEC had called for.

On resigning as executive director of the Christian Coalition, Reed moved to the Atlanta suburb of Duluth to begin a career as a political consultant and lobbyist.

=== 1998 Georgia lieutenant gubernatorial election ===
In late 1997, Reed joined the campaign of Fulton County Commission Chairman Mitch Skandalakis for lieutenant governor of Georgia, becoming its general consultant. In addition to planning campaign strategy, Reed appeared in advertisements, identifying himself as the former head of the Christian Coalition and vouching for Skandalakis's conservative credentials and personal integrity.

In the primary, Skandalakis placed first among the five Republican candidates, but did not receive a majority of the vote and was forced into a run-off with second-place finisher State Senator Clint Day. Reed planned a series of advertisements that included charges that Day had "desecrated Indian graves" on a plot of land owned by a Day family foundation. The Skandalakis campaign held a conference at which tribal leaders, wearing headdress and other ceremonial clothing, attacked Day as a "vandal" and "grave robber."

Reed's strategy initially met with success, as Skandalakis narrowly defeated Day in the Republican primary run-off. But Skandalakis lost the general election.

=== Century Strategies ===
While running the Skandalakis campaign in 1997, Reed co-founded Century Strategies with political strategist Tim Phillips. Century Strategies describes itself as "one of the nation's leading public affairs and public relations firms." While initially engaged primarily in campaign consulting for Republican candidates its mission evolved into advocacy and lobbying.

Reed helped Alabama Governor Fob James win renomination in a bitterly contested Republican primary, only to become the first Republican in over a decade to lose the Alabama governor's election. Immediately after the 1998 election, Reed shifted gears to corporate work. In 1999, Abramoff helped Reed get hired as a consultant subcontractor for Preston Gates & Ellis.

Reed is credited with attacks on Senator John McCain in the 2000 South Carolina Republican presidential primary, together with Roberta Combs, then head of the South Carolina Christian Coalition, who later took over the national Christian Coalition. Bush's defeat of McCain in that primary came at a key moment and ended McCain's early momentum from an upset victory in the New Hampshire primary.

Reed's $20,000 per month contract with Microsoft proved a minor embarrassment to the Bush campaign in the summer of 2000 when it was revealed that the software giant, which was being prosecuted for antitrust violations, had hired a number of Bush aides as consultants and lobbyists. Reed apologized for the "appearance of conflict" but continued to accept the money until 2005, when Microsoft terminated Reed amid the Indian gaming scandal.

Some conservatives have criticized Reed's choice of clients and suggested that he has inappropriately profited from his credentials as a conservative Christian leader. The conservative Alabama group Obligation, Inc. is a fierce critic of Reed's client Channel One News, arguing that the company pumps classrooms full of "commercials for junk food and sleazy movies."

In 1999, Reed's firm sent out a mailer to Alabama conservative Christians asking them to call then-Representative Bob Riley and tell him to vote against legislation that would have made the Northern Mariana Islands subject to federal wage and worker safety laws. Abramoff represented the commonwealth as a partner of Greenberg Traurig and received $4.04 million from 1998 to 2002. Greenberg Traurig, in turn, hired Reed's firm to print the mailing.

=== Georgia Republican Party chairman ===
In 2001, Reed mounted a campaign for State Chairman of the Georgia Republican Party, a volunteer job. His candidacy attracted national media attention, and challenges from three opponents.

Reed's principal opponent was David Shafer, a former executive director of the Georgia Republican Party recruited to the race by Congressman John Linder. Shafer campaigned on Republican gains made when he served as state executive director in the early 1990s, but was hampered by his subsequent association with the failed campaigns of Mack Mattingly, Guy Millner and Clint Day in the later half of the decade.

The state convention, held at the Cobb Galleria in May 2001, was the most heavily attended and longest running in the history of the party. Reed won on the first ballot, capturing almost 60% of the delegate vote to Shafer's 40%. Lobbyist Maria Rose Strollo won 1%.

Reed was endorsed by the "Confederate Republican Caucus," a block of almost 500 "heritage" activists who had participated in the state convention as a protest against the removal of the Confederate battle emblem from the State Flag. The organization later claimed it had been "double-crossed" by Reed.

Documents released by federal investigators in 2005 show that Reed's 2001 campaign for State Chairman was partially financed with contributions from the Choctaws, an Indian gaming tribe represented by Abramoff.

The party experienced success in the 2002 elections under Reed's leadership. Saxby Chambliss was elected U.S. senator and Sonny Perdue was elected governor. Reed, however, was asked to relinquish his job as State Chairman by Perdue, whose long-shot candidacy was largely ignored by Reed in favor of Chambliss.

Reed supported the candidacy of Congressman Bob Barr, who had moved into the neighboring district of Congressman John Linder and challenged his renomination. Linder decisively defeated Barr.

=== 2006 Georgia lieutenant gubernatorial election ===
Speculation about a Reed candidacy for Lieutenant Governor began building shortly after the 2004 general election. Republican party leaders were unenthusiastic about the candidacy of Insurance Commissioner John Oxendine, who had been "exploring" a race for Lieutenant Governor for over a year. Aides to Governor Sonny Perdue tried to recruit House Republican Leader Jerry Keen as a candidate for Lieutenant Governor, while State Senators Casey Cagle and Bill Stephens jockeyed for support among Senate Republicans.

Reed claimed support of the White House, access to the Bush fundraising apparatus and command of a large grass roots organization. His official declaration of candidacy on February 17, 2005, largely cleared the field of opposition; Keen, Stephens and Oxendine all left the race. Keen, a former state chairman of the Christian Coalition, was the first to drop, followed quickly by Stephens. Although insisting at the time of Reed's entry into the race that he would "never" withdraw, Oxendine ended his candidacy two weeks later. Only Cagle, a relatively unknown lawmaker, remained in the race to challenge Reed.

A poll conducted for Oxendine was the first indication of trouble for Reed. Released shortly before Oxendine's exit from the race, the poll showed Oxendine defeating Reed among likely Republican voters by a large margin. It also showed Reed losing the general election to the only announced Democratic candidate for Lieutenant Governor, former State Senator Greg Hecht. Little attention was paid to the poll because Oxendine folded his own candidacy shortly after it was released. Reed himself dismissed the poll as a face-saving gesture by an embarrassed Oxendine.

Reed's campaign experienced a loss of momentum with revelations about his role in the Jack Abramoff Indian lobbying scandal. Email documents released in the investigation revealed details about Reed's financial relationships with Abramoff.

Reed's early lead in fund-raising evaporated by December 31, 2005, when disclosure reports showed Cagle raising almost twice as much money as Reed in the last six months of the year.

Bob Irvin, a former U.S. House of Representatives Republican leader, was the first prominent Republican to publicly call on Reed to withdraw from the race. 21 state senators signed a letter in February 2006 calling on Reed to withdraw from the race, "declaring that his ties to Washington lobbyist Jack Abramoff could jeopardize the re-election of Gov. Sonny Perdue and the rest of the GOP ticket.” Reed rejected the petition as a useless stunt, and expressed confidence that his record and ideas would prevail.

Aides to Speaker of the House Glenn Richardson, ostensibly neutral in the race, released a poll that showed Reed's mounting negatives could hurt Perdue and the Republican ticket. On March 21, 2006, political consultant Matt Towery of Insider Advantage released a poll showing Reed represented an eight-point drag on the Perdue ticket.

Insurance Commissioner John Oxendine, whose ambitions had been upended by Reed's candidacy, endorsed Cagle in June 2006, saying that Reed's nomination threatened the success of the Republican ticket.

Two dozen members of the Reed steering committee, including a Reed State co-chairman, resigned from the Reed campaign and endorsed Cagle, but Reed continued his pursuit of the nomination.

New York Mayor Rudy Giuliani traveled to Georgia to campaign for Reed. A Democrat, conservative former United States Senator Zell Miller, also endorsed Reed.

On July 18, 2006, Reed lost the Republican primary to Cagle with 44% of the vote to Cagle's 56%. According to Politics1.com, Reed indicated he would not likely seek elective office ever again.

=== Indian gambling scandals ===
Reed was named, but never charged with any wrongdoing, in the scandal arising from lobbying work Jack Abramoff performed on behalf of Indian gambling tribes. Emails released by federal investigators in 2005 revealed that Reed secretly accepted payments from Abramoff to lobby against Indian casino gambling and oppose an Alabama education lottery and that Reed also worked for another Abramoff client seeking to block a congressional ban on Internet gambling. These cases are being investigated by multiple federal and state grand juries and by the U.S. Senate Committee on Indian Affairs. Abramoff pleaded guilty to three felony counts in federal court, raising the prospects of Abramoff testifying against others.

Those emails and other evidence revealed the participation of the Christian Coalition in the alleged fraud, particularly its Alabama chapter, which received large amounts of donations from the casino money. It is alleged that Abramoff engaged Reed to set up an anti-gambling campaign to include the U.S. Family Network, the Christian Coalition, and Focus on the Family in order to frighten the tribes into spending as much as $82 million for Abramoff to lobby on their behalf. To represent him in connection with the scandal, Reed retained defense attorney W. Neil Eggleston, then of Debevoise & Plimpton LLP. Eggleston served as White House associate counsel during the administration of President Bill Clinton.

In 2004, Reed confirmed that he had been paid more than $1 million in fees by lobbyists working on behalf of American Indian casinos.

In December 2005, three Texas public interest groups filed a complaint with Travis County Attorney David Escamilla on December 1, 2005, alleging that Reed failed to register as a lobbyist in 2001 or 2002 when he was working for Abramoff. Escamilla said on March 27, 2006, "his office had concluded its investigation—but that a two-year statute of limitations on misdemeanors from 2001 and 2002 had expired."

On June 22, 2006, the U.S. Senate Committee on Indian Affairs released its final report on the scandal. It said that Reed had used his contacts to conservative Christian groups to prevent the opening or expansion of casinos competing with the casinos operated by Abramoff's clients from 1998 to 2002 and had been paid $5.3 million through Abramoff's law firm and from organizations controlled by Abramoff's partner Michael Scanlon. The report did not accuse Reed of having known about Abramoff's illegal activities.

The report also says that under the guidance of the Mississippi Choctaw tribe's planner, Nell Rogers, the tribe agreed to launder money because "Ralph Reed did not want to be paid directly by a tribe with gaming interests", that Reed used nonprofits like Grover Norquist's Americans for Tax Reform as pass-throughs to disguise the funds' origin, and that "the structure was recommended by Jack Abramoff to accommodate Mr. Reed’s political concerns." Reed was never charged with any wrongdoing in the Indian gambling scandals.

=== Faith and Freedom Coalition ===
In 2009, Reed founded the Faith and Freedom Coalition, and as of 2025 continues to serve as its chairman.

== Publications ==
Reed has written seven books; four non-fiction and three fictional political thrillers.

- After the Revolution (1996, ISBN 978-0-8499-3859-7)
- Politically Incorrect: The Emerging Faith Factor in American Politics (1996, ISBN 978-90-71676-34-5)
- Active Faith: How Christians Are Changing the Face of American Politics (1996, ISBN 978-0-684-00304-7)
- Dark Horse: A Political Thriller (2010, ISBN 1-4391-8241-8)
- The Confirmation (2010, ISBN 1-4391-8241-8)
- Ballots and Blood (2011, ISBN 1-4336-6925-0)
- Awakening: How America Can Turn From Moral and Economic Destruction Back to Greatness (2014, ISBN 978-1-617-95287-6)
- For God and Country: The Christian Case For Trump (2020, ISBN 978-1684510573)

He has also written several articles.

- Reed, Ralph E. (1983). "'Fighting the Devil with Fire': Carl Vinson's Victory over Tom Watson in the 1918 Tenth District Democratic Primary". The Georgia Historical Quarterly. 67 (4): 451–479. JSTOR 40581142.
- Reed, Ralph E. (1988). "Emory College and the Sledd Affair of 1902: A Case Study in Southern Honor and Racial Attitudes". The Georgia Historical Quarterly. 72 (3): 463–492. JSTOR 40581859.
- Reed, Ralph E. (1988). "From Riots to Revivalism: the Gordon Riots of 1780, Methodist Hymnody, and the Halevy Thesis Revisited" (PDF). Methodist History. 26 (3): 172.
- Reed, Ralph E. (1993). "Casting a Wider Net: Religious Conservatives Move Beyond Abortion and Homosexuality". Policy Review. 65: 31.
- Reed, Ralph E. (December 17, 2012). "Conservatives Need Super PACs". National Review. 64: 18.

== See also ==
- Life of the Party: A Political Press Tart Bares All
- Christian right
