= CAAP =

CAAP is an acronym that may refer to:

- Civil Aviation Authority of the Philippines
- Clinical Associate in Applied Psychology, a type of British medical specialist; usually shortened to Clinical Associate (Psychology)
- Coalition of African American Pastors
- Communauté d'Agglomération du Pays d'Aix-en-Provence (Communes of the Bouches-du-Rhône department)
- Contemporary Asian Australian Performance, theatre company resident at Carriageworks in Sydney
