= Restoration Council =

Restoration Council may refer to:

- D'ni Restoration Council, a fictional organization in the Myst franchise
- State Law and Order Restoration Council (SLORC), name of State Peace and Development Council (the military regime of Burma) from 1988 to 1997

== See also ==
- Judeo-Christian Council for Constitutional Restoration, an American conservative religious organization formed in early 2005 that ran the defunct website StopActivistJudges.org
