= Tim Echols =

American politician (born 1960)

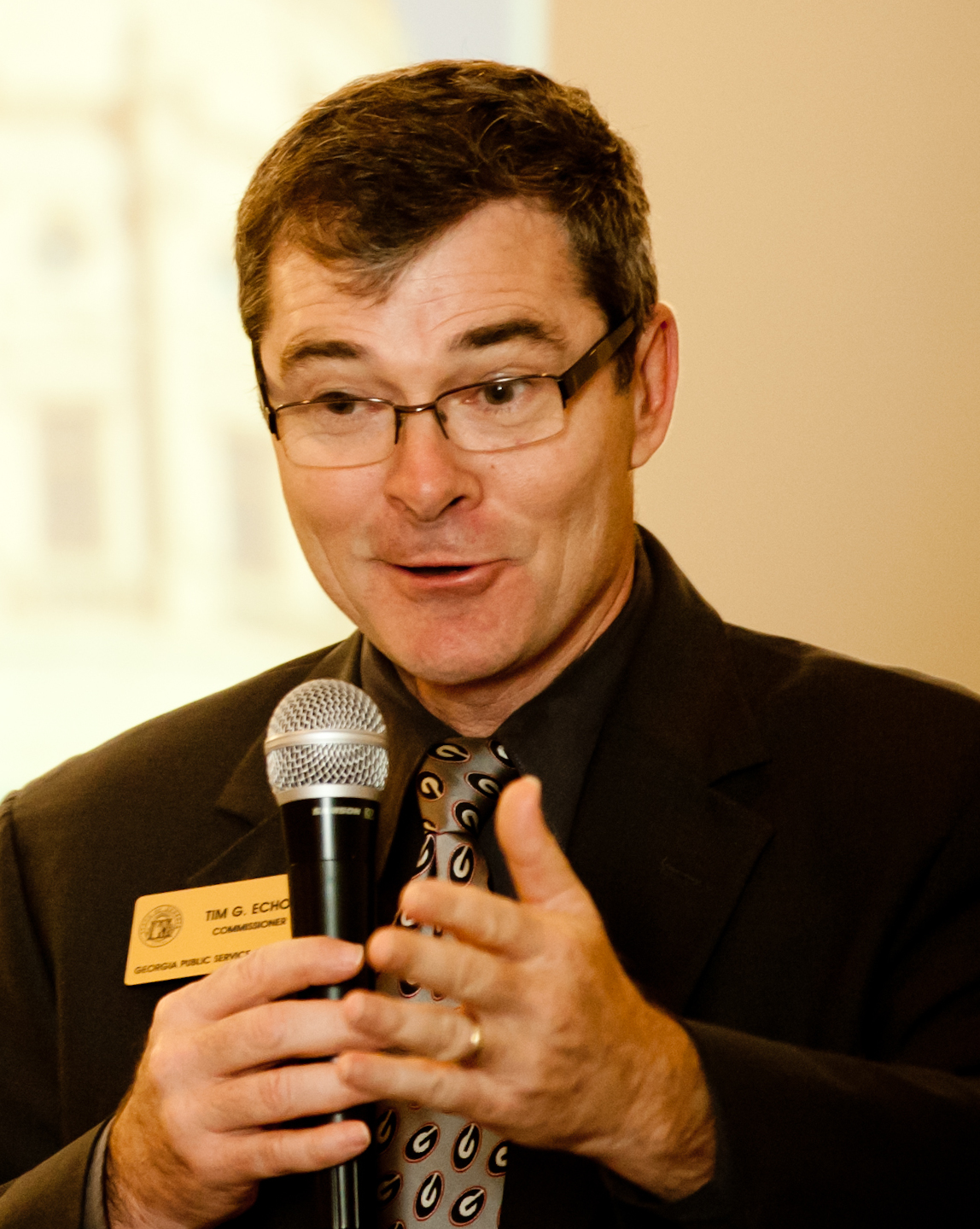

Member of the Georgia Public Service Commission from the 2nd district
- In office January 1, 2011 – January 1, 2026
- Governor: Nathan Deal; Brian Kemp
- Preceded by: Bobby Baker
- Succeeded by: Alicia Johnson

Personal details
- Born: Timothy Guy Echols; November 1, 1960 (age 65) Clayton County, Georgia, U.S.
- Party: Republican
- Spouse: Windy Davis
- Children: 7
- Education: University of Georgia (BA, MA, MA)

Tim Guy Echols (born November 1, 1960) is an American public official originally from Clayton County, Georgia, who was elected to the Athens-area seat on the Georgia Public Service Commission as a Republican in 2010. Echols unsuccessfully attempted to be appointed to the United States Senate in 2019. Echols served as vice-chairman of the commission prior to losing his seat in a 2025 special election. He is also the founder of the Christian non-profit educational ministry TeenPact.

== Political career ==
In 1994, Echols created the national non-profit, TeenPact, that began only in Georgia but now operates in 49 states.

Echols served on Governor Sonny Perdue's office of Children and Families for 5 years. He was treasurer and spokesperson for U.S. representative Paul Broun. In 2009, Echols was campaign manager and senior policy advisor for Republican gubernatorial candidate John Oxendine, who lost the Republican primary to Nathan Deal. In 2010, Echols won against Democratic candidate Keith Moffett in a race to become the Athens-area public service commissioner, after first defeating fellow Republicans Jeff May and Joey Brush in the primary, and then John Douglas in the primary run-off.

In December 2016, Echols won re-election to another six-year term as a commissioner. His campaign was focused around a promise to keep electric rates low and support renewable energy development. His second term began on January 1, 2017. In September 2019, Echols filed with Governor Brian Kemp's office for consideration to replace Senator Johnny Isakson. Kemp eventually appointed Kelly Loeffler to the open seat. Echols then proceeded to endorse Loeffler's campaign.

As of 2025, the majority of financial campaign contributions to Tim Echols are from individuals and companies associated with utilities the Public Service Commission regulates. According to the Energy & Policy Institute, this "raises conflict-of-interest concerns and reinforces patterns of regulatory capture." On November 4th, 2025, Echols lost re-election to Democrat Alicia Johnson.

=== Political positions ===
Echols supports fracking, and has also expressed support for a nuclear power plant located in Georgia, albeit with the caveat that the entire project be privatised. Additionally, he has expressed opposition to proposed EPA regulations regarding coal usage. Echols is a proponent of electric cars, and has called for expanded tax incentives for their ownership.

During the campaign for office, Echols opposed SB31, a 2008 bill by state lawmakers allowing Georgia Power to collect the finance costs for building a new nuclear power plant from its customers before construction is finished. Additionally, Echols has encouraged the recycling of nuclear waste. Echols has encouraged the completion of the Mixed Oxide Fuel facility at the Savannah River Site near Aiken, SC.

=== Controversies ===
In 2011, Echols, used an official Georgia Public Service Commission letterhead to request admission to the practice round of the Masters Golf Tournament over 11 months after entries to the ticket lottery were due, which caused accusations that he was using his position for personal gain. Echols claimed that this was due to his desire to spot check limousines and ensure that they were registered in Georgia. Echols eventually conceded that his actions were improper and he should not have requested the tickets.

In early 2014, Echols weighed in on the Georgia Right to Life controversy supporting Dan Becker and GRTL's leadership.

In 2018, subsequent to an investigation by the Energy and Policy Institute, a watchdog group filed an ethics complaint against Echols for violating Georgia’s Open Records Act. Echols appeared to have deleted text messages from his personal phone that could have contained conversations between Echols and Georgia Power prior to a vote on Plant Vogtle's continued construction.

In 2022, Echols was sued for violating the First Amendment rights of constituents by blocking them on social media for criticizing him.

== Personal life ==
Echols married Windy Davis Echols around 1982. They have 7 children. They live together in Atlanta, Georgia.

Political offices
Preceded by Bobby Baker	Member of the Georgia Public Service Commission from the 2nd district 2011–2026	Succeeded by Alicia Johnson
