= TeenPact =

American nonprofit organization

TeenPact Leadership Schools
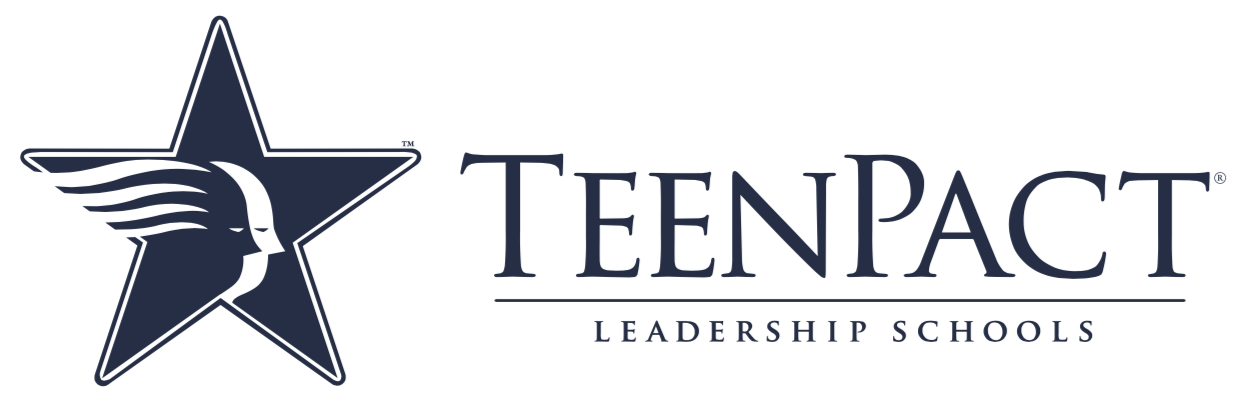
- Founded: 1994
- Founder: Tim Echols
- Type: non-profit, 501(c)(3)
- Purpose: Education focused on leadership and government, geared for young adults
- Location: Richmond, Virginia
- Region served: United States
- Method: Classes, workshops
- Key people: Peter Martin (former CEO), Chris May (CEO)
- Revenue: $1.6 million (in 2012)
- Volunteers: 200-300
- Website: teenpact.com

TeenPact Leadership Schools is a Christian right, non-profit, educational ministry, known for its teen-oriented programs on leadership, citizenship, and government. The organization teaches annual classes in the capitols of all 50 American states. Its vision statement/slogan is "Changing Lives to Change the World," and its mission statement is, "We seek to inspire youth in their relationship with Christ and train them to understand the political process, value their liberty, defend the Christian faith, and engage the culture at a time in their lives when, typically, they do not care about such things."

== Programs and events ==
TeenPact offers "state classes" and "alumni events," the former focusing on state government and politics, and the latter on a wide variety of topics. All students must complete their state's four-day State Class at least once before they can participate in alumni events.

=== The State Class ===
The State Class is the base level and foundation of the TeenPact organization. This class runs from Monday through Thursday of a given week at students' respective state capitols, is designed for students of ages 13 through 19, and is billed as a "hands-on learning experience." In this class, students participate in a variety of activities, encompassing many aspects of their particular state government as well as the Christian emphasis of the program. The class consists of student mock legislative sessions, learning how bills become law, field experiences (such as interviewing lobbyists), and special speakers (often state legislators or activists). On the Christian side of the program, students participate in worship sessions, bible study, and prayer walks through the various state capitols. Because of the on-site exams and pre-class homework, TeenPact describes its class as being worth one-third of a high-school carnegie unit. After completing the four-day State Class, a student is eligible to attend Alumni Events.

All students are required to wear what the ministry describes as "formal business attire" at their politically-oriented State Classes as well as parts of some Alumni Events. Men are required to wear a suit and tie, and women must wear blazers with pants or a skirt that reaches below the knee. During events that do not take place in a "professional environment", dress codes are much more relaxed for both sexes, and casual attire is permitted.

TeenPact also offers a One Day State Class (formerly known as "TeenyPact") for younger students. It is a branch of the four-day class, held on Friday immediately following TeenPact "graduation". This class is designed as a compact and simplified version of the longer class, tailored to students ages 8 through 12. It includes many of the events of the upper level in a more age appropriate and fast-paced environment.

A Political Communication Workshop, also known as PCW (formerly a Public Speaking Class), is offered as an extension of the week for four-day students, and is also held on the Friday following the normal TeenPact program, occurring simultaneously with the one-day class. In the workshop, the older students are developed and polished in the simple fundamentals of oratory, including eye contact, stage movement and gestures, speech writing, impromptu speaking, and the basics of civilized debate, as well as drafting mock resolutions similar to mock legislation drafted during the State Class.

=== Alumni events ===
Once a student has attended the Four Day Class, he or she is classified as a "TeenPact Alumnus" and is eligible for participation in any of the several additional events TeenPact offers.

The largest Alumni event in terms of participation is TeenPact's National Convention (commonly referred to as "NatCon"). The week-long event includes speakers, worship sessions, small group activities, and sports tournaments including Ultimate Frisbee, volleyball, basketball, and student elections. Students run in national elections for various mock positions, including President and Vice-President, Senator, and Representative. This aspect of the event immerses students into the campaign process, with candidates creating social media accounts, T-shirts, flyers, posters, and commercials. The entire elections process is tracked from primaries to the general election via a live news program, "TPN News."

TeenPact also offers week-long events focused on the three branches of government. TeenPact Congress, held at the Florida State Capitol, immerses students into the legislative process, complete with elected officials, lobbyists, and journalists. TeenPact Back to DC, held at the Leadership Institute in Arlington, Virginia, offers a more comprehensive curriculum on campaigning, which students use to run mock presidential campaigns. In addition to this, students commute to downtown Washington, D.C., daily, where they have the opportunity to visit Capitol Hill, tour monuments and museums, and attend political conferences such as the Values Voter Summit (which Back to DC is usually scheduled around). Finally, TeenPact Judicial is a legal-oriented course held at Liberty University School of Law, which includes lectures from various presenters and a moot court. TeenPact is an independent non-profit organization unaffiliated with a political party.

Two of TeenPact's Alumni events – Venture and Endeavor – are not politically oriented, and are run in the tradition of a summer camp for boys and girls respectively.

== Staff ==
TeenPact is run through several tiers of administration. A board of directors has executive control of the organization, with John Seldenrust serving as chairman of the board. A separate staff of employees in Richmond, Virginia, headed by CEO Chris May, directs the state classes and handles public relations. However, the bulk of TeenPact's field staff responsible for executing classes is composed of two sets of volunteers. A group of traveling student interns is assembled each year to travel to and lead each state's classes, while individual staffing volunteers – student alumni selected via an applications process – stay in their home state or travel at their own expense to assist in leading the class. Whether an intern within the multi-state group or an individual in a single state, TeenPact volunteers are required to have attended the four-day class held in their state at least once. Traveling interns must also have previously staffed a state class, and have had sufficient experience with the Alumni programs.

== Political activity ==
TeenPact students occasionally organize "Student Projects," which may involve a political activity or other types of volunteering. TeenPact's founder, Tim Echols, was on one occasion the subject of questions regarding the ethicality of TeenPact students working on a political campaign (John Oxendine's unsuccessful 2010 Georgia gubernatorial campaign). A formal ethics complaint was filed against Echols, then serving as Oxendine's campaign manager, alleging that his Gold Dome Consulting firm improperly benefited from TeenPact volunteers. The complaint was found to be without merit, and was dismissed.

More recent TeenPact publications note the ministry's status as a 501(c)(3) nonprofit organization and clarify that "Student Projects are organized by parents and/or students, not the ministry itself." The "Student Project" moniker may therefore be applied not only to political campaigns, but also to a number of service and volunteering opportunities available to TeenPact alums.

Tim Echols has stepped back from the day-to-day operations of the organization in order to serve as a commissioner on the State of Georgia's Public Service Commission.

== Partnerships ==
- Family Resource Network, Inc. (of which TeenPact is a subsidiary d/b/a)
- CollegePlus! (2014 State Class sponsor)
- Heritage Action for America (2014 State Class sponsor)
- Worldview Academy (2014 State Class sponsor)
- Americans for Prosperity (2014 National Convention sponsor)
- Patrick Henry College (2014 National Convention sponsor)
- Young America's Foundation (2014 National Convention sponsor)
- Rivendell Sanctuary (2014 National Convention sponsor)
- 412 Foundation - Stephen Morrison, director (PAC formed in 2012–13 to help TeenPact alums get elected to state legislatures)

== Notable alumni ==
- Josh Cockroft, Member of the Oklahoma House of Representatives (2011–2018)
- Elise Hall, Member of the Oklahoma House of Representatives (2011–2018)
- Nels S.D. Peterson, justice on the Georgia Supreme Court (Since 2017)
- Jennifer Sullivan, Member of the Florida House of Representatives (2014–2020)
- Sam Teasley, Member of the Georgia House of Representatives (2011–2019)
- Sarah Laszloffy, Member of the Montana House of Representatives (2013–2017)
- Jenna Ellis, Legal advisor to Donald Trump
