= Alicia Johnson =

American politician

Member of the Georgia Public Service Commission from the 2nd district
- Incumbent
- Assumed office January 1, 2026
- Governor: Brian Kemp; Keisha Lance Bottoms (elect)
- Preceded by: Tim Echols

Personal details
- Born: 1972 or 1973 (age 53–54) Savannah, Georgia, U.S.
- Party: Democratic
- Education: Armstrong State University (BA); University of Phoenix (MA); Northcentral University (PhD)
- Website: Campaign website

Alicia M. Johnson (born 1972/1973) is an American politician who currently serves as a member of the Georgia Public Service Commission. Elected in 2025, she became the first Black woman in Georgia to serve in a statewide elected executive office. She ran on a platform focused on consumer protection, clean energy, and transparency.

== Early life ==
Johnson is a native of Savannah, Georgia.

== Career ==
Johnson has a background in human services, healthcare, economic development, and advocacy. She serves as the Georgia Managing Principal at Health Management Associates, where she leads strategy on national projects focused on equity and sustainable development. She has led initiatives that helped over 10,000 Georgia households access employment, public benefits, and financial literacy resources.

=== Georgia Public Service Commission ===
On April 4, 2025, Johnson announced her candidacy as a Democrat for the Georgia Public Service Commission (PSC) District 2 seat at an event at Carver State Bank in Savannah. The district covers a portion of East Georgia. Johnson ran unopposed for the Democratic nomination in the June 17 primary. In the November 4, 2025, general election, she faced Republican incumbent Tim Echols.

Johnson ran on a "people-centered" platform focused on transparency, consumer protection, and the advancement of clean, affordable energy. Her campaign, along with other Democrats, centered on frustration over six recent rate hikes approved by the all-Republican commission, which had increased the average residential bill by approximately $500 annually. Johnson specifically aimed to "rein in the $44/month increase on power bills" approved since 2022. She stated she would "fight unchecked rate hikes that hurt working families" and "advocate for ratepayer protections."

A chief concern for her campaign was the high energy costs for Georgians living in poverty, with Johnson stating that residents were "already paying some of the highest energy bills in the country." Johnson advocated for expanding renewable energy options, including solar (both rooftop and community), wind, battery storage, and microgrids, calling them "clean, cost-effective solutions." Her platform included addressing the rising power demands from data centers and ensuring that rural and underserved communities were not left behind in the energy transition.

On November 4, 2025, Johnson defeated Echols in the special election. She claimed victory at 8:17 p.m. Johnson won with 62.7% of the vote to Echols' 37.3%. Echols congratulated Johnson on "a well-fought fight." The win made Johnson the first black woman in Georgia to serve in statewide elective executive office. Johnson will be eligible to run for re-election to a full six-year term in 2030.

Political offices
Preceded by Tim Echols	Member of the Georgia Public Service Commission from the 2nd district 2026–present	Incumbent
