= 1998 Georgia state elections =

1998 Georgia elections
- November 4, 1998

== State elections ==
The 1998 elections saw the first elections of African American candidates and of a woman candidate to statewide office.

=== Governor ===
Democratic State Senator Roy Barnes defeated Secretary of State Lewis A. Massey to win the Democratic primary. Running on the themes of education reform and health care reform, Barnes defeated Republican businessman Guy Millner in the general election with a victory of 52% to 44% to become the 80th Governor of Georgia.

=== Lieutenant Governor ===
Democratic State Senator Mark Taylor defeated Republican candidate Mitch Skandalakis and took office on January 11, 1999.

=== Attorney General ===
Appointed to the position the previous year, Democratic incumbent Attorney General Thurbert Baker ran unopposed in the Democratic primary. With 50.9% of the vote, he defeated Republican State Representative David Ralston (45.3%) and Libertarian candidate Walker Chandler (3.8%) to win a full term, becoming one of the first two African American state Attorney General in Georgia.

=== Secretary of State ===
Democratic State Representative Cathy Cox ran for Georgia Secretary of State in 1998 and defeated Republican candidate John A. McCallum with 56.6% of the vote, becoming the 25th Secretary of State of Georgia and the first woman elected to the position.

=== Labor Commissioner ===
Democratic State Representative Mike Thurmond defeated Republican candidate John F. Collins 52.7-47.3.

=== Insurance and Fire Commissioner ===
Republican incumbent John Oxendine defeated Democratic State Representative Henrietta Canty and Libertarian candidate Joshua Batcheler.

=== School Superintendent ===
Republican incumbent Linda Schrenko defeated Democratic candidate Joe Martin and Libertarian Michael Cartwright.

=== Public Service Commission ===
In the first election for the PSC to use "residency districts" for the at-large seats, Republican incumbent Bobby Baker defeated Democratic candidate Anna Hargis for a second term. In a special election to succeed Dave Baker, Democrat Lauren "Bubba" McDonald defeated Jim Cole and Jim Kulstad.

=== Georgia General Assembly ===
Members were elected to the 145th Georgia General Assembly.
