= Jim Beck (politician) =

American politician (born 1961)

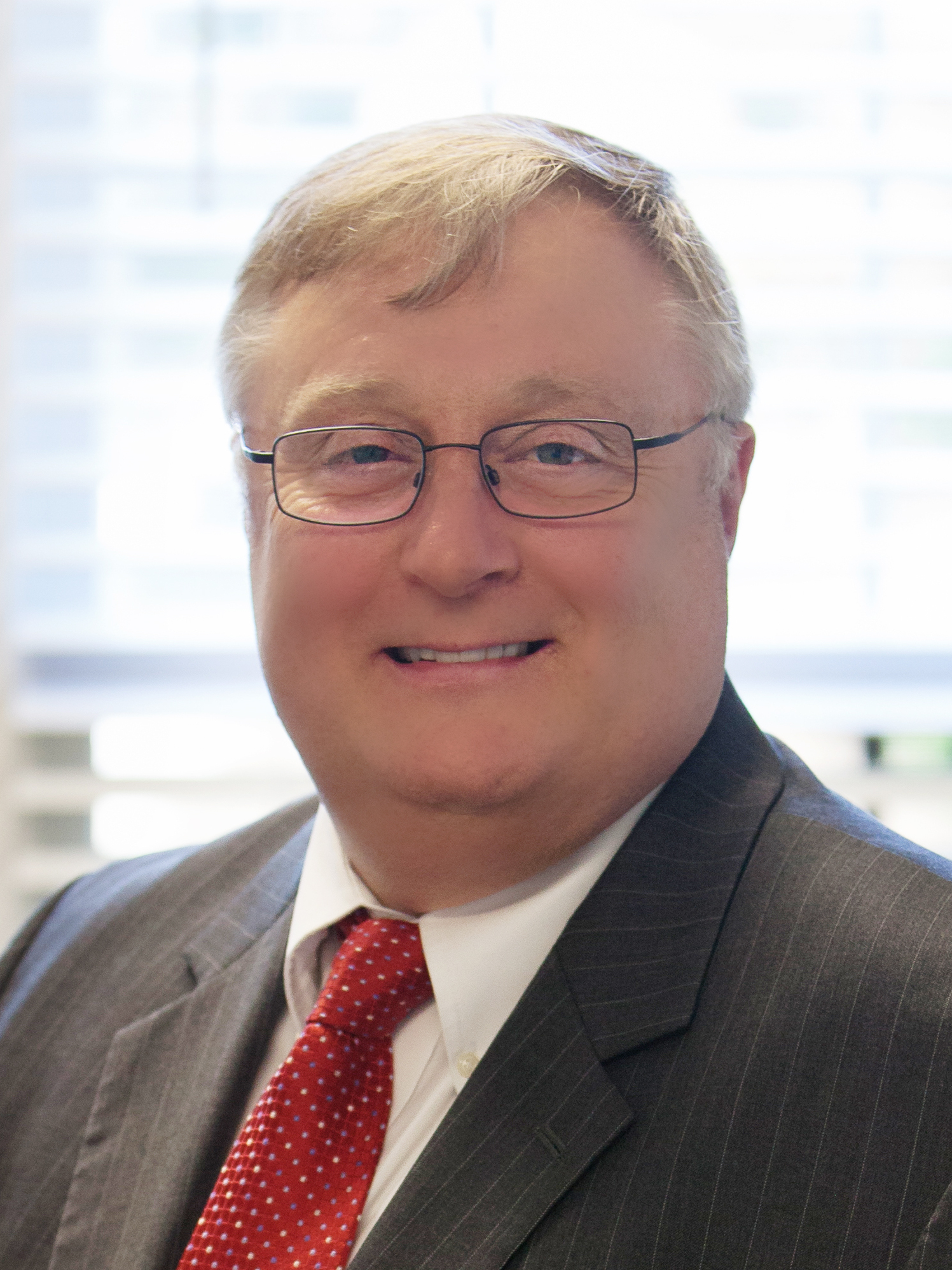

Insurance Commissioner of Georgia
- In office January 14, 2019 – July 22, 2021; Suspended: May 16, 2019 – July 22, 2021
- Governor: Brian Kemp
- Preceded by: Ralph Hudgens
- Succeeded by: John King

Personal details
- Born: September 29, 1961 (age 65) Douglasville, Georgia, U.S.
- Party: Republican
- Spouse: Lucy Beck
- Education: University of West Georgia (BA)

Jim C. Beck (born September 1961) is an American politician who formerly served as the Insurance Commissioner of Georgia. Beck previously served as the Deputy Insurance Commissioner of Georgia to former Insurance Commissioner John Oxendine.

In August 2017, Beck announced he would run to replace Ralph Hudgens as the Insurance and Safety Fire Commissioner of Georgia.

He was suspended by Governor Brian Kemp in 2019 pending an investigation into allegations of illegal activity committed prior to his taking office. Beck was convicted of 37 counts of fraud and money laundering on July 22, 2021, which triggered his full, immediate removal from office. He was succeeded officially by John King, whom Kemp appointed on an interim basis in 2019 pending the outcome of Beck's investigation.

== Early life ==
Jim Beck was born in Douglasville, Georgia. He graduated from the University of West Georgia with a bachelor of arts degree in marketing.

== Political career ==
Beck's first role in public service was as Deputy Insurance and Safety Fire Commissioner for the State of Georgia. Later he served as the Chief of Staff for Insurance Commissioner Ralph Hudgens. In August 2017 Beck announced his candidacy for the office of Insurance Commissioner in Georgia in 2018.

On May 14, 2019, while Insurance Commissioner, a federal grand jury indicted Beck for fraud, as he was alleged to have embezzled more than $2 million from the Georgia Underwriting Association from February 2013 through August 2018. Beck was elected Commissioner in 2018, after previously serving as general manager of operations for the Georgia Underwriting Association. His trial was set to begin July 12, 2021.

On May 16, 2019, Governor Brian Kemp issued an executive order suspending Beck from office at Beck’s request pending the outcome of the ongoing investigation. The state spent about $200,000 a year on Beck’s salary and benefits while he was suspended. He was convicted on 37 counts of fraud and money laundering on July 22, 2021. On October 12, 2021, he was sentenced to seven years and three months in prison for fraud and money laundering. After a court hearing on October 16, 2023, federal judge Mark Cohen reduced his sentence by nine months to six years and six months. This was not for good behavior but because he had no prior criminal history. While his sentence was reduced, he still owes millions of dollars in restitution. He is expected to be released in April 2028.

Party political offices
Preceded by Ralph Hudgens	Republican nominee for Insurance Commissioner of Georgia; 2018	Succeeded by John F. King
Political offices
Preceded by Ralph Hudgens	Insurance Commissioner of Georgia; 2019–2021; Suspended: 2019–2021	Succeeded by John King
