= Life of the Party: A Political Press Tart Bares All =

2011 memoir by Lisa Baron

- First edition
- Author: Lisa Baron
- Language: English
- Genre: Memoir
- Publisher: Citadel Press
- Publication date: 2011
- Publication place: United States

Life of the Party: A Political Press Tart Bares All is a 2011 memoir by Lisa Baron describing her time as a spokesperson for Ralph Reed.

Lisa (Baron) Shore is a former spokesperson for Ralph Reed, who did not share many of his political views; even though the people she worked for were fundamentalist Christian, she was Jewish.

Content about her work with Reed makes up the majority of the book. She stated that the book reveals previously secret information, including Reed's view of the Jack Abramoff Indian lobbying scandal and Baron's sexual life; it describes an encounter with Ari Fleischer. The book also chronicles her political work with Christine Todd Whitman; Baron made negative statements about Whitman, including some Stephen Lowman of the Washington Post stated "violate this website’s standards of decency." Kirkus Reviews stated that the sexual encounters "seem almost quaint" since there was a "long list of prominent conservatives who have been caught doing much worse".

As of 2009 the author was married to Jimmy Baron, a host of a radio program.

== Reception ==
Foster Kamer of Gawker stated that the "great" book, described as one of several "political tell-alls", "is the Republican version of Primary Colors and Coyote Ugly meeting in the middle."

Kirkus Reviews described the book as "A misguided focus on sex and booze overshadows the moments of insight and inspiration." It criticized the focus on social life over day-to-day life in politics.

Michelle Goldberg, an opinion columnist for The New York Times, characterized the book as "a self-portrait of a cynical, fame-hungry narcissist". On December 3, 2018, The New York Times published a response by Baron.
