= Georgia Chamber of Commerce =

The Georgia Chamber of Commerce is a statewide business organization headquartered in Atlanta, Georgia. It engages in policy advocacy and economic development initiatives on behalf of businesses operating in Georgia.

== History ==
The chamber of commerce was founded as the Georgia Manufacturing Association in 1915. It was renamed to the Associated Industries of Georgia in 1939, the Georgia Business and Industry Association in 1968, the Business Council of Georgia in 1983, and its current name in 1992.

Throughout its history, the chamber has formed partnerships with various organizations, including Leadership Georgia in 1971, the Georgia Self-Insurers Association in 1975, the Georgia Partnership for Excellence in Education in 1990, the Georgia Employers' Association in 2003, the Council on Alcohol and Drugs' "Drugs Don't Work" program in 2004, and the Tourism Development Alliance of Georgia, also in 2004. These partnerships cover areas such as workforce development, employer services, education, and tourism.

Chris Clark has served as the Georgia Chamber's President and CEO since 2010.

The Chamber employs approximately 47 staff members who work in departments including operations, member services, government affairs, public policy, and communications. It also works with volunteers from Georgia businesses who serve on its board of directors, the government affairs council, and policy committees.

== Lobbying efforts ==
The Georgia Chamber of Commerce has an in-house lobbying team that advocates for legislation affecting Georgia businesses, including water management, tax incentives, sales tax holidays, and civil justice reform.

On March 12, 2021, the Chamber issued a statement opposing Republican election reforms that would end no-excuse absentee voting, limit early voting hours, restrict drop boxes for mail ballots, and curtail early voting on Sundays.

== Events ==
=== The Georgia Initiative ===
The Georgia Initiative, originally launched in 2007, was a 5-year campaign that coordinated the Chamber's policy positions across multiple areas. These include Education and Workforce Development, Environment and Energy, Health Care, Tax Policy, Tourism, and Transportation.

=== The Red Carpet Tour and Georgia Quail Hunt ===
The Red Carpet Tour and Georgia Quail Hunt are annual events hosted by the Georgia Chamber of Commerce in partnership with the Georgia Department of Economic Development. These events are attended by business executives to discuss economic development in Georgia. Past participants that subsequently relocated their corporate headquarters to Georgia include Georgia-Pacific and NCR.

The Red Carpet Tour is held each year in April and has been in existence since 1959. Participants visit Augusta each year to attend the Masters Golf Tournament. A second location differs from year to year to allow further exploration of the state. These locations have included Albany, Athens, Atlanta, Columbus, Dalton, Gainesville, Rome, Savannah, and Valdosta.

The Georgia Quail Hunt began in 1988, and it is held each year in southwest Georgia. Guests participate in quail hunting and shooting instructions on nine different southern plantations while networking with Georgia business leaders and legislators. Originally called the Fall Feather Hunt, the name was changed to the Georgia Quail Hunt to reflect the change in the time of year when the event was held.
