= John F. King =

American National Guard officer and government official

John King
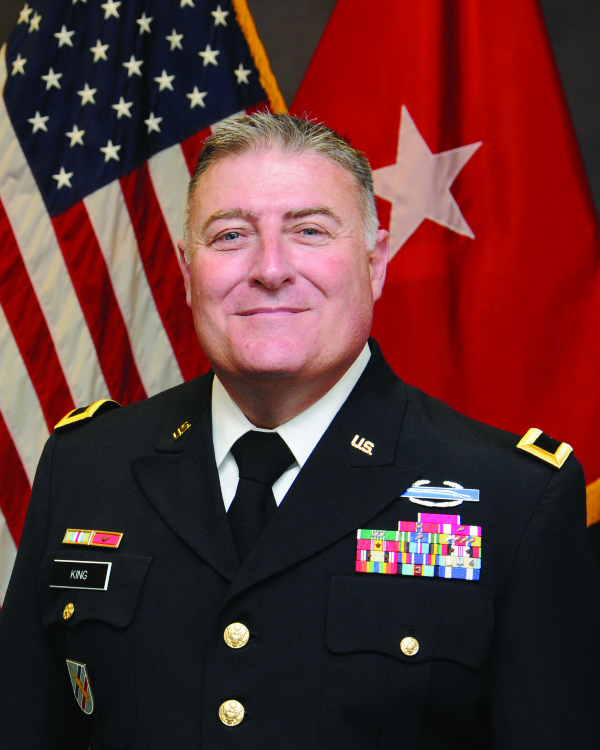
- Official portrait, c. 2014

Insurance Commissioner of Georgia
- Incumbent
- Assumed office July 1, 2019; Acting: July 1, 2019 – July 22, 2021
- Governor: Brian Kemp
- Preceded by: Jim Beck

Personal details
- Born: 1963 or 1964 (age 62–63) Mexico City, Mexico
- Party: Republican
- Education: Brenau University (BA); United States Army War College (MS)
- Website: Office website Campaign website

Military service
- Allegiance: United States
- Branch/service: United States Army
- Years of service: 1985–2023
- Rank: Major General
- Unit: United States National Guard
- Commands: Contingency Command Post 1 Task Force 51; 48th Infantry Brigade Combat Team; 1st Battalion, 108th Armor Regiment
- Battles/wars: War in Afghanistan; Iraq War
- Awards: Army Distinguished Service Medal; Legion of Merit; Bronze Star (2)

John F. King (born 1963/1964) is an American politician serving since 2019 as Georgia's insurance commissioner and Safety Fire Commissioner. He was appointed by Governor Brian Kemp as commissioner on July 1, 2019, replacing Jim Beck after Beck's removal from office. King was re-elected to this position in 2022. King's appointment made him the first Hispanic statewide official in Georgia's history. He is a Republican.

Earlier in his career, King served as the chief of police for Doraville, Georgia, after becoming an Atlanta police officer in 1985. King served as a major general in the United States National Guard. He was deployed three times. As part of his National Guard duties, he served on a coronavirus pandemic response team.

In May 2025, King announced his candidacy in the 2026 United States Senate election in Georgia. He withdrew from the race in July 2025, after meeting with Georgia Governor Brian Kemp, who went on to endorse former football coach Derek Dooley.

In the November 3, 2026 general election, King lost his re-election bid to Democratic challenger Keisha Sean Waites.

== Education ==
King received a bachelor's degree in criminal justice and public administration from Brenau University and a master's degree in strategic studies from the United States Army War College. He is also a graduate of the FBI National Academy in Quantico, Virginia, and a graduate of the Georgia International Law Enforcement Exchange program to Israel (GILEE) which was started in preparation for the 1996 Olympic Games in Atlanta as a way to enhance cooperation between Georgia's law enforcement agencies and the Israeli police force, especially in the areas of counter-terrorism and drug interdiction.

== Military career ==
King served as a major general in the United States National Guard. He was the commander of the 48th Infantry Brigade Combat Team. King has been deployed to Bosnia-Herzegovina, Iraq, and Afghanistan where he served as a military advisor to the Deputy Minister of Interior for Security for Afghanistan who oversaw an agency of almost 100,000 police officers.

In 2020, during the COVID-19 pandemic, King was called back to National Guard duty at Fort Sam Houston in San Antonio, Texas. He helped build field hospitals in New Orleans and in New Jersey at Edison and Newark. King was asked by Governor Kemp to serve on Georgia's Coronavirus Task Force and lead the Emergency Preparedness Committee, which makes sure that there is proper supply equipment. As Insurance and Safety Fire Commissioner, he has asked health insurers not to cancel health policies for non-payment until further notice and for insurers to waive all co-payments for COVID-19 testing.

== Awards and decorations ==
- Army Distinguished Service Medal
- Legion of Merit
- Bronze Medal (with 1 Bronze Oak Leaf Cluster)
- Combat Infantryman Badge
- Meritorious Service Medal (with 1 Bronze Oak Leaf Cluster)
- NATO award for his service in both Bosnia and Afghanistan
- Army Commendation Medal (with 2 Bronze Oak Leaf Clusters)
- Army Achievement Medal (with 1 Bronze Oak Leaf Cluster)
- Joint Meritorious Unit Award
- Army Meritorious Unit Commendation
- Army Reserve Components Achievement Medal (with 1 Silver and 3 Bronze Oak Leaf Clusters)
- National Defense Service Medal (with 1 Bronze Service Star)
- Armed Forces Expeditionary Medal
- Afghanistan Campaign Medal (with 2 Bronze Service Stars)
- Iraq Campaign Medal (with 2 Bronze Service Stars)
- Global War on Terrorism Service Medal
- Armed Forces Reserve Medal (with Gold Hourglass, M Device and Numeral 4)
- Army Service Ribbon
- Overseas Service Ribbon (with Numeral 3)
- North Atlantic Treaty Organization Medal (with 1 Bronze Star)
- Georgia Commendation Medal
- Georgia National Guard Service Medal
- Georgia Special Operations Ribbon
- Georgia State Active Duty Ribbon
- Combat Infantryman Badge
- Combat Action Badge
- El Salvador gold medal for achievement (El Salvador)
- Chief's Blue Star, injury in the line of duty (Atlanta Police Department)

== Promotions ==
Second Lieutenant, June 29, 1985
First Lieutenant, June 29, 1988
Captain, November 27, 1990
Major, August 1, 1997
Lieutenant Colonel, September 25, 2002
Colonel, March 20, 2007
Brigadier General, April 1, 2013
Major General, February 1, 2018

== See also ==
- COVID-19 pandemic in the state of Georgia

Party political offices
Preceded by Jim Beck	Republican nominee for Insurance Commissioner of Georgia; 2022, 2026	Most recent
Political offices
Preceded by Jim Beck	Insurance Commissioner of Georgia; 2019–present Acting: 2019–2021	Incumbent
