= 2000 Georgia state elections =

2000 Georgia elections
- November 7, 2000

== State elections ==
=== Georgia General Assembly ===
Members were elected to the 146th Georgia General Assembly.

=== Georgia Public Service Commission ===
Incumbent Democrat David Burgess defeated Republican Al Bartell and Libertarian Dick Withington for District 3. Incumbent Republican Stan Wise defeated Democrat Jim Boyd and Libertarian Wayne Parker for District 5. This was the first PSC election to use residency districts.
