= Bullfeathers =

Coordinates: 38°53′4.7″N 77°0′20.3″W

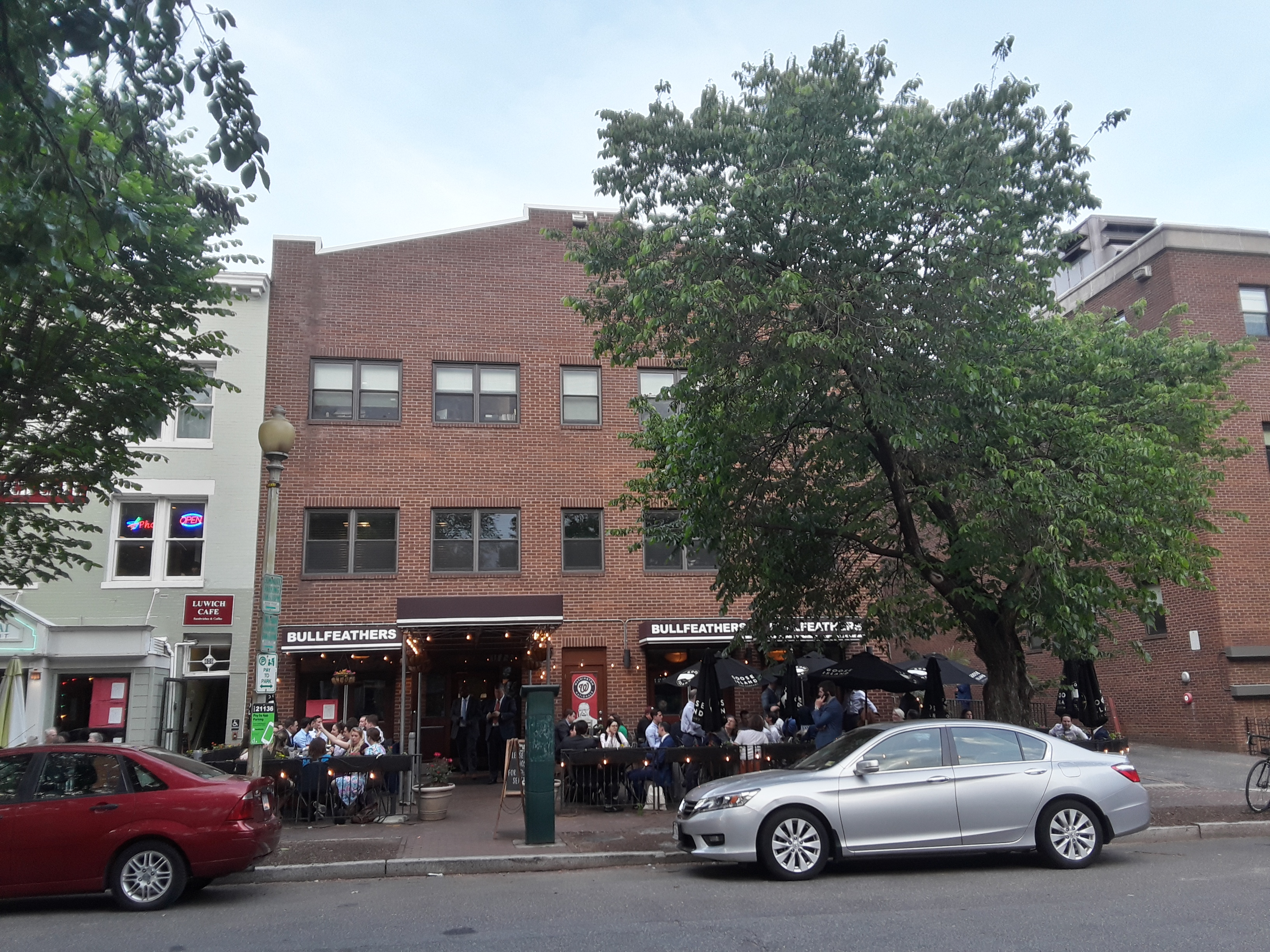
Bullfeathers in May 2019

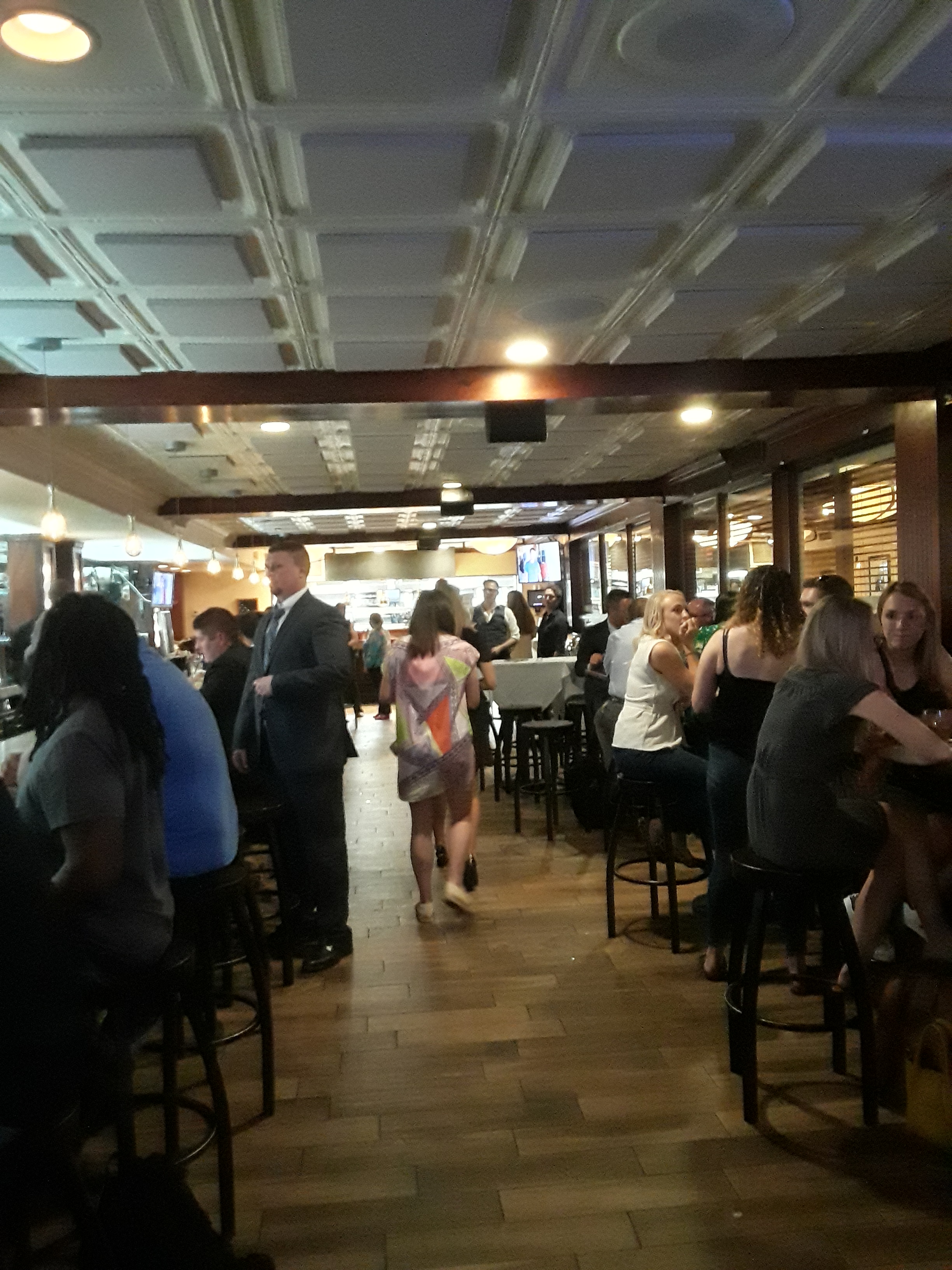
Restaurant interior

Bullfeathers of Capitol Hill is a restaurant and bar on 410 First Street SE in Washington, D.C., in the Capitol Hill neighborhood. Its name comes from President Theodore Roosevelt's favorite euphemism for "bullshit." The logo of the restaurant is a depiction of Roosevelt. It was founded in 1979 by Gordon King. It has achieved some degree of fame for its association with congressional staffers and members who have been patrons, and as a place where "lobbyists take Hill staffers to down martinis.". It has since reopened under new ownership. The new owners are Tony Harris and William Walls.

The restaurant has been variously described as "one of Capitol Hill's key upscale watering holes" and "a favorite House-side dive.". Bullfeathers, Capital Hill is also the location of the Annual SWTA Legislative Breakfast.

The political website PoliticsPA named it to their list of restaurants frequented by politicians.

The restaurant also figured in the Mark Foley scandal. Reports indicated that Mark Foley approached a former 18-year-old intern at Bullfeathers and asked for an email.
