= Vision America =

Conservative American Christian organization

Vision America logo

Vision America is a conservative American Christian organization founded in 1994 by Baptist pastor Rick Scarborough, which describes itself as formed to "inform, encourage and mobilize pastors and their congregations to be proactive in restoring Judeo-Christian values to the moral and civic framework in their communities, states, and our nation."

== 2006 War on Christians Conference ==
The conference was held on March 26 and 27 2006 in Washington, DC. Speakers included former United States House of Representatives majority leader Tom DeLay (R-Tex.) and Senators John Cornyn (R-Tex.) and Sam Brownback (R-Kan.) as well as conservative Christian leaders Phyllis Schlafly, Rod Parsley, Gary Bauer, Janet Parshall and Alan Keyes.

Topics discussed include:

- Christian Persecution: Reports From The Frontlines
- The Gay Agenda: America Won’t Be Happy
- The ACLU And Radical Secularism: Driving God From Our Public Life.
