= Judeo-Christian Council for Constitutional Restoration =

Conservative religious organization

The Judeo-Christian Council for Constitutional Restoration was a conservative, religious organization formed in early 2005 that ran the website StopActivistJudges.org. By February 28, 2013, the domain had expired and been acquired by a domain parking company.

The council descended from the Dallas Group. Rick Scarborough took the chairman position. The council's executive director was Philip Jauregui, former counsel to Chief Justice Roy Moore. In April 2005, Scarborough was quoted as saying that his group was needed because of, "Activist judges...(whose) distortions of the Constitution have brought us abortion-on-demand, purged religious symbols from public places, made our schools faith-free zones, created a so-called right to homosexual sodomy and threatened 'one nation under God' in the pledge of allegiance. Now, judges seem intent on imposing same-sex marriage by fiat." According to the group's website, "Each progressive step down the road to the secularization of America has come not through a referendum of the people, or an act of their elected representatives, but rather at the stroke of a judge’s pen."

== Confronting The Judicial War On Faith ==
The group's April 2005 conference, Confronting The Judicial War On Faith, attracted many prominent conservatives. According to the Washington Post, "The two-day program listed two House members; aides to two senators; representatives from the Family Research Council and Concerned Women for America; conservative activists Alan Keyes and Morton C. Blackwell; the lawyer for Terri Schiavo's parents; Alabama's "Ten Commandments" judge, Roy Moore; and [Rep. Tom] DeLay, who canceled to attend the pope's funeral." The event brought together lawmakers and Capitol Hill staffers with theocrats, adherents of Christian Reconstructionism, a Calvinist doctrine that calls for the biblical law to rule American law.

In a session titled "Remedies to Judicial Tyranny," constitutional lawyer Edwin Vieira discussed United States Supreme Court justice Anthony Kennedy's majority opinion in Lawrence v. Texas, which struck down that state's anti-sodomy law. Kennedy was accused of relying on "Marxist, Leninist, Satanic principles drawn from foreign law" in his jurisprudence.

According to the group's website, "April 7–8 proved to be a divine appointment. There was no way of knowing, humanly speaking, how significant that time would be in the life of our Republic"; Schiavo had died and "the federal judiciary, up to and including the United States Supreme Court, also turned a deaf ear to repeated pleas to save Terri." The group claims that the conference was responsible for creating "a movement... to restore the Constitution to its true meaning and original glory."

== Books ==
- Judicial Tyranny: The New Kings of America? by Mark Sutherland 2005. ISBN 0-9753455-6-7 Features conservative perspectives on the United States judicial system from Mark Sutherland, US Attorney General Ed Meese, Ambassador Alan Keyes, Dave Meyer, Phyllis Schlafly, Howard Phillips, Alan Sears, William Federer, Ben DuPre, Rick Scarborough, David Gibbs, Mathew Staver, Don Feder, Roy Moore, James Dobson and Herb Titus.
