= Faith and Freedom Coalition =

American conservative political advocacy organization

Coordinates: 33°56′45″N 84°07′41″W

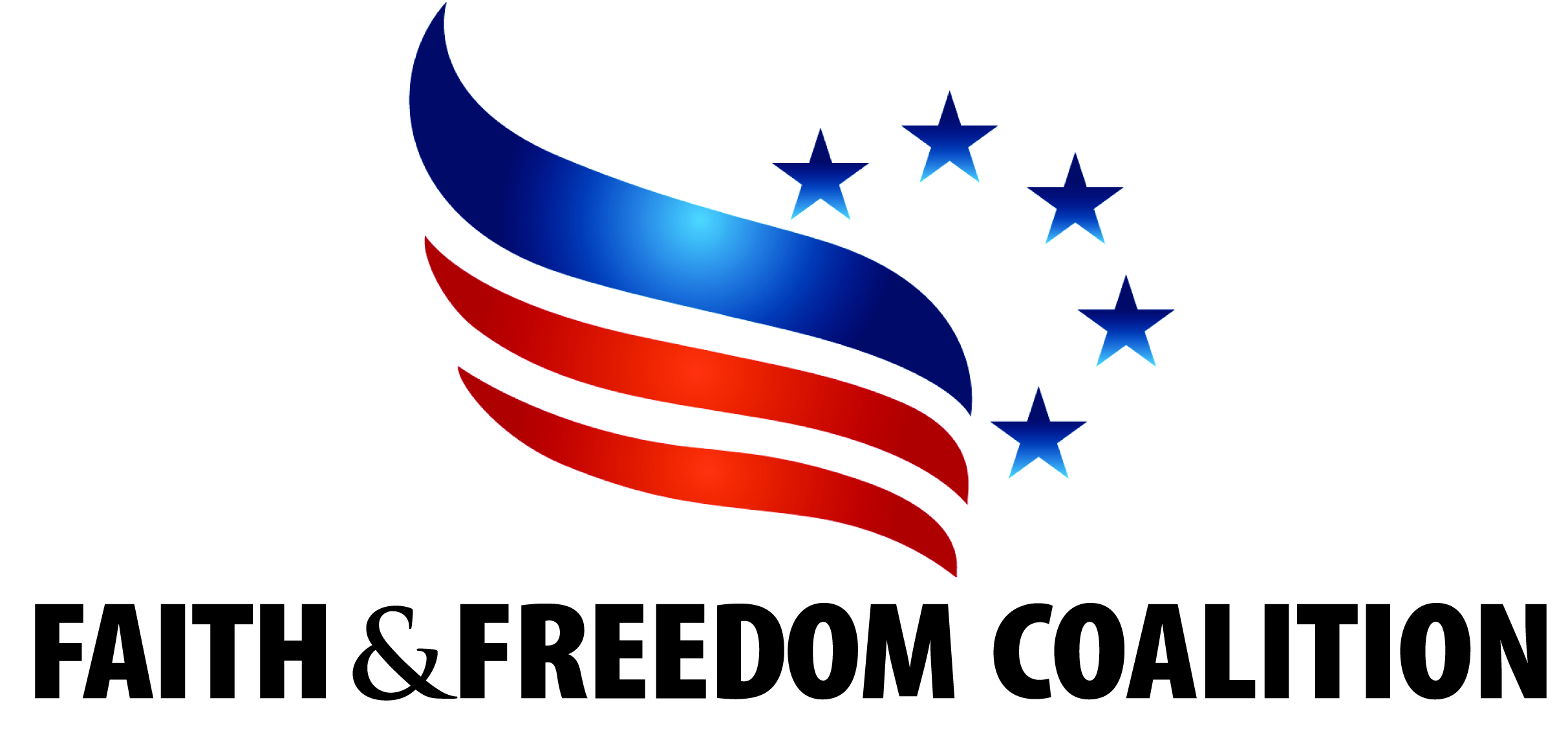
- Abbreviation: FFC
- Founded: 14 May 2009 (17 years ago)
- Founder: Ralph Reed
- Type: nonprofit
- Tax ID no.: 27-0182697
- Legal status: 501(c)(4)
- Purpose: Social conservatism; Political advocacy
- Headquarters: Ste 975; 3700 Crestwood Pkwy NW; Duluth, GA 30096-7212; United States
- Region served: United States
- Chairman: Ralph Reed
- Executive Director: Timothy Head
- Subsidiaries: Freedom and Values Alliance Inc. _{(501(c)(4))}, Faith and Freedom Action _{(527)}
- Revenue: $24,429,473 (2022)
- Expenses: $26,653,399 (2022)
- Employees: 17 (2015)
- Volunteers: 0 (2015)
- Website: www.ffcoalition.com

The Faith and Freedom Coalition (FFC) is a conservative political advocacy 501(c)(4) non-profit organization in the United States.

== Organization ==
=== History ===
The organization was founded and officially incorporated on 14 May 2009, by Christian Coalition founder Ralph Reed, who described it as "a 21st century version of the Christian Coalition". Reed designed the coalition as a bridge between the Tea Party movement and evangelical voters. The organization has grown quickly with hundreds of thousands of supporters and several hundred local chapters. Reed and his organization were a major supporter of the Romney–Ryan campaign in 2012 after organizing a debate for the Republican candidates, and a state chapter was also involved in state elections in 2011.

=== Positions ===
According to its website, the coalition opposes abortion, medical marijuana (amendment 2 in Florida), and same-sex marriage, and otherwise supports limited government. They also endorse lower taxes, the privatization of public services, free markets, a strong national defense, and Israel.

== Conferences ==
=== Faith and Freedom Conference & Strategy Briefing ===
Faith and Freedom Coalition (FFC) held its first conference in September 2010 in Washington, D.C., with prominent speakers Newt Gingrich, Karl Rove, and Bob McDonnell, the governor of Virginia. Other well-known attendees included Rep. Lynn Westmoreland, Rep. Randy Forbes, and Rep. Tom Price.

The 2011 conference was also held in Washington in June with several hundred attendees. Nearly all the Republican 2012 presidential hopefuls spoke, including Gingrich, Tim Pawlenty, Mitt Romney, Michele Bachmann, Herman Cain, Jon Huntsman Jr., Rick Santorum, and Ron Paul. The Associated Press described the conference as a "tryout for candidates hoping to fill a void left by former Gov. Mike Huckabee of Arkansas, an ordained Baptist minister who won the 2008 Iowa caucus but is not running for the 2012 Republican nomination." The Los Angeles Times said Bachmann was the most enthusiastically received by the crowd. Haley Barbour and Donald Trump, both of whom considered running but decided not to do so, also spoke. Cain was the keynote speaker at the closing banquet.

In May 2012, the organization announced a Jewish outreach component. At the June 2012 conference, a Shabbat program was held, with traditional, kosher Shabbat meals and Orthodox Jewish prayer services.

=== Road to Majority ===
On 19 June 2014, FFC marked its 5th annual Road to Majority policy conference in Washington, DC. The event was attended by national grassroots activists and featured notable speakers such as Gov. Bobby Jindal, Monica Crowley, Sen. Ted Cruz, Sen. Mitch McConnell, Majority Leader Kevin McCarthy, and Mike Huckabee. Conservative activist Phyllis Schlafly received the Winston Churchill Award for Conservative Leadership for her history of conservative activism.

On 8 June 2017, President Donald Trump gave his support to the organization and vowed to protect religious liberty and expand the role of religion in politics and education. Trump's speech was praised by Frank Pavone which he said that it inspired him in his anti-abortion campaign. However, his speech and attendance to the conference was criticised by LGBT leaders along with his lack of official recognition of the Pride Month, which started in June. Vice President Mike Pence, Counselor to the President Kellyanne Conway, Speaker of the House Paul Ryan, Senate Majority Leader Mitch McConnell, Senator Ted Cruz, James Dobson, House Majority Leader Kevin McCarthy, Steve Scalise, Pat Boone and Michael Medved also attended the conference.

The COVID-19 pandemic forced FFC to move their conference out of Washington. The conference was held at the Cobb galleria in their hometown of Atlanta Georgia in 2020, and at the Gaylord Palms Resort & Convention Center in Kissimmee Florida during 17–19 June 2021.

The conference returned to Washington DC during 23–24 June 2023 at the Washington Hilton. The conference marked the first time all eleven declared GOP presidential candidates had appeared together at an event. President Donald Trump served as the closing speaker of the conference where during the Gala dinner he received "raucous applause from a packed ballroom of evangelical Christian activists". The speech marked the one year anniversary of the Supreme Court's decision to overturn Roe v. Wade.

== Fundraising and finances ==
Faith and Freedom Coalition contracts with outside firms American Target Advertising and Unisource Direct LLC for solicitations through direct mail and telephone calls. Finances for the fiscal year ending 31 December 2022 (the latest available) consist of: revenue of $24,429,473 expenses of $26,653,399; and donations of $24,448,17.

== See also ==
- Christian right
- Christian fundamentalism
- Radical right (United States)
- Values Voter Summit
- Project Esther
