= Ralph Hudgens =

American politician

Insurance Commissioner of Georgia
- In office January 10, 2011 – January 14, 2019
- Governor: Nathan Deal
- Preceded by: John Oxendine
- Succeeded by: Jim Beck

Member of the Georgia Senate from the 47th district
- In office January 2003 – January 2011
- Preceded by: Mike Beatty
- Succeeded by: Frank Ginn

Member of the Georgia House of Representatives from the 24th district
- In office January 1997 – January 2003
- Preceded by: John Scoggins
- Succeeded by: Warren Massey

Personal details
- Born: November 21, 1942 (age 83) Miami, Florida, U.S.
- Party: Republican
- Spouse: Suzanne Hudgens
- Education: University of Florida (BS)

Ralph T. Hudgens (born November 21, 1942) was the Commissioner of Insurance of the state of Georgia from January 10, 2011, to January 14, 2019. Hudgens served in the Georgia House of Representatives as well as the Georgia Senate. He has been a delegate to numerous Republican Party events. Hudgens defeated his Democratic opponent in the 2010 election with 53.8% of the vote. He was re-elected in 2014. He announced on July 17, 2017, that he would not run for re-election in 2018. Hudgens believed insurance rates should be allowed to increase based on competition and not regulation as did former regulatory favorable Commissioner John Oxendine. During Hudgens's time in office Georgia auto insurance rates greatly increased including one year Georgia experienced the highest increase in the United States. Hudgens and his wife, Suzanne, have four children and twelve grandchildren.

== Views on Obamacare ==
With regard to Obamacare, as the Georgia Insurance Commissioner, Hudgens has opposed the implementation of Affordable Care Act and vowed to be an "obstructionist" while speaking to a group of Republicans at the Tillman Hanger Rally in Floyd County, Georgia. However, Hudgens later admitted "I spoke to a Republican group in Rome, Ga., and I said I was going to be an obstructionist, but I can’t be. I mean, I was talking to a Republican group and I was throwing them some red meat."

At the CSRA Republican Women's Club meeting, he criticized the Affordable Care Act by likening the patients with preexisting condition to a car driver that has gotten in an accident and seeks car insurance post incident. He has since retracted his remarks and stated, "I've had family members, I've had friends - who have pre-existing conditions. It's not the person's fault they have a pre-existing condition."

== Controversy ==
At a Georgia Republican public event in August 2014, Hudgens was speaking and happened to notice a journalist, Nydia Tisdale, videotaping the event, which caused him to direct a comment at her, publicly stating "I don't know why you're videotaping". This led to some apparent discomfort, in spite of her already having had approval to record the public event. Subsequently, the police arrested Tisdale, with accusations currently being leveled both at the police as well as at Tisdale. At this time, the dispute has not been settled but video has surfaced of the event.

== Electoral history ==
Georgia House of Representatives 24th District Election, 1996
Party	Candidate	Votes	%
Republican	Ralph Hudgens	6,496	50.3
Democratic	John Scoggins	6,425	49.7

Georgia House of Representatives 24th District Election, 1998
Party	Candidate	Votes	%
Republican	Ralph Hudgens (inc.)	5,606	100.0

Georgia House of Representatives 24th District Election, 2000
Party	Candidate	Votes	%
Republican	Ralph Hudgens (inc.)	6,926	52.4
Democratic	Douglas McKillip	6,291	47.6

Georgia State Senate 47th District Election, 2002
Party	Candidate	Votes	%
Republican	Ralph Hudgens	17,889	51.8
Democratic	Bob Banks	16,619	48.2

Georgia State Senate 47th District Election, 2004
Party	Candidate	Votes	%
Republican	Ralph Hudgens (inc.)	40,504	71.1
Democratic	Bill Healan	16,441	28.9

Georgia State Senate 47th District Election, 2006
Party	Candidate	Votes	%
Republican	Ralph Hudgens (inc.)	24,927	64.9
Democratic	Marc Rawson	13,501	35.1

Georgia State Senate 47th District Election, 2008
Party	Candidate	Votes	%
Republican	Ralph Hudgens (inc.)	46,257	64.8
Democratic	Tim Riley	25,172	35.2

Georgia Insurance Commissioner Republican Primary Election, 2010
Party	Candidate	Votes	%
Republican	Ralph Hudgens	117,462	20.7
Republican	Maria Sheffield	111,302	19.6
Republican	Tom Knox	91,930	16.2
Republican	Gerry Purcell	72,158	12.7
Republican	Dennis Cain	53,797	9.5
Republican	Seth Harp	48,265	8.5
Republican	Rick Collum	29,536	5.2
Republican	John Mamalakis	21,513	3.8
Republican	Stephen Northington	21,196	3.7

Georgia Insurance Commissioner Republican Primary Runoff Election, 2010
Party	Candidate	Votes	%
Republican	Ralph Hudgens	284,447	55.2
Republican	Maria Sheffield	230,453	44.8

Georgia Insurance Commissioner Election, 2010
Party	Candidate	Votes	%
Republican	Ralph Hudgens	1,368,289	53.8
Democratic	Mary Squires	1,079,716	42.4
Libertarian	Shane Bruce	96,549	3.8

Georgia Insurance Commissioner Election, 2014
Party	Candidate	Votes	%
Republican	Ralph Hudgens (inc.)	1,382,551	54.87
Democratic	Elizabeth "Liz" Johnson	1,050,883	41.70
Libertarian	Edward "Ted" Metz	86,427	3.43

Party political offices
Preceded by John Oxendine	Republican nominee for Insurance Commissioner of Georgia; 2010, 2014	Succeeded by Jim Beck
Political offices
Preceded by John Oxendine	Insurance Commissioner of Georgia; 2011–2019	Succeeded by Jim Beck
