= 2024 Georgia state elections =

2024 Georgia elections
- November 5, 2024

Several elections took place in the U.S. state of Georgia in 2024. The general election was held on November 5, 2024. A presidential primary took place on March 12, 2024, while the primary for the U.S. Houses and other offices were on the ballot on May 21, 2024. Primary runoffs took place on June 18, 2024, if no candidate reaches under 50% threshold. In addition, several general elections for judicial offices and certain consolidated city-county governments were held on May 21, 2024, concurrent with the partisan primaries for non-presidential offices.

== Federal Offices ==
=== President of the United States ===
Georgia has 16 electoral votes in the Electoral College. Joe Biden previously won the state in 2020 with 49.5% of the popular vote. In 2024, Donald Trump won the state of Georgia against Kamala Harris with 50.7%, earning Trump the 16 electoral votes.

=== United States House of Representatives ===
Georgia had 14 seats in the United States House of Representatives which were up for election. After redistricting following the 2020 United States Census, Republicans regained the 6th district from Democrats with the election of Republican Rich McCormick. A federal judge ruled Georgia's congressional maps were illegally gerrymandered and orders the state of Georgia to redraw the maps. The Georgia General Assembly convened to pass legislation to establish new congressional maps to be used in future elections until 2032 (when the new maps will be adopted to reflect changes in the 2030 United States census); Governor Brian Kemp signed the legislation.

== Public Service Commission ==
Elections were to be held for Public Service Commission districts 2, 3 and 5. Originally it was supposed to be up for election in 2022 for the first two districts, but was postponed due to a ruling in the lower courts that was overturned by the 11th Circuit Court of Appeals.

On March 6, 2024, the office of the Georgia Secretary of State announced that the election for two of five seats on the public service commission would not be held for the time being.

The elections for Districts 2 and 3 were held in November, 2025, while the election for District 5 will be held in 2026.

== General Assembly ==
All 56 seats in the Georgia State Senate and 180 seats in the Georgia House of Representatives were up for election in 2024.

=== Georgia State Senate ===
Party	Before	After	Change
Republican	33	33	Steady
Democratic	23	23	Steady
Total	56	56	

=== Georgia House of Representatives ===
Party	Before	After	Change
Republican	102	100	▼2
Democratic	78	80	▲2
Total	180	180	

== Judicial offices ==
Four seats on the Supreme Court of Georgia was held on May 21. Of the four, only the seat held by Andrew Pinson was contested, with former Democratic U.S. House member John Barrow losing to Pinson. Justices Michael Boggs, John Ellington and Nels Peterson are unopposed for re-election.

Seven seats on the Georgia Court of Appeals were up for election on May 21, with Jeffrey A Watkins, Ken Hodges, Ben Land, Stephen Dillard, Brian Rickman, and Amanda Mercier all won re-election. The remaining open seat was contested between lawyer Jeff Land and Cobb County Magistrate Judge Tabitha Ponder.

Elections for Supreme Court and Court of Appeals are at-large and non-partisan.

== District Attorneys ==
Out of the state's 49 judicial circuits, 40 of them held elections for district attorney.

== Ballot measures ==
=== Amendment 1 ===
Results by county Yes: 70–80%; 60–70%; 50–60%

"Local Option Homestead Property Tax Exemption Amendment"

To provide for a local option homestead property tax exemption and allow a county, municipality, or school system to opt out of the exemption.

Amendment 1
Choice	Votes	%
For	3,094,322	62.92
Against	1,823,529	37.08
Total	4,917,851	100.00

=== Amendment 2 ===
Results by county Yes: 60–70%; 50–60%; No: 50–60%; Tie: 50%

"Creation of Tax Court Amendment"

To create the Georgia Tax Court with statewide jurisdiction as provided by law.

Amendment 2
Choice	Votes	%
For	2,525,406	51.89
Against	2,341,612	48.11
Total	4,867,018	100.00

=== Referendum A ===
Results by county Yes: 70–80%; 60–70%; 50–60%; No: 50–60%

"Personal Property Tax Exemption Increase Measure"

To increase the personal property tax exemption from $7,500 to $20,000.

Referendum A
Choice	Votes	%
For	3,223,888	64.48
Against	1,775,768	35.52
Total	4,999,656	100.00

== See also ==
- Elections in Georgia (U.S. state)
