= Coalition of African American Pastors =

U.S. non-profit organization

- Abbreviation: CAAP
- Formation: April 1993
- Purpose: "Supporting the role of religion in American public life, protecting the lives of the unborn, and defending the sacred institution of marriage."
- Headquarters: Memphis, Tennessee
- Members: 3,000+
- President: Rev. William Owens
- Website: caapusa.org

Coalition of African American Pastors (CAAP) is an African-American civil rights and social-conservative non-profit organization. They advocate for religion in public life and against abortion and same-sex marriage.

== Activity ==
- In July 2012, the group traveled to Houston, Texas in protest of the NAACP's decision to endorse same-sex marriage. Later the same year, they spoke out in opposition to Barack Obama for his support of same-sex marriage and issued a petition against same-sex marriage which garnered over 4,000 signers.
- On June 6, 2013, they condemned the Supreme Court's decision striking down the Defense of Marriage Act.
- February 2014, the group proposed impeaching Eric Holder for his support of same-sex marriage. Later the same year they announced the formation of RISE movement.
- February 2015, the group called for Justices Elena Kagan and Ruth Bader Ginsburg to recuse themselves from a case surrounding the state-level gay marriage bans.
