= Rick Scarborough =

American evangelist minister

Rick Scarborough is a Christian political advocate and former Southern Baptist pastor from Pearland, Texas, who leads Recover America and Recover America Action.

Rick Scarborough received a B.A. from Houston Baptist University, in 1978 he received a M.Div. from Southwestern Baptist Theological Seminary, and a D.Min. from Louisiana Baptist Theological Seminary in 1996. From 1990 to June 2002, he served as the senior pastor of First Baptist Church of Pearland in Houston, Texas. In 1998, he founded Vision America. He has been involved with Focus on the Family.

In 2016, Scarborough gave the reins of Vision America to a subordinate and took a position in Washington DC as the Skyline DC Executive Director, with the assignment to lead Bible studies with governmental officials. He conducted studies with members of Congress, the State Department, and the Pentagon, as well as personally discipling members of the World Bank.

After Beto O’Rourke came within 3 percentage points of defeating Senator Ted Cruz, Scarborough moved back to Texas to mobilize pastors. That event was the catalyst for Scarborough to return to Houston and start Recover America Now!

He has traveled extensively and was viewed by some conservative leaders as the Christian right leader in 2006 and in 2008.

== Views ==
Scarborough advocates for Christian right political values. He was quoted on Christiane Amanpour's documentary series God's Warriors on CNN as saying, "I'm not a Republican, I'm not a Democrat. I'm a Christocrat. My allegiance is to Jesus Christ". He has said, "America is at war with the devil", and he supports "voting Biblically." In 2006, he criticized former Ambassador to the United Nations and U.S. Senator John Danforth for supporting embryonic stem cell research. He has publicly supported Justice Antonin Scalia.

Scarborough opposes same-sex marriage, describing it as a sign America is moving "closer to hell" and told E. W. Jackson he is willing to be burned to death opposing gay rights. After the U.S. Supreme Court effectively legalized Same-sex marriage in the United States with the Obergefell v. Hodges decision, the media reported that Scarborough had not set himself on fire. He describes AIDS as "God's judgement" and supports filing class-action lawsuits against homosexuals for "subjecting people to becoming AIDS sufferers".

Concerning the decision of Texas Governor Rick Perry to vaccinate all 6th grade girls against those HPV strains that are most likely to produce cancer after infection, Scarborough said, "Nor we can not overlook the moral dimension. The governor's action seems to signify that God's moral law regarding sex outside of marriage can be transgressed without consequence."

== Bibliography ==
- America In The Balance: American Dream VS Woke Nightmare (2023)
- Enough is Enough (1996) ISBN 0-88368-465-9
- It All Depends on What "Is" Is (1998)
- Mixing Church and State (1999)
- Judicial Tyranny (contributing author) (2005) ISBN 0-9753455-6-7
- Liberalism Kills Kids (2006)
