= John Oxendine =

American politician (born 1962)

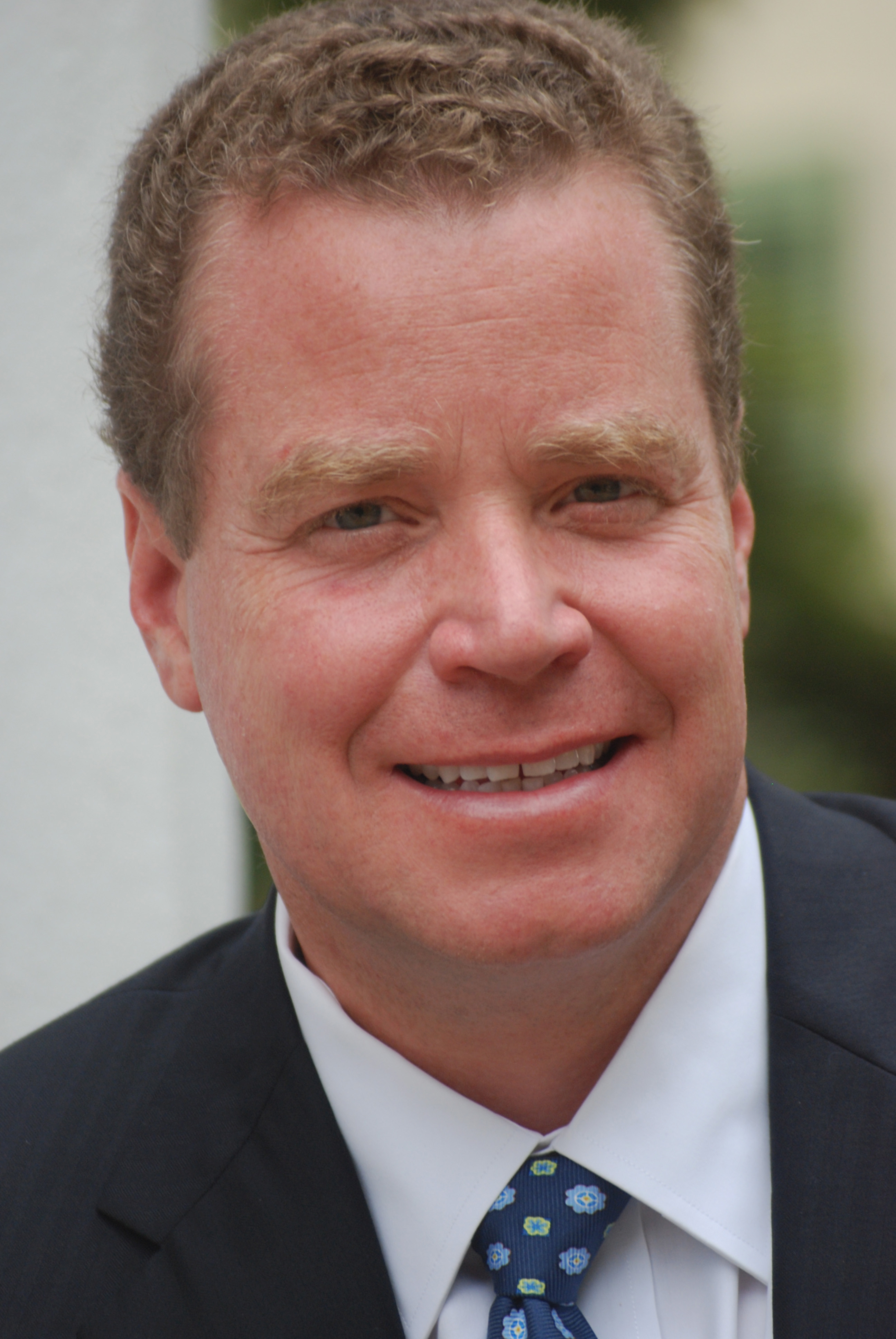
- Oxendine in 2009

Insurance Commissioner of Georgia
- In office January 8, 1995 – January 10, 2011
- Governor: Sonny Perdue; Roy Barnes; Zell Miller
- Preceded by: Tim Ryles
- Succeeded by: Ralph Hudgens

Personal details
- Born: April 30, 1962 (age 64) Nashville, Tennessee, U.S.
- Party: Democratic (before 1994); Republican (since 1994)
- Education: Mercer University (BA, JD)
- Occupation: Politician; businessman

John W. Oxendine (born April 30, 1962) is an American politician and businessman who served four terms as Insurance Commissioner of the U.S. state of Georgia. A member of the Republican Party, he was first elected commissioner in 1994 and was reelected in 1998, 2002, and 2006. Prior to entering politics, Oxendine owned and operated a small business and was a lawyer practicing in Gwinnett County, Georgia.

Oxendine began his career working on several gubernatorial campaigns and was later appointed by Governor Joe Frank Harris to the State Personnel Board.

On May 20, 2022, Oxendine was indicted by a federal grand jury on felony charges of conspiracy to commit money laundering and conspiracy to commit health care fraud. In March 2024, Oxendine pleaded guilty to charges of conspiracy to commit health care fraud, and in July 2024 he was sentenced to three and a half years in federal prison.

== Early life ==
John Oxendine is one of two sons of Jim W. Oxendine, a citizen of the Lumbee Tribe. His mother is Louise Oxendine. He has one brother, Tim from his father's first marriage. He has two sisters; Cindy Oxendine Sluder from his father's first marriage, and Shirley from his father's second marriage. John has no siblings from his father's third marriage. He grew up in Tucker, Georgia, where he was a Tucker Tiger and graduated from Tucker High School in 1980. Oxendine attributes his keen interest in politics to his father who had been a former Senior Superior Court Judge in Gwinnett County since Oxendine was in school.

He triple majored in Christianity, Greek, and political science at Mercer University, earning his Bachelor of Arts with honors in 1984. During college he worked at the Georgia State Capitol to pay for his tuition as a student assistant to Governor George Busbee. Oxendine attended Walter F. George School of Law at Mercer, where he continued being active in student organizations including the Lambda Chi Alpha fraternity, and graduated with his Juris Doctor in 1987.

Upon graduation from law school, Oxendine took over the family law practice, Oxendine and Associates, located in Gwinnett County, from his father. Oxendine and Associates concentrated in helping small businesses navigate the bureaucracy required when doing business with the federal government. Oxendine owned and ran this firm until he took the office of Insurance Commissioner in January 1995. Oxendine was called an "abomination" by a local judge who stated that "If I knew I could suspend you from practicing law in the state of Georgia for the rest of your life I would do so. You’re [an] abomination as far as I’m concerned."

Oxendine first married Lee, with whom he had one child named. Lee and John divorced on Oct 26, 1995. Oxendine later married Ivy Adams, who had also been a student at Mercer in her younger years, and together they have one child. Ivy Adams Oxendine has two children from her prior marriage. He formerly resided in Peachtree Corners, and now resides in Duluth in Gwinnett County.

== Political career ==
=== Early years ===
Oxendine began his career as a student assistant to Governor George Busbee. Oxendine later worked on the campaign staff of Joe Frank Harris, who was elected Governor and appointed Oxendine as chairman of the State Personnel Board.

=== Election as insurance commissioner ===
In the 1994 election, Oxendine opposed incumbent Democratic insurance commissioner Tim Ryles. After a long, grueling campaign, Oxendine won with 50.98% of the vote.

=== Potential U.S. Senate candidacies ===
When United States Senator Paul Coverdell died suddenly in 2000, Oxendine was inundated with calls to run for United States Senator, but decided against running. Republican leaders later settled on former U.S. Senator Mack Mattingly as their consensus Republican candidate; Mattingly was defeated by former Governor Zell Miller.

In early 2003, Miller announced he would not seek reelection to the Senate, prompting Oxendine to again consider running for the seat. On January 8, 2003, Oxendine told the Atlanta Business Chronicle, "We've had countless people across the state asking us to run for the [U.S.] Senate, and I told people I was flattered by their faith in me and that I would consider it. I did consider it to the point of commissioning a poll and the results were every encouraging. It turned out I am one of the best-known and -liked politicians in the state." However, when long time friend Congressman Johnny Isakson announced his candidacy a month later, Oxendine endorsed Isakson and restated his intention to serve out the remainder of his term as Insurance Commissioner.

=== 2006 campaign for lieutenant governor ===
In early 2004, Oxendine announced his intent to run for Lieutenant Governor of Georgia and formed an exploratory committee in 2005. He showed his fundraising prowess by raising approximately $500,000 for his campaign in just a couple months. In February 2005, after State Senator Casey Cagle and Christian political consultant Ralph Reed joined the race for Lieutenant Governor, Oxendine later announced that he would run for reelection as Insurance Commissioner.

=== 2006 reelection campaign ===
In the November election, Oxendine had his largest challenge since being sworn in, a Roy Barnes protégé and Democratic attorney Guy Drexinger. Oxendine defeated Drexinger by the largest margin in the cycle among those candidates with challengers, taking 65.6 percent of the vote to Drexinger's 34.4 percent. Oxendine carried 153 of Georgia's 159 counties.

=== As insurance commissioner ===
As insurance commissioner, John Oxendine brought reforms to the office, expanding the office hours and creating Georgia's first Telemedicine Program.

Since becoming the first Republican to control a state agency, Oxendine has consistently run the department under budget, keeping the office open eleven hours a day (8:00 a.m. --7:00 pm), and returning money to the taxpayers every year he has been in office.

Oxendine has brought the power of the private sector to bear in addressing Georgia's challenges. He created a public-private partnership to develop a comprehensive telemedicine program in the United States which expanded the availability of healthcare to every Georgia citizen without spending taxpayer dollars.

For his work on behalf of Georgia consumers and health care providers, Oxendine was awarded the American Medical Association's highest honor, the only Insurance Commissioner to receive the David Award.

Mr. Oxendine said the state has a role in making sure auto insurance premiums do not get out of control. Subsequent to his leaving office Georgia experienced increased auto insurance rates, one year the largest increase in the United States.

Oxendine has been criticized for using his emergency blue lights to bypass traffic congestion. He wrecked one agency car while using the emergency lights and siren to bypass traffic for what he claims was an emergency. Oxendine has since voluntarily given up the emergency lights, though only after being threatened that the privilege would be revoked involuntarily.

=== 2010 gubernatorial campaign ===
With Governor Sonny Perdue term-limited in 2010, Oxendine filed paperwork to run for the Republican nomination for governor. Oxendine was criticized for threatening other state politicians to stay out of the race. After being seen as the front-runner in the Republican primary race for much of the campaign, Oxendine placed fourth in the July 20, 2010 primary.

=== Campaign finance controversies ===
In May 2009, The Atlanta Journal-Constitution reported that Oxendine had received over $120,000, in campaign contributions from 10 different political action committees (PACs) in Alabama. The newspaper reported all ten PACs donated to Oxendine the maximum $12,000 contribution allowed by law; that the PACs all had similar addresses, and that the money originated from two insurance companies based in Georgia, while state law prohibits companies from giving money to the campaigns of elected officials who regulate them. Once the donations were brought to Oxendine's attention, he immediately returned the funds to their donors awaiting a legal opinion.

Subsequently, ethics complaints were made regarding donations to Oxendine's campaigns to the Georgia Government Transparency & Campaign Finance Commission (formerly known as the State Ethics Commission). After Oxendine's lawyers argued they were beyond the statute of limitations, some ethics complaints were thrown out by the commission, but on August 21, 2019, the commission began the prosecution process for ethics violations by voting to move forward with a complaint regarding the $120,000 in PACs contributions and with a complaint that Oxendine illegally used remaining $237,000 in donations to Oxendine's failed 2010 gubernatorial race for personal expenses, including spending on a down payment for a house, an athletic club membership, child care expenses, and luxury car leases. Oxendine refuted the complaints as the result of the commission staff ignoring applicable law and fabricating slanderous statements contrary to the facts.

=== Gubernatorial campaign platform ===
Second Amendment

Oxendine has publicly stated that he is "a proud Life Member of the National Rifle Association, the Georgia Sports Shooting Association, Gun Owners of America, and GeorgiaCarry.org". He says that he offers unapologetic, unqualified support of the Second Amendment.

Abortion rights

Oxendine is anti-abortion and opposes government funding of elective abortion. He supports parental consent laws for minors who seek an abortion and opposes late term abortions. He has stated that he hopes to put Planned Parenthood "out of business in Georgia" if elected governor.

Health care reform

Oxendine opposes a nationalized, government run health care system. He supports medical malpractice reforms as well as tax credits to increase access to insurance. He recently opposed the "high-risk" pool for those with pre-existing conditions in Georgia, leaving the duty of creating said pool up to the federal government, if it is created at all.

Fair tax

Oxendine has worked with fellow governors to encourage Congress to adopt The Fair Tax He has stated that "The Fair Tax is a cornerstone of my campaign; it is right for America and will help our children by once again making America the greatest manufacturing and economic capitol of the world."

Water

Oxendine has indicated that he will support efforts to utilize new water reservoirs to ensure an adequate water supply for Georgia.

Education

Oxendine supports an education model which eliminates process micromanagement at the state level; maintaining local control but ensuring accountability. Oxendine supports an "equal access voucher system" that gives parents greater choice in their children's education. He supports efforts to expand charter schooling.

== Criminal Conviction ==
On May 20, 2022, Oxendine was indicted by a Federal Grand Jury on Felony charges of Conspiracy to Commit Health Care Fraud and Conspiracy to Commit Money Laundering. Oxendine is accused in the Felony Criminal Indictment of engaging in a criminal scheme to generate over $2.5 million in fraudulent medical tests and accepting over $600,000.00 in corrupt kickbacks. Oxendine turned himself in for arrest and arraignment on the Felony charges at the Richard Russell Federal Building in Atlanta.

In March 2024, Oxendine pleaded guilty to charges of conspiracy to commit health care fraud, and in July 2024 he was sentenced to three and a half years in federal prison. He subsequently surrendered his license to practice law in Georgia in October 2024.

== Electoral history ==
Georgia Insurance Commissioner Election, 1994
Party	Candidate	Votes	%	±%
Republican	John Oxendine	754,123	50.98	
Democratic	Tim Ryles	725,134	49.02	

Georgia Insurance Commissioner Election, 1998
Party	Candidate	Votes	%	±%
Republican	John Oxendine	1,017,602	58.9	+8%
Democratic	Henrietta Canty	651,891	37.7	
Libertarian	Joshua Batchelder	59,170	3.4	

Georgia Insurance Commissioner Election, 2002
Party	Candidate	Votes	%	±%
Republican	John Oxendine	1,274,831	64.3	+5.4%
Democratic	Lois Cohen	657,754	33.2	
Libertarian	Helmut Forren	51,441	2.6	

Georgia Insurance Commissioner Election, 2006
Party	Candidate	Votes	%	±%
Republican	John Oxendine	1,357,770	65.6	+1.3%
Democratic	Guy Drexinger	713,324	34.4	

Party political offices
Preceded by Billy Lovett	Republican nominee for Insurance Commissioner of Georgia; 1994, 1998, 2002, 2006	Succeeded by Ralph Hudgens
Political offices
Preceded by Tim Ryles	Insurance Commissioner of Georgia; 1995–2011	Succeeded by Ralph Hudgens
