= James Burchett (politician) =

American politician

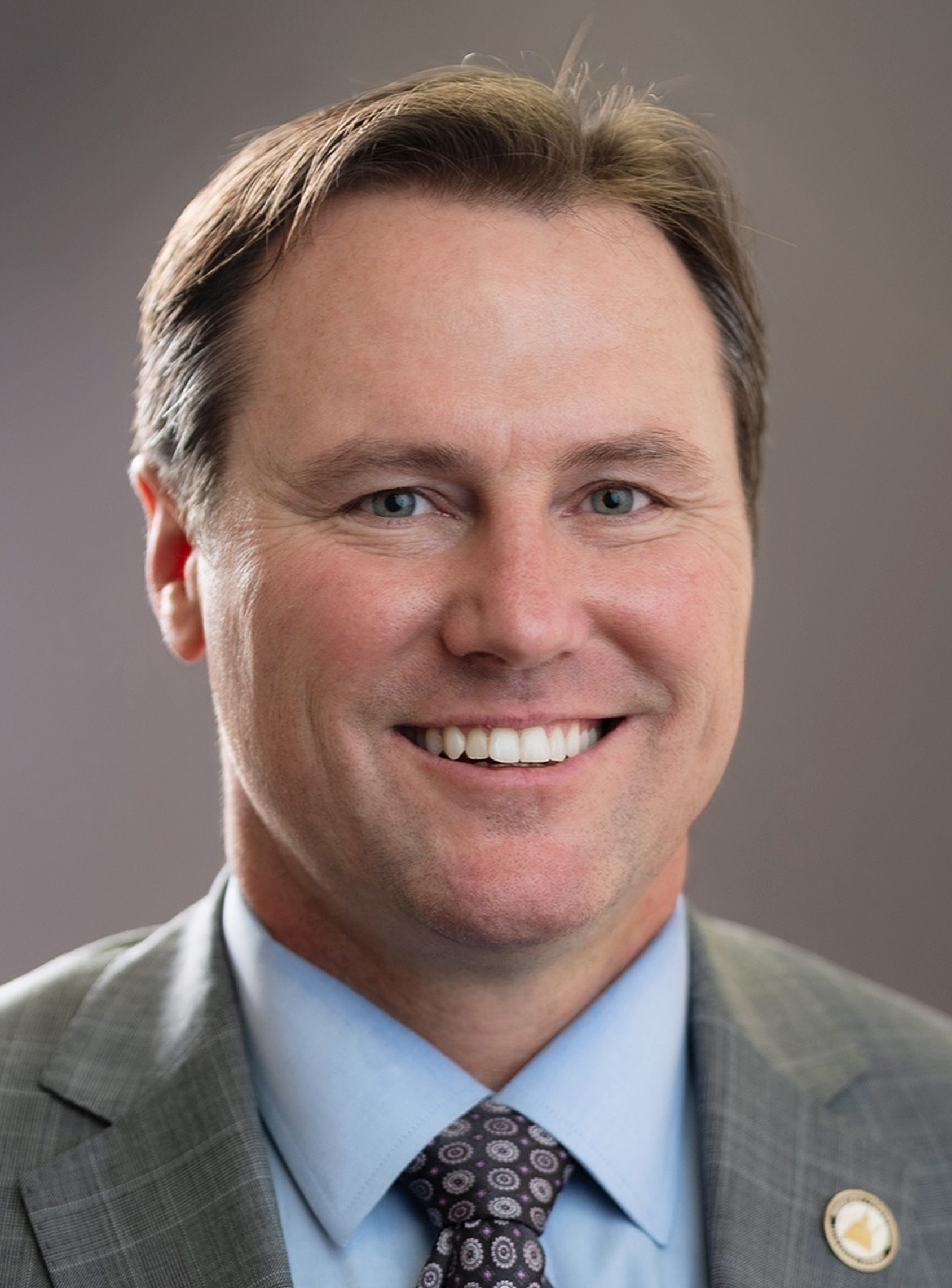
- Official headshot of James Burchett

Member of the Georgia House of Representatives from the 176th district
- Incumbent
- Assumed office March 18, 2019
- Preceded by: Jason Shaw

Personal details
- Born: James Dwayne Burchett; November 5, 1980 (age 45)
- Party: Republican
- Spouse: Misty Thrift
- Education: Georgia Southern University (BS); Florida Coastal School of Law (JD)
- Website: Campaign website

James Dwayne Burchett (born November 5, 1980) is an American politician from Georgia. Burchett is a Republican member of Georgia House of Representatives for District 176. Burchett currently serves as the House Majority Whip, and has held that position since 2023.

His district includes all of Atkinson and Lanier counties, portions of Coffee, Ware and Lowndes County, and the city of Waycross.

== Elections ==
=== 2019 special election ===
On February 12, 2019, a special election was held to fill the vacancy created by former Representative Jason Shaw's appointment to the Georgia Public Service Commission by Governor Nathan Deal. Burchett finished second in the jungle primary election, securing 42.48% of the vote. He and the first-place finisher–fellow Republican Franklin Patten–advanced to a general run-off election held on March 12, 2019, in which Burchett finished with 59.3% of the vote.

=== 2020 general election ===
In the 2020 Georgia state elections, Burchett defeated Democrat opponent Evans Primus Jr., securing his first full term as a Representative.

General election for Georgia House of Representatives District 176, 2020
Party	Candidate	Votes	%	±%
Republican	James Burchett	15,241	71.1%	N/A
Democratic	Evans Primus Jr.	6,185	28.9%	N/A
Total votes		24,126	100.0%	

=== 2022 and 2024 general elections ===
Burchett ran unopposed in the 2022 and 2024 Georgia state elections.

== Legislative positions ==
Burchett is "one of the top Republicans in the [Georgia] House" according to Greg Bluestein, the Atlanta Journal-Constitution's chief political reporter. Since 2023, he has served as the House Majority Whip, one of the leading leadership positions in the chamber.

=== Committee assignments ===
- Appropriations Committee (2021–2020; 2025–26)
- Budget and Fiscal Affairs Oversight Committee (2019–2022)
- Energy, Utilities and Telecommunications Committee
- Ethics Committee (since 2023)
- Judiciary Committee (Ex-Officio, 2021–22)
- Judiciary; Non-Civil Committee (since 2019) (chairman, 2021–22)
- Rules Committee (Ex-Officio) (since 2021)
- Rural Development Committee
- Special Committee on Access to the Civil Justice System (2019–2022)
- State Properties Committee
- Transportation Committee (since 2019)

== Political stances ==
Turning Point Action, a conservative 501(c)(4) political action group dedicated to advancing conservative policies and politicians, gave Burchett a lifetime session score of 95%, voting against Turning Point's preferred position only twice among the twenty-four votes studied.

=== Political endorsements ===
Burchett endorsed U.S. House Representative Mike Collins in the Republican primary for the 2026 United States Senate election in Georgia.

=== Education ===
==== School safety ====
On March 4, 2025, Burchett voted for H.B. 268, a bill meant to bolster student safety in schools in the wake of the 2024 Apalachee High School shooting. The bill requires schools to install panic buttons, improve records on and assessments for students with known disciplinary or mental health issues, share digital maps with law enforcement agencies, and more quickly share information once a student transfers between schools. Additionally, the law expanded state and local resources for emergency response and mental health treatment. Early versions of the bill contained provisions to create a state-wide database to track students reported for suspicious behavior, but these were dropped before the final version was signed into law.

=== LGBT issues ===
On April 2, 2025, Burchett voted for S.B. 185, a bill that prevents state prison inmates from receiving state-funded sex change procedures, cross-sex hormones, or other gender-affirming medical interventions. Democrat House members boycotted the vote.

On March 31, 2025, Burchett vote for S.B. 1, also known as the "Fair and Safe Athletic Opportunities Act." This bill requires that local school systems, public schools, and private schools with state-sponsored teams (or that participate in athletic associations with public school teams) designate sports teams as "male", "female", or "coed", and prevent males from playing on a female team, and vice versa. This sex-based designation is seen as an attempt to prevent transgender athletes from participating on the team corresponding with their gender identity. The ACLU of Georgia has called the Act "legalized discrimination" and likely to generate unnecessary litigation.

=== Public trust doctrine ===
==== House Bill 1172 ====
Following a legal settlement that gave private property owners exclusive fishing rights on the Flint River, Burchett sponsored H.B. 1172. This bill clarified that citizens have a right to pass through, hunt, and fish on all navigable streams, even if the title to the land underlying these streams was given to a private party prior to 1863, but that "entry" to privately held lands adjacent to these waterways is prohibited. Opponents say the bill's language may empower owners of land granted prior to 1863 to effectively privatize rivers and streams where touching the (privately owned) stream bed is the only way to access the (publicly owned) waterway. Burchett argues the bill "threads the needle" between public access to waterways and the rights of private landowners against trespass. Governor Brian Kemp signed H.B. 1172 into law on May 6, 2024.

== Personal life ==
While attending Georgia State University, Burchett met his wife, Misty.

Burchett manages a law firm with life-long friend James Kemp.
