= Redistricting in Georgia (U.S. state) =

Process of drawing electoral district boundaries in US state of Georgia

Redistricting in Georgia is the process by which boundaries are redrawn for federal congressional and state legislative districts. Since statehood, redistricting in Georgia has been carried out by the Georgia General Assembly. It has historically been highly controversial. Critics have accused legislators of attempting to protect themselves from competition by gerrymandering districts.

== History ==
=== 20th century ===
The decisions in Gray v. Sanders and the trio of "one person, one vote" decisions (Baker v. Carr (1962), Wesberry v. Sanders (1964) and Reynolds v. Sims (1964)) led to the redrawing of congressional and legislative districts.

The speakership of Tom Murphy was directly influential in the redistricting cycles of 1980, 1990 and 2000, in which he worked to protect the Democratic majority from growing rural and suburban gains by Republicans through gerrymandering. Murphy acted to redraw the congressional seats of high-profile Republicans Newt Gingrich (1991), and Bob Barr (2001), in what was viewed as typical of his "hardball" application of political power.

=== 21st century ===
==== 2000s ====
Democrats retained control of the redistricting process after the 2000 United States census, and Murphy led the redrawing of the maps to retain Democratic majorities. Republicans sued against the maps on Voting Rights Act grounds. Following the 2004 election, which saw Republicans gain a majority in both houses for the first time in Georgia history, redrew legislative and congressional maps in 2005 after federal judges struck down both maps which were drawn by the 146th legislature as violating the one person, one vote guarantee of the U.S. Constitution, resulting in a reshuffling of districts which took effect in the next legislature which shored up Republican gains in both chambers and in Congress.

==== 2010s ====
Georgia gained a 14th congressional district after the 2010 Census and redistricting cycle. With Republicans in control of redistricting for the first time after a census, the legislature set about to redraw the map to maximize and strengthen Republican gains in congressional and legislative maps.

==== 2020s ====
===== Congressional and legislative =====
After the 2020 Census and redistricting cycle, Republicans retained control of the redistricting process for congressional and legislative maps, and also intervened to redraw maps of several county commissions over objections from local elected officials. The 6th congressional district was redrawn to be much more Republican-friendly than in the previous decade, resulting in Democratic incumbent Lucy McBath switching to run for the redrawn 7th congressional district held by Democratic incumbent Carolyn Bourdeaux. In addition, Democrat Sanford Bishop's 2nd congressional district was redrawn to include more of Columbus-Muscogee County and extended to northern Houston County, including Warner Robins, but was also separated from much of the land bordering Florida, which went to the 8th congressional district held by Republican Austin Scott.

Litigation ensued over the racial distribution of the resulting maps. On October 26, 2023, federal district judge Steve C. Jones ruled that one district in the U.S. House in Metro Atlanta region, as well as two Georgia Senate and five Georgia House districts in the Atlanta, Macon and Warner Robins metropolitan areas violated Section 2 of the Voting Rights Act, and ordered the legislature to redraw all three maps to create new majority-minority districts. The same day, a special session was called by Governor Brian Kemp for November 28, 2023 to redraw the maps.

===== Public Service Commission =====
After the 2020 election for the Georgia Public Service Commission, in which African-American Democrat Daniel Blackman was defeated in a run-off by District 4 incumbent Lauren "Bubba" McDonald (who won the most total votes of all three Republican statewide candidates on the runoff ballot, while both David Perdue and Kelly Loeffler lost their runoffs for U.S. Senate on the same ballot), a lawsuit was filed against the PSC election method by Georgia Conservation Voters, alleging that the method violated the Voting Rights Act of 1965.

Other litigation occurred in 2022 regarding the residency requirement, with Gwinnett County resident Patty Durand having qualified for District 2 as a Democrat prior to the passage of legislation which redistricted Gwinnett County from District 2 to District 4. Following the passage of the legislation, Durand switched her residency into a county further into the newly drawn District 2. Georgia Secretary of State Brad Raffensperger moved to remove Durand from the Democratic primary ballot for 2022 for residency, but was blocked by a state judge. Durand alleged that Gwinnett County was moved out of the district in order to deny a challenge to Republican incumbent Tim Echols. Other litigation was filed after the Democratic primary for District 3, in which Chandra Farley challenged Democratic nominee Shelia Edwards' residency in District 3.

On August 5, 2022, Judge Steven D. Grimberg ruled in Rose v. Raffensperger that the requirement that candidates live in a district but be elected at-large statewide diluted Black voters' voting power and ordered Raffensperger to cancel the 2022 election until either a new election method is devised by the General Assembly or, failing that, devised by the court. The state appealed the ruling to the Eleventh Circuit Court of Appeals, which stayed Grimberg's ruling and restored the election to the ballot. On August 19, 2022, the U.S. Supreme Court issued a preliminary ruling vacating the 11th Circuit's stay of the Grimberg ruling, delaying the 2022 elections for PSC and directing the 11th Circuit to review the ruling; the Georgia Secretary of State's office did not contest the ruling, delaying the elections to an indefinite date.
