= Jason Shaw =

American politician (born 1938)

Member of the Georgia Public Service Commission from the 1st district
- Incumbent
- Assumed office January 3, 2019
- Governor: Brian Kemp; Keisha Lance Bottoms (elect)
- Preceded by: Doug Everett

Member of the Georgia House of Representatives from the 97th district
- In office 2011 – January 3, 2019
- Preceded by: Jay Shaw
- Succeeded by: James Burchett

Personal details
- Born: James Slaton Shaw Jr.
- Party: Republican
- Spouse: Katy Miller
- Education: University of Georgia (BA)

James Slaton "Jason" Shaw Jr. is an American politician from the state of Georgia. Since 2019, he has served on the Georgia Public Service Commission District 1 seat as a Republican. Previously, he served as a representative from the 176th District in the Georgia House of Representatives from 2011 to 2018.

Shaw graduated from the University of Georgia with a bachelor's degree in political science. He served in several positions in business and civic associations in his native Lanier County, including as president of the local Lions Club and Chamber of Commerce. He succeeded his father, Jay Shaw, in the state house in 2011, albeit as a Republican as opposed to his father who served as a Democrat. In the House he served as Chairman of the Appropriations Transportation Committee and the Industry and Labor Committee, as well as chairman of the bipartisan Georgia Legislative Rural Caucus.

Shaw was appointed to the Public Service Commission in 2018 by Brian Kemp to replace third-term incumbent Doug Everett, who had announced his resignation. Shaw was sworn in on January 3, 2019. He won election to a full six-year term in 2020, defeating Democrat Robert Bryant with 50.11% of the vote and avoiding a runoff.

Political offices
Preceded by Doug Everett	Member of the Georgia Public Service Commission from the 1st district 2019–present	Incumbent
