= Park Cannon =

American politician (born 1991)

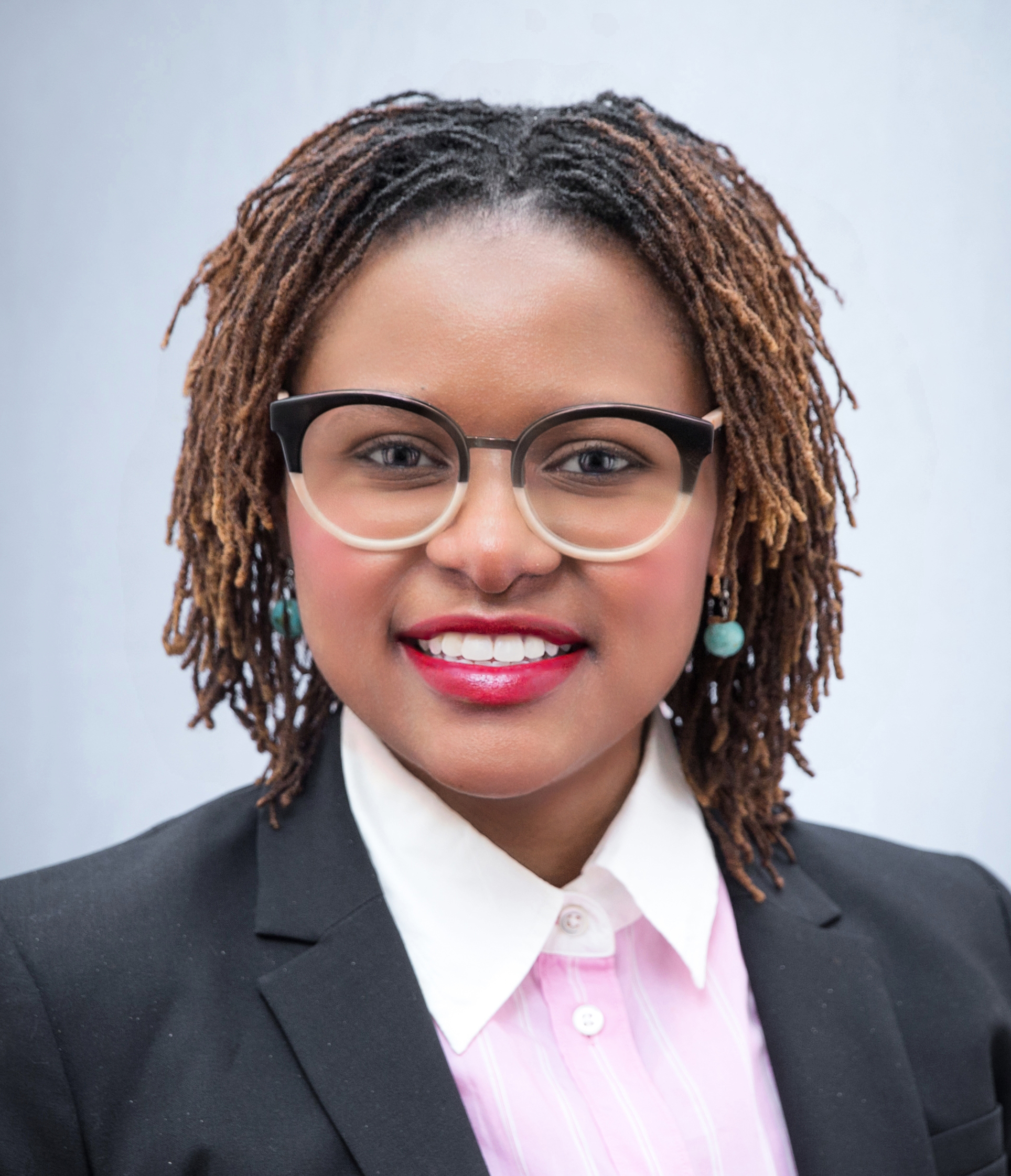
- Official portrait, 2016

Member of the Georgia House of Representatives from the 58th district
- Incumbent
- Assumed office February 22, 2016
- Preceded by: Simone Bell

Personal details
- Born: Park Elizabeth Cannon; June 6, 1991 (age 35) Albany, Georgia, U.S.
- Party: Democratic
- Education: Chapman University; University of North Carolina, Chapel Hill (BA)
- Website: Official website

Park Elizabeth Cannon (born June 6, 1991) is an American politician from the state of Georgia. She is a member of the Georgia House of Representatives, representing the 58th district, and a member of the Democratic Party.

== Early life and education ==
Cannon was born in Albany, Georgia, where her father was stationed as a noncommissioned officer in the United States Marine Corps. Her mother was a pharmaceutical representative, and after her parents divorced, Cannon's mother moved the family to Brooklyn, New York. Cannon attended Poly Prep Country Day School. At Poly Prep, Cannon was captain of the dance and step teams, ran track and cross-country, and became familiar with European languages.

After graduating from high school in 2009, Cannon enrolled at Chapman University, but encountered racism and chose to transfer to the University of North Carolina at Chapel Hill. She graduated from UNC in 2014 with a degree in Hispanic Linguistics, and a minor in women's and gender studies. As a result of her education and travels to Central and South America while she was a student, Cannon is fluent in Spanish and Portuguese.

After completing college, Cannon accepted a position with the Feminist Health Center of Atlanta. At the center, she promoted wellness for women and lobbied the state legislature for policies and programs to improve health care. In 2018, Cannon completed Harvard University's John F. Kennedy School of Government program for Senior Executives in State and Local Government as a David Bohnett LGBTQ Victory Institute Leadership Fellow. Cannon is African American and self-identifies as queer. She was named to Fast Company's Queer 50 list in 2021.

== Political career ==
When Simone Bell, who represented the 58th district in the Georgia House of Representatives, decided to resign, Bell asked Cannon to run to succeed her. Cannon ran and won the 2016 special election to the Georgia House. Cannon serves on the Code Revision, Creative Arts and Entertainment, Ethics, Human Relations and Aging, Insurance and Small Business Development committees of the House.

Following the death of Rep. John Lewis in July 2020, Cannon applied to the Democratic Party of Georgia to succeed him as the Democratic nominee for Georgia's 5th congressional district in the United States House of Representatives in the November election. Cannon was one of the party's final five candidates out of 131 applicants, but the committee chose Georgia state senator and state Democratic party chair Nikema Williams.

On March 25, 2021, as Governor Brian Kemp was signing the controversial Election Integrity Act of 2021 into law, Cannon knocked on the Governor's office doors in an attempt to discuss her concerns about the bill. She was asked twice to stop knocking on the door before being arrested by Georgia State Patrol officers who charged her with felony obstruction and "Preventing or disrupting General Assembly sessions or other meetings of members". Cannon's arrest affidavit for the felony obstruction charge stated that she was violent towards the officers while they removed her from the premises. The incident sparked backlash towards both the officers and Georgian Republican lawmakers. District Attorney Fani Willis declined to prosecute Cannon.

Cannon did not file for re-election to the House in 2026.

== See also ==
- Black women in American politics
