= Georgia's 58th House of Representatives district =

American legislative district

Georgia's 58th State House of Representatives district
Representative
Park Cannon; D–Atlanta
since February 22nd, 2016 (10 years)

Georgia's 58th House district covers parts of DeKalb and Fulton counties. Since 1972, the district is located in eastern Atlanta and includes the following neighbourhoods: East Atlanta, Cabbagetown, Reynoldstown, Edgewood, Gresham Park, Grant Park, Kirkwood, Ormewood Park and Boulevard Heights.

Prior to 1972, the district was located in Wayne County.

== List of elected representatives ==
List of representatives to the Georgia House of Representatives from the 58th district
Member	Party	Residence	Counties represented	Term start	Term end	Ref.
Carl Savage	Dem.		Wayne	1965	1969	
McKee Hargrett	Dem.		Wayne	1969	1971	
Robert Louis Harrison	Dem.	Jesup	Wayne	1971	1973	
Hugh Sledd Jordan	Dem.	Stone Mountain	DeKalb	1973	1977	
Cas Robinson	Dem.	Stone Mountain	DeKalb	1977	January 12, 1987	
Tommy Tolbert	Rep.			January 12, 1987	January 11, 1993	
Sharon Beasley-Teague	Dem.			January 11, 1993	January 13, 2003	
Barbara Mobley	Dem.			January 13, 2003	2004	
Nan Grogan Orrock	Dem.			2004	2006	
Robbin Shipp	Dem.			2006	December 22, 2009	
Simone Bell	Dem.	Atlanta		December 22, 2009	November 13, 2015	
--Vacant--				November 13, 2015	February 22, 2016	
Park Cannon	Dem.	Atlanta		February 22, 2016	Current	
