= Bill Cowsert =

American politician

- Official portrait, 2025

Majority Leader of the Georgia Senate
- In office November 17, 2014 – January 14, 2019
- Preceded by: Ronnie Chance
- Succeeded by: Mike Dugan

Member of the Georgia State Senate from the 46th district
- Incumbent
- Assumed office January 2007
- Preceded by: Brian Kemp

Personal details
- Born: William Stone Cowsert; September 1, 1958 (age 68) Jackson, Mississippi, U.S.
- Party: Republican
- Spouse: Amy Kemp
- Children: 3
- Relatives: Brian Kemp (brother-in-law)
- Education: Presbyterian College (BA); University of Georgia (JD)
- Website: State Senate website

William Stone Cowsert (born September 1, 1958) is an American politician from the state of Georgia. A member of the Republican Party, Cowsert serves in the Georgia State Senate, representing the 46th district. He is the most senior member of the Senate Republican Caucus.

== Early life and education ==
Cowsert was born September 1, 1958, in Jackson, Mississippi. He was raised in Macon, Georgia, and graduated from Macon Central High School. Cowsert subsequently earned a B.S. degree in business administration from Presbyterian College, and a J.D. degree from the University of Georgia School of Law. After passing the bar, Cowsert founded the Athens law firm of Cowsert & Avery.

== Political career ==
Cowsert was elected to the Georgia State Senate in 2006, and took office in 2007 representing the 46th District. His Senate peers elected him Majority Leader in 2014. Cowsert's senatorial district extends into Clarke, Oconee, and Walton counties. He serves on the Senate Appropriations, Finance, Health and Human Services, Judiciary, Reapportionment and Redistricting, Regulated Industries and Utilities, and Rules committees.

=== Controversy ===
Cowsert, as Vice Chair of the Senate Judiciary Committee, became embroiled in a controversial issue during the 2018 legislative session, when The Hidden Predator Act of 2018 (HB 605) was referred to his committee. The intention of HB 605 was to reopen statutes of limitations for victims of child sex abuse, and to allow civil lawsuits to be brought against both the predator and the entities who were allegedly negligent or grossly negligent in their duty of care (i.e., concealment of known predatory behavior by a person). The legislation had previously passed the House with a 170-0 vote. Cowsert, along with other Republican committee members met to draft an amended version of the bill. When the proposed legislation came before his committee, Cowsert supported the Senate version of the bill. The Senate passed the substitute version of HB 605 by a vote of 51-0, and it was sent back to the House. The bill's sponsor, Jason Spencer, asked the House to insist on the language of the original bill. This insistence came on the final day of the 2018 legislative session and past the deadline for the Senate to hold a vote on reconsideration. The Senate held a vote to waive the Senate rules on reconsideration, but the vote lost in the final hours of the session, effectively killing the bill for 2018.

Cowsert's law partner, M. Steven Heath, is currently defending Beech Haven Baptist Church of Athens in a current Georgia case of child sex abuse concealment. Cowsert has said he has no personal involvement in the case. His firm does not now, nor has it ever, represented the Boy Scouts of America, although some have incorrectly gleaned that from a vague reference in the Atlanta Journal-Constitution.

== Personal life ==
Cowsert and his wife, Amy, are the parents of three children: Will, Bob, and Caty. They are members of the First Presbyterian Church of Athens, where he is an elder. His wife is the daughter of insurance executive and state representative Bob Argo and the sister-in-law of businessman and the current Governor of Georgia Brian Kemp.

Georgia State Senate
Preceded by Ronnie Chance	Majority Leader of the Georgia Senate; 2014–2019	Succeeded by Mike Dugan
