= Simone Bell =

American politician

Member of the Georgia House of Representatives from the 58th district
- In office December 22, 2009 – November 13, 2015
- Preceded by: Robbin Shipp
- Succeeded by: Park Cannon

Personal details
- Born: Detroit, Michigan
- Party: Democratic
- Domestic partner: Valerie Acree

Simone Bell is a community organizer and former politician from Atlanta, Georgia. A Democrat, she was elected to the Georgia House of Representatives in December 2009 from the state's 58th district in DeKalb and Fulton counties, and served until November 2015.

The district lies in eastern Atlanta and includes the following neighborhoods: East Atlanta, Cabbagetown, Reynoldstown, Edgewood, Gresham Park, Grant Park, Kirkwood, Ormewood Park and Boulevard Heights.

The seat had been held by Rep. Robbin Shipp (D–Atlanta) from 2007 to 2009 but Shipp resigned in 2009 due to conflicts with her job as a Fulton County prosecutor, triggering a special election. In the election held on November 3, 2009, Bell won 24% of the vote in a five-candidate field, placing second behind attorney and fellow Democrat Asha Jackson. In the runoff, Bell defeated Jackson by 56% to 44%. She was sworn into office by Chief Justice Carol Hunstein of the Georgia Supreme Court on December 22, 2009. She ran unopposed for re-election in 2010; defeated primary opponent Ralph Long in 2012 and 2014. On October 29, 2015, Bell announced her resignation from office to join Lambda Legal as Southern Regional Director; her resignation took effect November 13, 2015. She was succeeded by Park Cannon.

Born and raised in Detroit, Michigan, Bell came to Georgia to attend Agnes Scott College in Decatur. She works in the Southern regional office of Lambda Legal, a national non-profit legal group that focuses on LGBT and HIV issues.

Openly gay, Bell is the first African-American lesbian to serve in a U.S. state legislature. Her partner is Valerie Acree.
