= Georgia's 46th Senate district =

State district in Georgia, USA

Georgia's 46th State Senate district
Senator
Bill Cowsert; R–Athens
- Demographics: 71.6% White; 18.3% Black; 4.9% Hispanic; 3.5% Asian
- Population: 184,368

District 46 of the Georgia Senate elects one member of the Georgia State Senate. It contains parts of Barrow, Clarke, Gwinnett, Oconee and Walton counties.

== State senators ==
- Paul C. Broun Sr. (1963–2001)
- Doug Haines (2001–2003)
- Brian Kemp (2003–2007)
- Bill Cowsert (since 2007)
