= 2020 Georgia Public Service Commission election =

- November 3, 2020; January 5, 2021

2 seats of the Georgia Public Service Commission
| | First party | Second party |
|---|---|---|
| Party | Republican | Democratic |
| Seats before | 5 | 0 |
| Seats after | 5 | 0 |
| Seat change | Steady | Steady |

The 2020 Georgia Public Service Commission election was held on November 3, 2020, to elect two members to the Georgia Public Service Commission, concurrently with the presidential election, as well as both a regular and special election to the U.S. Senate and elections to the United States House of Representatives and various state and local elections. While Republican incumbent appointee Jason Shaw defeated Democrat Robert Bryant for District 1, Republican incumbent Lauren "Bubba" McDonald was forced into a runoff against Democrat Daniel Blackman for District 4. The runoff was initially scheduled for December 1 but was moved by Secretary of State Brad Raffensperger to January 5, 2021, alongside the runoff elections for both Senate seats.

This was the sixth runoff election held for a Public Service Commission seat since runoffs were first mandated by law in 1964, with the first runoff being held in 1992 alongside a U.S. Senate runoff and successive PSC runoffs having been held in 1998, 2006, 2008, and 2018. The runoff was the last election held for PSC until the 2025 special election for Districts 2 and 3.

== District 1 ==
2020 Georgia Public Service Commission District 1 election
- November 3, 2020
| Candidate | Jason Shaw | Robert G. Bryant |
| Party | Republican | Democratic |
| Popular vote | 2,445,181 | 2,255,325 |
| Percentage | 50.11% | 46.22% |
- County results Shaw: 40–50% 50–60% 60–70% 70–80% 80–90% Bryant: 50–60% 60–70% 70–80% 80–90%
Commissioner before election
Jason Shaw
Republican
Elected Commissioner
Jason Shaw
Republican

Incumbent Republican Commissioner Jason Shaw was appointed by governor Nathan Deal to fill the remaining term of Doug Everett, who resigned in 2019. Shaw ran for a full six-year term and was challenged by Democrat Robert Bryant.

=== Democratic primary ===
==== Candidates ====
- Robert G. Bryant, travel agent and DEI consultant.

==== Results ====
Democratic primary results
| Party | Candidate | Votes | % |
|---|---|---|---|
| Democratic | Robert G. Bryant | 926,028 | 100% |
| Total votes | | 926,028 | 100% |

=== Republican primary ===
==== Candidates ====
- Jason Shaw, incumbent Commissioner.

==== Results ====
Republican primary results
| Party | Candidate | Votes | % |
|---|---|---|---|
| Republican | Jason Shaw (incumbent) | 942,043 | 100% |
| Total votes | | 942,043 | 100% |

=== Libertarian nominee ===
- Elizabeth Melton, writer.

=== General election ===
==== Results ====
Georgia Public Service Commission District 1 election, 2020
| Party | Candidate | Votes | % |
|---|---|---|---|
| Republican | Jason Shaw (incumbent) | 2,445,181 | 50.11% |
| Democratic | Robert G. Bryant | 2,255,325 | 46.22% |
| Libertarian | Elizabeth Melton | 179,011 | 3.67% |
| Total votes | | 4,879,517 | 100% |
| Republican hold | | | |

== District 4 ==
2020-21 Georgia Public Service Commission District 4 election
- November 3, 2020 (first round); January 5, 2021 (runoff)
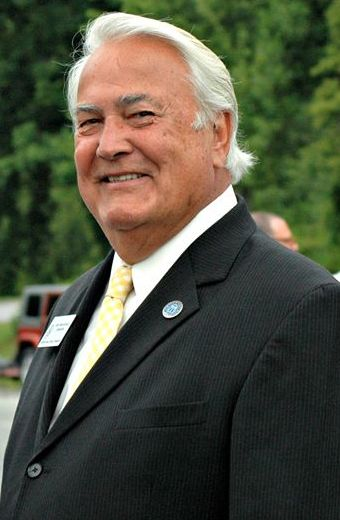

| Candidate | Bubba McDonald | Daniel Blackman |
| Party | Republican | Democratic |
| First round | 2,415,248; 49.91% | 2,272,969; 46.97% |
| Runoff | 2,234,689; 50.38% | 2,200,962; 49.62% |
- McDonald: 40–50% 50–60% 60–70% 70–80% 80–90% >90% Blackman: 50–60% 60–70% 70–80% 80–90% >90% Tie: 40–50%
Commissioner before election
Bubba McDonald
Republican
Elected Commissioner
Bubba McDonald
Republican

Incumbent Republican Commissioner Bubba McDonald ran for a fourth term in the Public Service Commission and was challenged by Democrat Daniel Blackman. Were he to win, Blackman would become only the second African-American member on the Commission in its history, with Democrat David Burgess having served from 1999 until his defeat in a 2006 runoff by Republican Chuck Eaton. Burgess was also the last Democrat to serve on the commission, with McDonald having changed his party affiliation after first being elected. Blackman and McDonald previously ran against each other for District 4 in 2014.

=== Democratic primary ===
==== Candidates ====
- Daniel Blackman, senior vice president for environmental affairs and sustainability, CFBA.
- John Noel, small business owner.

==== Results ====
Democratic primary results
| Party | Candidate | Votes | % |
|---|---|---|---|
| Democratic | Daniel Blackman | 762,740 | 71.64% |
| Democratic | John Noel | 301,948 | 28.36% |
| Total votes | | 1,064,688 | 100% |

=== Republican primary ===
==== Candidates ====
- Bubba McDonald, incumbent Commissioner.

==== Results ====
Republican primary results
| Party | Candidate | Votes | % |
|---|---|---|---|
| Republican | Bubba McDonald (incumbent) | 929,919 | 100% |
| Total votes | | 929,919 | 100% |

=== Libertarian nominee ===
- Nathan Wilson, project manager.

=== General election ===
==== First round results ====
Georgia Public Service Commission District 4 election, 2020
| Party | Candidate | Votes | % |
|---|---|---|---|
| Republican | Bubba McDonald (incumbent) | 2,415,248 | 49.91% |
| Democratic | Daniel Blackman | 2,272,969 | 46.97% |
| Libertarian | Nathan Wilson | 151,196 | 3.12% |
| Total votes | | 4,839,413 | 100% |

==== Runoff results ====
Georgia Public Service Commission District 4 runoff election, 2021
| Party | Candidate | Votes | % |
|---|---|---|---|
| Republican | Bubba McDonald (incumbent) | 2,234,689 | 50.38% |
| Democratic | Daniel Blackman | 2,200,962 | 49.62% |
| Total votes | | 4,435,651 | 100.00% |
| Republican hold | | | |

==== By congressional district ====
McDonald won eight of 14 congressional districts.

| District | McDonald | Blackman | Elected Representative |
|---|---|---|---|
| 1st | 57% | 43% | Buddy Carter |
| 2nd | 44% | 56% | Sanford Bishop |
| 3rd | 63% | 37% | Drew Ferguson |
| 4th | 19% | 81% | Hank Johnson |
| 5th | 14% | 86% | Nikema Williams |
| 6th | 49% | 51% | Lucy McBath |
| 7th | 48% | 52% | Carolyn Bourdeaux |
| 8th | 63% | 37% | Austin Scott |
| 9th | 78% | 22% | Andrew Clyde |
| 10th | 61% | 39% | Jody Hice |
| 11th | 60% | 40% | Barry Loudermilk |
| 12th | 57% | 43% | Rick W. Allen |
| 13th | 22% | 78% | David Scott |
| 14th | 74% | 26% | Marjorie Taylor Greene |

=== Allegations of improper ballots ===
Bubba McDonald, the Republican incumbent in the race, won the January 5th runoff by 33,727 votes over Democratic challenger Daniel Blackman. The down-ballot race was an anomaly, due to Commissioner McDonald receiving more total votes than any other Republican on the runoff ballot. Republican Incumbents David Perdue and Kelly Loeffler both lost their respective races to Democratic challengers Raphael Warnock and Jon Ossoff. After the runoff election, Daniel Blackman alleged the race may have been missing from some ballots, after receiving reports from voters. While "Blackman trailed Republican incumbent Lauren “Bubba” McDonald by over 33,000 votes, or 0.74 percentage points, outside the margin where he'd be entitled to a recount," the Georgia Secretary of State opened an investigation into the matter.

After the investigation, as stated in the Atlanta Journal-Constitution, "Georgia election officials say they found no evidence that the Public Service Commission race was left off some ballots, and Democrat Daniel Blackman acknowledged Wednesday that he had lost to Republican Lauren “Bubba” McDonald." Walter Jones, the spokesman for the Georgia Secretary of State's office stated, “We have learned from 2018 to now — from Stacey Abrams to Donald Trump — that false claims and disinformation that an election has been stolen is dangerous to our democracy” In the same AJC article, it was mentioned that "Blackman never alleged the PSC election was stolen, saying he wanted to make sure that every vote was counted."

== See also ==
- 2021 Georgia runoff election
