= Bubba McDonald =

American politician (born 1938)

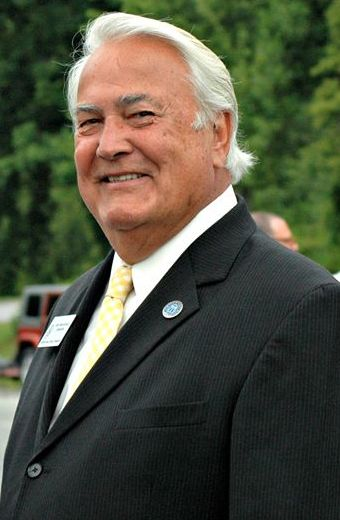

Member of the Georgia Public Service Commission from the 4th district
- Incumbent
- Assumed office January 1, 2009
- Governor: Sonny Perdue; Nathan Deal; Brian Kemp; Keisha Lance Bottoms (elect)
- Preceded by: Angela Speir
- In office June 10, 1998 – January 13, 2003
- Governor: Zell Miller; Roy Barnes
- Preceded by: Mac Barber
- Succeeded by: Angela Speir

Member of the Georgia State Senate from the ?th district
- In office 1977–1990
- Preceded by: ?

Personal details
- Born: Lauren Wylie McDonald Jr. November 24, 1938 (age 87) Commerce, Georgia, U.S.
- Party: Democratic (before 2008); Republican (2008–present)
- Education: University of Georgia (BBA); Johns Hopkins University (MA)

Lauren Wylie "Bubba" McDonald Jr. (born November 24, 1938 in Commerce, Georgia) is an American politician from the state of Georgia. Since 2008, he has served on the Georgia Public Service Commission District 4 seat as a Republican, a seat which he previously held from 1998 to 2003 as a Democrat.

McDonald attended Commerce High School. After serving in the Georgia Air National Guard from 1959 to 1964, he graduated from the University of Georgia with a BBA in 1965. Entering into politics as a Democrat, McDonald was elected as a County Commissioner (officially "Commissioner of Roads and Revenue") in Jackson County from 1969 to 1970, and then served as a state representative from 1971 to 1990. He resigned in order to run in the Democratic gubernatorial primary in 1990 but lost to lieutenant governor Zell Miller, who went on to win the general election. In June 1998, he was appointed to the PSC by Miller to succeed J. Mac Barber (who had resigned) and won a special election in November 1998 to serve Barber's remaining term. After losing his bid for re-election to a full term in 2002 to Republican candidate Angela E. Speir, McDonald ran again in 2008 as a Republican for Speir's seat and won a full term. He was re-elected in 2014 against Democratic candidate Daniel Blackman, and defeated Blackman in a January 2021 runoff by 33,727 votes. McDonald was fined for ethics violations in 2009.

Political offices
Preceded by Mac Barber	Member of the Georgia Public Service Commission from the 4th district 1998–2003	Succeeded by Angela Speir
Preceded by Angela Speir	Member of the Georgia Public Service Commission from the 4th district 2009–present	Incumbent
