= Doug Haines =

American politician

Member of the Georgia Senate from the 46th district
- In office 2001–2003
- Preceded by: Paul C. Broun Sr.
- Succeeded by: Brian Kemp

Personal details
- Born: Athens, Georgia, U.S.
- Party: Democratic
- Spouse: Lisa Lott
- Children: 2
- Education: University of Wyoming (BA); University of Georgia (JD)

Doug Haines is an American attorney and politician who served as a member of the Georgia State Senate for the 46th district from 2001 to 2003.

== Early life and education ==
A native of Laramie, Wyoming, Haines is the son of a teacher and banker. He has two siblings, including a twin sister. Haines earned a Bachelor of Arts degree in political science from the University of Wyoming and a Juris Doctor from the University of Georgia School of Law.

== Career ==
After law school, Haines worked as an attorney in Atlanta for three years before returning to Athens. In 1992, Haines established Georgia Legal Watch, a non-profit public interest law group. Haines was elected to the Georgia State Senate for District 46 in 2000, succeeded retiring incumbent Paul C. Broun Sr. He was defeated for re-election in 2002 by Brian Kemp. Haines was a candidate for Georgia's 12th congressional district in the 2004, losing in the Democratic primary.

== Personal life ==
Haines is married to Lisa Lott, a former public defender and current judge of the Georgia Superior Court. Haines and Lott have two children.

In 2004, Haines was charged with assault after an incident of road rage. Haines was later sentenced to 40 hours of community service and a mandatory anger management evaluation in 2005.
