= 2014 Georgia state elections =

2014 Georgia elections
- November 4, 2014

A general election was held in the U.S. state of Georgia on November 4, 2014. All of Georgia's executive officers were up for election as well as a United States Senate seat, all of Georgia's fourteen seats in the United States House of Representatives and all seats in both houses of the Georgia General Assembly. Primary elections were held on May 20, 2014. Primary runoffs, necessary if no candidate wins a majority of the vote, were held on July 22, 2014.

== United States Senate ==
Incumbent Republican senator Saxby Chambliss chose to retire rather than run for re-election to a third term in office.

Seven Republicans ran for their party's nomination: U.S. Representative Paul Broun, patent attorney Art Gardner, U.S. Representative Phil Gingrey, conservative political activist Derrick E. Grayson, former Secretary of State of Georgia Karen Handel, U.S. Representative Jack Kingston and Georgia Ports Authority board member David Perdue. Perdue and Kingston came first and second, respectively in the primary. As no candidate won a majority, the two proceeded to a runoff. Perdue won the runoff by a narrow margin.

Four Democrats ran for their party's nomination: former state senator Steen Miles, daughter of former U.S. Senator Sam Nunn and CEO of Points of Light Michelle Nunn, physician Branko Radulovacki and Reserve Officers' Training Corps instructor Todd Robinson. Nunn easily won the Democratic nomination with almost 75% of the vote.

2014 United States Senate election in Georgia
Party	Candidate	Votes	%
Republican	David Perdue	1,358,088	52.9
Democratic	Michelle Nunn	1,160,811	45.1
Libertarian	Amanda Swafford	48,862	1.90
Total votes		2,567,761	100.00
Republican hold			

== United States House of Representatives ==
All of Georgia's fourteen seats in the United States House of Representatives were up for election in 2014.

The race in the 12th congressional district is considered by political prognosticators to be the most competitive. In addition, open seat contests in the 1st, 10th, and 11th districts featured competitive Republican primaries for seats held by retiring Republican incumbents. There was also a competitive Democratic primary in the 4th district.

== Governor ==
Incumbent Republican Governor Nathan Deal ran for re-election to a second term as governor.

Deal was challenged in the Republican primary by State Superintendent of Schools John Barge and Dalton Mayor David Pennington. He defeated them all, winning renomination with 72% to 17% for Pennington and 11% for Barge.

State Senator Jason Carter, a grandson of former president and former governor Jimmy Carter, was unopposed for the Democratic Party's nomination.

2014 Georgia gubernatorial election
Party	Candidate	Votes	%
Republican	Nathan Deal (incumbent)	1,345,237	52.74
Democratic	Jason Carter	1,144,794	44.88
Libertarian	Andrew Hunt	60,185	2.36
Write-in		432	0.02
Total votes		2,550,648	100.00
Republican hold			

== Lieutenant governor ==
Incumbent Republican lieutenant governor Casey Cagle ran for re-election to a third term in office. He was unopposed in the Republican primary.

Connie Stokes, a former DeKalb County Commissioner, former state senator and candidate for Georgia's 4th congressional district in 2004 and 2010 was the Democratic nominee and was unopposed in her primary election.

=== General election ===
==== Polling ====
Poll source	Date(s) administered	Sample size	Margin of error	Casey Cagle (R)	Connie Stokes (D)	Undecided
Public Policy Polling	November 1–3, 2014	975	± 3.1%	52%	38%	10%
Landmark Communications	November 2, 2014	1,500	± 2.5%	54%	42%	5%
SurveyUSA	October 30 – November 2, 2014	591	± 4.1%	54%	38%	9%
Landmark Communications	October 29, 2014	1,500	± 2.5%	53%	42%	5%
SurveyUSA	October 24–27, 2014	611	± 4%	52%	41%	7%
SurveyUSA	October 17–20, 2014	606	± 4.1%	48%	40%	12%
SurveyUSA	October 10–13, 2014	563	± 4.2%	49%	42%	9%
Landmark Communications	October 7–9, 2014	1,000	± 3.1%	50%	42%	8%
SurveyUSA	October 2–6, 2014	566	± 4.2%	51%	39%	10%
Public Policy Polling	October 2–5, 2014	895	± 3.3%	48%	37%	16%
SurveyUSA	September 19–22, 2014	550	± 4.3%	47%	43%	10%
Landmark Communications	September 9–11, 2014	1,109	± 2.9%	50%	41%	9%
SurveyUSA	September 5–8, 2014	558	± 4.2%	51%	40%	9%
SurveyUSA	August 14–17, 2014	560	± 4.2%	53%	36%	12%

==== Results ====
2014 Georgia lieutenant gubernatorial election
Party	Candidate	Votes	%
Republican	Casey Cagle (incumbent)	1,466,505	58.0
Democratic	Connie Stokes	1,062,557	42.0
Total votes		2,529,062	100.00
Republican hold			

== Attorney general ==
Incumbent Republican attorney general Sam Olens ran for re-election to a second term in office. He was unopposed in the Republican primary.

Greg Hecht, a former state representative, former state senator and candidate for lieutenant governor in 2006 was unopposed for the Democratic nomination.

=== General election ===
==== Polling ====
Poll source	Date(s) administered	Sample size	Margin of error	Sam Olens (R)	Greg Hecht (D)	Undecided
Public Policy Polling	November 1–3, 2014	975	± 3.1%	51%	37%	12%
SurveyUSA	October 30 – November 2, 2014	591	± 4.1%	51%	39%	9%
SurveyUSA	October 24–27, 2014	611	± 4%	48%	43%	10%
Landmark Communications	October 20–21, 2014	1,000	± 2.75%	52%	44%	4%
SurveyUSA	October 10–13, 2014	563	± 4.2%	46%	43%	11%
Landmark Communications	October 7–9, 2014	1,000	± 3.1%	50%	44%	7%
SurveyUSA	October 2–6, 2014	566	± 4.2%	46%	39%	15%
Public Policy Polling	October 2–5, 2014	895	± 3.3%	45%	36%	19%
SurveyUSA	September 19–22, 2014	550	± 4.3%	48%	41%	12%
SurveyUSA	September 5–8, 2014	558	± 4.2%	49%	41%	10%
SurveyUSA	August 14–17, 2014	560	± 4.2%	49%	36%	15%

==== Results ====
2014 Georgia Attorney General election
Party	Candidate	Votes	%
Republican	Sam Olens (incumbent)	1,432,638	57.0
Democratic	Greg Hecht	1,081,007	43.0
Total votes		2,524,255	100.00
Republican hold			

== Secretary of State ==
2014 Georgia Secretary of State election
- November 4, 2014
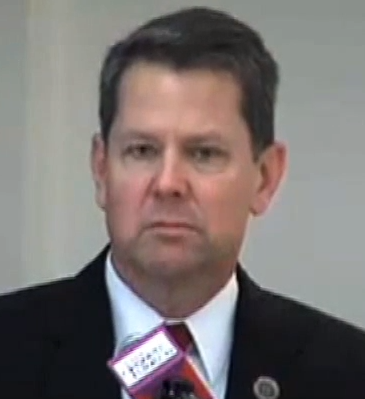

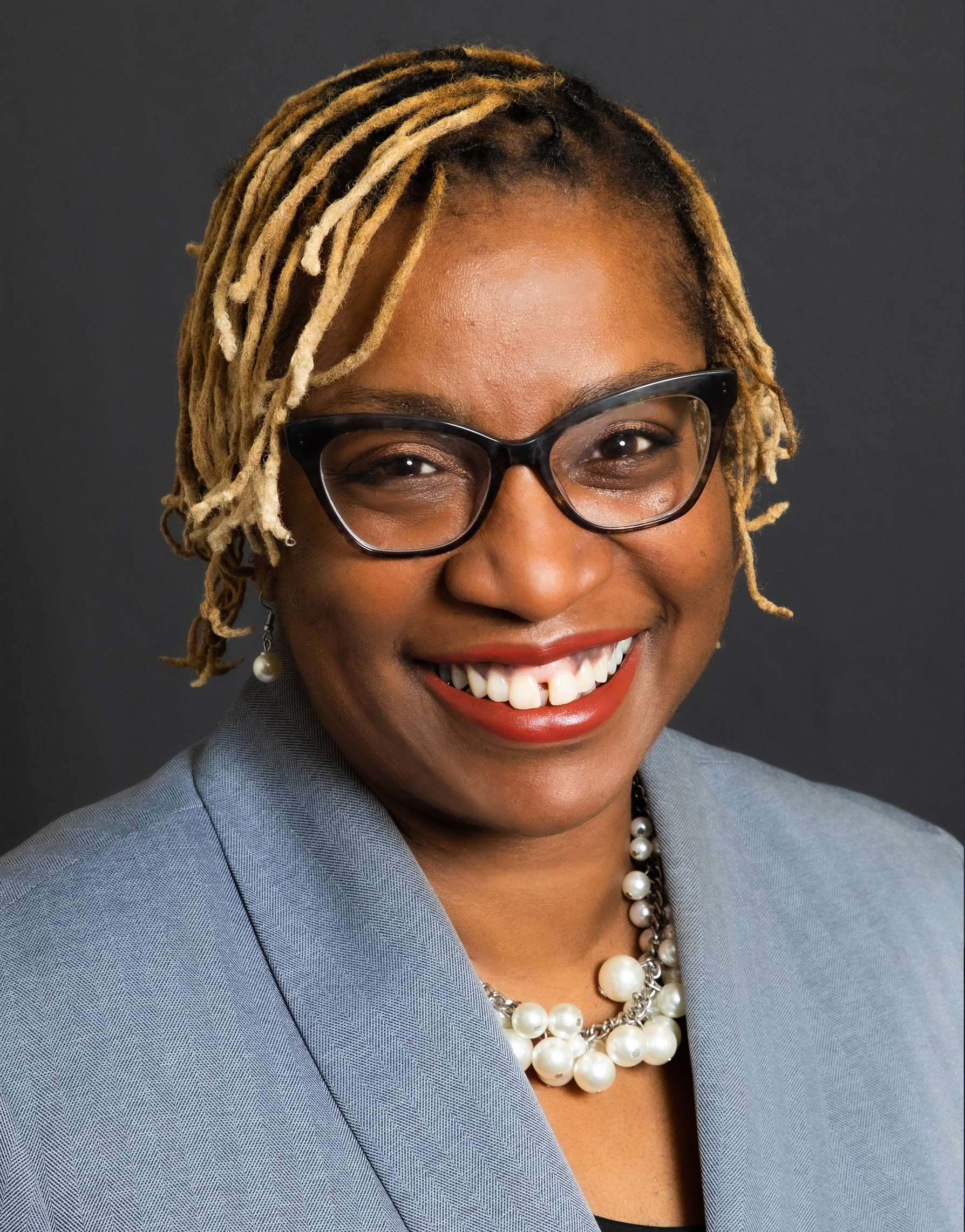
Nominee	Brian Kemp	Doreen Carter
Party	Republican	Democratic
Popular vote	1,452,554	1,075,101
Percentage	57.47%	42.53%
- County results Kemp: 50–60% 60–70% 70–80% 80–90% Carter: 50–60% 60–70% 70–80% 80–90%
Secretary of State before election
Brian Kemp
Republican
Elected Secretary of State
Brian Kemp
Republican

Incumbent Republican Secretary of State Brian Kemp ran for re-election to a second term in office. He was unopposed in the Republican primary.

=== Democratic primary ===
Gerald Beckum, the Mayor of Oglethorpe, and Doreen Carter, president of the Greater Lithonia Chamber of Commerce and a former Lithonia City Councilwoman, ran for the Democratic nomination.

==== Polling ====
Poll source	Date(s) administered	Sample size	Margin of error	Gerald Beckum	Doreen Carter	Undecided
SurveyUSA	May 8–12, 2014	549	± 4.2%	20%	48%	32%
SurveyUSA	April 24–27, 2014	435	± 4.8%	23%	48%	29%
SurveyUSA	March 16–18, 2014	443	± 4.8%	22%	45%	33%

==== Results ====
Democratic primary
Party	Candidate	Votes	%
Democratic	Doreen Carter	201,052	68.79
Democratic	Gerald Beckum	91,198	31.21
Total votes		292,250	100.00

=== General election ===
==== Polling ====
Poll source	Date(s) administered	Sample size	Margin of error	Brian Kemp (R)	Doreen Carter (D)	Undecided
Public Policy Polling	November 1–3, 2014	975	± 3.1%	50%	41%	10%
SurveyUSA	October 30 – November 2, 2014	591	± 4.1%	52%	40%	8%
Landmark Communications	October 29, 2014	1,500	± 2.5%	51%	42.8%	6.2%
SurveyUSA	October 24–27, 2014	611	± 4%	51%	40%	9%
SurveyUSA	October 17–20, 2014	606	± 4.1%	47%	40%	13%
SurveyUSA	October 10–13, 2014	563	± 4.2%	48%	41%	11%
Landmark Communications	October 7–9, 2014	1,000	± 3.1%	50%	44%	7%
SurveyUSA	October 2–6, 2014	566	± 4.2%	49%	39%	13%
Public Policy Polling	October 2–5, 2014	895	± 3.3%	48%	39%	13%
SurveyUSA	September 19–22, 2014	550	± 4.3%	46%	44%	10%
SurveyUSA	September 5–8, 2014	558	± 4.2%	52%	39%	9%
SurveyUSA	August 14–17, 2014	560	± 4.2%	53%	36%	11%

==== Results ====
2014 Georgia Secretary of State election
Party	Candidate	Votes	%
Republican	Brian Kemp (incumbent)	1,452,554	57.47
Democratic	Doreen Carter	1,075,101	42.53
Total votes		2,517,022	100.00
Republican hold			

== Commissioner of Agriculture ==
2014 Georgia Commissioner of Agriculture election
- November 4, 2014
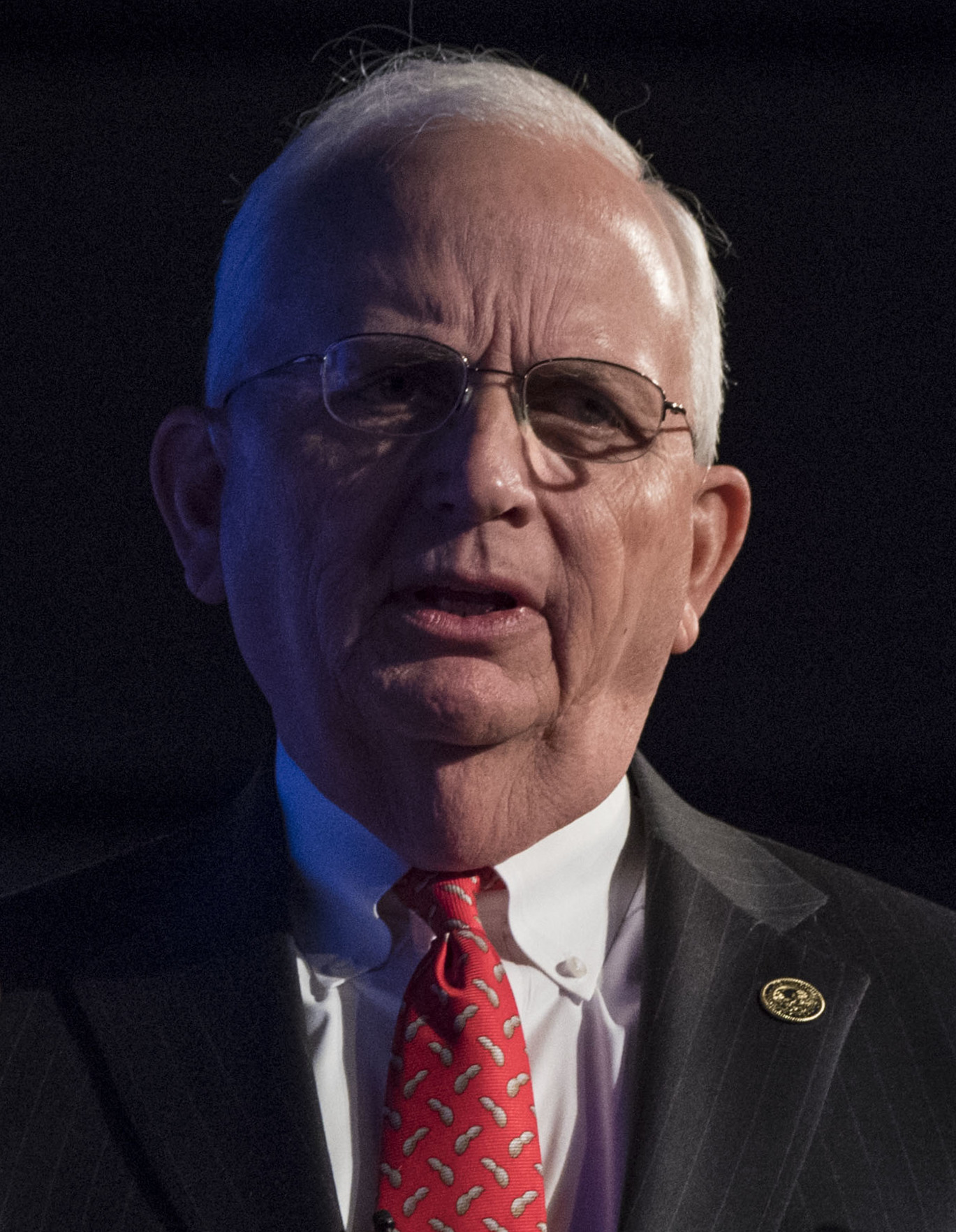

Nominee	Gary Black	Christopher Irvin
Party	Republican	Democratic
Popular vote	1,462,039	1,047,339
Percentage	58.26%	41.74%
- County results Black: 50–60% 60–70% 70–80% 80–90% Irvin: 50–60% 60–70% 70–80% 80–90%
Commissioner before election
Gary Black
Republican
Elected Commissioner
Gary Black
Republican

Incumbent Republican Commissioner of Agriculture Gary Black ran for re-election to a second term in office. He was unopposed in the Republican primary.

Christopher Irvin, a contractor, nominee for the State House of Representatives in 2010 and grandson of former Commissioner Tommy Irvin, ran unopposed for the Democratic nomination.

=== General election ===
==== Polling ====
Poll source	Date(s) administered	Sample size	Margin of error	Gary Black (R)	Christopher Irvin (D)	Undecided
Public Policy Polling	November 1–3, 2014	975	± 3.1%	47%	41%	12%
SurveyUSA	October 17–20, 2014	606	± 4.1%	49%	40%	11%
Landmark Communications	October 7–9, 2014	1,000	± 3.1%	48%	43%	9%
Public Policy Polling	October 2–5, 2014	895	± 3.3%	45%	36%	19%

==== Results ====
2014 Georgia Commissioner of Agriculture election
Party	Candidate	Votes	%
Republican	Gary Black (incumbent)	1,462,039	58.26
Democratic	Christopher Irvin	1,047,339	41.74
Total votes		2,509,378	100.00
Republican hold			

== Insurance and Safety Fire Commissioner ==
2014 Georgia Insurance and Safety Fire Commissioner election
- November 4, 2014

Nominee	Ralph Hudgens	Liz Johnson
Party	Republican	Democratic
Popular vote	1,382,551	1,050,883
Percentage	54.87%	41.70%
- County results Hudgens: 40–50% 50–60% 60–70% 70–80% 80–90% Johnson: 40–50% 50–60% 60–70% 70–80% 80–90%
Commissioner before election
Ralph Hudgens
Republican
Elected Commissioner
Ralph Hudgens
Republican

Incumbent Republican Commissioner of Insurance and Safety Fire Ralph Hudgens ran for re-election to a second term in office. He was unopposed in the Republican primary.

Ted Metz qualified as the Libertarian nominee.

=== Democratic primary ===
Insurance associate and former state representative Keith Heard and retired insurance professional Liz Johnson ran for the Democratic nomination.

==== Polling ====
Poll source	Date(s) administered	Sample size	Margin of error	Keith Heard	Liz Johnson	Undecided
SurveyUSA	May 8–12, 2014	549	± 4.2%	26%	43%	31%
SurveyUSA	April 24–27, 2014	435	± 4.8%	28%	48%	25%
SurveyUSA	March 16–18, 2014	443	± 4.8%	29%	45%	26%

==== Results ====
Democratic primary
Party	Candidate	Votes	%
Democratic	Liz Johnson	203,318	69.93
Democratic	Keith Heard	87,437	30.07
Total votes		290,755	100

=== General election ===
==== Polling ====
Poll source	Date(s) administered	Sample size	Margin of error	Ralph Hudgens (R)	Liz Johnson (D)	Ted Metz (L)	Undecided
Public Policy Polling	November 1–3, 2014	975	± 3.1%	46%	37%	6%	11%
Landmark Communications	October 20–21, 2014	1,000	± 2.75%	46%	41%	9%	4%
GaPundit.com	October 13–14, 2014	1,543	± 2.49%	46%	37%	9%	8%
Public Policy Polling	October 2–5, 2014	895	± 3.3%	41%	34%	10%	15%

==== Results ====
2014 Georgia Insurance and Fire Safety Commissioner election
Party	Candidate	Votes	%
Republican	Ralph Hudgens (incumbent)	1,382,551	54.87
Democratic	Liz Johnson	1,050,883	41.70
Libertarian	Ted Metz	86,427	3.43
Total votes		2,519,861	100.00
Republican hold			

== Commissioner of Labor ==
2014 Georgia Commissioner of Labor election
- November 4, 2014

Nominee	Mark Butler	Robbin Shipp
Party	Republican	Democratic
Popular vote	1,427,662	1,079,898
Percentage	56.93%	43.07%
- County results Butler: 50–60% 60–70% 70–80% 80–90% Shipp: 50–60% 60–70% 70–80% 80–90%
Commissioner before election
Mark Butler
Republican
Elected Commissioner
Mark Butler
Republican

Incumbent Republican Commissioner of Labor Mark Butler ran for re-election to a second term in office. He was unopposed in the Republican primary.

Attorney and former state representative Robbin Shipp is the Democratic nominee. She was unopposed in the primary election.

=== General election ===
==== Polling ====
Poll source	Date(s) administered	Sample size	Margin of error	Mark Butler (R)	Robbin Shipp (D)	Undecided
Public Policy Polling	November 1–3, 2014	975	± 3.1%	47%	39%	14%
Public Policy Polling	October 2–5, 2014	895	± 3.3%	45%	36%	19%

==== Results ====
2014 Georgia Labor Commissioner election
Party	Candidate	Votes	%
Republican	Mark Butler (incumbent)	1,427,662	56.93
Democratic	Robbin Shipp	1,079,898	43.07
Total votes		2,507,560	100.00
Republican hold			

== State Superintendent of Schools ==
2014 Georgia State Superintendent of Schools election
- November 4, 2014
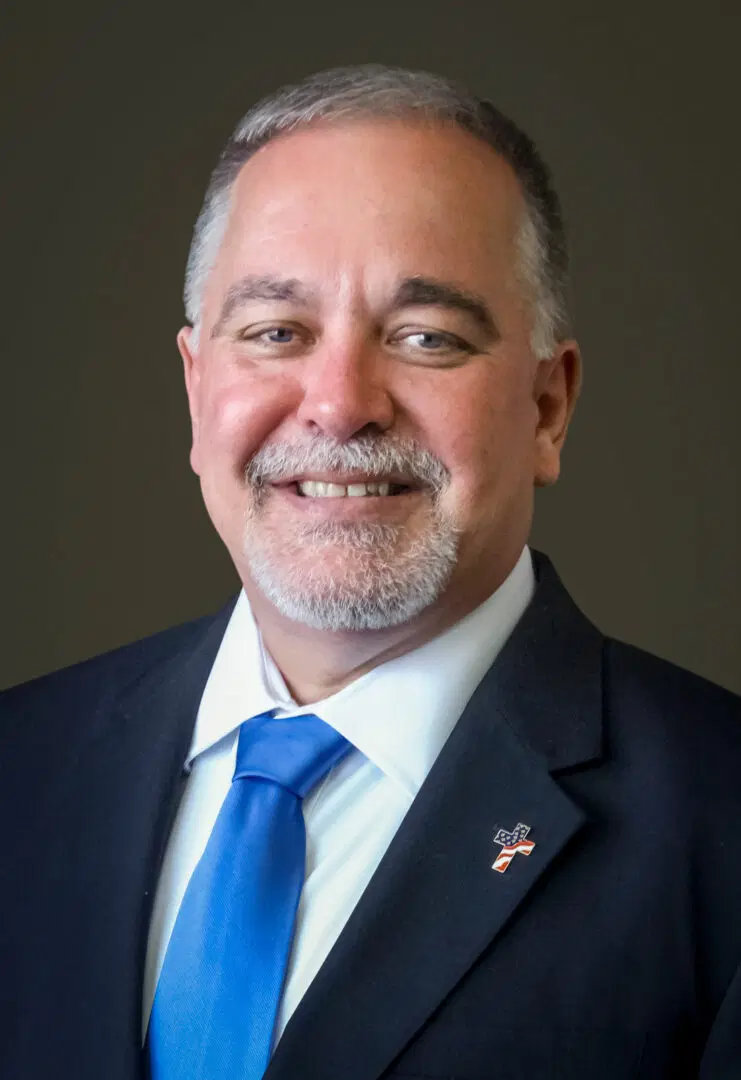

Nominee	Richard Woods	Valarie Wilson
Party	Republican	Democratic
Popular vote	1,391,005	1,132,886
Percentage	55.11%	44.89%
- County results Woods: 50–60% 60–70% 70–80% 80–90% Wilson: 50–60% 60–70% 70–80% 80–90%
Superintendent before election
John Barge
Republican
Elected Superintendent
Richard Woods
Republican

Incumbent Republican State Superintendent of Schools John Barge did not run for re-election to a second term in office. He instead ran for governor.

=== Republican primary ===
==== Candidates ====
===== Declared =====
- Mary Kay Bacallao, Fayette County Board of Education member
- Ashley D. Bell, former Hall County Commissioner
- Mike Buck, Chief of Staff to John Barge and former administrator of the Rome City School District
- Sharyl Dawes, teacher and former chairman of the Gwinnett County Republican
- Allen Bowles Fort, superintendent of the Quitman County School District
- Nancy Jester, actuarial accountant and former DeKalb County School Board member
- Fitz Johnson, businessman
- Kira Willis, teacher and Libertarian nominee for superintendent in 2010
- Richard Woods, Republican candidate for superintendent in 2010

===== Withdrew =====
- Matt Schultz, Bartow County School Board member (endorsed Johnson)

===== Declined =====
- John Barge, incumbent State Superintendent of Schools (ran for Governor)

==== Polling ====
Poll source	Date(s) administered	Sample size	Margin of error	Mary Kay Bacallo	Ashley Bell	Mike Buck	Sharyl Dawes	Allen Fort	Nancy Jester	Fitz Johnson	Kira Willis	Richard Woods	Undecided
SurveyUSA	May 8–12, 2014	634	± 4%	5%	13%	9%	5%	7%	5%	5%	5%	8%	38%
SurveyUSA	April 24–27, 2014	501	± 4.5%	4%	10%	7%	4%	7%	7%	5%	3%	9%	43%
SurveyUSA	March 16–18, 2014	508	± 4.2%	2%	10%	8%	3%	8%	7%	5%	3%	9%	45%

==== Results ====
Republican primary
Party	Candidate	Votes	%
Republican	Mike Buck	91,435	19.52
Republican	Richard Woods	78,542	16.77
Republican	Mary Kay Bacallo	71,810	15.33
Republican	Ashley Bell	70,065	14.96
Republican	Nancy Jester	51,211	10.93
Republican	Fitz Johnson	35,862	7.65
Republican	Allen Fort	29,504	6.30
Republican	Sharyl Dawes	25,468	5.44
Republican	Kira Willis	14,584	3.11
Total votes		468,481	100.00

==== Runoff ====
Runoff results (recount) by county Woods: 50–60%; 60–70%; 70–80%; >90%; Buck: 50–60%; 60–70%; 70–80%

Buck and Woods advanced to the runoff, which Woods won by 199,453 votes to 198,740. As his 713-vote margin of victory was less than 1%, a recount was considered likely. Buck duly requested one on July 29 and two days later, Woods was confirmed as the winner after Buck only narrowed the margin by 13 votes.

Republican primary runoff initial results
Party	Candidate	Votes	%
Republican	Richard Woods	199,453	50.09
Republican	Mike Buck	198,740	49.91
Total votes		398,193	100.00

Republican primary runoff results after recount
Party	Candidate	Votes	%
Republican	Richard Woods	199,439	50.09
Republican	Mike Buck	198,739	49.91
Total votes		398,178	100.00

=== Democratic primary ===
==== Candidates ====
===== Declared =====
- Tarnisha Dent, teacher
- Denise Freeman, consultant and advocate
- Jurita Forehand Mays, teacher
- Alisha Thomas Morgan, state representative and non-profit director
- Rita Robinzine, teacher and candidate for the State House of Representatives in 2008
- Valarie Wilson, former president of the Georgia School Boards Association and former City Schools of Decatur Board member

==== Polling ====
Poll source	Date(s) administered	Sample size	Margin of error	Tarnisha Dent	Denise Freeman	Jurita Forehand Mays	Alisha Thomas Morgan	Rita Robinzine	Valarie Wilson	Undecided
SurveyUSA	May 8–12, 2014	549	± 4.2%	10%	13%	6%	20%	3%	17%	30%
SurveyUSA	April 24–27, 2014	435	± 4.8%	10%	13%	5%	19%	5%	16%	30%
SurveyUSA	March 16–18, 2014	443	± 4.8%	9%	16%	11%	12%	5%	17%	29%

==== Results ====
Democratic primary
Party	Candidate	Votes	%
Democratic	Valarie Wilson	96,849	32.59
Democratic	Alisha Thomas Morgan	78,460	26.40
Democratic	Denise Freeman	54,428	18.32
Democratic	Tarnisha Dent	40,007	13.46
Democratic	Jurita Forehand Mays	16,818	5.66
Democratic	Rita Robinzine	10,609	3.57
Total votes		297,171	100.00

==== Runoff ====
Wilson and Morgan advanced to a runoff, which Wilson won.

Democratic primary runoff
Party	Candidate	Votes	%
Democratic	Valarie Wilson	73,740	54.37
Democratic	Alisha Thomas Morgan	61,882	45.63
Total votes		135,622	100.00

=== General election ===
==== Polling ====
Poll source	Date(s) administered	Sample size	Margin of error	Richard Woods (R)	Valarie Wilson (D)	Undecided
Public Policy Polling	November 1–3, 2014	975	± 3.1%	47%	40%	13%
SurveyUSA	October 30 – November 2, 2014	591	± 4.1%	47%	44%	8%
Landmark Communications	October 29, 2014	1,500	± 2.5%	47%	46%	6%
SurveyUSA	October 24–27, 2014	611	± 4%	48%	43%	9%
Landmark Communications	October 20–21, 2014	1,000	± 2.75%	50%	46%	5%
SurveyUSA	October 17–20, 2014	606	± 4.1%	46%	44%	11%
GaPundit.com	October 13–14, 2014	1,543	± 2.49%	47%	43%	10%
SurveyUSA	October 10–13, 2014	563	± 4.2%	46%	46%	8%
SurveyUSA	October 2–6, 2014	566	± 4.2%	46%	42%	12%
Public Policy Polling	October 2–5, 2014	895	± 3.3%	46%	40%	14%
SurveyUSA	September 19–22, 2014	550	± 4.3%	46%	44%	10%
SurveyUSA	September 5–8, 2014	558	± 4.2%	47%	43%	10%
GaPundit.com	August 24–25, 2014	1,578	± 2.47%	47%	43%	10%
SurveyUSA	August 14–17, 2014	560	± 4.2%	51%	39%	10%

==== Results ====
2014 Georgia Schools Superintendent election
Party	Candidate	Votes	%
Republican	Richard Woods	1,391,005	55.11
Democratic	Valarie Wilson	1,132,886	44.89
Total votes		2,523,891	100.00
Republican hold			

== Public Service Commission ==
Two members of the five-person Georgia Public Service Commission were up for election.

=== District 1 ===
2014 Georgia Public Service Commission District 1 election
- November 4, 2014

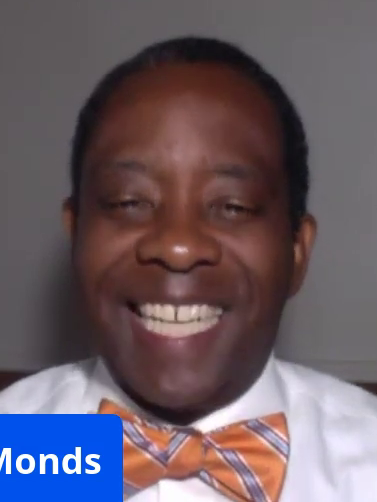
Candidate	H. Doug Everett	John Monds
Party	Republican	Libertarian
Popular vote	1,532,652	710,408
Percentage	68.33%	31.67%
- County results Everett: 50–60% 60–70% 70–80% 80–90% >90% Monds: 50–60% 60–70%
Commissioner before election
H. Doug Everett
Republican
Elected Commissioner
H. Doug Everett
Republican

District 1 incumbent Republican Herman D. "Doug" Everett ran for re-election.

Libertarian John Monds, the nominee for the seat in 2008 and the nominee for Governor in 2010 qualified as the Libertarian nominee to oppose Everett, while no Democrat filed to run.

==== General election ====
===== Polling =====
Poll source	Date(s) administered	Sample size	Margin of error	Doug Everett (R)	John Monds (L)	Undecided
GaPundit.com	October 13–14, 2014	1,543	± 2.49%	45%	31%	24%

===== Results =====
2014 Georgia Public Service Commission District 1 election
Party	Candidate	Votes	%
Republican	H. Doug Everett (incumbent)	1,532,652	68.33
Libertarian	John Monds	710,408	31.67
Total votes		2,243,060	100.00
Republican hold			

=== District 4 ===
2014 Georgia Public Service Commission District 4 election
- November 4, 2014
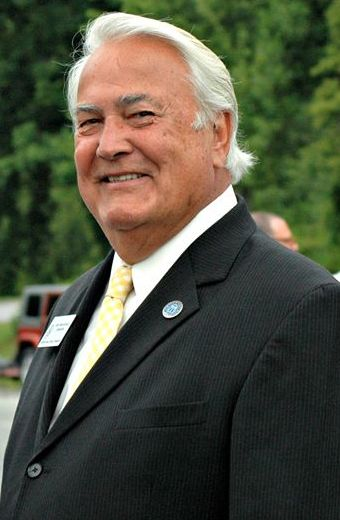

Candidate	Bubba McDonald	Daniel Blackman
Party	Republican	Democratic
Popular vote	1,341,182	1,048,917
Percentage	53.38%	41.75%
- County results McDonald: 40–50% 50–60% 60–70% 70–80% 80–90% Blackman: 40–50% 50–60% 60–70% 70–80% 80–90%
Commissioner before election
Bubba McDonald
Republican
Elected Commissioner
Bubba McDonald
Republican

Incumbent Republican Bubba McDonald ran for re-election to a second consecutive and third overall term in office.

Business manager and candidate for the State House of Representatives in 2008 Daniel Blackman was unopposed for the Democratic nomination.

Aaron Gilmer was the Libertarian nominee.

==== Republican primary ====
- Bubba McDonald, incumbent Commissioner.
- Doug Kidd, attorney.
- Craig Lutz, insurance agent and Hall County Commissioner.

===== Results =====
Republican primary results
Party	Candidate	Votes	%
Republican	Bubba McDonald (incumbent)	318,930	62.28
Republican	Doug Kidd	106,738	20.84
Republican	Craig Lutz	86,429	16.88
Total votes		512,097	100.00

==== General election ====
===== Polling =====
Poll source	Date(s) administered	Sample size	Margin of error	Bubba McDonald (R)	Daniel Blackman (D)	Aaron Gilmer (L)	Undecided
GaPundit.com	October 13–14, 2014	1,543	± 2.49%	43%	37%	11%	9%

===== Results =====
2014 Georgia Public Service Commission District 4 election
Party	Candidate	Votes	%
Republican	Bubba McDonald (incumbent)	1,341,182	53.38
Democratic	Daniel Blackman	1,048,917	41.75
Libertarian	Robin A. Gilmer	122,326	4.87
Total votes		2,512,425	100.00
Republican hold			

== Judicial Elections ==
Three seats on the Georgia Supreme Court and five seats on the Georgia Court of Appeals were up for statewide elections. Supreme Court justices Robert Benham, Keith Blackwell and Harris Hines and Court of Appeals judges Gary Andrews, Elizabeth Branch, Sara Doyle, Carla McMillian and Billy Ray II all won their respective races uncontested.

== Georgia General Assembly ==
All 56 seats in the Georgia State Senate and 180 seats in the Georgia House of Representatives were up for election.

=== Georgia State Senate ===
Party	Before	After	Change
Republican	38	38	Steady
Democratic	18	18	Steady
Total	56	56	

=== Georgia House of Representatives ===
Party	Before	After	Change
Republican	118	120	▲2
Democratic	60	59	▼1
Independent	1	1	Steady
Vacant	1	0	▼1
Total	180	180	

== Ballot Measures ==
=== Amendment 1 ===
Results by county Yes: 80–90%; 70–80%; 60–70%; 50–60%

Prohibits the state from increasing the maximum state income tax rate above that in effect on January 1, 2015.

Amendment 1
Choice	Votes	%
For	1,855,380	73.88
Against	655,917	26.12
Total	2,511,297	100.00

=== Amendment 2 ===
Results by county Yes: 70–80%; 60–70%; 50–60%

Empowers the legislature to impose additional reckless driving penalties and allocate revenue from such penalties to the Brain and Spinal Injury Trust Fund.

Amendment 2
Choice	Votes	%
For	1,735,432	69.84
Against	749,490	30.16
Total	2,484,922	100.00

=== Referendum A ===
Results by county Yes: 80–90%; 70–80%; 60–70%; 50–60%; No: 50–60%

Extends an ad valorem tax exemption to privately owned and operated student dormitories and parking decks within the University of Georgia system.

Referendum A
Choice	Votes	%
For	1,839,537	73.67
Against	657,367	26.33
Total	2,496,904	100.00
