= Paul C. Broun Sr. =

American politician

Paul Broun

Member of the Georgia State Senate from the 46th district
- In office 1963–2001
- Succeeded by: Doug Haines

Personal details
- Born: Paul Collins Broun; March 1, 1916 Shellman, Georgia, U.S.
- Died: February 14, 2005 (aged 89) Athens, Georgia, U.S.
- Party: Democratic
- Children: 3, including Paul Jr.
- Education: University of Georgia (BS)

Military service
- Branch/service: United States Army
- Battles/wars: World War II

Paul Collins Broun Sr. (March 1, 1916 – February 14, 2005) was an American politician and businessman who served as a member of the Georgia State Senate for the 46th district from 1963 to 2001. He was a member of the Democratic Party.

== Early life and education ==
Broun was born in Shellman, Georgia. In 1930, Broun moved with his family to Athens, Georgia. Broun graduated from Athens High School in 1933. He received his bachelor's degree in agricultural engineering from University of Georgia in 1937. During World War II, Broun served in the United States Army and was commissioned a lieutenant colonel.

== Career ==
Broun owned a car dealership and tire business in Athens, Georgia. Broun served in the Georgia Senate from 1963 to 2001 as a Democrat.

== Personal life ==
Broun died in Athens, Georgia. His son, Paul Broun, served in the United States House of Representatives.
