= 2021 Georgia runoff election =

Following the 2020 United States elections, both U.S. Senate seats in the state of Georgia went to runoffs concurrently held on January 5, 2021. As Democratic Party challengers defeated both Republican Party incumbents, Democrats took control of the U.S. Senate, giving a government trifecta to the newly elected U.S. president Joe Biden.

Democrats won both senate races, Ossoff 50.6% to 49.4%, Warnock 51.0% to 49.0%. However, the Republican candidate won the Public Service Commission election by 50.4% to 49.6%.

== United States Senate ==
The individual 2021 Georgia runoff elections were:

- 2020–21 United States Senate election in Georgia, a general election for a full six-year term in which Democrat Jon Ossoff defeated Republican incumbent David Perdue
- 2020–21 United States Senate special election in Georgia, a special election to finish Johnny Isakson's term in which Democrat Raphael Warnock defeated Republican incumbent Kelly Loeffler

== Other offices ==
- 2020 Georgia Public Service Commission election
