= Georgia's 176th House of Representatives district =

State district in Georgia, USA

Georgia's 176th State House of Representatives district
Representative
James Burchett; R–Waycross
- Demographics: 64.9% White; 24.7% Black; 7.3% Hispanic; 0.6% Asian
- Population: 55,491

District 176 elects one member of the Georgia House of Representatives. It contains the entirety of Atkinson County and Lanier County, as well as parts of Coffee County, Lowndes County and Ware County.

== Members ==
- Jason Shaw (2011–2018)
- James Burchett (since 2019)
