= Robbin Shipp =

American attorney and politician

Member of the Georgia House of Representatives from the 58th district
- In office 2006–2009

Personal details
- Born: February 1, 1963 (age 63) Oklahoma City, Oklahoma, U.S.
- Party: Democratic
- Education: Shaw University (BA); Georgia College & State University (MPA); Mercer University (JD)
- Occupation: Lawyer

Robbin Shipp is an American attorney and former member of the Georgia House of Representatives. She was the Democratic nominee for state Commissioner of Labor in the 2014 election.

She is a graduate of Shaw University (BA, Communications), Georgia College & State University (MPA, Political Science) and the Walter F. George School of Law at Mercer University (Juris Doctor).

Shipp has worked as an Assistant District Attorney in Fulton County, Georgia, and as Associate General Counsel for the Grady Health System.

She is the co-author of Justice While Black: Helping African American Families Navigate and Survive the Criminal Justice System, which was nominated for a 2015 NAACP Image Award for Excellence in Writing – Instructional.

Party political offices
Preceded by Darryl Hicks	Democratic nominee for Labor Commissioner of Georgia; 2014	Succeeded by Richard Keatley
