= Brian Kemp =

Governor of Georgia since 2019

- Official portrait, 2024

83rd Governor of Georgia
- Incumbent
- Assumed office January 14, 2019
- Lieutenant: Geoff Duncan; Burt Jones
- Preceded by: Nathan Deal

Chair of the Republican Governors Association
- In office November 20, 2024 – November 18, 2025
- Preceded by: Bill Lee
- Succeeded by: Greg Gianforte

27th Secretary of State of Georgia
- In office January 8, 2010 – November 8, 2018
- Governor: Sonny Perdue; Nathan Deal
- Preceded by: Karen Handel
- Succeeded by: Robyn Crittenden

Member of the Georgia State Senate from the 46th district
- In office January 3, 2003 – January 3, 2007
- Preceded by: Doug Haines
- Succeeded by: Bill Cowsert

Personal details
- Born: Brian Porter Kemp; November 2, 1963 (age 63) Athens, Georgia, U.S.
- Party: Republican
- Spouse: Marty Argo (m. 1994)
- Children: 3
- Relatives: Bill Cowsert (brother-in-law); Bob Argo (father-in-law)
- Education: University of Georgia (BS)
- Website: Office website Campaign website
- Kemp's voice Kemp on redistricting in Georgia. Recorded February 23, 2018

Brian Porter Kemp (born November 2, 1963) is an American politician and businessman serving as the 83rd governor of Georgia since 2019. A member of the Republican Party, Kemp served as the state's 27th secretary of state from 2010 to 2018, and as a member of the Georgia State Senate from 2003 to 2007. He is the first Republican since Reconstruction to be elected governor of Georgia who was not a former Democrat.

Kemp is a graduate of the University of Georgia. Before entering politics, he operated several businesses in agriculture, financial services, and real estate. In 2002, he was elected to the Georgia State Senate. Kemp ran for commissioner of the Georgia Department of Agriculture in 2006 but lost the Republican primary. In 2010, Governor Sonny Perdue appointed Kemp secretary of state. He was elected to a full term as secretary in 2010 and reelected in 2014. In 2015, Kemp was criticized after a data breach of over six million voters' personal information to 12 organizations. During the 2016 election, he was the only state official to reject help from the Department of Homeland Security to guard against Russian interference.

Kemp ran for governor in 2018 and faced Democratic nominee Stacey Abrams. He refused to resign as secretary of state while campaigning for governor, which stirred controversy and accusations of abuse of power from Democrats. Kemp narrowly won the general election and resigned as secretary of state shortly thereafter. Abrams refused to concede and accused Kemp of voter suppression and of stealing the election from her, which he denied. News outlets and political science experts have found no evidence that voter suppression affected the result of the election. In his first term as governor, Kemp opposed face mask mandates and stay-at-home orders during the COVID-19 pandemic, and prohibited localities from implementing stricter public health measures than the state as a whole. After the 2020 presidential election in Georgia, he faced criticism from President Donald Trump for certifying the results as required under state law, rejecting Trump's false claims of fraud in the election. In 2021, Kemp signed into law the Election Integrity Act of 2021, which expanded early in-person voting and increased the state government's control over local election officials.

In his 2022 reelection campaign, Kemp was challenged by former U.S. senator David Perdue in the Republican primary. Although Trump endorsed Perdue, Kemp defeated him in a landslide. In the general election, Kemp defeated Abrams in a rematch by a wider margin than in 2018; she conceded defeat on election night.

== Early life and education ==
Kemp was born in Athens, Georgia, the son of William L. Kemp II, into a prominent family with a history of political power. Kemp's maternal grandfather, Julian H. Cox, was a member of the Georgia Legislature.

Kemp attended the private Athens Academy until ninth grade, and then transferred to Clarke Central High School to play football for Billy Henderson; he graduated in 1982. In 1987, he graduated from the University of Georgia, where he majored in agriculture.

== Career ==
Kemp was a home builder and developer before entering politics. He founded Kemp Properties, a property management and real estate investment business, was a founding director of First Madison Bank, and served on the St. Mary's Hospital Board.

Kemp served as a Georgia state senator from 2003 to 2007 after defeating the Democratic incumbent, Doug Haines in District 46. In 2006, Kemp ran for Agriculture Commissioner of Georgia. He finished second in the primary, but lost the runoff to Gary Black. Kemp declared his candidacy for State Senate District 47 when incumbent Ralph Hudgens planned to run for Congress in Georgia's 10th congressional district, but Hudgens instead ran for reelection, changing Kemp's plans.

== Georgia Secretary of State (2010-2018) ==
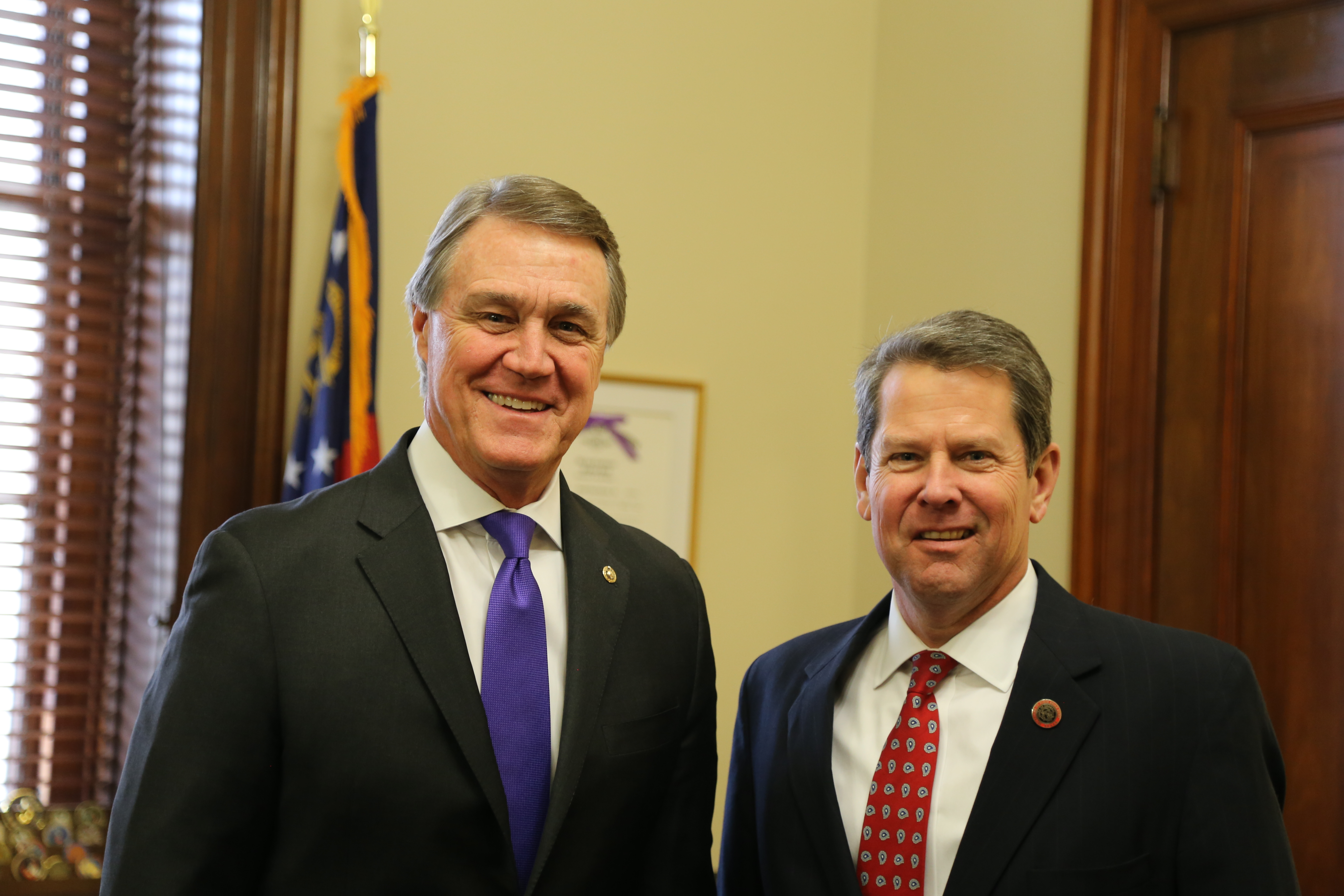
Kemp with U.S. Senator David Perdue in 2017

In early 2010, Kemp was appointed Georgia Secretary of State by then-governor Sonny Perdue. Kemp won the 2010 election for a full term as secretary of state with 56.4% of the vote, to 39.4% for Democratic nominee Georganna Sinkfield. Four years later, Kemp was reelected.

Kemp rejected the conclusion by the United States Intelligence Community that Russia interfered in the 2016 election. Amid Russian interference in the 2016 election, Kemp denounced the Obama administration's efforts to strengthen election system security, including improving access to federal cybersecurity assistance, calling the efforts an assault on states' rights.

After narrowly winning the 2018 gubernatorial election, Kemp resigned as secretary of state in anticipation of becoming governor.

=== Federal efforts to secure state voting systems ===
As evidence mounted that Russian hackers were attempting to disrupt the 2016 elections, President Obama directed Homeland Security Secretary Jeh Johnson to work with states to secure their voting systems as "critical infrastructure." Kemp was the only state election official to decline the help from Jeh Johnson. In a 2017 interview, he denounced the effort as an assault on states' rights, saying, "I think it was a politically calculated move by the previous administration" and "I don't necessarily believe" Russia had attempted to disrupt the elections. In August 2016, amid Russian attempts to disrupt the 2016 elections, Kemp said that an intrusion by Russian hackers into voting systems was "not probable at all, the way our systems are set up" and accused federal officials of exaggerating the threat of Russian interference.

Georgia was one of 14 states that used electronic voting machines that produced no paper record, which election integrity experts say left elections vulnerable to tampering and technical problems. The 2018 indictment against Russian hackers (as part of Special Counsel Robert Mueller's probe into 2016 interference) said that the Russian hackers targeted county websites in Georgia.

In December 2016, Kemp accused the Department of Homeland Security of attempting to hack his office's computer network, including the voter registration database, implying that it was retribution for his previous refusal to work with DHS. A DHS inspector general investigation found there was no hacking, but rather it was "the result of normal and automatic computer message exchanges generated by the Microsoft applications involved."

==== Exposure of personal voter data ====
In October 2015, the Georgia Secretary of State's office, under Kemp's leadership, illegally disclosed the personal information (including Social Security numbers and dates of birth) of 6.2 million registered Georgia voters. This data breach occurred when the office sent out a CD with this information to 12 organizations that purchase monthly voter lists from the office. The office was not aware of the breach until the next month, and did not publicly acknowledge it until The Atlanta Journal-Constitution reported the class action lawsuit against the office that resulted. Within a month of the breach becoming publicly known, it had cost taxpayers $1.2 million in credit monitoring services for those whose data had been compromised, and $395,000 for an audit into Kemp's handling of the unauthorized data disclosure.

Kemp drew criticism again in 2017 when it was revealed that a flaw in the state voting system exposed the personal information of over six million Georgia voters, as well as passwords used by county election officials to access voter files, to researchers at Kennesaw State University. The security flaw was fixed six months after it was reported to election authorities. After a lawsuit was filed, a server at the center of the controversy was wiped, preventing officials from determining the scope of the breach. Kemp denied responsibility, instead saying researchers at Kennesaw State University, who managed the system, had acted "in accordance with standard IT procedures" in deleting the data.

==== Massage Envy controversy ====
On September 5, 2018, an attack ad was released claiming that Kemp chose not to pursue accusations of sexual assault against therapists employed by Massage Envy during his time overseeing the Georgia Board of Massage Therapy because of donations made by franchisee owners to Kemp's campaign. The offenders were able to renew their Board licenses after the accusations. Republican State Senator Renee Unterman said that there "appears to be a direct connection between campaign support from Massage Envy franchisees in exchange for non-action and suppression" and asked U.S. Attorney B.J. Pak to investigate "what seems to be a quid pro quo scheme being perpetrated through the secretary of state's office and the Kemp for governor campaign." Kemp said that he had done nothing illegal.

In response to the accusations, a spokesperson for Kemp's campaign asserted that Unterman was "mentally unstable" and suggested she "seek immediate medical attention before she hurts herself or someone else". The Kemp campaign was criticized for its apparent reference to Unterman's history of depression, about which she had spoken publicly. In response, Unterman said she would not be "intimidated, blackmailed, belittled, or sexually harassed" into silence. Kemp's campaign did not apologize for the remarks.

==== Accusations of voter suppression ====
Kemp was accused by Democrats of voter suppression during the 2018 gubernatorial election. Political scientists Michael Bernhard and Daniel O'Neill described Kemp's actions as the worst case of voter suppression in that election year. The allegations arose from Kemp's actions as secretary of state: a few weeks before the election, he put 53,000 voter registration applications on hold, with 70% of the applicants being African American, and he purged 1.4 million inactive voters from voter rolls during his tenure, including 668,000 in 2017. Kemp denied engaging in voter suppression, stating that he was following federal and state law to update voter rolls with accurate information.

As a result of the controversies surrounding the 2018 Georgia midterms, critics have called Kemp's gubernatorial victory illegitimate. Glenn Kessler of The Washington Post noted such claims are "an article of faith among Democrats". Political scientists and news outlets have rejected these claims; The Atlanta Journal-Constitution wrote, "no evidence emerged of systematic malfeasance—or of enough tainted votes to force a runoff election between Republican Brian Kemp and Democrat Stacey Abrams". Political scientist Charles S. Bullock III told The Washington Post that claims of a stolen election were "not based on fact but will continue to be articulated by Abrams since it helps mobilize her supporters", while Richard Hasen took issue with Kemp's job performance but said that he had seen "no good social science evidence that efforts to make it harder to register and vote were responsible for Kemp's victory over Abrams in the Georgia gubernatorial race". A USA Today fact check noted that the actions Kemp's office took during the election "can be explained as routine under state and federal law". Hasen told PolitiFact, "I have seen no good evidence that the suppressive effects of strict voting and registration laws affected the outcome of the governor's races in Georgia and Florida" and suggested Democrats "cool it" with claims the election was stolen.

Kemp introduced a controversial "exact match" policy during his first year as secretary of state in 2010. Under the system, eligible Georgians were dropped from voter rolls for an errant hyphen or if "a stray letter or a typographical error on someone's voter registration card didn't match the records of the state's driver's license bureau or the Social Security office." In a 2010 explanation defending the practice to the Department of Justice, Kemp's office said the policy was "designed to assure the identity and eligibility of voters and to prevent fraudulent or erroneous registrations." The Department of Justice initially rejected the policy, but allowed it to go into effect with additional safeguards; a later lawsuit claimed "it is not apparent that the Secretary of State ever followed the safeguards." The process was halted after a lawsuit in 2016, but the state legislature passed a modified form of the policy in 2017 and the process began again.

Critics consider these types of "exact match" laws a form of voter suppression designed to disproportionately target minorities; and African-American, Asian, and Latino voters accounted for 76.3% of the registrations dropped from voter rolls between July 2015 and July 2017. Critics say that minority names are more likely to contain hyphens and less common spellings that lead to clerical mistakes, resulting in rejection of the registration. In a 2018 ruling against Kemp, District Judge Eleanor L. Ross said the system places a "severe burden" on voters.

After changes to the Voting Rights Act in 2012 gave states with a history of voter suppression more autonomy, Kemp's office oversaw the closing of 214 polling locations, 8% of the total in Georgia. The closings disproportionately affected African-American communities. A consultant recommended that seven of the nine county polling locations in majority-minority Randolph County be closed ahead of the 2018 midterm election for failure to comply with the Americans with Disabilities Act. After the American Civil Liberties Union challenged the plan, the locations were allowed to remain open. Kemp denied knowledge of the plan, but a slide from a presentation given by the consultant read, "Consolidation has come highly recommended by the Secretary of State and is already being adopted by several counties and is being seriously considered and being worked on by many more." Officials claim the locations were closed as a cost-saving measure.

Georgia has removed registered voters from voter rolls for not voting in consecutive elections more aggressively than any other state. Between 2012 and 2018, Kemp's office canceled over 1.4 million voters' registrations, with nearly 700,000 cancellations in 2017 alone. On a single night in July 2017, half a million voters, about 8% of all registered Georgia voters, had their registrations canceled, an act The Atlanta Journal-Constitution said "may represent the largest mass disenfranchisement in US history." Kemp oversaw the removals as secretary of state, and did so eight months after declaring his candidacy for governor.

By early October 2018, Kemp's office had put more than 53,000 voter registration applications on hold, with more than 75% belonging to minorities. Voters whose registrations are put on hold are eligible to re-register if they still live in Georgia and have not died. An investigative journalism group run by Greg Palast found that, of the approximately 534,000 Georgians whose voter registrations were purged between 2016 and 2017, more than 334,000 still lived where they were registered. The voters were given no notice that they had been purged. Palast sued Kemp, claiming over 300,000 voters were purged illegally. Kemp's office denied any wrongdoing, saying that by "regularly updating our rolls, we prevent fraud and ensure that all votes are cast by eligible Georgia voters."

After Totenberg's ruling, thousands of voting machines were sequestered by local election officials on Election Day in 2018, an action critics said was designed to increase wait times at polling locations. The sequestration of machines disproportionately affected counties that favored Kemp's opponent and caused voters in some locations to have to wait in line for hours in inclement weather. Other locations suffered delays because machines were delivered without power cords. Kemp himself experienced technical problems attempting to vote in the election.

Kemp opposes automatic voter registration. In a leaked 2018 recording, he said that attempts to register all eligible voters "continues to concern us, especially if everybody uses and exercises their right to vote." In a separate 2018 recording made by a progressive group he said, "Democrats are working hard ... registering all these minority voters that are out there and others that are sitting on the sidelines. If they can do that, they can win these elections in November."

On November 4, 2018, 48 hours before his gubernatorial election, the secretary of state's office published the details of a zero day flaw in the state registration website, accusing Democrats of attempted hacking for investigating the problem but providing no evidence. Critics have said the announcement was further evidence of voter suppression and gave hackers a window of opportunity during which voter registration records could be changed. In response to criticisms of the announcement, Kemp said, "I'm not worried about how it looks. I'm doing my job." In a ruling on the matter, Totenberg criticized Kemp for having "delayed in grappling with the heightened critical cybersecurity issues of our era posed [by] the state's dated, vulnerable voting system" and said the system "poses a concrete risk of alteration of ballot counts." In December 2018, The Atlanta Journal-Constitution found that Kemp made the hacking allegations without any evidence. The Journal-Constitution wrote that Kemp might have made the unsubstantiated accusations against Democrats as a ploy and diversion to help him win the election; the "examination suggests Kemp and his aides used his elected office to protect his political campaign from a potentially devastating embarrassment. Their unsubstantiated claims came at a pivotal moment, as voters were making their final decisions in an election that had attracted intense national attention."

==== Congressional investigation ====
On December 4, 2018, U.S. Representative Elijah Cummings, the incoming chairman of the House Committee on Oversight and Government Reform, announced that he would like to call Kemp before Congress to testify about the fairness of his actions during the 2018 elections. "I want to be able to bring people in, like the new governor-to-be of Georgia, to explain ... to us why is it fair for wanting to be secretary of state and be running [for governor]," Cummings said.

On March 6, 2019, it was revealed that both Kemp and his successor as secretary of state, Brad Raffensperger, were under investigation by the House Oversight and Reform Committee for alleged voter suppression in the 2018 elections. Cummings oversaw the investigation. Kemp was given until March 20, 2019, to comply with document requests or face a subpoena.

== Governor of Georgia (2019-present) ==
=== Gubernatorial elections ===
==== 2018 ====
Final results by county in 2018: Brian Kemp: >90%; 80–90%; 70–80%; 60–70%; 50–60%; Stacey Abrams: 80–90%; 70–80%; 60–70%; 50–60%; 40–50%

The primary elections were held on May 22, 2018, and a primary runoff was held on July 24, 2018, between Republican candidates Kemp and Lieutenant Governor Casey Cagle; Kemp prevailed, leveraging leaked private recordings of Cagle in which Cagle said he backed "bad public policy" for political gain and the Republican primary would come down to "who had the biggest gun, who had the biggest truck and who could be the craziest". These leaked recordings and Trump's endorsement were seen as critical to Kemp's runoff win. Term limits prevented incumbent governor Nathan Deal from seeking a third term. Stacey Abrams won the Democratic primary with over 75% of the vote, allowing her to avoid a runoff.

During the general election campaign, Kemp provoked controversy with multiple ads, including one in which he posed with rifles and a shotgun that he jokingly pointed at a teenager who "wanted to date his daughter", and one in which he said his truck was for "rounding up criminal illegals". The lack of proper gun safety in handling the shotgun in the "Jake" ad attracted criticism from the National Law Enforcement Partnership to Prevent Gun Violence, which said the ad "delivers a message perpetuating domestic violence and misogyny while modeling egregiously unsafe behavior", and prompted criticism that the ad depicted irresponsible handling of guns. Kemp's supporters, by contrast, viewed the ad as a "lighthearted portrayal of a protective, gun-wielding Southern father vetting a potential suitor", and Kemp dismissed the criticism, telling critics, "Get over it."

In the November 6 general election, Kemp declared victory over Abrams. The next morning, he resigned as Secretary of State. On November 16, every county certified their votes with Kemp leading by roughly 55,000 votes. Shortly after the certification, Abrams suspended her campaign; she accepted Kemp as the legal winner of the election while refusing to say that the election was legitimate. Abrams has since claimed numerous instances of election activity that allegedly unfairly affected the results. Following the election, Abrams and her organization Fair Fight filed several lawsuits challenging the constitutionality and Voting Rights Act compliance of Georgia's voting laws, some of which are still pending.

Kemp prevailed by 54,723 votes, defeating Abrams 50.2–48.8%. The 2018 gubernatorial election was the closest governor's race in Georgia since 1966.

==== 2022 ====
Final results by county in 2022: Brian Kemp: >90%; 80–90%; 70–80%; 60–70%; 50–60%; Stacey Abrams: 80–90%; 70–80%; 60–70%; 50–60%

During the primary election, Kemp was endorsed by former Vice President Mike Pence. He faced a primary challenge from former U.S. Senator David Perdue, who was endorsed by former President Donald Trump after Kemp refused to overturn the results of the 2020 presidential election in Georgia. Kemp defeated Perdue in the primary, 73.7% to 21.8%. Trump endorsed Kemp in the general election.

Abrams was once again the Democratic nominee. This was Georgia's first gubernatorial rematch since 1950.

In the general election, Kemp won reelection to a second term, defeating Abrams by 7.5%. Abrams conceded on election night. He was sworn in for a second term on January 12, 2023.

2026

Kemp is ineligible for a third term. There was speculation that he would run in the 2026 United States Senate election in Georgia to challenge incumbent senator Jon Ossoff; in May 2025, he declined to run and endorsed Derek Dooley.

=== Tenure ===
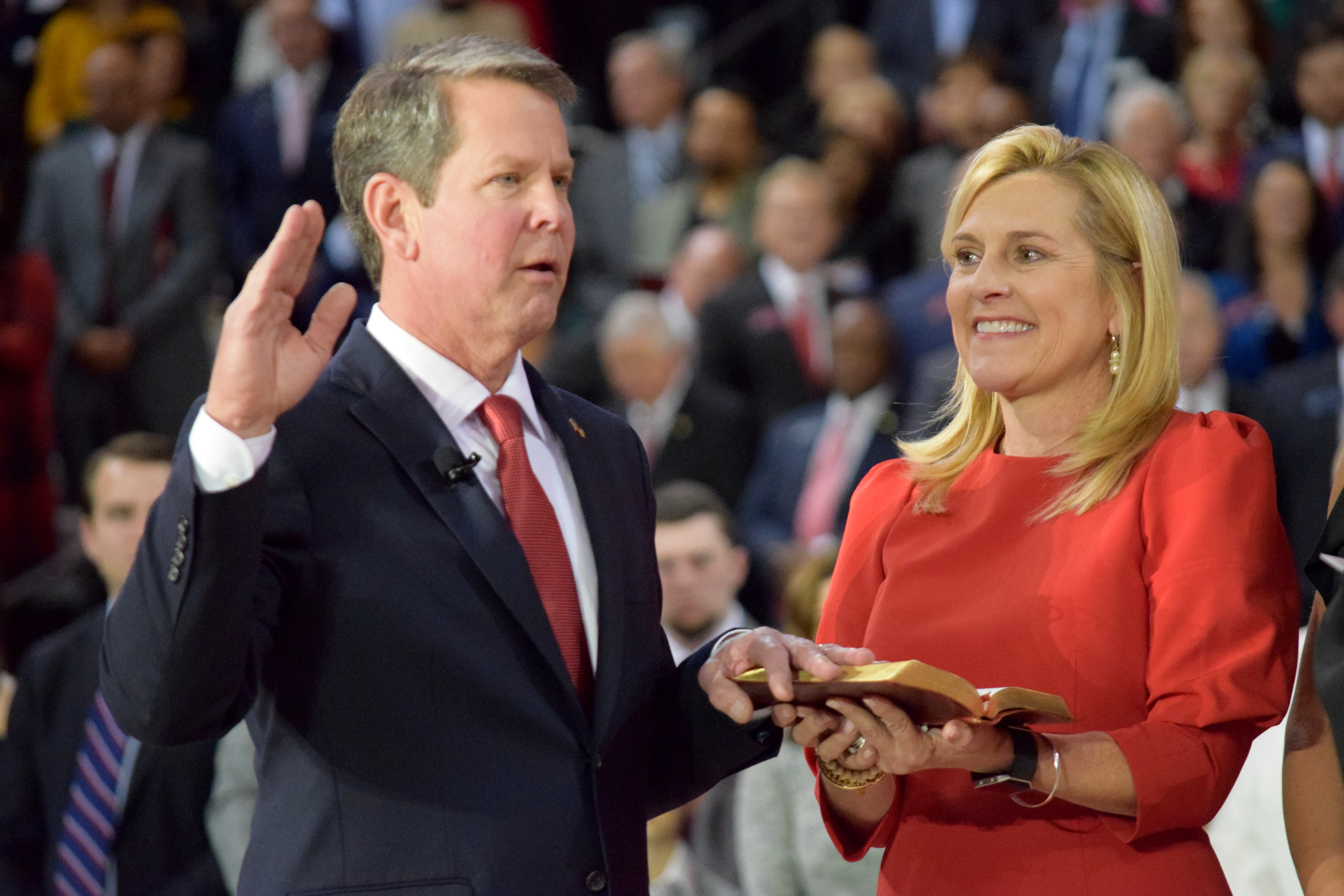
Kemp with his wife Marty as he takes the oath of office as Georgia's 83rd governor

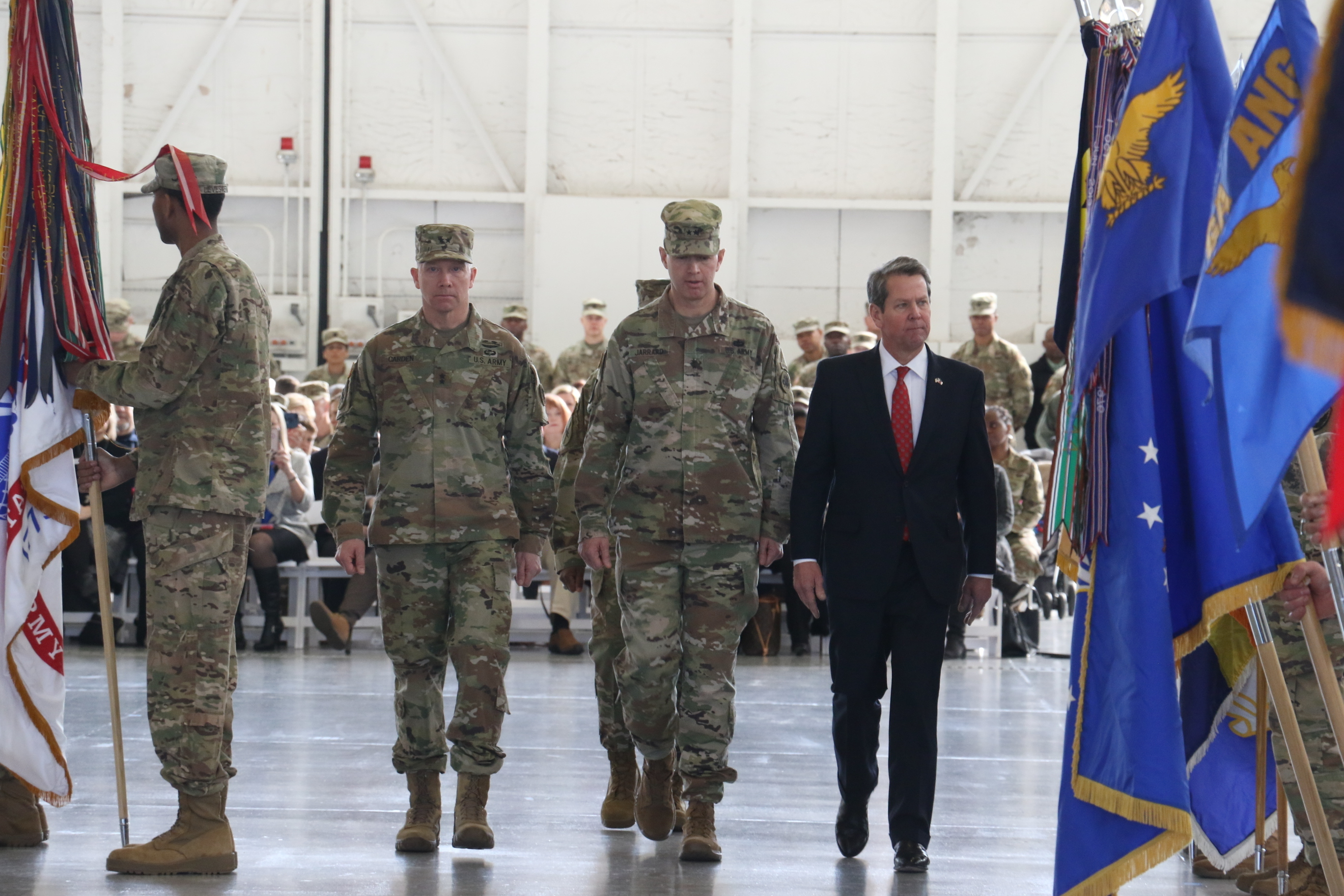
Maj. Gen. Thomas Carden, Maj. Gen. Joe Jarrard, and Governor Brian Kemp review the troops during the Georgia National Guard change of command ceremony on Clay National Guard Center January 26, 2019.

Kemp was inaugurated as governor in a public ceremony in Atlanta on January 14, 2019. He was inaugurated for his second term on January 9, 2023. As governor, Kemp has been called "staunchly" conservative, signing strict anti-abortion laws, expanding gun rights, and overhauling election rules after Trump's 2020 defeat.

In September 2025, Kemp announced that the Georgia National Guard would support President Trump's intervention in the District of Columbia.

==== Abortion ====
In May 2019, Kemp signed into law a highly controversial bill that would prohibit abortions after a heartbeat can be detected in a fetus, which is usually when a woman is six weeks pregnant; the legislation was one of the country's strictest anti-abortion laws. The legislation was blocked by federal courts, which ruled the law unconstitutional: a preliminary injunction entered in October 2019 blocked the legislation from going into effect, and a permanent injunction entered in July 2020 permanently voided the law. This injunction was later overturned with the 2022 Supreme Court decision Dobbs v. Jackson Women's Health Organization. Kemp has also publicly stated his support for a "statewide ban on the destruction of embryos".

The abortion ban has vague and conflicting exceptions that ostensibly protect the life of the mother. According to Kemp, the law keeps women "safe, healthy and informed". In practice, the exceptions are so vague and contradictory that physicians are reluctant to provide abortions even when the mother's life is at imminent risk. By 2024, at least two women had died in Georgia after they were unable to access legal abortions and timely medical care.

==== Election law ====
In April 2019, Kemp signed legislation into law addressing some criticisms that arose from the contested 2018 election; the new law provides that polling places cannot be changed 60 days before an election, that county election officials cannot reject absentee ballots because of mismatched signatures, and that a voter whose voter registration application information does not match other government databases will not be removed from the voter rolls for this reason.

In March 2021, Kemp signed SB 202, which expanded early in-person voting, enacted ID requirements for absentee voting, gave the legislature power to overrule or replace local election officials, and banned anyone other than election workers from providing food or water to voters waiting in line.

In May 2024, Kemp signed three election bills into law.

==== Economy ====
Kemp visited Swainsboro in September 2019 to announce the creation of a rural "strike team" focusing on economic development in rural areas of the state.

==== Tariffs and trade ====
Kemp has called the Trump administration's tariffs on China a "good move", saying that China is "a big trading partner" but has "been ripping us off in a lot of different ways". China is Georgia's third-biggest trading partner, in goods ranging from aerospace parts to poultry.

==== Healthcare ====
Kemp has supported efforts to overturn the Affordable Care Act, as well as efforts to hinder the functioning of the Affordable Care Act for Georgia residents. Kemp and Republicans in the Georgia legislature have opposed full Medicaid expansion. Kemp has sought to introduce work requirements for Medicaid recipients.

==== Key appointments ====
After Johnny Isakson announced that he would resign from the U.S. Senate on December 31, 2019, Kemp appointed businesswoman Kelly Loeffler to complete Isakson's term on December 4. Loeffler was sworn into office on January 6, 2020, but lost the seat to Democrat Raphael Warnock in the special election held for it.

==== State judiciary ====
Kemp appointed Carla Wong McMillian to fill a vacancy on the Supreme Court of Georgia caused by the retirement of Robert Benham.

Despite a regular election to the Supreme Court of Georgia being scheduled for November 2020, Kemp canceled the election when Judge Keith R. Blackwell announced he would retire between the scheduled election and the end of his term.

==== COVID-19 pandemic ====
On April 1, 2020, Kemp announced a statewide stay-at-home order to combat the COVID-19 pandemic. He was among the last governors to issue a stay-at-home order, as a national emergency was declared three weeks earlier, on March 13. As he issued the order, Kemp said he had become aware the coronavirus could be spread by asymptomatic people only that day, despite warnings from health officials made months earlier. At the end of April, Kemp lifted the stay-at-home order over the opposition of mayors and against the advice of public health experts and the Centers for Disease Control and Prevention.

While many other states were implementing face mask mandates, Kemp prohibited localities from implementing stricter public health measures than the state. In response, localities filed lawsuits against Kemp. In July, Kemp prohibited Georgia cities and counties from requiring face masks to halt the virus's spread. At the time, coronavirus cases were surging in many states, and other states were implementing statewide mask mandates. By mid-July 2020, more than 127,000 COVID-19 cases had been reported in Georgia, with 3,000 deaths.

In March 2021, Kemp expressed opposition to a $1.9 trillion COVID-19 relief bill passed by Congress.

==== Guns ====
On April 12, 2022, Kemp signed Senate bill 319, making Georgia the 25th constitutional carry state. He also signed SB 318, which extended reciprocity to out-of-state carry licenses. After the Apalachee school shooting left four dead and nine wounded, Kemp refused to acknowledge Democrats' calls for a special legislative session on gun control. "Today is not the day for politics or policy", he said. In 2024, Kemp signed House Bill 1018, the "Second Amendment Privacy Act". This legislation prevents financial institutions from using a merchant category code to separate or track ammunition and firearms purchases. He praised by the NRA and other gun-rights advocacy groups. This was in response to states like California that have encouraged the collection of such data.

=== Job approval ===
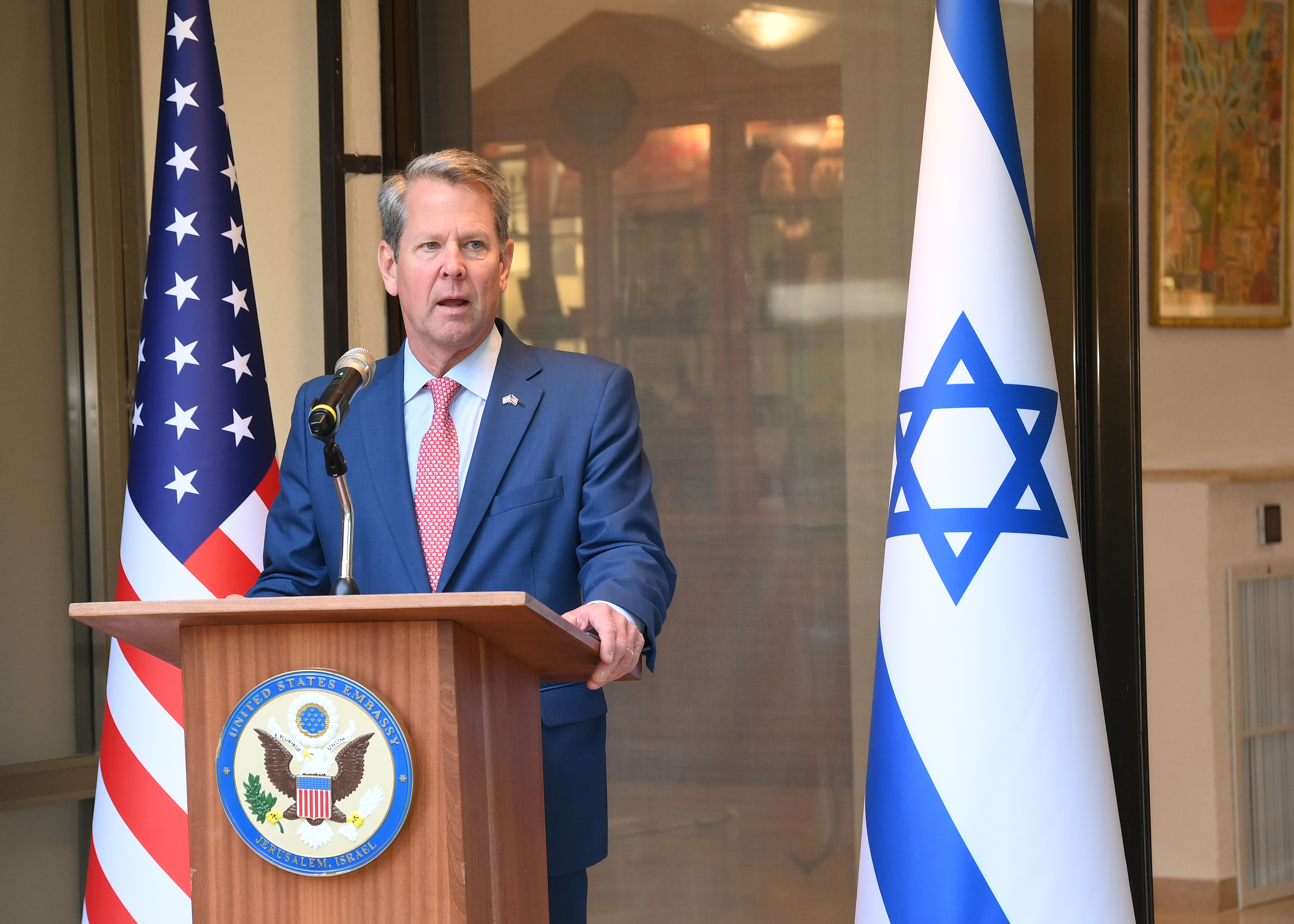
Kemp speaking at the American Embassy in Jerusalem in 2023

In an April 2019 Atlanta Journal-Constitution (AJC) poll, Kemp had a 46 percent job approval rating among Georgians. In July of that year, another poll showed that Kemp's ratings had risen to 52 percent approving, making him the 22nd-most popular governor in the country. A May 2020 Ipsos poll showed that Kemp's job approval rating had declined to 39 percent among Georgians, making him among the nation's least popular governors; his low popularity was attributed to his handling of the coronavirus crisis. In November 2020, Kemp's approval rating fell to 37 percent, according to an IAG/Fox 5 poll.

In January 2021, an AJC poll showed his approval rating had rebounded to 43 percent, and by May it was up to 45 percent. In April 2022, his approval rating had reached 50 percent, according to a Morning Consult poll. In October 2022, one month before the 2022 gubernatorial election, Kemp's approval rating among Georgians stood at 54 percent. At the beginning of his second term in 2023, his approval rating surged to 62 percent, according to an AJC poll; it peaked at 64 percent the following year. A October 2026 poll found Kemp's approval rating at 70%, even as President Trump had a net negative approval rating in the state.

==== Relationship with Donald Trump ====
In a November 2020 Fox News interview, Donald Trump said he was "ashamed" of having supported Kemp's 2018 gubernatorial campaign. Trump added that Kemp had "done absolutely nothing" to challenge the result of the 2020 election in Georgia, in which Joe Biden defeated Trump by 11,779 votes, the first time since 1992 that Georgia voted for the Democratic nominee for president. Kemp and Lieutenant Governor Geoff Duncan put out a joint statement explaining that calling a joint session of the Georgia General Assembly to appoint their own electors to send to the United States Electoral College would be unconstitutional.

In December 2020, Trump called for Kemp's resignation. The same month, attorney Lin Wood, acting separately from the Trump campaign, called for both Kemp's and Georgia Secretary of State Brad Raffensperger's imprisonment.

In January 2021, Trump criticized Kemp for certifying Georgia's results. This resulted in speculation that he would face a Trump-backed primary challenger in 2022.

In March 2021, Kemp said he would support Trump if he ran for president again in 2024.

In September 2021, Trump implied at a rally in Perry, Georgia, that he would like Kemp's 2018 Democratic opponent Stacey Abrams to replace him, saying, "Stacey, would you like to take his place? It's okay with me." In December 2021, David Perdue announced his candidacy for governor, with Trump's endorsement. In May 2022, Kemp announced he had the support of former Vice President Mike Pence.

In March 2024, Kemp endorsed Trump's 2024 presidential campaign. In June, he said he did not vote for Trump in the state's primary (Trump was the only active candidate), but made clear he would support him in November and work to elect him. In July, Kemp traveled to Wisconsin for the 2024 Republican National Convention, where he told the Atlanta Journal-Constitution of Trump's platform for the Republican party, "it doesn't really matter what we think".

In August, at an Atlanta rally, Trump criticized Kemp and his wife for 10 minutes, saying "he is a bad guy. He's a disloyal guy. And he's a very average governor...little Brian, little Brian Kemp". In response Kemp asked Trump on social media to cease "engaging in petty personal insults" and to "leave my family out of it".

Apart from an event focused on the damage from Hurricane Helene, Kemp and Trump did not appear or campaign together in the 2024 US elections.

==== Labor unions ====
In 2024, Kemp joined five other Republican governors (Kay Ivey, Tate Reeves, Henry McMaster, Bill Lee, and Greg Abbott) in a statement opposing the United Auto Workers unionization campaign.

== Personal life ==
Kemp married Marty Argo, daughter of longtime Georgia House of Representatives member Bob Argo, on January 8, 1994; they have three daughters. The family belongs to Emmanuel Episcopal Church in Athens.

In May 2018, Kemp was sued for failure to repay $500,000 in business loans. The suit was related to his having personally guaranteed $10 million in business loans to Hart AgStrong, a Kentucky-based canola crushing company. The company was under investigation after making guarantees using assets it did not own and repaying suppliers using proceeds from insurance settlements. An attorney for the Georgia Department of Agriculture said these actions "may be a felony under Georgia law." No charges were filed, and Kemp and the plaintiff reached a settlement shortly before he became governor.

In October 2018, Atlanta television station WAGA-TV reported that companies Kemp owned had owed more than $800,000 in loans to a community bank where he is a founding board member and stockholder. Such "insider loans" are legal as long as they are on the same terms as the bank would extend to any other borrower. Kemp's campaign declined to publicize the terms of the loan.

== Electoral history ==
Georgia State Senate 46th district election, 2002
Party	Candidate	Votes	%
Republican	Brian Kemp	17,504	50.7
Democratic	Doug Haines (incumbent)	17,015	49.3

Georgia State Senate 46th district election, 2004
Party	Candidate	Votes	%
Republican	Brian Kemp (incumbent)	29,424	51.6
Democratic	Becky Vaughn	27,617	48.4

Georgia Commissioner of Agriculture Republican Primary election, 2006
Party	Candidate	Votes	%
Republican	Gary Black	153,568	42
Republican	Brian Kemp	97,113	27
Republican	Bob Greer	57,813	16
Republican	Deana Strickland	54,318	15

Georgia Commissioner of Agriculture Republican runoff election, 2006
Party	Candidate	Votes	%
Republican	Gary Black	101,274	60
Republican	Brian Kemp	67,509	40

Georgia Secretary of State Republican primary election, 2010
Party	Candidate	Votes	%
Republican	Brian Kemp (incumbent)	361,304	59.2
Republican	Doug MacGinnitie	248,911	40.8

Georgia Secretary of State, 2010
Party	Candidate	Votes	%
Republican	Brian Kemp (incumbent)	1,440,188	56.4
Democratic	Georganna Sinkfield	1,006,411	39.4
Libertarian	David Chastain	106,123	4.2

Georgia Secretary of State, 2014
Party	Candidate	Votes	%
Republican	Brian Kemp (incumbent)	1,452,554	57.5
Democratic	Doreen Carter	1,075,101	42.5

Georgia Gubernatorial Republican primary, 2018
Party	Candidate	Votes	%
Republican	Casey Cagle	236,498	39.0
Republican	Brian Kemp	154,913	25.5
Republican	Hunter Hill	111,207	18.3
Republican	Clay Tippins	74,053	12.2
Republican	Michael Williams	29,554	4.9
Republican	Eddie Hayes	739	0.1

Georgia Gubernatorial Republican runoff election, 2018
Party	Candidate	Votes	%
Republican	Brian Kemp	406,638	69.5
Republican	Casey Cagle	178,877	30.6

Georgia Gubernatorial election, 2018
Party	Candidate	Votes	%
Republican	Brian Kemp	1,978,408	50.2
Democratic	Stacey Abrams	1,923,685	48.8
Libertarian	Ted Metz	37,235	1.0

Georgia Gubernatorial Republican primary, 2022
Party	Candidate	Votes	%
Republican	Brian Kemp (incumbent)	887,389	73.7
Republican	David Perdue	262,118	21.8
Republican	Kandiss Taylor	41,183	3.4
Republican	Catherine Davis	9,775	0.8
Republican	Tom Williams	3,252	0.3

Georgia Gubernatorial election, 2022
Party	Candidate	Votes	%
Republican	Brian Kemp (incumbent)	2,111,572	53.4
Democratic	Stacey Abrams	1,813,673	45.9
Libertarian	Shane T. Hazel	28,163	0.7

Political offices
Preceded by Karen Handel	Secretary of State of Georgia; 2010–2018	Succeeded by Robyn Crittenden
Preceded by Nathan Deal	Governor of Georgia; 2019–present	Incumbent
Party political offices
Preceded by Karen Handel	Republican nominee for Secretary of State of Georgia; 2010, 2014	Succeeded by Brad Raffensperger
Preceded by Nathan Deal	Republican nominee for Governor of Georgia; 2018, 2022	Succeeded by Rick Jackson
Preceded by Bill Lee	Chair of the Republican Governors Association; 2024–2025	Succeeded by Greg Gianforte
U.S. order of precedence (ceremonial)
Preceded by JD Vance as Vice President	Order of precedence of the United States; Within Georgia	Succeeded by Mayor of city in which event is held
Preceded by JD Vance as Vice President	Order of precedence of the United States; Within Georgia	Succeeded by Otherwise Mike Johnson as Speaker of the House
Preceded by Mikie Sherrill as Governor of New Jersey	Order of precedence of the United States; Outside Georgia	Succeeded by Ned Lamont as Governor of Connecticut
