= Buddy Carter =

American politician (born 1957)

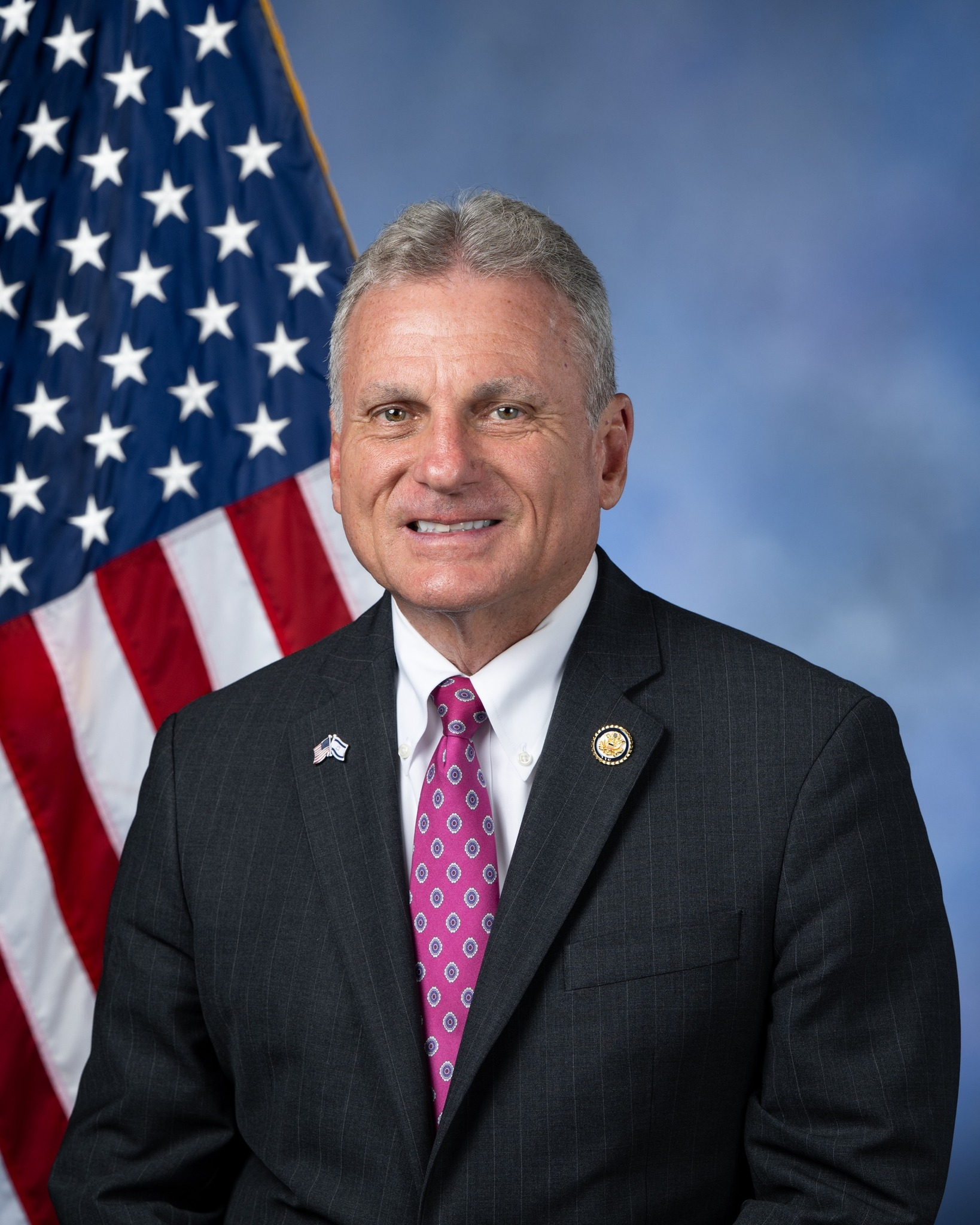
- Official portrait, 2025

Member of the U.S. House of Representatives from Georgia's 1st district
- Incumbent
- Assumed office January 3, 2015
- Preceded by: Jack Kingston

Member of the Georgia State Senate from the 1st district
- In office November 22, 2009 – 2014
- Preceded by: Eric Johnson
- Succeeded by: Ben Watson

Member of the Georgia House of Representatives from the 159th district
- In office January 10, 2005 – September 15, 2009
- Succeeded by: Ann Purcell

Personal details
- Born: Earl LeRoy Carter; September 6, 1957 (age 69) Port Wentworth, Georgia, U.S.
- Party: Republican
- Spouse: Amy
- Children: 3
- Education: Young Harris College (AA); University of Georgia (BS)
- Website: House website Campaign website
- Carter's voice Carter on Jewish American Heritage Month; Recorded May 25, 2023

Earl LeRoy "Buddy" Carter (born September 6, 1957) is an American politician serving as the U.S. representative for Georgia's 1st congressional district since 2015. A member of the Republican Party, Carter was a member of the Georgia State Senate from 2009 to 2014.

In 2026, Carter was a candidate in the U.S. Senate election in Georgia, losing the Republican primary to Mike Collins and Derek Dooley after getting a little over 25% of the vote.

== Early life and education ==
Carter graduated in 1975 from Robert W. Groves High School in Garden City, Georgia. He earned an associate degree from Young Harris College in 1977 and a Bachelor of Science in pharmacy from the University of Georgia in 1980.

== Local politics and state legislature ==
Carter served on the planning and zoning commission for the city of Pooler from 1989 to 1993 and on Pooler's city council from 1994 to 1995. He served as Pooler's mayor from 1996 to 2004.

Carter served as a Georgia state representative (2005–2009) and Georgia state senator (2009–2014). He sat on the Senate Appropriations, Health and Human Services, Higher Education, and Public Safety committees.

== U.S. House of Representatives ==
=== Elections ===
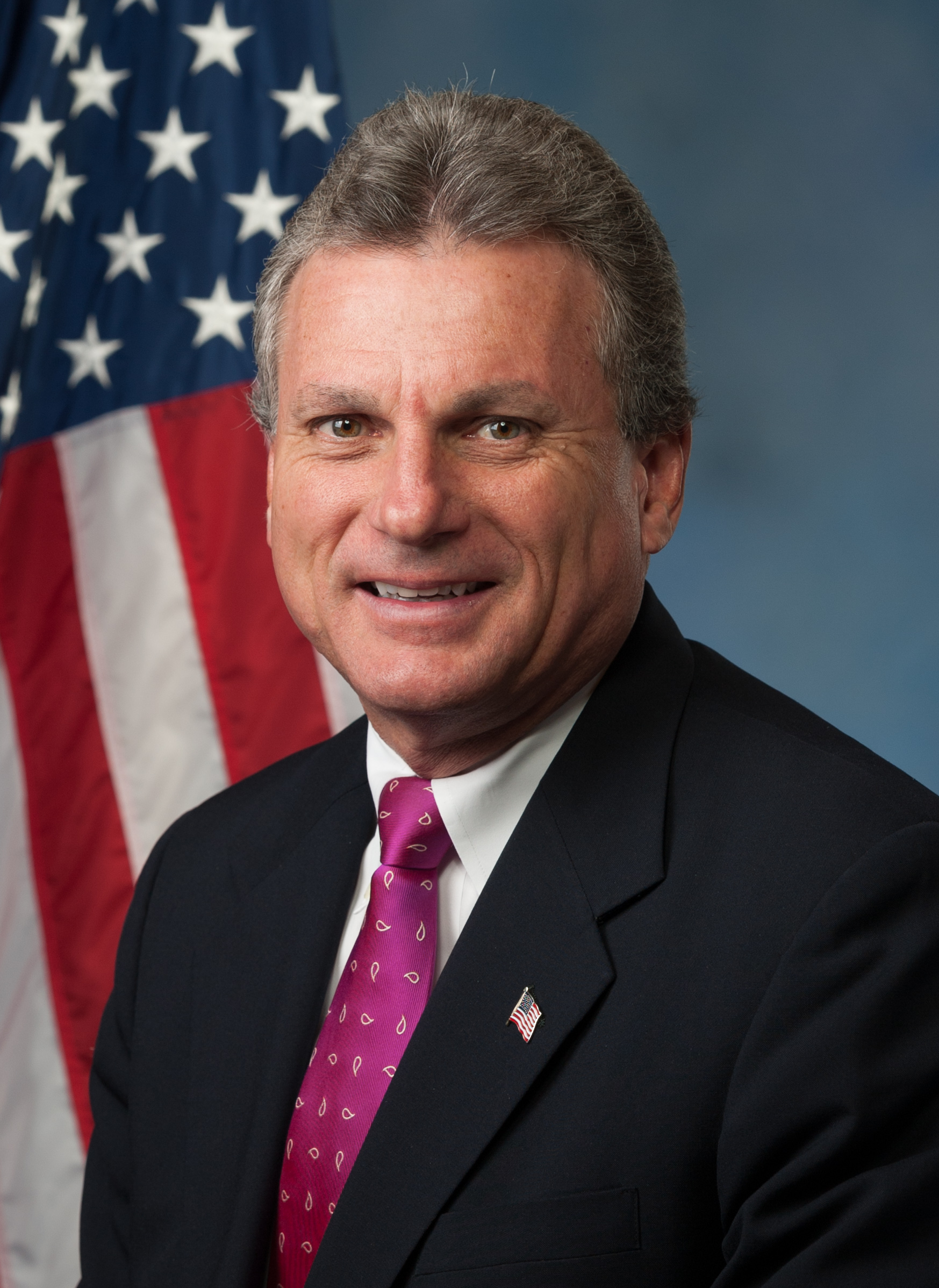
Carter during the 114th United States Congress

Carter gave up his state senate seat in 2014 to run for Congress after 22-year incumbent Jack Kingston announced he was running for the United States Senate. He finished first in the six-way Republican primary with 36% of the vote, short of the 51% required for outright victory. He then defeated Bob Johnson in the runoff with 53% of the vote. In the general election, he defeated the Democratic nominee, Brian Reese, with 60.9% of the vote, carrying all but two counties in the district. In 2016, he was unopposed in both the primary and general elections, and received over 99% of the vote against a write-in candidate.

Carter was reelected in 2018, 2020, and 2022.

=== Committee assignments ===
For the 119th Congress:

- Committee on Energy and Commerce
  - Subcommittee on Communications and Technology
  - Subcommittee on Environment
  - Subcommittee on Health (Chair)
- Committee on the Budget

=== Caucus memberships ===
- Congressional Blockchain Caucus
- Congressional Western Caucus
- House Baltic Caucus
- Republican Study Committee
- Republican Governance Group
- United States Congressional International Conservation Caucus
- U.S.–Japan Caucus

== U.S. Senate campaign ==
Carter announced his candidacy to challenge Democrat Jon Ossoff in the 2026 United States Senate election in Georgia.

As the first Republican to announce his candidacy, Carter's announcement branded himself as a "MAGA warrior". He was eliminated in the 2026 Georgia Republican United States primary after finishing third behind Representative Mike Collins and Derek Dooley.

== Political positions ==
=== 2020 presidential election ===
Carter supported Donald Trump's attempts to overturn the 2020 U.S. presidential election and has promoted Trump's false claims of a stolen election. He called for the results of the 2020 U.S. presidential election in Georgia to not be certified, and was part of a group of Republican legislators who unsuccessfully challenged votes for Joe Biden during the 2021 United States Electoral College vote count, even though federal agencies and courts overseeing the election found no evidence of electoral fraud.

=== Abortion ===
Carter supported the U.S. Supreme Court's decision in Dobbs v. Jackson Women's Health Organization, which overruled Roe v. Wade. He believes abortion laws should be made by individual states.

=== Agriculture ===
In 2023, Carter was among 16 House Republicans who signed a letter to the House Agriculture Committee opposing the inclusion of the Ending Agricultural Trade Suppression (EATS) Act in the 2023 farm bill. The EATS Act would have invalidated certain state and local laws regulating agricultural products sold across state lines, including farm animal welfare laws like California's Proposition 12, which requires that pork, egg, and veal products sold within the state adhere to minimum animal space requirements. The letter argued that the legislation would infringe on states' rights and harm U.S. national security by unfairly advantaging the Chinese-owned pork producer WH Group and its subsidiary Smithfield Foods.

=== Drug policy ===
In 2017, Carter renewed his push to drug-test people who receive unemployment insurance.

On April 1, 2022, Carter voted against the Marijuana Opportunity Reinvestment and Expungement Act, which would have decriminalized cannabis at the federal level, allowing states to set their own policies.

=== Foreign relations ===
Carter voted to provide Israel with support following the 2023 Hamas attack on Israel.

In 2025, Carter introduced a bill authorizing President Trump to purchase or otherwise acquire Greenland and rename it "Red, White, and Blueland".

=== Gun policy ===
Carter is a supporter of gun rights, and has an "A" grade from the National Rifle Association Political Victory Fund for his stances on gun issues.

In February 2018, during a town hall in Hinesville, when asked about mass shootings in America, Carter told attendees to not look to Congress for answers about gun violence, saying Congress is not responsible for gun violence in America.

=== Health care ===
Carter supports the repeal of the Affordable Care Act (Obamacare).

On July 26, 2017, Carter was asked during a live television interview if he supported Trump's criticism of U.S. Senator Lisa Murkowski for her opposition to the procedural vote to begin the Senate's healthcare debate. Carter said he did, adding, "Somebody needs to go over there to that Senate and snatch a knot in their ass." The incident prompted widespread media coverage.

=== Immigration ===
Carter co-sponsored a bill that would let illegal immigrants serve in the U.S. military in exchange for legal residency.

Carter wants to prohibit all federal funding from sanctuary cities in Georgia (sanctuary cities prohibit city officials from asking about a person's immigration status when they report an unrelated crime). He also said he would like to test the huge backlog of rape kits in Georgia, except in sanctuary cities.

Carter spearheaded efforts to expand privatized immigrant detention and processing in Georgia, coordinating with Charlton County and the D. Ray James Correctional Facility.

=== LGBT rights ===
In 2017, Carter said he supported a ban on transgender people serving in the military.

=== Tax policy ===
Carter voted for the Tax Cuts and Jobs Act of 2017, saying he believed it would make businesses in his district more competitive in a global market.

=== 2026 Iran massacres ===
During the 2026 Iran massacres, a group of Iranian Americans in Atlanta, Georgia, protested the employment of Fatemeh Ardeshir-Larijani - daughter of Ali Larijani, the secretary of the Supreme National Security Council who has been accused of being the mastermind of the massacres - outside her place of employment at the Winship Cancer Institute. Ardeshir-Larijani was fired from her position following the protests. Carter has demanded that Ardeshir-Larijani's medical license to treat patients in the United States be revoked, calling it a threat to national security.

== Personal life ==
Carter and his wife, Amy, have three adult sons.

Carter is a Methodist. He is not related to late former U.S. President Jimmy Carter, who was also from Georgia.

== Electoral history ==
Georgia 159th State House District Republican Primary, 2004
Party	Candidate	Votes	%
Republican	Buddy Carter	3,254	53.97
Republican	Purcell	2,775	46.03
Total votes		6,029	100.0

Georgia 159th State House District General Election, 2004
Party	Candidate	Votes	%
Republican	Buddy Carter	16,602	100.0
Total votes		16,602	100.0

Georgia 159th State House District General Election, 2006
Party	Candidate	Votes	%
Republican	Buddy Carter (incumbent)	11,851	100.0
Total votes		11,851	100.0

Georgia 159th State House District General Election, 2008
Party	Candidate	Votes	%
Republican	Buddy Carter (incumbent)	24,026	100.0
Total votes		24,026	100.0

Georgia 1st State Senate District Special Election, 2009
Party	Candidate	Votes	%
Republican	Buddy Carter	10,904	82.14
Republican	Hair	2,371	17.86
Total votes		13,275	100.0

Georgia 1st State Senate District General Election, 2010
Party	Candidate	Votes	%
Republican	Buddy Carter (incumbent)	34,890	70.32
Democratic	Carry Smith	14,723	29.68
Total votes		49,613	100.0

Georgia 1st State Senate District General Election, 2012
Party	Candidate	Votes	%
Republican	Buddy Carter (incumbent)	53,821	100.0
Total votes		53,821	100.0

Georgia's 1st congressional district Republican Primary, 2014
Party	Candidate	Votes	%
Republican	E. L. 'Buddy' Carter	18,971	36.22
Republican	Robert E. 'Bob' Johnson	11,890	22.70
Republican	John A. McCallum	10,715	20.46
Republican	J. L. 'Jeff' Chapman	6,918	13.21
Republican	Darwin Carter	2,819	5.38
Republican	Earl T. Martin	1,063	2.03
Total votes		52,376	100.0

Georgia's 1st congressional district Republican Run-off Primary, 2014
Party	Candidate	Votes	%
Republican	E. L. 'Buddy' Carter	22,871	53.81
Republican	Robert E. 'Bob' Johnson	19,632	46.19
Total votes		42,503	100.0

Georgia's 1st congressional district General Election, 2014
Party	Candidate	Votes	%
Republican	E. L. 'Buddy' Carter	95,337	60.91
Democratic	Brian Corwin Reese	61,175	39.09
Total votes		156,512	100.0

Georgia's 1st congressional district General Election, 2016
Party	Candidate	Votes	%
Republican	Earl "Buddy" Carter (incumbent)	210,243	99.59
Write-in	Nathan Russo	869	0.41
Total votes		211,112	100.0

Georgia's 1st congressional district General Election, 2018
Party	Candidate	Votes	%
Republican	Earl L. 'Buddy' Carter (incumbent)	144,741	57.74
Democratic	Lisa M. Ring	105,942	42.26
Total votes		250,683	100.0

Georgia's 1st congressional district General Election, 2020
Party	Candidate	Votes	%
Republican	Earl L. 'Buddy' Carter (incumbent)	189,457	58.35
Democratic	Joyce Marie Griggs	135,238	41.65
Total votes		324,695	100.0

Georgia's 1st congressional district General Election, 2022
Party	Candidate	Votes	%
Republican	Earl L. 'Buddy' Carter (incumbent)	156,128	59.1
Democratic	Wade Herring	107,837	40.9
Total votes		263,965	100.0

Georgia's 1st congressional district General Election, 2024
Party	Candidate	Votes	%
Republican	Buddy Carter (incumbent)	220,576	61.98%
Democratic	Patti Hewitt	135,281	38.02%
Total votes		355,857	100%

Georgia's Senate Republican primary, 2026
Party	Candidate	Votes	%
Republican	Mike Collins	369,642	40.5
Republican	Derek Dooley	275,534	30.2
Republican	Buddy Carter	229,223	25.1
Republican	Jonathan McColumn	28,447	3.1
Republican	John F. Coyne III	9,850	1.1
Total votes		912,696	100.0

U.S. House of Representatives
Preceded by Jack Kingston	Member of the U.S. House of Representatives from Georgia's 1st congressional district 2015–present	Incumbent
U.S. order of precedence (ceremonial)
Preceded by Brendan Boyle	United States representatives by seniority 131st	Succeeded by Mark DeSaulnier
