= 2026 United States Senate election in Georgia =

- November 3, 2026
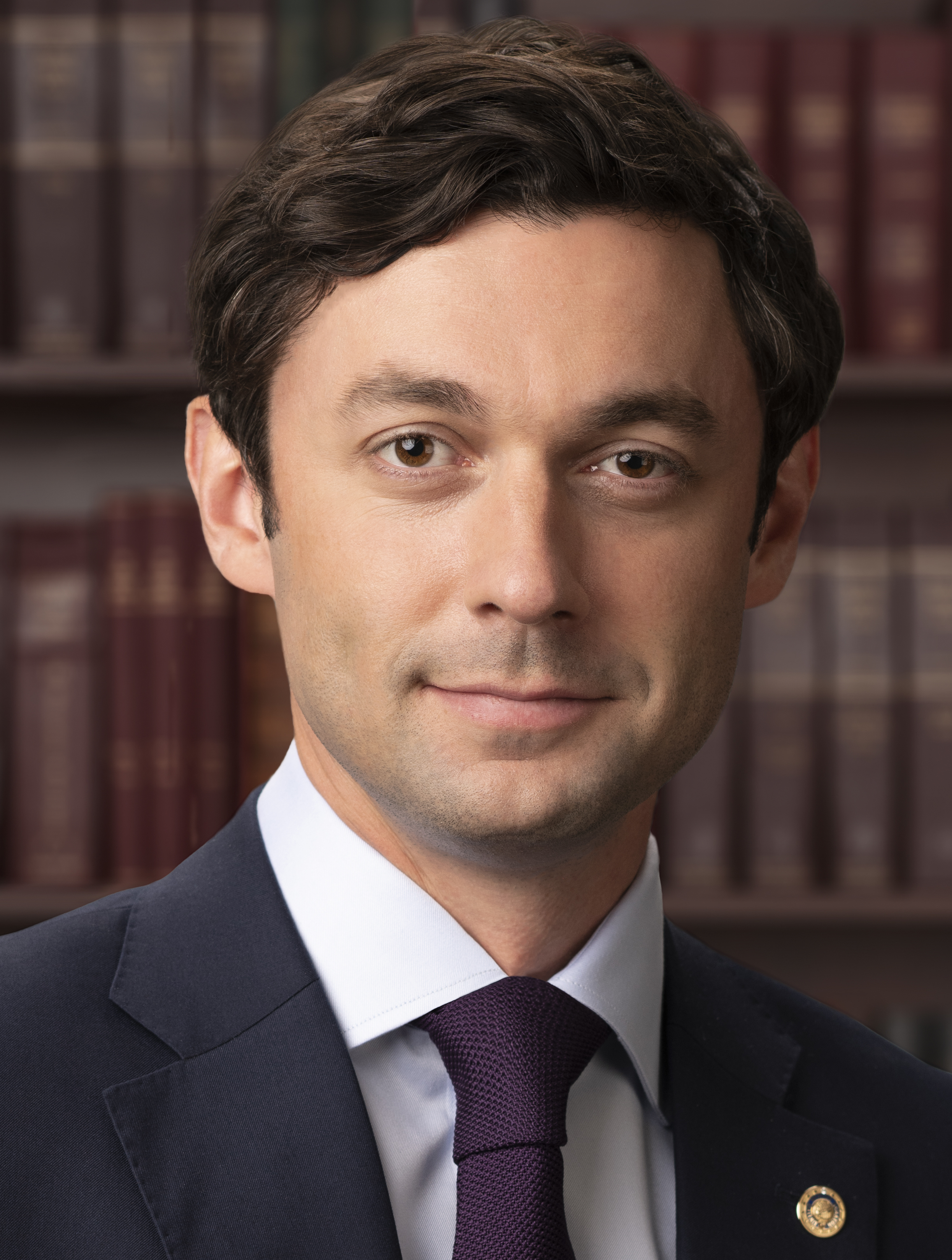

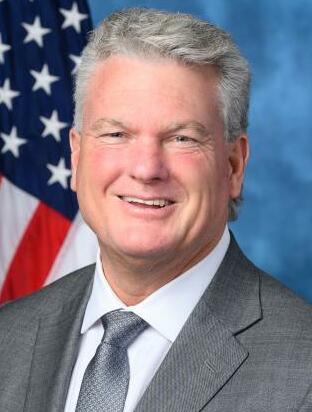
Nominee	Jon Ossoff	Mike Collins
Party	Democratic	Republican
Popular vote	2,469,059	1,713,673
Percentage	59.02%	40.96%
- Ossoff: 50–60% 60–70% 70–80% 80–90% >90% Collins: 50–60% 60–70% 70–80% 80–90% >90% Tie: 50% No data
U.S. senator before election
Jon Ossoff
Democratic
Elected U.S. senator
Jon Ossoff
Democratic

The 2026 United States Senate election in Georgia was held on November 3, 2026 to elect a member of the United States Senate to represent the state of Georgia. Democratic incumbent Jon Ossoff was elected to a second term in a landslide victory over Republican representative Mike Collins.

Primary elections were held on May 19, with Ossoff running unopposed for the Democratic nomination. No candidate obtained a majority in the first round of the Republican primary between Collins, former football coach Derek Dooley, and Representative Buddy Carter, leading to a runoff between Collins and Dooley on June 16. After receiving an endorsement from President Donald Trump, Collins was nominated with 55.5% of the vote.

This was one of two Democratic-held Senate seats in a state won by Trump in 2024, along with Michigan. As such, this race was initially expected to be competitive. However, Ossoff maintained a comfortable and consistent polling lead over Collins during the campaign, causing this seat to instead be anticipated as a safe hold for Democrats. This proved to be correct on election night, as Ossoff won by an 18% margin, vastly outperforming polling averages. With his victory, this is the first time since 2000 that Democrats won a Senate race in Georgia by double digits.

== Background ==
Georgia has been considered to be a purple or swing state at the federal level. It was a top battleground state in the 2020 and 2024 presidential elections.

Both parties have seen success in the state in recent years. The state backed Joe Biden by 0.24% and Donald Trump by 2.2%, respectively, in 2020 and 2024. Democrats hold both of Georgia's U.S. Senate seats. Republicans control all statewide executive offices, (Note: While Democrats did flip 2 seats in the 2025 Georgia Public Service Commission special election, Republicans still hold a 3–2 majority.) control both chambers of the legislature, and hold a majority in Georgia's U.S. House delegation.

== Democratic primary ==
=== Candidates ===
==== Nominee ====
- Jon Ossoff, incumbent U.S. senator (2021–present)

=== Endorsements ===
Jon Ossoff

U.S. senators

- Raphael Warnock, Georgia (2021–present)

Organizations

- Black Economic Alliance PAC
- Council for a Livable World
- Council on American-Islamic Relations
- End Citizens United
- Giffords
- Human Rights Campaign
- J Street
- Joint Action Committee for Political Affairs
- League of Conservation Voters
- National Committee to Preserve Social Security and Medicare
- Planned Parenthood
- Population Connection
- Reproductive Freedom for All
- Southern Poverty Law Center

=== Fundraising ===
Campaign finance reports as of March 31, 2026
Candidate	Raised	Spent	Cash on hand
Jon Ossoff (D)	$77,977,161	$50,572,862	$31,736,032
Source: Federal Election Commission

=== Results ===
Democratic primary results
Party	Candidate	Votes	%
Democratic	Jon Ossoff (incumbent)	1,042,331	100.0
Total votes		1,042,331	100.0

== Republican primary ==
=== Candidates ===
==== Nominee ====
- Mike Collins, U.S. representative from Georgia's 10th congressional district (2023–present)

==== Eliminated in runoff ====
- Derek Dooley, former Tennessee Volunteers football head coach

==== Eliminated in primary ====
- Buddy Carter, U.S. representative from Georgia's 1st congressional district (2015–present)
- John F. Coyne III, businessman
- Jonathan McColumn, former United States Army Reserve brigadier general, pastor and candidate for U.S. Senate in 2022

==== Withdrawn ====
- Reagan Box, horse trainer (ran for U.S. House)
- John King, Georgia insurance commissioner (2019–present) (running for re-election)

==== Declined ====
- Andrew Clyde, U.S. representative from Georgia's 9th congressional district (2021–present) (running for re-election)
- Marjorie Taylor Greene, former U.S. representative from Georgia's 14th congressional district (2021–2026)
- Brian Kemp, governor of Georgia (2019–present) (endorsed Dooley)
- Rich McCormick, U.S. representative from Georgia's 7th congressional district (2023–present)
- Colton Moore, state senator from the 53rd district (2023–present) (ran for U.S. House)
- Brad Raffensperger, Georgia secretary of state (2019–present) (ran for governor)

=== Endorsements ===
Mike Collins

Executive branch officials

- Donald Trump, president of the United States (2017–2021, 2025–present) (Note: Endorsement received after the first round of primary voting took place.)

U.S. representatives

- Max Burns, state senator from the 23rd district (2021–present) and former GA-12 (2003–2005)
- Tom Emmer, majority whip (2023–present) from MN-06 (2015–present)
- Brandon Gill, TX-26 (2025–present)
- Newt Gingrich, former speaker of the House (1995–1999) from GA-06 (1979–1999)
- Kevin Hern, OK-01 (2018–present)
- Brian Jack, GA-03 (2025–present)
- Burgess Owens, UT-04 (2021–present)
- Steve Scalise, majority leader (2023–present) from LA-01 (2008–present)
- Derrick Van Orden, WI-03 (2023–present)

State legislators

- 18 state legislators (Note: Jason Anavitarte, majority leader of the Georgia State Senate (2025–present) from the 31st district (2021–present); Lee Anderson, state senator from the 24th district (2017–present); James Burchett, state representative from the 176th district (2019–present); Beth Camp, state representative from the 135th district (2021–present); Clint Crowe, state representative from the 118th district (2021–present); Robert Dickey state representative from the 145th district (2011–present); Clint Dixon, state senator from the 45th district (2021–present); Matthew Gambill, state representative from the 15th district (2019–present); Russ Goodman, state senator from the 8th district (2021–present); Justin Howard, state representative from the 71st district (2025–present); Reynaldo Martinez, state representative from the 111th district (2023–present); Jason Ridley, state representative from the 6th district (2017–present); Shawn Still, state senator from the 48th district (2023–present); Carden Summers, state senator from the 13th district (2020–present); Brad Thomas, state representative from the 21st district (2021–present); Sam Watson, state senator from the 11th district (2023–present); Marcus Wiedower, state representative from the 121st district (2019–present); Rick Williams, state senator from the 25th district (2023–present))

Individuals

- Allyson Phillips, mother of Laken Riley

Labor unions

- National Border Patrol Council

Organizations

- AIPAC (co-endorsed with Carter)
- Club for Growth
- Conservative Political Action Conference
- New York Young Republican Club
- Republicans for National Renewal
- Turning Point Action
- Veterans for America First
Derek Dooley

Statewide officials

- Brian Kemp, governor of Georgia (2019–present)

Individuals

- Marty Kemp, first lady of Georgia (2019–present)
Buddy Carter (eliminated)

State legislators

- Eric Johnson, former SD-01 (1995–2009)

Organizations

- AIPAC (co-endorsed with Collins)
Brian Kemp (declined)

U.S. senators

- Tim Scott, South Carolina (2013–present)

U.S. representatives

- ~~Mike Collins, GA-10 (2023–present)~~ (entered race in July 2025)

Local officials

- Erick Erickson, conservative pundit and former Macon city councilor (2007–2011)

=== Fundraising ===
Italics indicate a candidate that has either withdrawn from the race, declined to run, or been eliminated in the primary.

Campaign finance reports as of March 31, 2026
Candidate	Raised	Spent	Cash on hand
Buddy Carter (R)	$6,713,652	$6,002,322	$3,730,260
Mike Collins (R)	$4,318,376	$2,790,134	$2,125,437
Derek Dooley (R)	$3,671,916	$1,448,348	$2,223,568
John King (R)	$563,078	$563,078	$0
Source: Federal Election Commission

=== Polling ===
Aggregate polls

Source of poll aggregation	Dates administered	Dates updated	Buddy Carter	Mike Collins	Derek Dooley	Other/Undecided (Note: Calculated by taking the difference of 100% and all other candidates combined.)	Margin
RealClearPolitics	April 18 – May 17, 2026	May 18, 2026	14.8%	29.5%	18.0%	37.7% (Note: Jonathan McColumn with 1.3; John Coyne with 0.7%%)	Collins +11.5%

Poll source	Date(s) administered	Sample size (Note: Key: A – all adults RV – registered voters LV – likely voters V – unclear)	Margin of error	Buddy Carter	Mike Collins	Derek Dooley	Other	Undecided
InsiderAdvantage (R)	May 16–17, 2026	800 (LV)	± 3.5%	21%	32%	26%	3% (Note: John McColumn 2%; John Coyne with 1%)	18%
Quantus Insights (R)	April 28 – May 2, 2026	1,677 (LV)	± 2.7%	14%	33%	23%	3%	27%
University of Georgia (Note: Poll sponsored by the The Atlanta Journal-Constitution)	April 18–26, 2026	1,000 (LV)	± 3.1%	13%	22%	11%	2% (Note: John Coyne & John McColumn with 1%)	54%
Cygnal (R) (Note: Poll sponsored by the Democracy Defense Project)	April 22–23, 2026	600 (LV)	± 4.0%	11%	30%	12%	2% (Note: John McColumn with 1%)	45%
InsiderAdvantage (R)	April 22–23, 2026	800 (LV)	± 3.46%	24%	27%	16%	4%	29%
JMC Analytics	March 7–8, 2026	560 (LV)	± 4.1%	11%	31%	13%	1% (Note: Jonathan McColumn with 1%; John Francis Coyne III with <1%)	43%
Emerson College (Note: Poll sponsored by Nexstar Media)	February 28 – March 2, 2026	453 (LV)	± 4.6%	16%	30%	10%	4% (Note: Jonathan McColumn and "Someone else" with 2%)	40%
Quantus Insights (R)	February 17–18, 2026	1,337 (LV)	± 3.0%	11%	36%	9%	—	44%
Rasmussen Reports (R)	February 11–12, 2026	1,022 (LV)	± 3.0%	19%	34%	11%	36%	
Plymouth Union Public Research (R)	January 13–15, 2026	600 (LV)	± 4.0%	16%	32%	12%	—	38%
InsiderAdvantage (R)	December 18–19, 2025	1,000 (LV)	± 3.1%	20%	25%	12%	5% (Note: Reagan Box with 5%)	38%
Quantus Insights (R)	October 22–23, 2025	1,320 (RV)	± 2.7%	16%	28%	16%	—	40%
Atlanta Journal-Constitution	October 15–23, 2025	—	—	20%	30%	12%	—	38%
Quantus Insights (R)	September 9–12, 2025	253 (RV)	—	20%	25%	7%	—	48%
TIPP Insights (Note: Poll sponsored by League of American Workers)	July 28 – August 1, 2025	1,123 (RV)	± 1.8%	19%	25%	7%	6%	43%

Hypothetical polling

Poll source	Date(s) administered	Sample size	Margin of error	Buddy Carter	Mike Collins	Marjorie Taylor Greene	John King	Rich McCormick	Brad Raffensberger	Other	Undecided
Trafalgar Group (R)	April 24–27, 2025	— (LV)	—	13%	15%	43%	2%	5%	22%	—	—
Trafalgar Group (R)	April 24–27, 2025	— (LV)	—	23%	46%	—	11%	21%	—	—	—
Advanced Targeting Research	March 25–26, 2025	726 (RV)	± 3.6%	3%	10%	—	1%	5%	10%	11% (Note: Tyler Harper with 1%; "Other candidate not listed above" with 10%)	60%

=== Results ===
Primary results by county: Collins: 30–40%; 40–50%; 50–60%; 60–70%; 70–80%; Dooley: 30–40%; 40–50%; Carter: 30–40%; 40–50%; 50–60%; 60–70%

Republican primary results
Party	Candidate	Votes	%
Republican	Mike Collins	369,642	40.5
Republican	Derek Dooley	275,534	30.2
Republican	Buddy Carter	229,223	25.1
Republican	Jonathan McColumn	28,447	3.1
Republican	John F. Coyne III	9,850	1.1
Total votes		912,696	100.0

=== Runoff ===
==== Polling ====
Poll source	Date(s) administered	Sample size	Margin of error	Mike Collins	Derek Dooley	Undecided
InsiderAdvantage (R)	June 15, 2026	800 (LV)	± 3.5%	50%	48%	2%
InsiderAdvantage (R)	June 13–14, 2026	800 (LV)	± 3.31%	48%	46%	6%
JMC Analytics (R)	May 26–27, 2026	600 (LV)	± 4.0%	55%	39%	6%
InsiderAdvantage (R)	May 20–21, 2026	800 (LV)	± 3.5%	46%	41%	13%
Quantus Insights (R)	May 20, 2026	782 (LV)	± 3.9%	54%	37%	9%
Quantus Insights (R)	October 22–23, 2025	1,320 (RV)	± 2.7%	42%	24%	34%

Hypothetical runoff polling

Buddy Carter vs. Derek Dooley

Poll source	Date(s) administered	Sample size	Margin of error	Buddy Carter	Derek Dooley	Undecided
Quantus Insights (R)	October 22–23, 2025	1,320 (RV)	± 2.7%	33%	28%	39%

Buddy Carter vs. Mike Collins

Poll source	Date(s) administered	Sample size	Margin of error	Buddy Carter	Mike Collins	Undecided
Quantus Insights (R)	October 22–23, 2025	1,320 (RV)	± 2.7%	23%	38%	39%

==== Results ====
Runoff results by county: Collins: 50–60%; 60–70%; 70–80%; 80–90%; Dooley: 50–60%; 60–70%

Republican primary runoff results
Party	Candidate	Votes	%
Republican	Mike Collins	390,174	55.5
Republican	Derek Dooley	312,339	44.5
Total votes		702,513	100.0

== General election ==
=== Predictions ===
Source	Ranking	As of
CBS News	Lean D	October 30, 2026
The Cook Political Report	Likely D	November 2, 2026
Decision Desk HQ	Likely D	November 3, 2026
The Economist (Note: The Economist's prediction model uses unconventional terminology. For the purpose of equivalency, their "Very Likely" ratings are formatted as a "Likely" rating while "Likely" ratings are formatted as a "Lean" rating.)	Likely D	November 3, 2026
FiftyPlusOne	Safe D	November 3, 2026
Fox News	Likely D	November 1, 2026
Inside Elections	Likely D	October 29, 2026
MS NOW	Lean D	October 29, 2026
NBC News	Likely D	November 3, 2026
RealClearPolitics	Likely D	November 2, 2026
Sabato's Crystal Ball	Likely D	November 2, 2026
Silver Bulletin	Solid D	November 3, 2026
Split Ticket	Safe D	November 2, 2026

=== Post-primary endorsements ===
Jon Ossoff (D)

Executive branch officials

- Jeff Flake, former ambassador to Turkey (2022–2024) and U.S. senator from Arizona (2013–2019) (Republican)
- Kamala Harris, former vice president of the United States (2021–2025)
- Keisha Lance Bottoms, former senior advisor to the president (2022–2023), mayor of Atlanta (2018–2022), and 2026 Georgia gubernatorial nominee
- Barack Obama, former president of the United States (2009–2017)

Statewide officials

- Wes Moore, governor of Maryland (2023–present)
- Mikie Sherrill, governor of New Jersey (2026–present)

State legislators

- James Talarico, Texas's HD-50 (2018–present) and Democratic nominee for U.S. Senate from Texas in 2026

Local officials

- Gail Fry, mayor of Toccoa (2014–present) (Republican)
- Scott Matheson, mayor of Valdosta (2020–present) (Republican)
- Julie Smith, mayor of Tifton (2016−present) (Republican)

Labor unions

- Actors' Equity Association
- National Education Association
- United Auto Workers
Mike Collins (R)

U.S. senators

- Rick Scott, Florida (2019–present)
- John Thune, Senate majority leader from South Dakota (2005–present)

U.S. representatives

- Rick Allen, GA-12 (2015–present)

Statewide officials

- Tyler Harper, agriculture commissioner of Georgia (2023–present)
- Burt Jones, lieutenant governor of Georgia (2023–present)
- Brian Kemp, governor of Georgia (2019–present)

State legislators

- Reynaldo Martinez, HD-111 (2023–present)

Party officials

- Joshua McKoon, chair of the Georgia Republican Party (2023–present)

Individuals

- Rick Jackson, CEO of Jackson Healthcare, 2026 Republican candidate for Georgia Governor
- CJ Pearson, conservative activist

Organizations

- National Republican Senatorial Committee
- NRA Political Victory Fund
- Senate Conservatives Fund
Declined to endorse

Statewide officials

- Brad Raffensperger, Georgia secretary of state (2019–present) (Republican)

=== Debates ===
2026 Georgia U.S. Senate election debates
No.	Date	Host	Moderator	Link	Democratic	Republican
Key: P Participant A Absent N Not invited I Invited W Withdrawn						
Key: P Participant A Absent N Not invited I Invited W Withdrawn					Ossoff	Collins
1	October 8, 2026	Atlanta News First; Gray Media	Rick Folbaum	YouTube	P	P

=== Fundraising ===
Campaign finance reports as of October 14, 2026
Candidate	Raised	Spent	Cash on hand
Jon Ossoff (D)	$136,610,982	$125,808,380	$15,134,336
Mike Collins (R)	$10,679,277	$10,178,766	$1,103,682
Source: Federal Election Commission

=== Polling ===
Aggregate polls

Source of poll aggregation	Dates administered	Dates updated	Jon Ossoff (D)	Mike Collins (R)	Other/Undecided (Note: Calculated by taking the difference of 100% and all other candidates combined.)	Margin
270toWin	October 6 – November 2, 2026	November 2, 2026	54.0%	44.4%	1.6%	Ossoff +9.6%
Decision Desk HQ	through November 2, 2026	November 2, 2026	53.1%	43.3%	3.6%	Ossoff +9.8%
FiftyPlusOne	through November 2, 2026	November 3, 2026	52.5%	42.9%	4.6%	Ossoff +9.6%
RealClearPolitics	September 15 – November 2, 2026	November 2, 2026	51.9%	43.3%	4.8%	Ossoff +8.6%
Silver Bulletin	through November 2, 2026	November 3, 2026	52.8%	43.4%	3.8%	Ossoff +9.4%
Average			52.9%	43.5%	3.6%	Ossoff +9.4%

Poll source	Date(s) administered	Sample size	Margin of error	Jon Ossoff (D)	Mike Collins (R)	Other	Undecided
Research Co.	October 31 – November 2, 2026	450 (LV)	± 4.6%	52%	42%	—	6%
InsiderAdvantage (R)	October 31 – November 2, 2026	2,500 (LV)	± 2.0%	53%	46%	—	1%
Echelon Insights (R) (Note: Poll conducted for NetChoice)	October 16–23, 2026	508 (LV)	± 5.2%	55%	40%	3% (Note: Allen Buckley (L) with 3%)	2%
ActiVote	October 6–20, 2026	400 (LV)	± 4.9%	54%	46%	—	—
Quantus Insights (R)	October 15–17, 2026	755 (LV)	± 3.8%	52%	45%	—	3%
Quantus Insights (R)	October 15–17, 2026	755 (LV)	± 3.8%	53% (Note: Leaners pushed)	45%	—	2%
Quantus Insights (R)	October 15–17, 2026	755 (LV)	± 3.8%	54% (Note: Two-way)	46%	—	—
University of Georgia (Note: Poll conducted for The Atlanta Journal-Constitution)	October 7–15, 2026	1,000 (LV)	± 3.1%	48%	40%	—	12%
Trafalgar Group (R)	October 7–9, 2026	1,101 (LV)	± 2.9%	51%	43%	—	6%
InsiderAdvantage (R)	September 22–23, 2026	1,200 (LV)	± 4.0%	50%	42%	—	8%
Big Data Poll (R) (Note: Poll sponsored by the Public Polling Project)	September 21–23, 2026	721 (RV)	± 4.0%	51%	40%	—	9%
Big Data Poll (R)	September 21–23, 2026	678 (LV)	± 4.0%	52%	41%	—	7%
Big Data Poll (R)	September 21–23, 2026	678 (LV)	± 4.0%	55% (Note: With voters who lean towards a given candidate)	45%	—	—
YouGov	September 15–18, 2026	3,416 (RV)	± 2.7%	51%	41%	2% (Note: "Someone else" & "I will not vote in this race" with 1%)	6%
YouGov	September 15–18, 2026	3,301 (LV) (Note: Loose likely voters.)	± 2.8%	52%	42%	2% (Note: "Someone else" & "I will not vote in this race" with 1%)	5%
YouGov	September 15–18, 2026	3,071 (LV) (Note: Strict likely voters.)	± 2.9%	51%	43%	1% (Note: "I will not vote in this race" with 1%)	5%
Quantus Insights (R)	September 14–16, 2026	645 (LV)	± 4.3%	48%	44%	1%	7%
Quantus Insights (R)	September 14–16, 2026	645 (LV)	± 4.3%	49% (Note: Leaners pushed)	45%	1%	5%
Rasmussen Reports (R)	September 14, 2026	1,019 (LV)	± 3.0%	51%	42%	—	6%
Trafalgar Group (R)	September 10–12, 2026	1,091 (LV)	± 2.9%	49%	43%	1% (Note: Allen Buckley with 1%)	7%
InsiderAdvantage (R)	August 16–17, 2026	800 (LV)	± 3.5%	50%	43%	—	7%
Fabrizio Ward (R)/Impact Research (D) (Note: Poll commissioned by AARP)	July 13–16, 2026	1,060 (LV)	± 3.0%	52%	43%	—	5%
Wick	June 27–30, 2026	1,175 (LV)	± 2.9%	47%	43%	—	10%
Beacon Research (D)/ Shaw & Co. Research (R) (Note: Poll conducted for Fox News)	June 23–27, 2026	1,002 (RV)	± 3.0%	56%	43%	—	1%
	June 16, 2026	Republican primary runoff					
	May 19, 2026	Primary elections					
Echelon Insights (R) (Note: Poll commissioned by NetChoice)	April 3–9, 2026	407 (LV)	± 6.5%	51%	44%	—	5%
Emerson College	February 28 – March 2, 2026	1,000 (LV)	± 3.0%	48%	43%	—	9%
Quantus Insights (R)	September 9–12, 2025	624 (RV)	± 4.3%	38%	38%	—	23%
TIPP Insights	July 28 – August 1, 2025	2,956 (RV)	± 1.8%	45%	44%	3%	8%
Cygnal (R)	May 15–17, 2025	800 (LV)	± 3.4%	46%	43%	—	11%
Trafalgar Group (R)	April 24–27, 2025	1,426 (LV)	± 2.9%	48%	43%	3%	6%
WPA Intelligence (R) (Note: Poll sponsored by Club for Growth)	January 14–15, 2025	500 (LV)	± 4.4%	44%	34%	—	22%

Hypothetical polling

Jon Ossoff vs. Derek Dooley

Aggregate polls

Source of poll aggregation	Dates administered	Dates updated	Jon Ossoff (D)	Derek Dooley (R)	Other/Undecided (Note: Calculated by taking the difference of 100% and all other candidates combined.)	Margin
RealClearPolitics	July 28, 2025 – March 2, 2026	March 5, 2026	45.0%	38.3%	16.7%	Ossoff +6.7%
	June 30, 2025 – March 5, 2026	March 5, 2026	48.4%	41.5%	10.1%	Ossoff +6.8%
Average			46.7%	39.9%	13.4%	Ossoff +6.75%

Poll source	Date(s) administered	Sample size	Margin of error	Jon Ossoff (D)	Derek Dooley (R)	Other	Undecided
Emerson College	February 28 – March 2, 2026	1,000 (LV)	± 3.0%	49%	41%	—	10%
Quantus Insights (R)	September 9–12, 2025	624 (RV)	± 4.3%	42%	35%	—	22%
TIPP Insights	July 28 – August 1, 2025	2,956 (RV)	± 1.8%	44%	39%	4%	14%
Cygnal (R)	June 16–18, 2025	610 (LV)	± 3.9%	50%	41%	—	9%

Jon Ossoff vs. Buddy Carter

Aggregate polls

Source of poll aggregation	Dates administered	Dates updated	Jon Ossoff (D)	Buddy Carter (R)	Other/Undecided (Note: Calculated by taking the difference of 100% and all other candidates combined.)	Margin
RealClearPolitics	May 15, 2025 – March 2, 2026	March 5, 2026	44.3%	40.8%	14.9%	Ossoff +3.5%
Race to the WH	January 16, 2025 – April 9, 2026	April 21, 2026	49.6%	43.8%	6.6%	Ossoff +5.8%
Average			47.0%	42.3%	10.8%	Ossoff +4.7%

Poll source	Date(s) administered	Sample size	Margin of error	Jon Ossoff (D)	Buddy Carter (R)	Other	Undecided
Echelon Insights (R)	April 3–9, 2026	407 (LV)	± 6.5%	52%	43%	—	5%
Emerson College	February 28 – March 2, 2026	1,000 (LV)	± 3.0%	47%	44%	—	9%
Quantus Insights (R)	September 9–12, 2025	624 (RV)	± 4.3%	40%	37%	—	22%
TIPP Insights	July 28 – August 1, 2025	2,956 (RV)	± 1.8%	44%	40%	3%	13%
Cygnal (R)	June 16–18, 2025	610 (LV)	± 3.9%	49%	42%	—	9%
Cygnal (R)	May 15–17, 2025	800 (LV)	± 3.4%	46%	42%	—	12%
Tyson Group (R)	January 30–31, 2025	600 (LV)	± 4.0%	47%	39%	—	13%
WPA Intelligence (R)	January 14–15, 2025	500 (LV)	± 4.4%	45%	32%	—	23%

Jon Ossoff vs. Brad Raffensperger

Poll source	Date(s) administered	Sample size	Margin of error	Jon Ossoff (D)	Brad Raffensperger (R)	Other	Undecided
Cygnal (R)	May 15–17, 2025	800 (LV)	± 3.4%	44%	44%	—	12%
Trafalgar Group (R)	April 24–27, 2025	1,426 (LV)	± 2.9%	46%	38%	10%	6%
Atlanta Journal-Constitution	April 15–24, 2025	1,000 (RV)	± 3.1%	48%	39%	—	3%
WPA Intelligence (R)	January 14–15, 2025	500 (LV)	± 4.4%	46%	32%	—	22%

Jon Ossoff vs. Brian Kemp

Poll source	Date(s) administered	Sample size	Margin of error	Jon Ossoff (D)	Brian Kemp (R)	Undecided
Atlanta Journal-Constitution	April 15–24, 2025	1,000 (RV)	± 3.1%	46%	49%	5%
Quantus Insights (R)	February 11–13, 2025	800 (RV)	± 3.5%	45%	48%	7%
Tyson Group (R)	January 30–31, 2025	600 (LV)	± 4.0%	42%	49%	8%
WPA Intelligence (R)	January 14–15, 2025	500 (LV)	± 4.4%	40%	46%	14%

Jon Ossoff vs. John King

Poll source	Date(s) administered	Sample size	Margin of error	Jon Ossoff (D)	John King (R)	Undecided
Cygnal (R)	June 16–18, 2025	610 (LV)	± 3.9%	50%	40%	10%
Cygnal (R)	May 15–17, 2025	800 (LV)	± 3.4%	45%	42%	13%
Atlanta Journal-Constitution	April 15–24, 2025	1,000 (RV)	± 3.1%	51%	38%	11%
WPA Intelligence (R)	January 14–15, 2025	500 (LV)	± 4.4%	47%	31%	22%

Jon Ossoff vs. Marjorie Taylor Greene

Poll source	Date(s) administered	Sample size	Margin of error	Jon Ossoff (D)	Marjorie Taylor Greene (R)	Other	Undecided
Trafalgar Group (R)	April 24–27, 2025	1,426 (LV)	± 2.9%	48%	37%	8%	7%
Atlanta Journal-Constitution	April 15–24, 2025	1,000 (RV)	± 3.1%	54%	37%	—	9%
Tyson Group (R)	January 30–31, 2025	600 (LV)	± 4.0%	51%	39%	—	9%

Jon Ossoff vs. Rich McCormick

Poll source	Date(s) administered	Sample size	Margin of error	Jon Ossoff (D)	Rich McCormick (R)	Undecided
WPA Intelligence (R)	January 14–15, 2025	500 (LV)	± 4.4%	44%	33%	23%

Jon Ossoff vs. Kelly Loeffler

Poll source	Date(s) administered	Sample size	Margin of error	Jon Ossoff (D)	Kelly Loeffler	Undecided
Cygnal (R)	May 15–17, 2025	800 (LV)	± 3.4%	46%	43%	11%

Jon Ossoff vs. Generic Republican

Poll source	Date(s) administered	Sample size	Margin of error	Jon Ossoff (D)	Generic Republican	Undecided
Cygnal (R)	March 9–10, 2025	600 (LV)	± 4.0%	44%	44%	16%

=== Results ===
2026 United States Senate election in Georgia
Party	Candidate	Votes	%	±%
Democratic	Jon Ossoff (incumbent)	2,469,059	59.02	+8.41
Republican	Mike Collins	1,713,673	40.96	−8.43
Write-in		631	0.02	N/A
Total votes		4,183,363	100.0	N/A
Democratic hold				

Counties that flipped from Republican to Democratic

- Burke (largest municipality: Waynesboro)
- Chattahoochee (largest municipality: Cusseta)
- Dooly (largest municipality: Unadilla)
- Fayette (largest municipality: Peachtree City)
- Houston (largest municipality: Warner Robins)
- Lowndes (largest municipality: Valdosta)
- Peach (largest municipality: Fort Valley)
- Spalding (largest municipality: Griffin)
- Twiggs (largest municipality: Jeffersonville)

==== By congressional district ====
Ossoff won seven congressional districts, including two that elected Republicans, while Collins won the other seven.

District	Ossoff	Collins	Elected Representative
1st	51.03%	48.97%	Jim Kingston
2nd	61.45%	38.55%	Sanford Bishop
3rd	44.53%	55.47%	Brian Jack
4th	84.54%	15.46%	Hank Johnson
5th	91.64%	8.36%	Nikema Williams
6th	82.24%	17.76%	Lucy McBath
7th	48.66%	51.34%	Rich McCormick
8th	43.46%	56.54%	Austin Scott
9th	44.01%	55.98%	Andrew Clyde
10th	49.66%	50.34%	Houston Gaines
11th	48.58%	51.42%	John Cowan
12th	51.33%	48.67%	Rick W. Allen
13th	81.66%	18.34%	Jasmine Clark
14th	43.35%	56.65%	Clay Fuller

== Analysis ==
The election was not close, with Ossoff defeating Collins by a decisive 18% margin. Most news organizations called the race for Ossoff within an hour of poll closings on election night. Ossoff's victory made him the first Democrat to be reelected to this seat since 1990, the first candidate of any party to win a US Senate election in Georgia by double digits and without a runoff since 2016, and the first Democrat to do so since 1984. Just like his previous election, the key to Ossoff's victory was building a massive electoral firewall in Metro Atlanta, which contains over half of Georgia's population, and whose suburbs have experienced a significant trend towards Democrats in recent election cycles.

Even still, the counties in this region produced historic margins for Ossoff. He solidified Democratic support in the core Atlanta counties of Fulton, DeKalb, and Clayton, scoring lopsided margins against Collins that well exceeded Kamala Harris's performance in these areas in 2024. Notably, he won the massive suburban counties of Cobb and Gwinnett with 67% and 71%, respectively, far surpassing the vote thresholds that were key to his narrow victory six years earlier. He was also able to win outer suburban Fayette and Spalding Counties, both of which voted for Donald Trump in 2024. Ultimately, Fulton, Gwinnett, Cobb, DeKalb, and Cherokee Counties saw a loss of between 35,000 and 77,000 GOP votes each; meanwhile, Democrats had smaller vote losses and even slightly gained in raw votes in Gwinnett and Cherokee. All of Georgia's 159 counties shifted towards Democrats, and Ossoff flipped a dozen of them.

=== Exit poll ===
2026 Georgia United States Senate election (CNN)
Demographic subgroup	Ossoff	Collins	% of total vote
Ideology
Liberals	98	2	22
Moderates	73	25	43
Conservatives	15	84	35
Party
Democrats	99	1	37
Republicans	8	91	34
Independents	66	32	30
Donald Trump job approval
Approve	7	92	38
Disapprove	90	9	61
2024 presidential vote
Kamala Harris	99	1	47
Donald Trump	13	86	45
Another candidate	72	17	1
Did not vote	88	11	6
Gender
Men	54	45	44
Women	62	37	55
Income
$100,000 or more	55	44	38
$50,000-$99,999	60	40	33
Less than $50,000	62	36	29
Race/ethnicity
White	40	59	60
Latino	66	32	5
Black	93	6	28
White born-again or evangelical Christian?
Yes	19	81	26
No	73	26	74
Race by gender
White men	36	63	28
White women	43	57	32
Black men	91	9	12
Black women	94	4	16
Latino men	65	35	2
Latina women	67	30	3
All other voters	70	29	8
Age
18–29 years old	85	13	12
30–44 years old	66	33	21
45–64 years old	55	44	37
65 and older	46	54	29
Area type
Urban	80	19	14
Suburban	67	32	50
Rural	39	61	36
Education
College graduate	65	34	46
No college degree	53	46	54
Education by race
White college graduates	52	47	29
Non-white college graduates	87	13	18
Whites without college	29	70	31
Non-whites without college	84	14	22
Education by gender and race
White women with college degrees	59	41	15
White women without college degrees	30	70	17
White men with college degrees	45	53	14
White men without college degrees	28	71	14
Voters of color	85	13	40
Educational attainment
Advanced degree	70	29	22
Bachelor's degree	61	38	24
Associate's degree	52	47	12
Some college	52	47	20
Never attended college	53	46	23

== Notes ==
Partisan clients
