= Mike Collins (politician) =

American politician (born 1967)

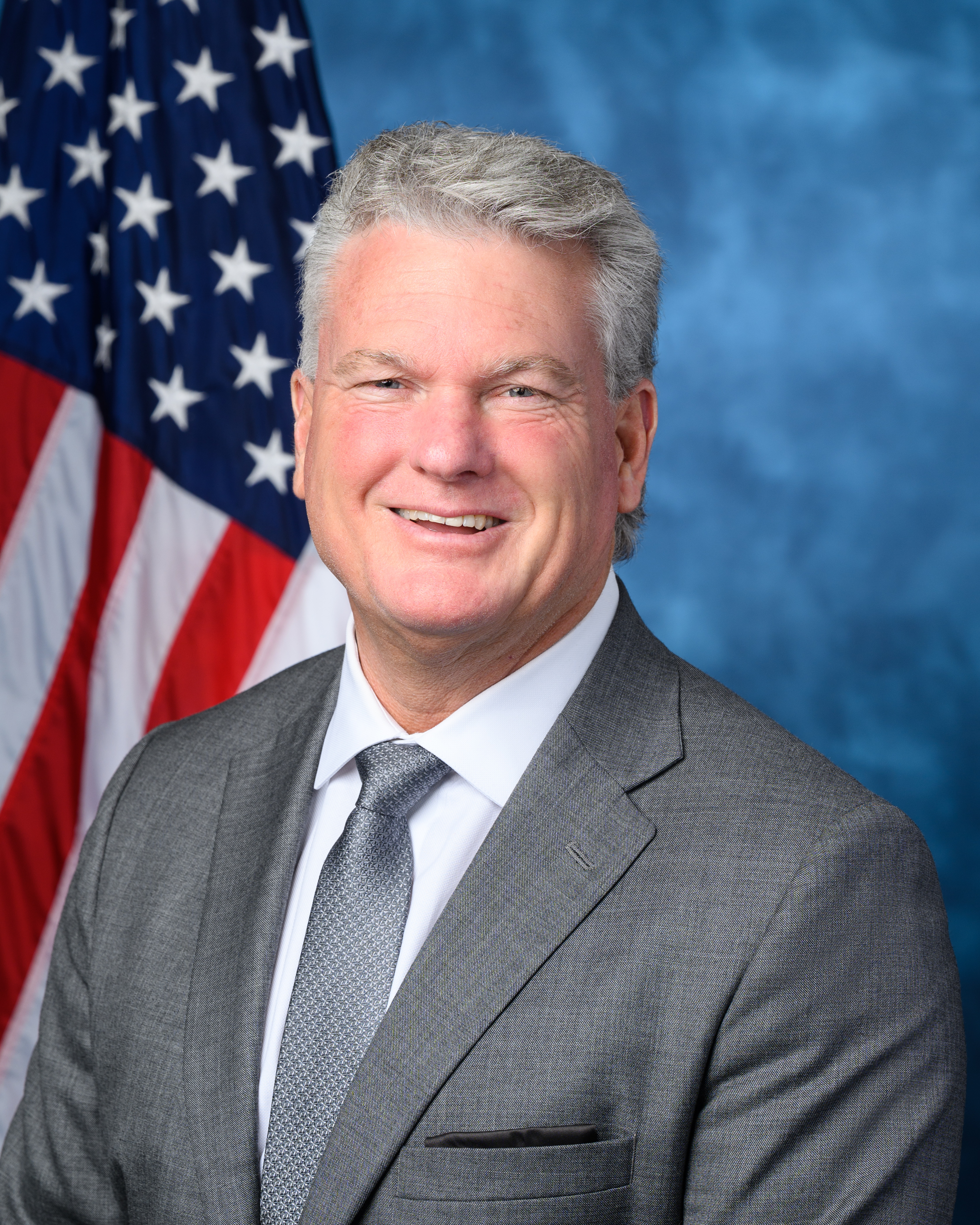
- Official portrait, 2023

Member of the U.S. House of Representatives from Georgia's 10th district
- Incumbent
- Assumed office January 3, 2023
- Preceded by: Jody Hice

Personal details
- Born: Michael Allen Collins Jr. July 2, 1967 (age 59) Jackson, Georgia, U.S.
- Party: Republican
- Spouse: Leigh Ann Collins
- Children: 3
- Relatives: Mac Collins (father)
- Education: Georgia State University (BA)
- Website: House website Campaign website
- Collins's voice Collins honoring Justice Clarence Thomas. Recorded February 7, 2023

Michael Allen Collins Jr. (born July 2, 1967) is an American politician and businessman serving as the U.S. representative for Georgia's 10th congressional district since 2023. He is a member of the Republican Party.

Born and raised in Jackson, Georgia, Collins graduated from Georgia State University in 1990 with a bachelor's degree in business administration. In the early 1990s, he and his wife, Leigh Ann, founded a trucking company. Collins was first elected to Congress in 2022. He was re-elected in 2024. He was the Republican nominee in the 2026 U.S. Senate election in Georgia, and lost to incumbent Democrat Jon Ossoff.

== Early life and career ==
Born in Jackson, Georgia, Collins attended Piedmont Academy in nearby Monticello, graduating in 1985. In 1990, he graduated from Georgia State University with a bachelor's degree in business. He has owned and operated several businesses, including a trucking company.

== U.S. House of Representatives ==
=== Elections ===
==== 2014 ====
Collins ran to represent Georgia's 10th congressional district in the United States House of Representatives in the 2014 elections, when incumbent Paul Broun was not seeking reelection. Collins finished in second place in the primary election to Jody Hice, advancing to a runoff election. Hice defeated Collins in the runoff.

==== 2022 ====
After Hice announced that he would not seek reelection in the 2022 elections, Collins announced his candidacy. During his campaign, Collins falsely claimed that Joe Biden had stolen the 2020 election. In a campaign ad, Collins, carrying a gun, told the camera, "You count the legal votes that were cast in the state of Georgia? Donald Trump won this state, period." He then shot a voting machine, which exploded. This campaign ad would be cited in discussions of Collins' stance on gun control following the 2024 Apalachee High School shooting that occurred in his congressional district.

Collins and Vernon Jones advanced to a runoff election, and Collins defeated Jones in the runoff on June 21. Collins defeated Tabitha Johnson-Green, the Democratic nominee, in the November general election with 64.5% of the vote.

==== 2024 ====
Collins ran unopposed in the 2024 Republican primary. He won the general election over the Democratic nominee, Lexy Doherty, with 63.1% of the vote.

=== Tenure ===
After his election, Collins' chief of staff, Brandon Phillips, was criticized on account of his criminal record. Kip Talley, Phillips' successor as Collins' chief of staff, was also criticized for being a member of a group chat consisting of white nationalists, in which Talley said he would use his government position to help free alt-right internet troll Charles C. Johnson from prison.

==== Impeachments ====
On December 13, 2023, Collins voted to formalize the impeachment inquiry into Joe Biden. Collins called for the impeachment and resignation of United States secretary of transportation Pete Buttigieg in 2023.

==== Budget ====
Collins was among 71 Republicans who voted against final passage of the Fiscal Responsibility Act of 2023 in the House. In December 2023, Collins used a music-themed Mariah Carey display on the floor of the House of Representatives titled "All I want for Christmas is 12 appropriations bills".

==== Counternarcotics ====
In December 2023, Collins's H.R. 1734 Testing, Rapid Analysis, and Narcotic Quality (TRANQ) Act passed both the House and the Senate and was sent to the President to be signed into law. The Atlanta Journal-Constitution reported that Collins was "in line to become the first member of this year's freshman class to see a bill signed into law."

==== Foreign policy ====
Collins was among 47 Republicans to vote in favor of 2023's H.Con.Res. 21 which directed President Joe Biden to remove U.S. troops from Syria within 180 days.

Collins voted to provide Israel with support following October 7 attacks. Collins supports the United States selling weapons to Taiwan, but voted against providing military aid to Ukraine during the Russian invasion of Ukraine.

==== Immigration ====
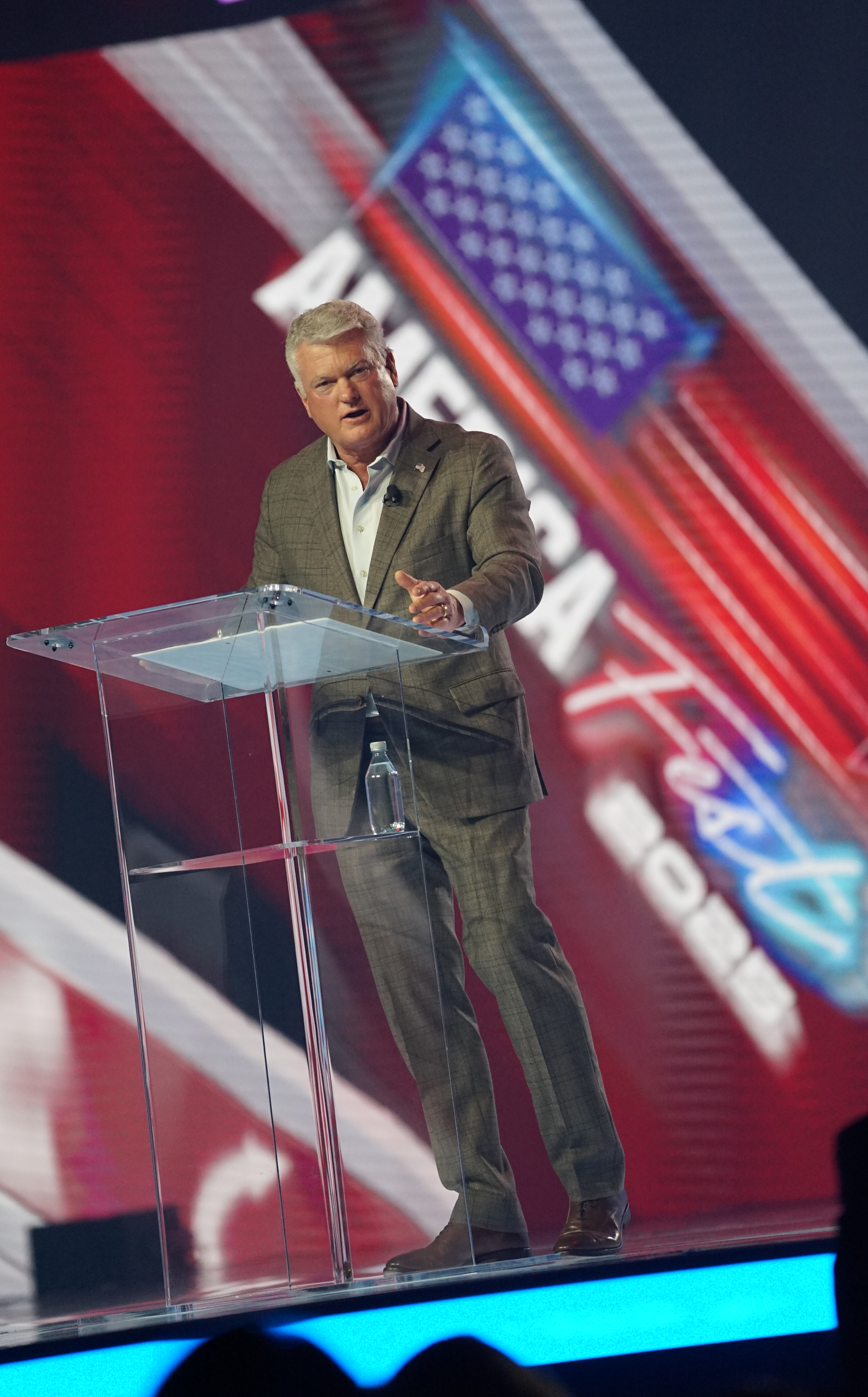
Collins at AmericaFest 2025

On January 24, 2024, Collins introduced a bill he called the "RAZOR Act" which would ban federal authorities from removing razor wire placed along the border with Mexico by the State of Texas and the Texas National Guard.

After a migrant in New York City was released from jail without bail in February 2024 after allegedly attacking a police officer; Collins suggested the migrant be executed. Collins stated on X that the migrant should be given "a ticket on Pinochet Air for a free helicopter ride back.” Collins's post referenced the Chilean government's killing of dissidents on death flights carried out during the rule of Augusto Pinochet. The migrant Collins had suggested be executed was later cleared of wrongdoing after the Manhattan district attorney's office announced he had been misidentified.

After the murder of Laken Riley, who was a Georgia resident, Collins introduced the Laken Riley Act, which requires U.S. Immigration and Customs Enforcement to detain undocumented immigrants charged with theft. The Laken Riley Act passed the House of Representatives during the 118th Congress. In January 2025, the Laken Riley Act was passed by both chambers of Congress and was signed into law by President Trump.

==== Abortion ====
During his initial congressional run in 2022, Collins told an anti-abortion group he supported banning abortions without any exceptions.

In January 2025, Collins co-sponsored fellow GOP House member Eric Burlison's bill recognizing personhood as starting at conception.

Collins has described himself as "100 percent pro-life, period. No exceptions." President Trump privately raised concerns in 2026 on Collins' hardline anti-abortion views, suggesting it could result in Collins losing in his election for the U.S. Senate.

==== Environment ====
Collins denies the existence of climate change, referring to it as "the climate hoax" in 2025. Collins warned of "fear-mongering climate zealots who want to ban gas stoves".

==== Ethics investigation ====
In November 2025, the House Ethics Committee announced that it was reviewing a complaint forwarded to it from the Office of Congressional Conduct regarding Collins and his chief of staff, Brandon Phillips. Phillips reportedly hired his girlfriend for an internship in Collins' office where she did little or no actual work.

=== Committee assignments ===
For the 119th Congress:

- Committee on Natural Resources
  - Subcommittee on Energy and Mineral Resources
  - Subcommittee on Oversight and Investigations
- Committee on Science, Space, and Technology
  - Subcommittee on Space and Aeronautics
- Committee on Transportation and Infrastructure
  - Subcommittee on Highways and Transit
  - Subcommittee on Water Resources and Environment (Chairman)

== U.S. Senate campaign ==
Mike Collins concedes the U.S. Senate race to opponent Jon Ossoff in a speech given to supporters on the evening of November 3, 2026.

Collins formally announced his candidacy for the U.S. Senate on July 27, 2025, challenging Democratic incumbent Jon Ossoff in his bid for re-election. In November 2025, the Collins campaign released a fake video, generated by artificial intelligence, that depicted an artificially-generated Ossoff defending his vote on the 2025 United States federal government shutdown by declaring he could never say no to Chuck Schumer and that SNAP recipients did not attend his out-of-state fundraisers. The Collins campaign also shared an AI-generated video featuring Collins as a shirtless blue jeans model, referencing an American Eagle Outfitters advertisement featuring Sydney Sweeney.

Collins led primary polling, and in May 2026 placed first in the Republican primary, advancing to a runoff against football coach Derek Dooley. In response to a post by political consultant Luke Thompson supporting Dooley, Collins' official social media account replied by referring to Thompson's wife Brooke Nevils as "Matt [Lauer's] sloppy seconds". Nevils had accused Matt Lauer of sexual assault. Collins subsequently apologized for the post and fired a staffer he said was responsible for sharing the post. Brandon Phillips was reportedly the aide responsible.

In July 2026, during his U.S. Senate campaign, Collins faced scrutiny following a CNN report detailing his familial ties to his son-in-law, David Alan Scheer the Second, a social media influencer known for promoting white nationalist ideology, Nazi imagery, and antisemitic conspiracy theories. The report noted that Scheer, who is married to Collins's daughter Summer, lived on a Georgia property owned by Collins, attended Collins's primary election-night victory party, and appeared to have produced promotional work for Collins's trucking company. In response to the controversy, a campaign spokesperson stated that Collins's lifelong support for Israel was unquestionable and backed by his consistent voting record in Congress.

In August 2026, The Washington Post reported that a former intern and fundraising consultant for Collins had shared Nazi and Ku Klux Klan imagery on social media. The Post reported that several Georgia Republicans expressed concerns over Collins's ties to several staffers who shared white supremacist and antisemitic content on social media.

On November 3, 2026, just under an hour after the polls closed in Georgia, the Associated Press called the U.S. Senate Race for incumbent Democrat senator Jon Ossoff, who won the election by a significant margin. Later that evening, Collins took the stage at his campaign headquarters to concede the race, thanking his supporters and pledging to continue serving his constituents.

== Social media ==
Collins frequently posts memes on social media, jokingly declaring that "Press Releases are out, memes are in." In March 2024, Collins replied "Never was a second thought" to an antisemitic post on X by user "Garbage Human", who was implicitly disparaging Washington Post journalist Maura Judkis for being Jewish. "Garbage Human" later confirmed they were alluding to Judkis's religion. Esther Panitch, the only Jewish member of the Georgia State Legislature, criticized Collins, saying "It's one thing to mistakenly respond to an anti-Semitic account. It's another thing to double down on it and gaslight us like it never happened." Collins denied his post on X was antisemitic, stating he had called Judkis a "garbage human" because she had said the United States was "built on stolen land".

In April 2024, amidst the ongoing pro-Palestinian protests on university campuses, Collins tweeted, "Not sure what y'all are doing up north, but we don't give them the time to encamp. Tazers set to stun!" Collins's post on X/Twitter was accompanied by a one-minute-17-second video clip depicting a series of scenes from the police crackdown on protesters at Emory University in Atlanta, Georgia, including a scene in which a Black man is seen lying on the ground in handcuffs while a Georgia State Patrol officer applies a taser to his leg and fires it. Other scenes in the video showed police struggling with protesters, protesters in handcuffs seated near an Atlanta Police prisoner transport van, and footage where the sound of police firing rubber bullets can be heard. In May 2024, Collins approvingly shared footage of counter-protesters at the University of Mississippi heckling pro-Palestinian protesters. Collins praised the counter-protesters, posting "Ole Miss taking care of business." The footage showed a white student engaging in racist mockery of a pro-Palestinian black student by imitating a monkey. The video also showed the counter-protesters chanting "Lock her up!" at the pro-Palestinian student.

In July 2024, after Donald Trump was injured in an assassination attempt at a rally in Butler, Pennsylvania, Collins stated on his X account, without evidence, that Trump's 2024 United States presidential election opponent Joe Biden "sent the orders" for the shooting and that Butler County's district attorney "should immediately file charges against [Biden] for inciting an assassination."

On the fourth anniversary of the January 6 United States Capitol attack, Collins posted that "On #ThisDayInHistory in 2021, thousands of peaceful grandmothers gathered in Washington, D.C., to take a self-guided, albeit unauthorized, tour of the U.S. Capitol building." Collins further referred to January 6 participants as "peaceful protestors" who were "hunted down, arrested, held in solitary confinement and treated unjustly".

In January 2025, Collins posted on X that Bishop Mariann Edgar Budde should be deported after the US-born Episcopal prelate delivered a homily at the post-inaugural interfaith prayer service at National Cathedral calling for newly inaugurated President Trump, who was present at the service, to show mercy to immigrants and LGBTQ children.

In May 2025, Collins said the closure of a Steak 'n Shake in the congressional food court and the opening of a halal restaurant was the "equivalent to the Muslim conquest of Jerusalem in the 7th century". Later that month, Collins posted a scene from the film Blood Diamond referencing the defunct white supremacist state of Rhodesia on X. The magazine Mother Jones wrote that the "post might have gone over the heads of most of Collins’ constituents. But the implications were obvious to plenty on the online right." Right-wing commentators replied, interpreting Collins' post as supportive of Rhodesia.

== Personal life ==
Collins's father, Mac Collins, also served in the House of Representatives, representing Georgia's 3rd congressional district from 1993 to 2005.

Collins and his wife, Leigh Ann, have three children. Collins is a Methodist.

U.S. House of Representatives
Preceded by Jody Hice	Member of the U.S. House of Representatives from Georgia's 10th congressional district 2023–present	Incumbent
Party political offices
Preceded by David Perdue	Republican nominee for U.S. Senator from Georgia (Class 2); 2026	Most recent
U.S. order of precedence (ceremonial)
Preceded by Juan Ciscomani	United States representatives by seniority 299th	Succeeded by Eli Crane
