= Derek Dooley (American football) =

American football player and coach (born 1968)

- Dooley with the Tennessee Volunteers in 2010

Personal information
- Born: June 10, 1968 (age 58); Athens, Georgia, U.S.

Career information
- High school: Clarke Central (Athens)
- College: Virginia (1987–1990)
- University: University of Virginia (BA); University of Georgia (JD)
- NFL draft: 1991: undrafted

Career history

Coaching
- Georgia (1996) Graduate assistant; SMU (1997–1999) Wide receivers coach; LSU (2000–2002) Tight ends coach; LSU (2003–2004) Assistant head coach and running backs coach; Miami Dolphins (2005–2006) Tight ends coach; Louisiana Tech (2007–2009) Head coach; Tennessee (2010–2012) Head coach; Dallas Cowboys (2013–2017) Wide receivers coach; Missouri (2018–2019) Offensive coordinator and quarterbacks coach; New York Giants (2020) Senior offensive assistant; New York Giants (2021) Tight ends coach; Alabama (2022–2023) Senior offensive analyst

Operations
- Louisiana Tech (2008–2010) Athletic director

Awards and highlights
- BCS national champion (2003)

Head coaching record
- Regular season: NCAA: 31–40 (.437)
- Postseason: NCAA Bowls: 1–1 (.500)
- Career: NCAA: 32–41 (.438)

Derek Vincent Dooley (born June 10, 1968) is an American football coach, attorney, and former college football player. Dooley most recently served as a senior offensive analyst for the Alabama Crimson Tide. He served as the head football coach at Louisiana Tech University from 2007 to 2009 and the University of Tennessee from 2010 to 2012.

A member of the Republican Party, Dooley announced in 2025 that he was running for the United States Senate in 2026, a seat held by Democratic Senator Jon Ossoff. He lost the Republican primary runoff to U.S. Representative Mike Collins.

== Early life ==
Dooley was born in Athens, Georgia, in 1968, the son of University of Georgia coach Vince Dooley and his wife, radio talk show host Barbara Meshad Dooley. Dooley played high school football at Clarke Central High School in Athens under coach Billy Henderson. He was a star tight end on the school's 1985 AAAA State Championship team. Dooley played alongside other notable Clarke Central (and later NFL) players, including kicker John Kasay (Seattle Seahawks, Carolina Panthers, New Orleans Saints), defensive end and former University of Tennessee defensive line coach Chuck Smith (Atlanta Falcons, Carolina) and wide receiver Willie Green (Detroit Lions, Tampa Bay Buccaneers, Carolina Panthers, Denver Broncos).

Dooley was a walk-on wide receiver at the University of Virginia. He earned a scholarship with the Cavaliers following his second season and helped the school to three bowl appearances, including an ACC championship in 1989. In 1990, he was named first-team Academic All-ACC and participated in the Senior Bowl. He graduated in 1990 with a bachelor's degree in government and foreign affairs, and went on to earn his Juris Doctor (J.D.) degree from the University of Georgia School of Law in 1994.

== College coaching career ==
=== Georgia ===
Dooley started his college coaching career with a one-year stint as a graduate assistant at the University of Georgia in 1996. This is where his father Vince Dooley was the athletic director and head football coach who won the 1980 national championship there.

=== SMU ===
Dooley spent the 1997–1999 seasons as the wide receivers coach at Southern Methodist University, while also holding the duties of assistant recruiting coordinator during his final two years at SMU.

=== LSU ===
In 2000, Dooley was hired by Nick Saban at LSU as the Tigers' recruiting coordinator/tight ends coach, a capacity in which he served until 2002. Dooley spent the 2003–04 seasons coaching the Tigers' running backs and special teams, and in 2004 was named assistant head coach. In 2005, Dooley left LSU with Saban when the latter became head coach of the Miami Dolphins.

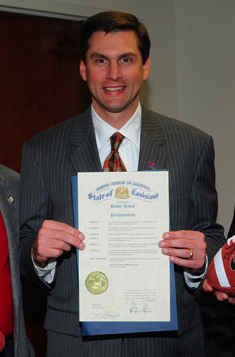
Dooley with Louisiana Tech in 2008.

=== Louisiana Tech ===
On December 17, 2006, Dooley was hired as the new head coach at Louisiana Tech University. He replaced former coach Jack Bicknell, who was fired on December 4 after the Bulldogs finished 3–10 in 2006.

In his first season as head coach, Dooley led the Bulldogs to a 5–7 record in 2007. On March 6, 2008, Dooley was named the Athletics Director of Louisiana Tech University replacing former AD Jim Oakes. From 2008 to 2009 Dooley was the only head football coach in the country who also served as the university's athletics director. In the 2008 season, Dooley led Louisiana Tech to a 7–5 regular season record. He led Louisiana Tech to its first postseason victory since the 1977 Independence Bowl with a 17–10 victory over Northern Illinois in the 2008 Independence Bowl. In the 2009 season, Dooley led Louisiana Tech to a 4–8 record.

=== Tennessee ===
On January 15, 2010, Dooley was hired as the 22nd head coach at the University of Tennessee. He replaced Lane Kiffin, who resigned to become head coach at the University of Southern California after one season at Tennessee. Dooley had a challenging three seasons as the head coach at Tennessee. The only in-depth on the record discussion of his tenure was given nearly four years later during a live two-hour televised interview with Clay Travis of Fox Sports Outkick the Coverage in June 2016.

Dooley inherited a program for which he would be the third head coach in three years. Perhaps due to these coaching changes, a number of scholarship players had left the University. The 2010 Tennessee Volunteer football team was expected to be one of the worst in school history. Despite few scholarship players and a very young team, the season yielded some positive, memorable, and controversial moments. On October 2, against #12 LSU, Tennessee was up 14–10 towards the end of the game. LSU was driving with little time remaining. LSU let the time run out in regulation before having a chance to score leaving Tennessee to think they won the game. Tennessee ended up having too many men on the field for that play. LSU got one more play after it had looked like the game had ended and scored the game-winning touchdown. Tennessee started the season 2–6. However, they won their last four regular season games to finish the season 6–6 and become bowl eligible. Tennessee went on to lose the Music City Bowl to North Carolina in a controversial ending.

In 2011, the team finished a disappointing 5–7, dropping the last game of the season to Kentucky, which ended a 26-game winning streak against the Wildcats. Combined with the 6–7 record of 2010, it was the first time since 1910–1911, that the Vols had finished with losing records in back to back seasons.

At the outset of the 2012 season the Vols had high hopes for a major turnaround. With returning star quarterback Tyler Bray back at the helm and star wide receiver Justin Hunter returning from injury the Vols were expected to tout an offense that could compete against the top SEC defenses. Boosting the offense from the start of the season was the emergence of community college transfer wide receiver Cordarrelle Patterson who became a big threat in both receiving and returning plays. However, another loss to the rival Florida Gators, a game in which the Vols were in control for a majority of time, sent the season trending downward. The Vols lost six of the nine remaining games, including a four-game losing streak which saw the Volunteers lose close games to ranked opponents Georgia and South Carolina. A heartbreaking 4 OT loss to Missouri left many fans fed up with Dooley after a questionable call to play overtime rather than play for a game-winning field goal would deprive the Vols of a victory. A lop-sided 41–18 loss to in-state rival Vanderbilt ended up being his final game. The next day, Dooley was fired from his head coaching position effective immediately. He was eventually replaced by Butch Jones, the former head coach of the Cincinnati Bearcats. The Volunteer football team went 5–7, with all seven losses being to SEC teams. As a result, Tennessee recorded three consecutive losing seasons (2010, 2011 and 2012). Dooley amassed the worst record of head coaches with more than two seasons in Tennessee history, and the worst overall since 1906. He has the worst record of all Tennessee coaches in SEC play.

=== Missouri ===
After a few years back in the NFL, Dooley returned to college, from 2018 until 2019 Dooley was the offensive coordinator and quarterbacks coach at the University of Missouri. In his first season as offensive coordinator, Mizzou ended the 2018 season ranked 13th nationally (third in the SEC) in total offense (481.8 avg.), 18th nationally (third in the SEC) in scoring (36.6 avg.) and 18th nationally (third in the SEC) in third down conversions (46.4%). Dooley's offense also led the SEC in fewest quarterback sacks allowed (8th nationally) and fewest tackles for loss allowed (6th nationally).

Under Dooley's guidance, Mizzou was one of only three Power Five offenses to throw for at least 279 yards per game, while rushing for at least 200 yards per game. The other two were national champion Clemson (279 passing/248 rushing) and CFP semi-finalist Oklahoma (322 passing/247 rushing).

In the 2018 AutoZone Liberty Bowl, Dooley's offense broke a school bowl-game record with 637 yards of total offense. In the game, Mizzou threw for 373 yards (including a program bowl-game record three passing touchdowns) while running for 264 more in the 38–33 loss to Oklahoma State.

Dooley mentored quarterback Drew Lock, who was drafted by the Denver Broncos in the second round of the 2019 NFL draft. Under Dooley's guidance, Lock was a finalist for three major national awards (Manning Award, Unitas Golden Arm Award, Lowe's Senior CLASS Award) and earned second-team All-SEC honors for his outstanding play, which included 3,498 yards and 28 passing touchdowns, to go with a career-best six rushing scores.

Dooley left after the 2019 season to return to the NFL.

=== Alabama ===
On February 16, 2022, Dooley was hired by Alabama to be their offensive analyst.

== NFL coaching career ==
=== Miami Dolphins ===
Dooley was named to the Dolphins' coaching staff as the tight ends coach on January 10, 2005, by Nick Saban, for whom Dooley had previously worked at Louisiana State University. Dooley served on the staff for two years, but left the Dolphins' staff in 2006 when he was chosen as the new head football coach at Louisiana Tech. He was an assistant coach under Nick Saban for seven years, which included a BCS National Championship at LSU in 2003.

=== Dallas Cowboys ===
On February 5, 2013, the Dallas Cowboys officially hired Dooley as their wide receivers coach. Dooley coached with the Cowboys from 2013–2017. During three of Dooley's five seasons with the team, he contributed to an offensive coaching staff that finished fifth in the NFL in points three times, in 2013, 2014, and 2016. In the 2014 and 2016 seasons, the team finished in the top seven offenses in yardage. During Dooley's tenure with the team, accomplished Cowboys wide receiver Dez Bryant earned three trips to the Pro Bowl in 2013, 2014, and 2016 and was named as a first team All Pro for the 2014 season. Following the 2017 season, he left the Cowboys to join the Missouri Tigers coaching staff.

=== New York Giants ===
On January 27, 2020, it was confirmed that Dooley would be a part of the Giants coaching staff under Joe Judge. For the 2021 season he was named as the team's tight ends coach, switching positions with Freddie Kitchens. He was not retained after the 2021 season.

== Political career ==
On August 4, 2025, Dooley announced that he would run in the 2026 United States Senate election in Georgia as a member of the Republican Party. He was endorsed by Governor Brian Kemp. Dooley lost to Mike Collins in a runoff in June 2026.

== Personal life ==
Dooley's wife is Dr. Allison Jeffers Dooley, who is an OB/GYN, and they have three children.

Before embarking on his coaching career, Dooley practiced law at Nelson Mullins Riley & Scarborough in Atlanta, Georgia. He is the son of former University of Georgia head football coach and athletic director Vince Dooley.

While at Tennessee, Dooley helped raise over $1 million for children and other causes in the local community. The Dooleys hosted the Big Orange Experience, an annual fundraising event for Variety, an organization that provides financial support for numerous children's charities. In 2012, some of the proceeds funded the Dooley-Witten Learning Center at the Halls/Powell Boys and Girls Club of the Tennessee Valley, a project on which Dooley teamed up with former Vol and Dallas Cowboys All-Pro Tight End Jason Witten.

Dooley's brother-in-law is former NFL wide receiver Patrick Jeffers.

== Head coaching record ==
Year	Team	Overall	Conference	Standing	Bowl/playoffs
Louisiana Tech Bulldogs (Western Athletic Conference) (2007–2009)
2007	Louisiana Tech	5–7	4–4	T–4th	
2008	Louisiana Tech	8–5	5–3	T–2nd	W Independence
2009	Louisiana Tech	4–8	3–5	T–5th	
Louisiana Tech:		17–20	12–12		
Tennessee Volunteers (Southeastern Conference) (2010–2012)
2010	Tennessee	6–7	3–5	T–3rd (Eastern)	L Music City
2011	Tennessee	5–7	1–7	6th (Eastern)	
2012	Tennessee	4–7*	0–7	6th (Eastern)	
Tennessee:		15–22	4–19	* Did not coach 12th game (fired)	
Total:		32–41			
