= Maura Judkis =

American journalist and writer

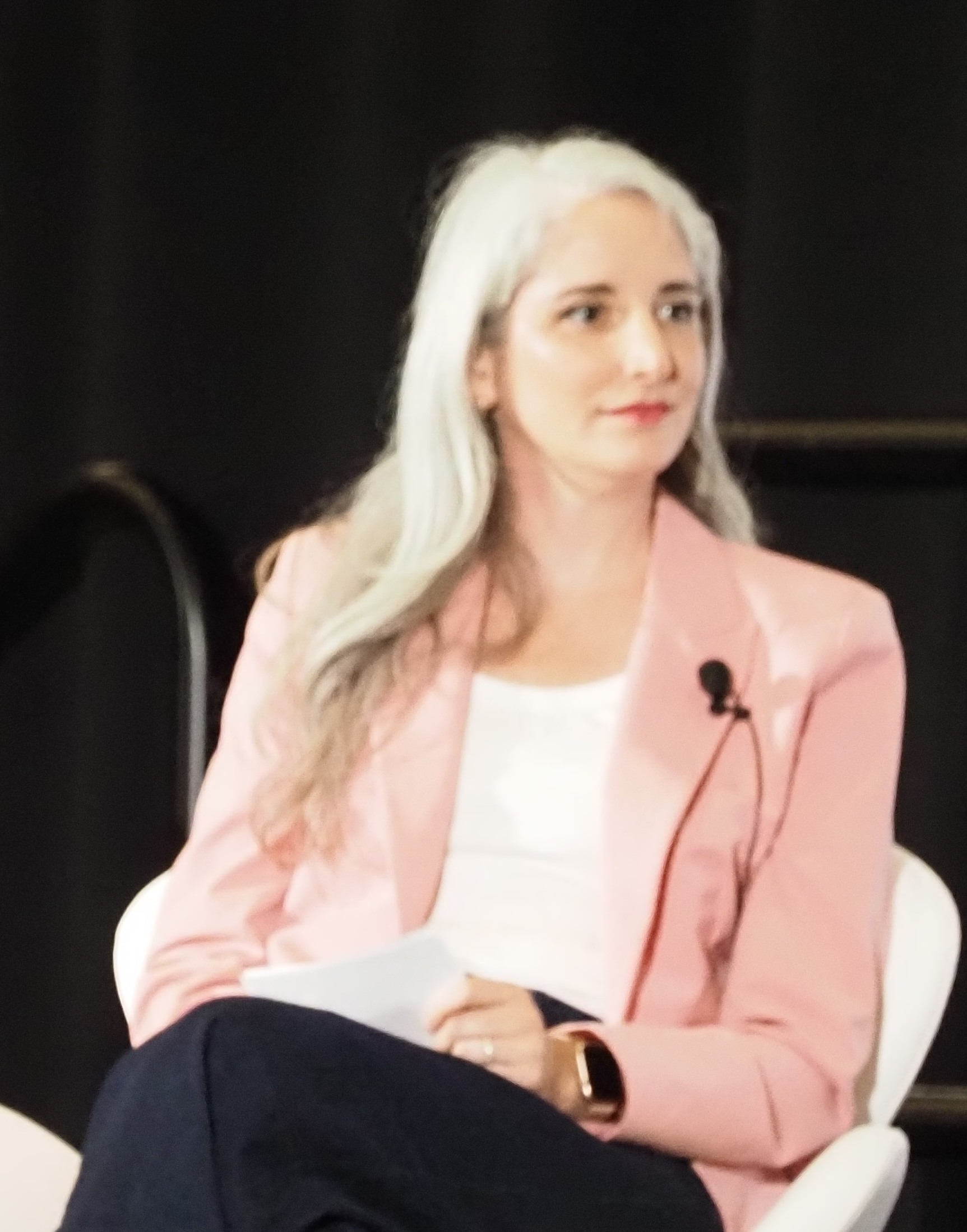
- Born: Maura Louise Judkis; 1984 or 1985 (age 40–41)
- Education: George Washington University
- Occupations: Journalist, essayist, writer
- Notable credit(s): "Doritos is Developing Lady-Friendly Chips Because You Should Never Hear a Woman Crunch" "Pumpkin Spice Life"
- Spouse: Scott Allen Gilmore

Maura Louise Judkis is an American journalist and writer. She has received recognition as a humorist, essayist, food taster, and video presenter. Since 2011, she has written for the Washington Post and is a general assignment reporter for the paper's style section.

== Early life and education ==
Judkis grew up in Pittsburgh, Pennsylvania. Her father, Jim Judkis, is a freelance photographer and her mother is an art professor. In 2007, she graduated from George Washington University with a degree in journalism and a minor in art history. While in college, she wrote for the University's paper The GW Hatchet, reviewing museums and concerts and providing cultural commentary.

== Career ==
After college, Judkis worked for U.S. News & World Report and the since closed publication, TBD.com. Other bylines also included pieces for the Washington City Paper and the Huffington Post. She sought to cover a range of topics and fields as a way to diversity her skills and earning new assignments. While an art, theater and culture reporter for TBD.com she completed an arts journalism fellowship with the National Endowment for the Arts and the University of Southern California.

Judkis joined the staff of the Washington Post in 2011 as a style section producer. Her goal was to cover art and culture in the city. Her initial focus with on visual arts, which she has linked to her parents' work as artists.

Judkis next worked as a reporter in the Weekend section, and joined the food section in 2014. Her coverage included articles about harassment in the food industry, for which she received and dismissed criticism that food writers should only write about food. She has reviewed food documentaries, chronicled the life of figures in the DC food scene, and the arc of food institutions. In 2018, Judkis launched a series, Is it Good?, in which she tastes various new foods and tests food products. The feature was released on YouTube, Snapchat, and Amazon.

In 2019, it was announced that Judkis was moving within the paper, leaving the food section to become a general assignment reporter for the style section.

=== Recognition ===
Judkis won the James Beard Foundation award in 2017 for humor. She was nominated for her article that described the history, nuances, and cultural significance of pumpkin spice, for which she collected and sampled more than 40 products featuring the distinctive fall flavor. She was again nominated in 2019, for an earlier essay, "Doritos is Developing Lady-Friendly Chips Because You Should Never Hear a Woman Crunch", about Doritos' efforts to make their product more appealing to women.

== Personal life ==
In 2013, Judkis married Scott Gilmore, a lawyer. They have two adopted dogs - Milky, a white Coton de Tulear mix, and Milou. The dogs have received consultations from a specialist for their problematic behavior, an experience Judkis compared to therapy. During the COVID-19 pandemic Judkis allowed her hair to go grey, a decision made by other women, and a change she embraced.
