= D. Ray James Correctional Institution =

Prison in Charlton County, Georgia

Coordinates: 30°52′18″N 81°58′54″W

- Interactive map of D. Ray James Correctional Institution
- Location: 3262 GA-252 Folkston, Georgia
- Status: open
- Security class: medium
- Capacity: 2847
- Opened: 1998
- Managed by: GEO Group

D. Ray James Correctional Institution is a private prison located in Folkston, Charlton County, Georgia, owned and operated by the GEO Group under contract with the Federal Bureau of Prisons and the U.S. Marshals Service.

The facility first opened in 1998 for Georgia state inmates. In 2010, after an expansion, the 1800 existing Georgia inmates were moved to other state prisons, replaced with as many as 2507 federal immigration detainees.

In August 2016, Justice Department officials announced that the FBOP would be phasing out its use of contracted facilities, on the grounds that private prisons provided less safe and less effective services with no substantial cost savings. The agency expects to allow current contracts on its thirteen remaining private facilities to expire. D. Ray James is one of those facilities.

Canadian activist Marc Emery was held at D. Ray James in 2010/2011 as a "deportable alien".

== 2025 Expansion ==
In 2025, as a part of the Trump administration's immigration enforcement actions, the prison is designated for expansion. The new Folkston ICE Processing Center will receive almost 50 million dollars in expansions to detain more than 3000 prisoners. The construction sparked local protests as immigration facilities around the country have been tied to human rights abuses. The facility has already faced scrutiny from the Department of Homeland Security Inspector General for failing to maintain adequate facility standards in 2022. The inspector found that the facility was infested with mold, insects, and debris, in addition to failing to provide hot meals and timely medical care.
