= List of mayors of Valdosta, Georgia =

Mayors of the city of Valdosta, Georgia, USA

The following is a list of mayors of the city of Valdosta, Georgia, United States.

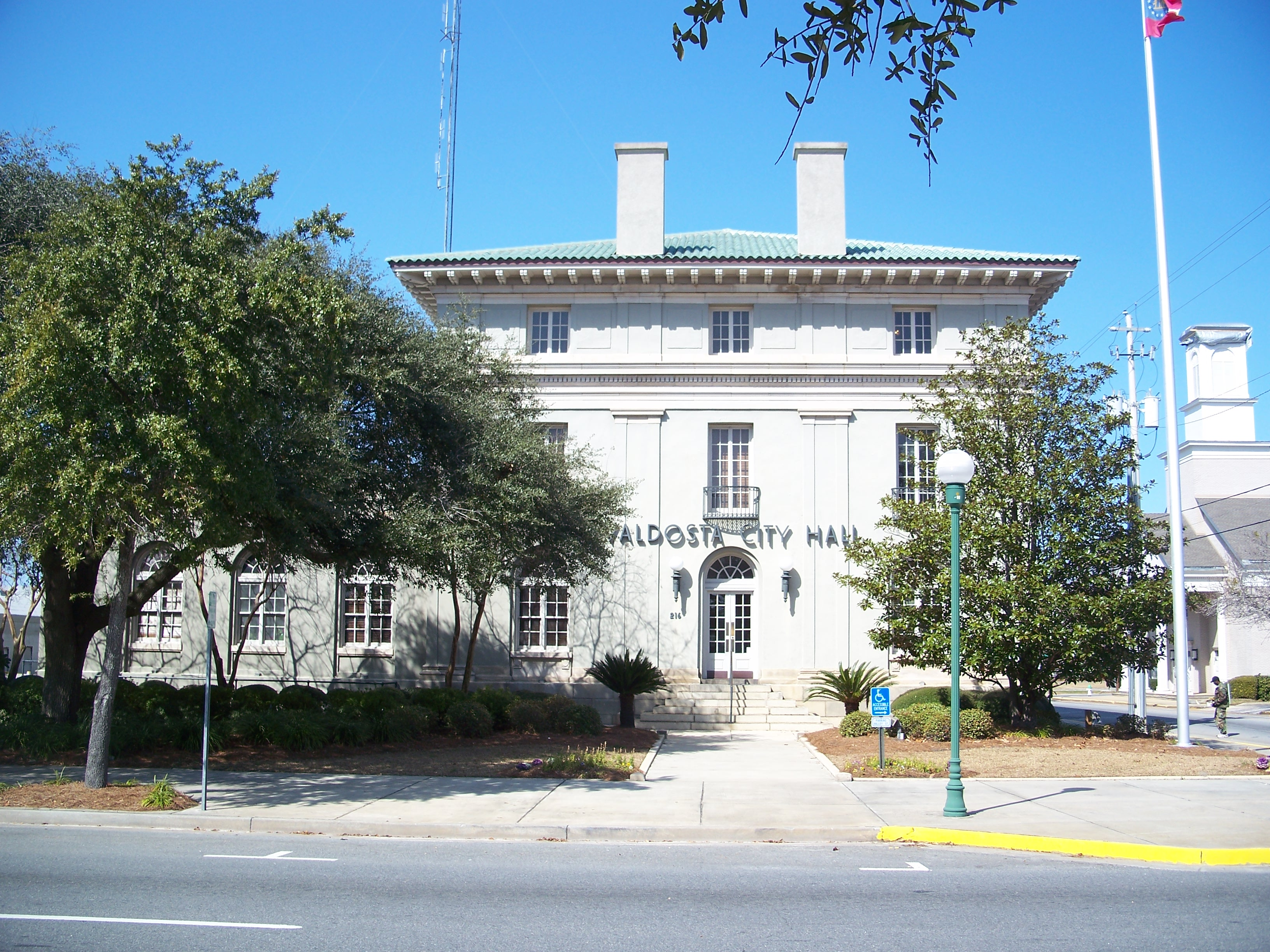
Valdosta City Hall in 2010

- R.T. Roberds
- Rufus Wiley Phillips, 1861–1863
- Henry Burroughs (H.B.) Holliday
- R.T. Middleton, 1875–1876
- J.O. Varnedoe, 1877–1878
- I.N. Davis, 1880–1881
- J.W. Wells, 1881–1882
- J.M. Wilkinson, 1882–1885
- B.F. Whittington, 1885–1886
- N.A. Williams, 1886–1887
- W.L. Thomas, 1887–1891
- W.H. Griffin, 1892–1895
- E.L. Moore, 1892–1893
- J.G. Cranford, 1895–1897
- O.M. Smith, 1897–1898
- A.H. Smith, 1898–1899
- Charles Bunyon Peeples, 1899–1900
- M.A. Briggs, 1904–1906
- J.T. Roberts, 1906–1914
- T.B. Converse Jr., 1914–1918
- B.H. Jones, 1918–1920
- Walter D. Peeples, 1920–1926
- Wilburn H. McKey, 1926–1930
- Philip C. Pendleton, 1930–1932
- John Robert Dasher, 1930
- J.D. Ashley, 1934–1944
- Frank Darnell Rose, 1944–1946
- H.B Edwards Sr., 1946–1948
- J.E. ‘Ed’ Mathis, 1948–1952
- John Bray Gidden, 1952–1956
- Emory P. Bass, 1956–1958
- A.J. Strickland III, 1958–1960
- Maxwell Oliver, 1960–1964
- Richard M. Stewart, 1964–1966
- James M. Beck, 1966–1970, 1972–1974
- Aubrey J. Stump, 1970–1972
- Gil A. Harbin, 1974–1980
- Ernest J. Nijem, 1980–1986
- Walter Gillican (Gill) Autrey Jr., 1986–1988
- James H. Rainwater, 1988–2004
- John J. Fretti, ca.2004–2011
- Joseph “Sonny” Vickers (interim) -Sept 2011 - Dec 31 2011
- John Gayle, ca.2012–2017
- Scott James Matheson, 2020–present

== See also ==
- Valdosta history
