= Jon Ossoff =

American politician (born 1987)

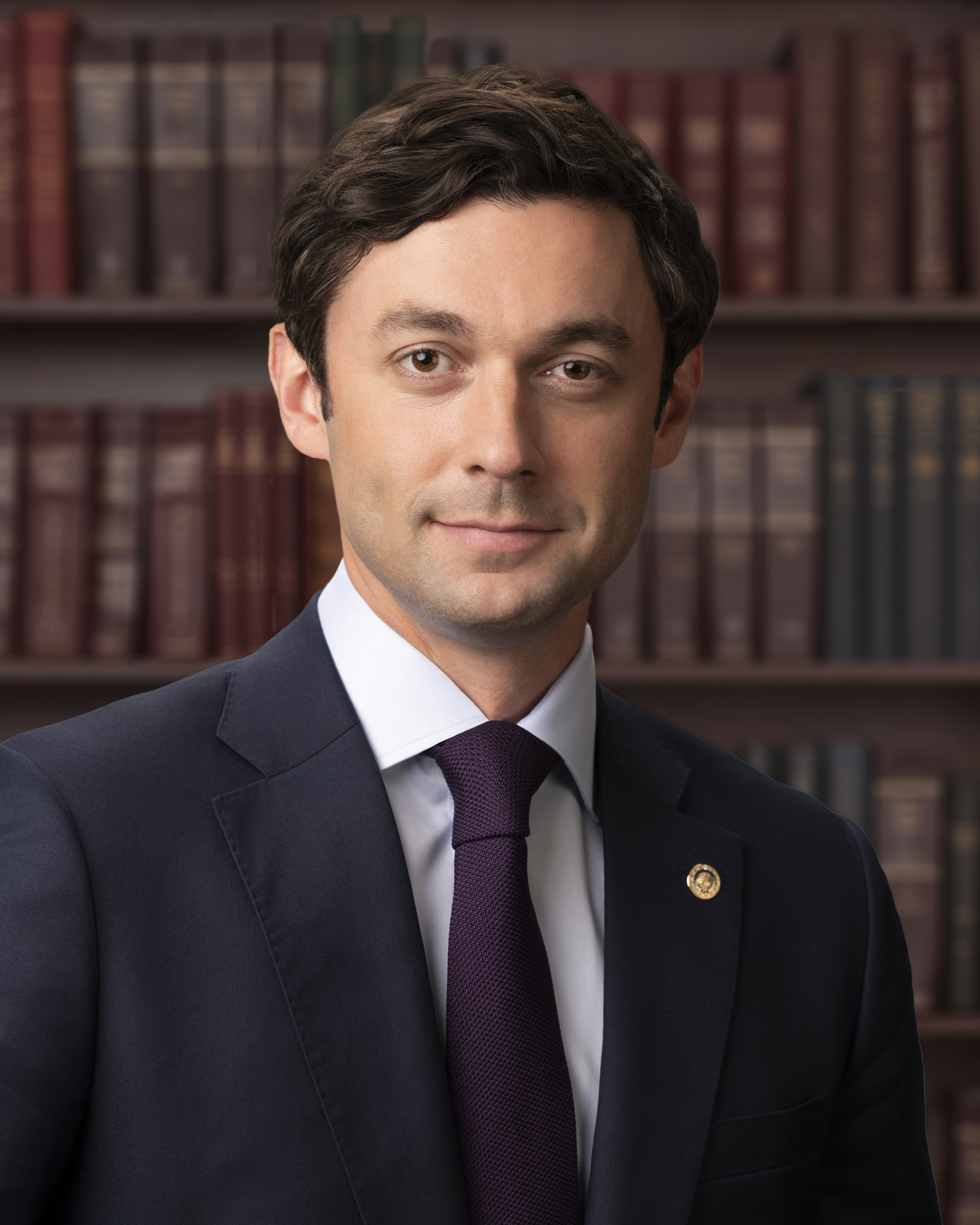
- Official portrait, 2021

United States Senator from Georgia
- Incumbent
- Assumed office January 20, 2021 Serving with Raphael Warnock
- Preceded by: David Perdue

Personal details
- Born: Thomas Jonathan Ossoff; February 16, 1987 (age 39) Atlanta, Georgia, U.S.
- Party: Democratic
- Spouse: Alisha Kramer (m. 2017)
- Children: 2
- Education: Georgetown University (BS); London School of Economics (MSc)
- Website: Senate website Campaign website
- Ossoff's voice Ossoff on a bipartisan investigation into the medical mistreatment of women in U.S. detention Recorded November 15, 2022

Thomas Jonathan Ossoff (Note: Pronunciation: /ˈɒsɔːf/ OSS-off) (born February 16, 1987) is an American politician who has served since 2021 as the senior United States senator from Georgia. (Note: Despite being sworn in at the same time as fellow Georgia Senator Raphael Warnock, Ossoff is the senior senator because his surname precedes Warnock's alphabetically.) A member of the Democratic Party, he is the youngest incumbent U.S. senator.

Born in Atlanta, Ossoff graduated from Georgetown University in 2009 and the London School of Economics in 2013. He worked as a national security staffer and legislative assistant for U.S. representative Hank Johnson, and then as managing director of an investigative documentary production company. He first ran for Congress in a 2017 special election, narrowly losing a seat long considered a Republican stronghold.

Ossoff was elected to the U.S. Senate in 2021, defeating Republican incumbent David Perdue in a runoff. He was elected alongside Raphael Warnock on the same day, which was decisive in securing a 50–50 Senate majority for Democrats, with Vice President Kamala Harris as the tie-breaking vote. Ossoff is the youngest person elected to the Senate since 1980, the first senator born in the 1980s, and the first millennial U.S. senator. He and Warnock are the only two Democrats to represent Georgia in the Senate since Zell Miller left office in 2005.

Ossoff was reelected in 2026, defeating Republican nominee Mike Collins in a landslide.

== Early life and education ==
Thomas Jonathan Ossoff was born on February 16, 1987, in Atlanta, Georgia, and raised in Northlake, an unincorporated community northeast of Atlanta.

Ossoff's mother, Heather Fenton, is an Australian immigrant who was born and raised in Sydney and immigrated to the United States when she was 23. She worked as a management consultant and co-founded NewPower PAC, an organization that works to elect women to local offices in Georgia.

His father, Richard Ossoff, is an attorney who owns Strafford Publications, an Atlanta-based continuing education and publishing company, and was active in the 1980s fight against the Presidential Parkway planned for Atlanta.

Ossoff's paternal family is of Litvak Jewish descent, originating from the cities of Slutsk, in present-day Belarus, and Vilnius, Lithuania. Their surname was Osshowsky (Note: Belarusian: Асоўскі, romanized: Asoŭski; Russian: Оссовский, romanized: Ossovsky) before being simplified to Ossoff. His paternal ancestors fled pogroms in the early 20th century, and in a 2020 interview he said he grew up among Holocaust survivor relatives, which strongly influenced him and his worldviews.

His mother is not Jewish, and Ossoff did not formally convert to Judaism until his bar mitzvah. He previously held dual Australian citizenship through his mother.

Ossoff attended The Paideia School, a private school in Atlanta. At 17, after reading the autobiography of civil rights leader and U.S. representative John Lewis, Ossoff wrote a letter to Lewis, who then offered him an internship. They remained friends until Lewis's death. Ossoff is a 2009 graduate of Georgetown University's Walsh School of Foreign Service with a Bachelor of Science in culture and politics. He earned a Master of Science in international political economy from the London School of Economics in 2013.

== Early career ==
In 2006, Ossoff volunteered for Hank Johnson's campaign to unseat Democratic U.S. Representative Cynthia McKinney. After Johnson won, Ossoff joined his congressional office, working as a national security staffer and legislative assistant for foreign affairs and defense policy from 2007 to 2012. From 2013 to 2021, Ossoff was managing director and chief executive officer of Insight: The World Investigates (TWI), a London-based investigative television production company that works with reporters to create documentaries about corruption in foreign countries. The firm produced BBC investigations about ISIS war crimes and death squads in East Africa. Ossoff was involved in producing a documentary about the staging of a play in Sierra Leone. He had previously received an inheritance of an unknown amount from his grandfather, a former co-owner of a Massachusetts leather factory, of which he used $250,000 to co-fund Insight: TWI alongside company founder and former BBC reporter Ron McCullagh, who first met Ossoff when he was 16 years old during a family vacation to France and with whom he kept in contact afterward.

=== 2017 U.S. House campaign ===
Results of the 2017 special House election; Ossoff lost to Karen Handel 52 to 48 percent.

After learning that Republican Tom Price of Georgia's 6th congressional district had been appointed secretary of health and human services by President-elect Donald Trump, Ossoff announced his candidacy for the special election on January 5, 2017. He was endorsed by congressmen Hank Johnson and John Lewis and by state House Democratic leader Stacey Abrams. He also received public support from U.S. Senator Bernie Sanders. Ossoff raised more than $8.3 million by early April of that year.

According to The Atlanta Journal-Constitution, Ossoff "transformed what was expected to be a quiet battle for a long-safe Republican seat into a proxy fight over Trump, the health care overhaul, and the partisan struggle for suburbia". When he entered the race, the Cook Partisan Voting Index rated Georgia's 6th congressional district at R+14; the district was not considered competitive and had been represented in Congress by Republicans since 1978. Less than two months before Ossoff's announcement, Price had been reelected with 62% of the vote.

Ossoff grew up in what is now the 6th district, where his family still lives, although as of the election, he lived about 1.5 miles (2.4 km) outside the district's boundaries, in the 4th district. He said he lived in the 4th only temporarily so that his girlfriend, now wife, who was then an Emory University medical student, could walk to work. According to the US Constitution, members of the House must live in the state that contains the district they represent, but need not live in that district. The two became engaged during the campaign.

On April 18, 2017, no candidate received 50% of the vote in the blanket primary. Ossoff led with about 48.1% of the vote, Republican candidate Karen Handel received 19.8%, and the remainder went to 16 other candidates. Ossoff won all but 1% of the Democratic vote, whereas the Republican vote was heavily split. Republicans collectively won 51.2% of the overall vote. Because no candidate secured an absolute majority, the two leading candidates, Ossoff and Handel, competed in a runoff election on June 20, 2017.

Ossoff broke national fundraising records for a U.S. House candidate. In total, his campaign raised more than $23 million, two-thirds of it from small-dollar donors nationwide. Combined spending by the campaigns and outside groups on their behalf totaled more than $55 million, making this the most expensive House election in U.S. history. During the campaign, Republican strategy focused on connecting Ossoff to Democratic minority leader Nancy Pelosi, regarded as a polarizing and unpopular figure by Republicans; Ossoff declined to say whether, if elected, he would support Pelosi for Speaker.

In the June 20 runoff, Handel defeated Ossoff by 9,282 votes. According to Atlanta Magazine, "while his percentage of the total vote remained steady from April to now, Ossoff garnered 32,220 more votes in those three months, a 34 percent increase ... Ossoff and his allies might have scooped up nearly every Democrat vote there was to get—and it still wasn't enough to overcome the GOP's numerical advantage." The New York Times reported that he "produced probably the strongest Democratic turnout in an off-year election in at least a decade", "brought a surprising number of irregular young and nonwhite voters to the polls", and nearly doubled youth turnout in the 6th district from the 2014 midterm election. But according to The Atlanta Journal-Constitution, "surging Democratic turnout wasn't enough to overcome heavy GOP voting in a district where Republicans far outnumber Democrats". In an op-ed for The New York Times, Frank Bruni called the race "demoralizing for Democrats". This was as close as a Democrat had come to winning this district since it assumed its current configuration as a northern suburban district in 1992; Democratic nominees had won more than 40% of the vote only twice before.

On February 23, 2018, Ossoff announced he would not seek the seat in 2018; Democrat Lucy McBath won the seat in November 2018.

== U.S. Senate ==
=== Elections ===
==== 2020–2021 election ====
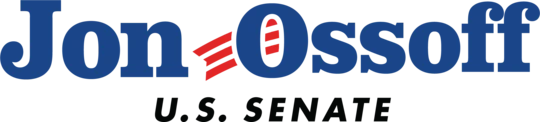
Jon Ossoff for Senate logo

Ossoff ran in the Democratic primary election to unseat incumbent Republican senator David Perdue in the 2020 Senate election in Georgia. On June 10, Ossoff advanced to the general election by winning 53% of the vote. In July 2020, Perdue's campaign ran a Facebook advertisement in which Ossoff's nose was digitally altered to be larger, which Ossoff called "one of the most classic anti-Semitic tropes". Perdue's campaign said Perdue had not seen the image and that the widening and elongation of his nose was done by a vendor. The Perdue campaign pulled the advertisement.

An ad from David Perdue's campaign with Ossoff's (right) nose controversially enlarged

By October 2020, Ossoff's campaign had raised more than $100 million, making him the best-funded Senate candidate in U.S. history.

In the November 3 general election, Perdue received 2,462,617 votes (49.73%), and Ossoff 2,374,519 (47.95%). Since no candidate had a majority, Perdue and Ossoff advanced to a January 5, 2021, runoff election.

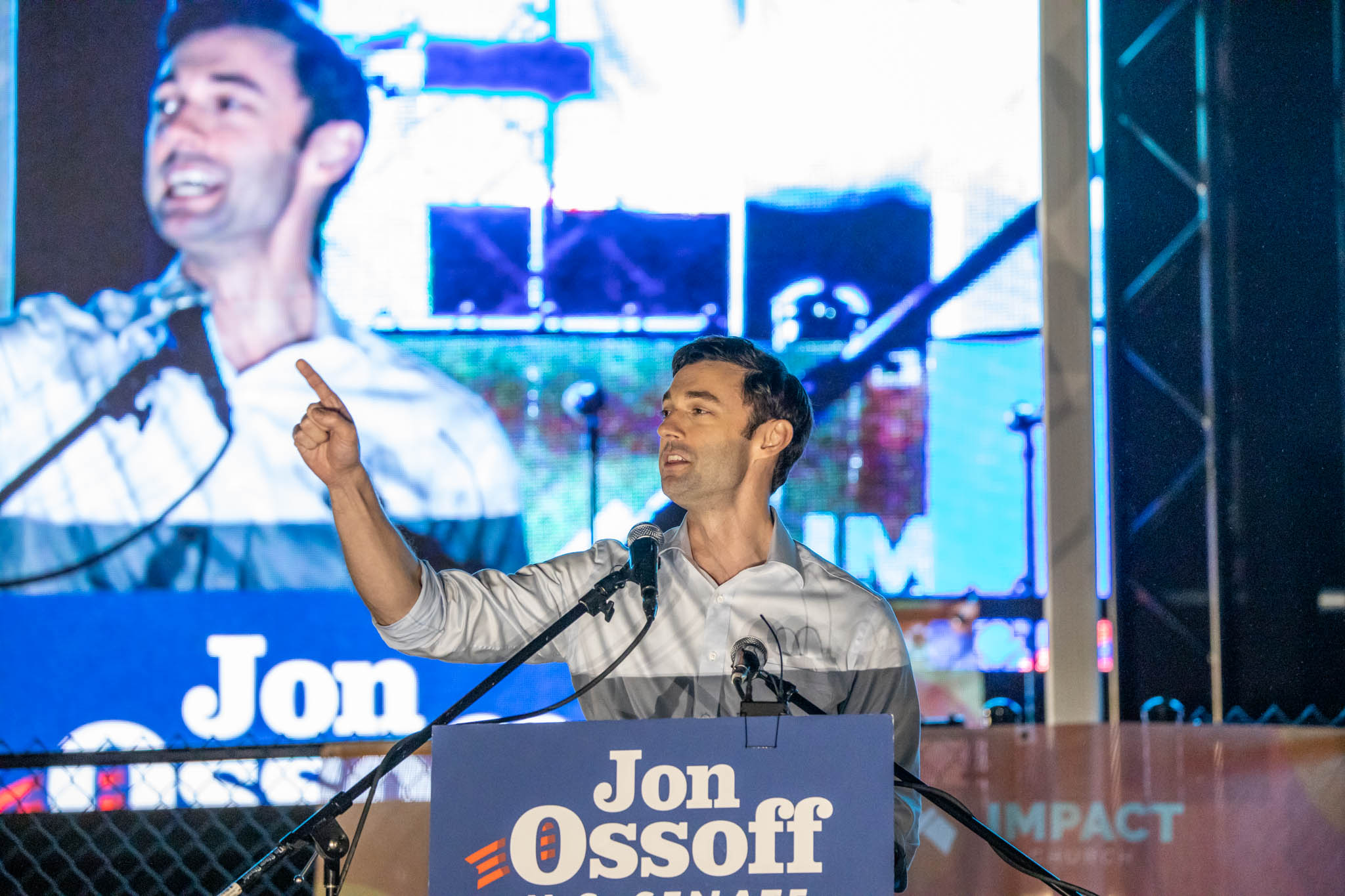
Ossoff speaks to supporters at a campaign rally on November 10, 2020.

The Ossoff campaign's closing argument focused on the $2,000 stimulus payments that he and Raphael Warnock would approve if they were elected, giving Democrats a Senate majority.

Ossoff declared victory on the morning of January 6, and most major news outlets called the race for him later that day. Perdue won more counties, but Ossoff won overwhelmingly in the inner ring of the Atlanta metropolitan area. He won Cobb and Gwinnett Counties, which had recently swung Democratic, by about 40,000 and 74,000 votes, respectively. The latter exceeded his statewide margin of about 55,000 votes. He ran slightly behind Warnock, who defeated Kelly Loeffler by 70,400 votes by also running up his margins in the Atlanta area. Perdue conceded on January 8.

Ossoff is the first Democrat elected to a full term in the Senate from Georgia since Max Cleland in 1996. He and Warnock are the first Democratic U.S. senators from Georgia since Zell Miller left office in 2005. Ossoff assumed the role of senior U.S. senator from Georgia once he was sworn into office, making him the youngest senior senator since Robert M. La Follette Jr. and the most junior senior senator since Hiram Fong, who was 99th in seniority from Hawaii's admission until the end of the 86th Congress in 1961.

Ossoff's and Warnock's elections were critical in securing a 50–50 Senate majority for Democrats, with Vice President Kamala Harris as the tie-breaking vote.

==== 2026 election ====
Ossoff ran for reelection in 2026. The Republican nominee in the general election was U.S. Representative Mike Collins.

Ossoff's campaign focused on healthcare, the high cost of living, and the 2026 Iran War. He criticized Donald Trump and Collins over their economic policies, arguing that Trump's tariffs and the war in Iran had contributed to rising costs for Americans. Ossoff also criticized Collins for his close alignment with Trump, calling him "Trump's puppet."

Ossoff defeated Collins in the general election.

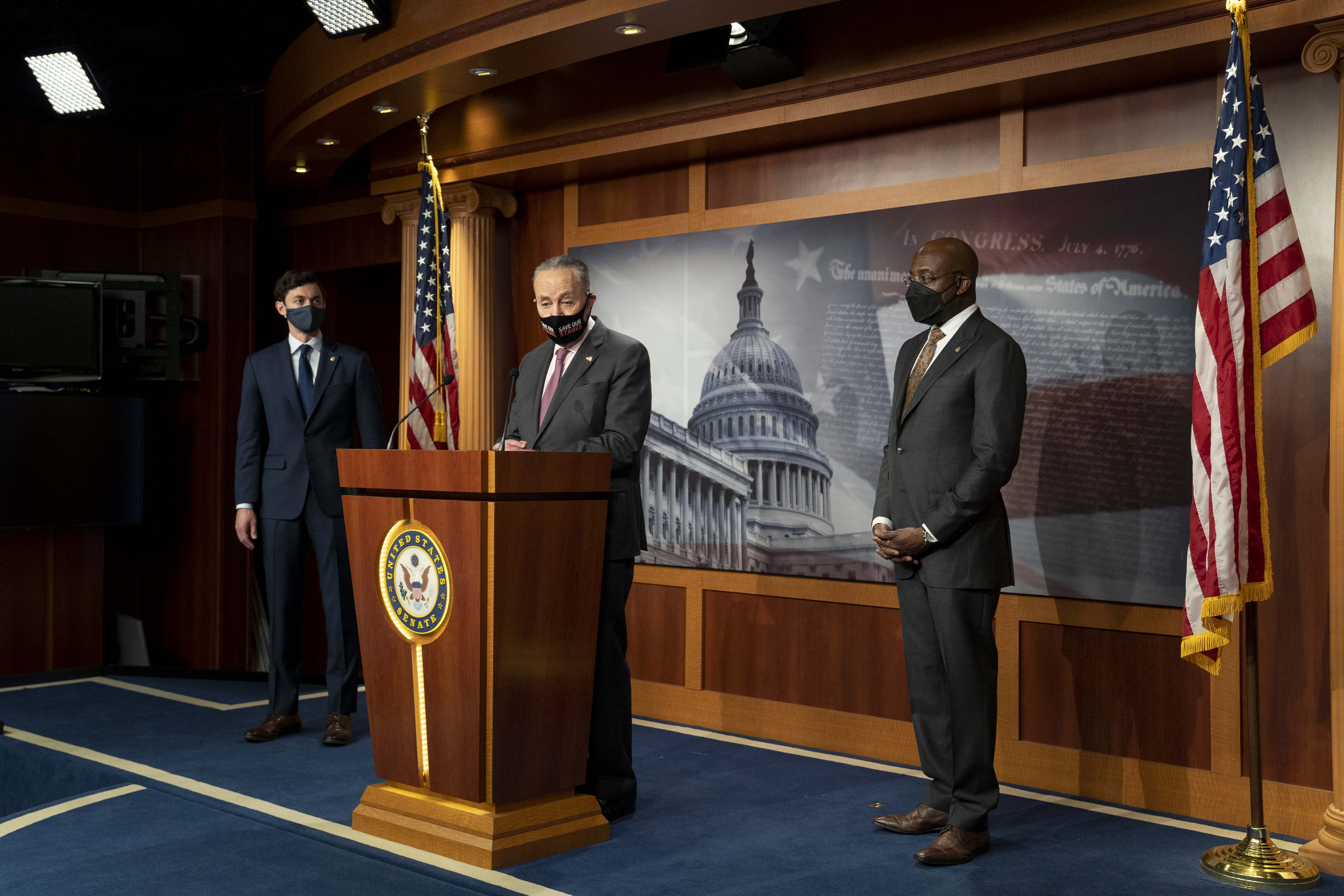
Ossoff with Chuck Schumer and fellow Georgia Senator Raphael Warnock in 2021

=== Tenure ===
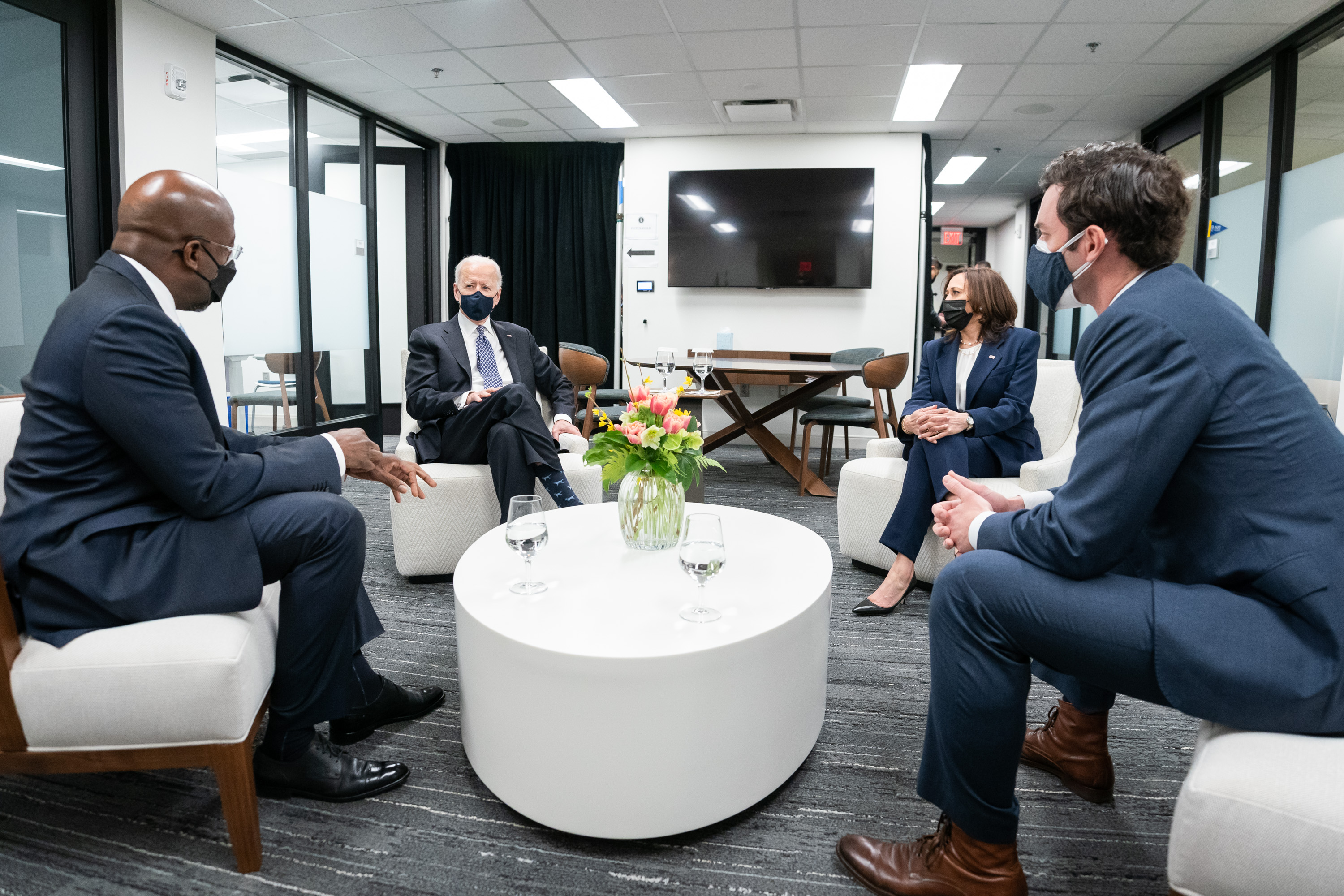
Ossoff and fellow Georgia Senator Raphael Warnock meet with President Joe Biden and Vice President Kamala Harris at Emory University on March 19, 2021.

On January 20, Ossoff was sworn into the Senate by Vice President Kamala Harris, alongside newly elected fellow Georgia Senator Raphael Warnock and California Senator Alex Padilla. When Ossoff took office, he became the first Jewish senator from Georgia and the first Jewish senator elected from the Deep South since Richard Stone in 1974, the first senator born in the 1980s as a millennial and, at age 33, the youngest member of the chamber. He was sworn into office using the Bible of Jacob M. Rothschild, a deceased rabbi of Hebrew Benevolent Congregation Temple in Atlanta, which was bombed in 1958 by white supremacists for Rothschild's civil rights activism. Ossoff's bar mitzvah was held at the temple.

On December 3, 2021, Ossoff asked Secretary of Education Miguel Cardona to help Morris Brown College, a historically black college that Ossoff pledged to help during his campaign, regain its accreditation after losing it in 2002 due to "years of financial issues and mismanagement". The Department of Education granted students the right to apply for federal financial aid, and the school regained accreditation in April 2022.

Ossoff was part of a bipartisan visit to China led by Senate Majority Leader Chuck Schumer in October 2023. The delegation met General Secretary of the Chinese Communist Party Xi Jinping in Beijing. They also met Director of the Office of the Central Foreign Affairs Commission Wang Yi, Chairman of the Standing Committee of the National People's Congress Zhao Leji, and Party Secretary of Shanghai Chen Jining.

In January 2022, Ossoff introduced legislation to ban members of Congress and their spouses from trading stocks.

Ossoff campaigned for President Biden's reelection campaign in 2024. After Biden's debate performance and the health concerns it sparked, some Democrats called for him to drop out of the race. Ossoff was not among them. Biden withdrew on July 21 and endorsed Vice President Kamala Harris, as did Ossoff.

According to a FiveThirtyEight analysis, Ossoff's votes in the 117th Congress were in alignment with Joe Biden 97% of the time. Ossoff was a reliable supporter of Biden's legislative efforts during his presidency.

Ossoff has been a strong fundraiser. He rallied and fundraised for Democratic candidates nationally.

In April 2026, Ossoff said he was not interested in running for president in 2028. After Michelle Goldberg touted Ossoff as a 2028 presidential contender in a June 2026 The New York Times editorial, Ossoff strongly reiterated to CNN's Manu Raju that he would not run in 2028. After winning reelection, Ossoff was still mentioned as a potential 2028 candidate.

=== Committee assignments ===
119th Congress

- Committee on Appropriations
- Committee on Rules and Administration
- Select Committee on Intelligence

==== Current ====
- Committee on Rules and Administration
- Select Committee on Intelligence

==== Previous ====
- Committee on Banking, Housing, and Urban Affairs (117th Congress)
- Committee on the Judiciary
  - Subcommittee on the Constitution
  - Subcommittee on Criminal Justice and Counterterrorism
  - Subcommittee on Human Rights (Chair)
  - Subcommittee on Intellectual Property
  - Subcommittee on Privacy, Technology and the Law
- Committee on Homeland Security and Governmental Affairs
  - Subcommittee on Emerging Threats and Spending Oversight
  - Subcommittee on Investigations (Permanent) (Chair, 117th Congress)

== Political positions ==
Ossoff delivers victory speech after winning re-election, November 2026

In 2017, The New Yorker wrote that Ossoff has "progressive positions on women's issues and health care" and "moderate stances on jobs and security". Matthew Yglesias of Vox also called Ossoff a moderate, and called his 2017 run for office an "Obama-style campaign." According to The Washington Post, Ossoff's 2017 campaign opted "not to turn the special election into a referendum on Trump's alleged scandals" but to focus on "policy decisions by the president and congressional Republicans". The Atlanta Journal-Constitution wrote that he "often tried to avoid nationalizing that campaign over fears of losing moderate voters". The New York Times observed that his 2017 campaign distanced itself from the national Democratic Party.

In 2020, The Atlanta Journal-Constitution wrote that Ossoff was "more unapologetic about embracing liberal policy ideas than his Democratic predecessors during past statewide races. And where he once hesitated to hit Trump directly, he now pulls no punches as he seeks to tie Perdue to his White House ally."

In 2023, the Lugar Center ranked Ossoff 33rd among U.S. senators for bipartisanship. In 2025, The Associated Press wrote: "There's the Jon Ossoff who built his political career around criticizing Donald Trump. There's also the Ossoff who works with Republicans, advancing the interests of Georgia's farmers and military bases."

=== Abortion ===
Ossoff supports abortion rights. He pledged to support only judges who would uphold Roe v. Wade, and he also supports Planned Parenthood. In response to the June 2022 overturning of Roe v. Wade, Ossoff said the U.S. Supreme Court had "stripped American women of autonomy over their most personal health care decisions".

=== Cannabis legalization ===
Ossoff has said, "It's past time to legalize, regulate, and tax cannabis – whose prohibition only enriches cartels, bail bondsmen, and the owners of private prisons". He has said that he will push for "nationwide legalization" of cannabis, calling it "much less dangerous than alcohol".

=== Criminal justice ===
In 2020, Ossoff opposed prison sentencing for nonviolent drug offenses. His 2017 website said, "Violent crime, murder, rape, human trafficking, and corruption are rampant, while we spend billions locking up nonviolent drug offenders."

In 2020, Ossoff opposed defunding the police and abolishing Immigration and Customs Enforcement (ICE).

=== Economy and financial regulation ===
Ossoff supported increasing economic relief for businesses and households affected by the COVID-19 pandemic.

Ossoff supports raising the federal minimum wage to at least $15 per hour.

Ossoff voted for the Infrastructure Investment and Jobs Act.

=== Environment ===
Ossoff with Secretary of Transportation Pete Buttigieg, December 15, 2023

Ossoff accepts the scientific consensus on climate change, and has said that "climate change is a threat to our security and prosperity". He supports U.S. participation in the Paris Agreement. He is not in favor of the Green New Deal.

In 2022, Ossoff blocked a proposed titanium mine in the Okefenokee Swamp after the U.S. Fish and Wildlife Service warned of severe potential damage to the wildlife refuge. Twin Pines Minerals LLC proposed the mine in 2018.

=== Foreign policy ===
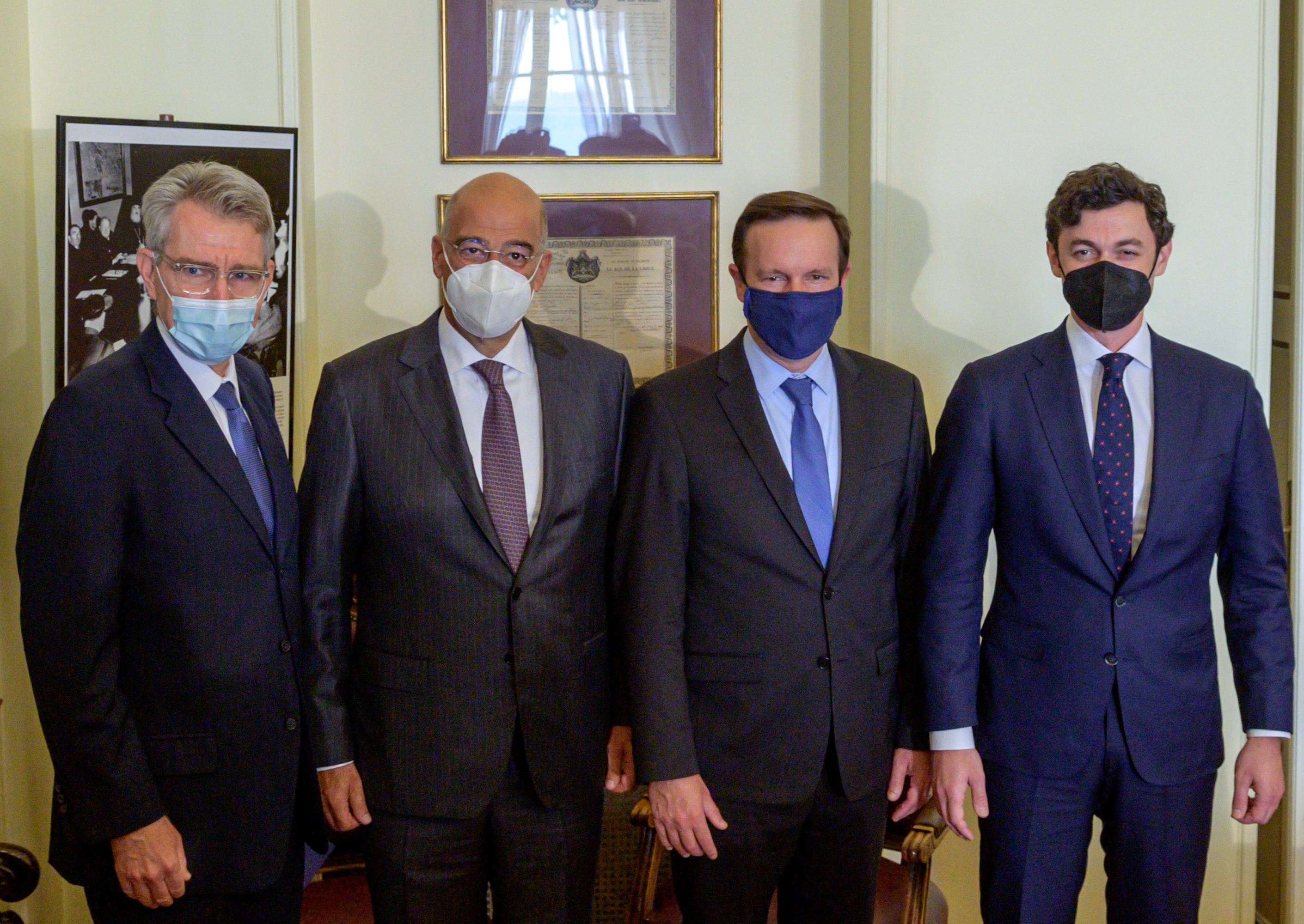
Ossoff and U.S. Senator Chris Murphy meet with Greek Minister of Foreign Affairs Nikos Dendias on September 6, 2021.

==== Afghanistan ====
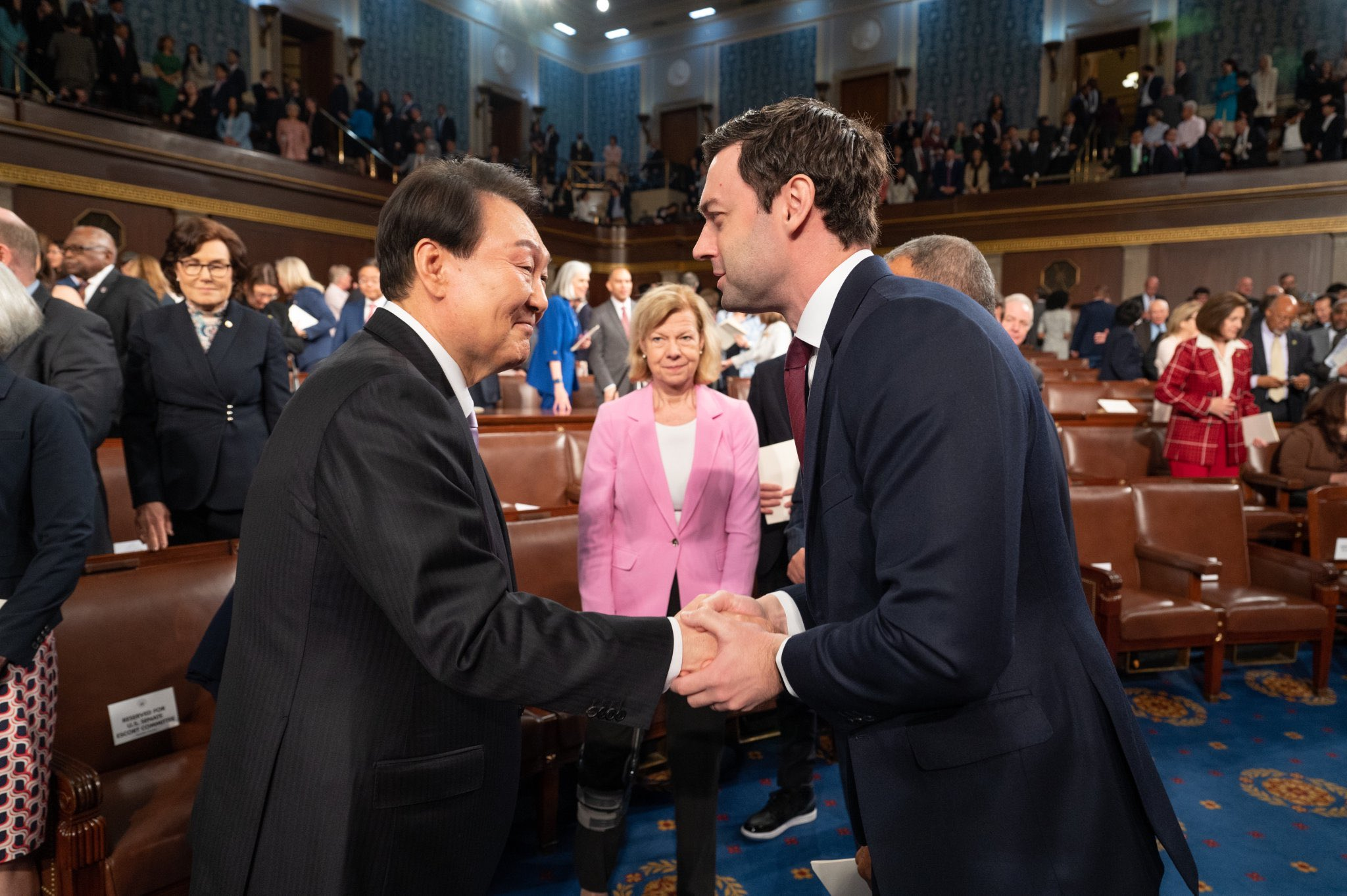
Ossoff greets South Korean President Yoon Suk Yeol in 2023.

Ossoff resisted criticizing President Joe Biden for the withdrawal of troops from Afghanistan in August 2021, as other Democratic politicians had at the time, saying he was focused on "supporting the State Department and the Department of Defense as they work with limited time to expedite the evacuation" of stranded Americans and American-allied Afghans. Of the subsequent airport attack in Kabul, which killed 13 American military personnel, he said: "I condemn this cowardly and despicable terrorist attack."

==== China ====
Ossoff has said the U.S. must end its reliance on Chinese solar products, as they are linked to forced labor involving the Uyghurs. He condemns the authoritarianism of the Chinese Communist Party and supports the pro-democracy movement in Hong Kong.

==== Israel ====
In 2020, Ossoff said he is committed to "the security of Israel as the homeland for the Jewish people" and to strengthening the U.S.–Israel alliance.

Ossoff led a group of 25 Democratic senators who called for an immediate ceasefire in a joint statement during the 2021 Israel–Palestine crisis. The statement said: "Israel has the right to defend itself from Hamas's rocket attacks, in a manner proportionate with the threat its citizens are facing." Ossoff has said Israel's situation is highly important to him due to his having relatives in the country and that he wishes for "a future where all people in the region live in peace, live in prosperity, and have equal rights".

In the Israeli–Palestinian conflict, Ossoff supports a two‑state solution that respects the rights of both Israelis and Palestinians.

On November 20, 2024, Ossoff was among 19 senators who supported resolutions proposed by Senator Bernie Sanders that would have blocked U.S. military aid to Israel amid the Gaza war. The resolutions did not pass but were designed to show Democratic opposition to President Biden's and the United States' support for Israel in the Gaza war.

In April 2025, Ossoff voted against a pair of resolutions from Sanders to withhold billions of dollars in offensive weapons sales and other military aid to Israel. Ossoff has publicly called the U.S.-Israel relationship "ironclad" but does not believe in unconditional U.S. support.

In July 2025, Ossoff voted to prohibit a sale of 20,000 fully automatic rifles to Israel.

==== Iran ====
Ossoff is deeply critical of the 2026 Iran war. He has said it caused "skyrocketing inflation" and "massive damage to our reputation". In March 2026, he voted for a War Powers Resolution designed to limit President Trump's, or any other president's, ability to use military force in Iran without congressional authorization.

=== Government reform ===
Ossoff has called for the repeal of "wasteful, anti-competitive special interest subsidies that make it hard for entrepreneurs to raise capital, enter the market, create jobs, and compete with larger firms who have lobbyists in Washington." He has said the government funds "$16 billion in duplicate programs. That can be cut", an assertion PolitiFact rated "Mostly True".

Ossoff supports statehood for the District of Columbia and for Puerto Rico.

Ending stock trading by members of Congress was a theme of Ossoff's 2020 campaign.

=== Healthcare ===
Ossoff supports the Patient Protection and Affordable Care Act (Obamacare). His health care policy includes three principles: "One, no American should suffer or die from preventable or treatable illness. Two, no one should go broke because they get sick. And three, no business should go under or lay off employees because it can't keep up with health insurance premiums." He does not support a single-payer health care system, such as Medicare for All. He opposed both the March 2017 and May 2017 versions of the American Health Care Act, the House Republican bill that would have repealed the Affordable Care Act. He said the May 2017 version was worse than the earlier one "because it does even less to protect those with preexisting conditions."

Ossoff told the Atlanta Journal-Constitution that he supported tax credits for small businesses related to health care.

In 2020, Ossoff declared support for a public health insurance option.

=== Immigration ===
Ossoff supports comprehensive immigration reform that would both strengthen enforcement along the Mexican border and provide a path to citizenship for some undocumented immigrants.

After the murder of Laken Riley, a Georgia nursing student killed by an undocumented immigrant, Ossoff criticized Donald Trump for his efforts to derail the passage of a bipartisan border security bill. In 2025, Ossoff was one of 12 Democratic senators who joined all Republicans in voting for the Laken Riley Act.

=== LGBTQ rights ===
Ossoff has called his support for the LGBTQ community "unwavering". He also supports the Equality Act, which would prohibit discrimination on the basis of sex, gender identity, or sexual orientation.

=== First Trump administration ===
Ossoff has been sharply critical of President Donald Trump, criticizing what he calls Trump's "divisive approach to government" and saying: "I have great respect for the office. I don't have great personal admiration for the man himself." On April 19, 2017, the day before Ossoff's primary, Trump called him a "super Liberal Democrat" who wanted to "protect criminals, allow illegal immigration and raise taxes" in a tweet. Ossoff dismissed Trump's claims and called him "misinformed". FactCheck.org found that Trump's claim was a distortion and that there was no evidence that Ossoff had ever advocated for any broad-based tax hikes. Nevertheless, Ossoff said that he would be willing to work with Trump on issues of mutual interest, such as infrastructure spending.

After Trump's disclosure of classified information to Russia, Ossoff said of impeachment, "I don't think we're there." He called for "a full and transparent and independent assessment of what level of interference there was by Russian intelligence services in the U.S. election. And overseers in Congress and any independent counsel or commission to do so should follow those facts wherever they lead."

Ossoff voted to convict Trump during his second impeachment on the charge of incitement of insurrection following the 2021 United States Capitol attack, joining all Democrats and seven Republicans.

=== Voting rights ===
Ossoff supports passage of the John Lewis Voting Rights Act.

After Georgia's Election Integrity Act of 2021 passed the state legislature and was signed into law by Governor Brian Kemp, several businesses, from the Major League Baseball organization to the production of the Will Smith film Emancipation, boycotted Georgia in protest. In an interview, Ossoff expressed his displeasure with the bill while also saying he did not support the corporate boycotts because Georgians "rely upon and hope for and welcome jobs, investment, and opportunity".

== Public image ==
Ossoff has been described as able to effectively appeal to young people by using TikTok, a social media app popular with Generation Z. On the night he was elected to the Senate, Ossoff's posts on Twitter from the previous decade, which included several references to Star Wars, the musical group Imagine Dragons, and anime, attracted renewed attention on social media. He has been called the "first Extremely Online senator".

In January 2021, Vogue reported on an "adoring" Instagram account of self-declared "simps" expressing affection for Ossoff. In July 2021, The Daily Beast reported on an "Ossimp Patrol" on Twitter that monitored "Ossoff simps" on the platform and replied to their tweets with an ActBlue link prompting them to donate to Raphael Warnock's 2022 reelection campaign and get out the vote organizations in Georgia and Texas. When shown this by The Daily Beast, Ossoff is said to have "paused for a moment" and "furrowed his brow" before saying he was not aware of any of it, but commended the "great community" that supported him during his 2020–2021 Senate campaign.

== Personal life ==
Ossoff with his family, November 2025

Ossoff began dating Alisha Kramer in 2005, when the two were in high school together. They got engaged in 2017, and married in 2018. Kramer is a physician specializing in obstetrics and gynecology, and works at Emory University. She completed her residency there in 2023 after graduating from Georgetown University and the Emory University School of Medicine. They have two children. On the night of Ossoff's election to the U.S. Senate in January 2021, Kramer was working an overnight shift at Emory University Hospital.

== Electoral history ==
=== U.S. House ===
Georgia's 6th congressional district special election, 2017
Party	Candidate	Votes	%
Democratic	Jon Ossoff	92,673	48.12
Republican	Karen Handel	38,071	19.77
Republican	Bob Gray	20,802	10.80
Republican	Dan Moody	17,028	8.84
Republican	Judson Hill	16,870	8.76
Republican	Kurt Wilson	1,820	0.95
Republican	David Abroms	1,639	0.85
Democratic	Ragin Edwards	504	0.26
Democratic	Ron Slotin	491	0.25
Republican	Bruce LeVell	455	0.24
Republican	Mohammad Ali Bhuiyan	415	0.22
Republican	Keith Grawert	415	0.22
Republican	Amy Kremer	351	0.18
Republican	William Llop	326	0.17
Democratic	Rebecca Quigg	304	0.16
Democratic	Richard Keatley	229	0.12
Independent	Alexander Hernandez	121	0.06
Independent	Andre Pollard	55	0.03
Total votes		192,569	100.00
Plurality		54,602	28.35

Georgia's 6th congressional district special election runoff, 2017
Party	Candidate	Votes	%	±%
Republican	Karen Handel	134,799	51.78%	−9.90%
Democratic	Jon Ossoff	125,517	48.22%	+9.90%
Total votes		260,316	100.0%	
Majority		9,282	3.57%	−19.8%
Turnout		260,455	58.16%	
Republican hold				

=== U.S. Senate ===
United States Senate Democratic primary in Georgia, 2020
Party	Candidate	Votes	%
Democratic	Jon Ossoff	626,819	52.82%
Democratic	Teresa Tomlinson	187,416	15.79%
Democratic	Sarah Riggs Amico	139,574	11.76%
Democratic	Maya Dillard-Smith	105,000	8.85%
Democratic	James Knox	49,452	4.17%
Democratic	Marckeith DeJesus	45,936	3.87%
Democratic	Tricia Carpenter McCracken	32,463	2.74%
Total votes		1,186,660	100.00%

United States Senate general election in Georgia, 2020
Party	Candidate	Votes	%	±%
Republican	David Perdue (incumbent)	2,462,617	49.73%	−3.16%
Democratic	Jon Ossoff	2,374,519	47.95%	+2.74%
Libertarian	Shane T. Hazel	115,039	2.32%	+0.42%
Total votes		4,952,175	100.0	

United States Senate runoff election in Georgia, 2021
Party	Candidate	Votes	%	±%
Democratic	Jon Ossoff	2,269,923	50.61%	+5.40%
Republican	David Perdue (incumbent)	2,214,979	49.39%	−3.50%
Total votes		4,484,902	100.0	
Democratic gain from Republican				

== Filmography ==
Year	Title	Role	Notes
2014	The Battle for Africa	Executive producer and writer	TV miniseries/documentary
2014	Living with Ebola	Executive producer and writer	TV documentary
2014–15	People and Power	Executive producer	2 episodes
2014–15	Africa Investigates	Executive producer	9 episodes
2015	Justice!	Executive producer	TV documentary
2016	Stacey Dooley Investigates	Executive producer	Episode: "On the Frontline: Girls, Guns and ISIS"

== See also ==
- List of Jewish members of the United States Congress

== Notes ==
Party political offices
Preceded by Michelle Nunn	Democratic nominee for U.S. Senator from Georgia (Class 2); 2020, 2026	Most recent
U.S. Senate
Preceded by David Perdue	U.S. Senator (Class 2) from Georgia; 2021–present Served alongside: Raphael Warnock	Incumbent
Honorary titles
Preceded by Josh Hawley	Baby of the Senate; 2021–present	Succeeded by James Talarico; Elect
U.S. order of precedence (ceremonial)
Preceded by Ben Ray Luján	Order of precedence of the United States as United States Senator	Succeeded by Raphael Warnock
Preceded by Alex Padilla	United States senators by seniority 77th	Succeeded by Raphael Warnock
