= 2010 United States House of Representatives elections in Georgia =

- November 2, 2010

All 13 Georgia seats to the United States House of Representatives
	Majority party	Minority party
Party	Republican	Democratic
Last election	7	6
Seats won	8	5
Seat change	▲1	▼1
Popular vote	1,528,142	940,347
Percentage	61.90%	38.09%
Swing	▲11.56%	▼11.56%

Republican hold Republican gain
Democratic hold
Republican
50–60%
60–70%
70–80%
80–90%
90–100%
Democratic
50–60%
60–70%
70–80%
80–90%

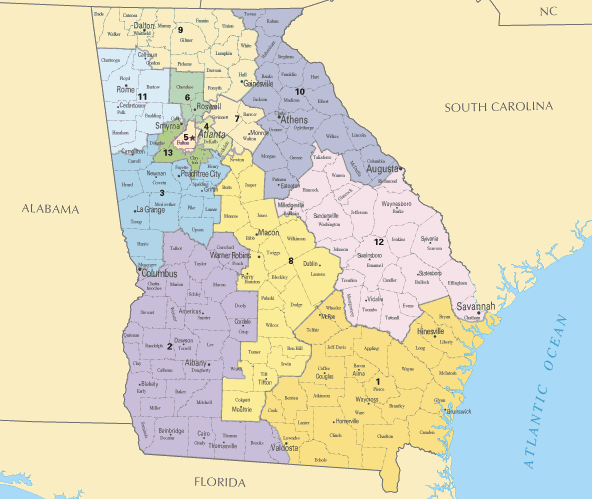
Georgia's congressional districts in 2010

Elections were held on November 2, 2010, to determine Georgia's 13 members of the United States House of Representatives. Representatives were elected for two-year terms to serve in the 112th United States Congress from January 3, 2011, until January 3, 2013. Primary elections were held on July 20, 2010, and primary runoff elections were held on August 10, 2010.

Of the 13 elections, the races in the 2nd and 8th districts were rated as competitive by CQ Politics, The Rothenberg Political Report, and Sabato's Crystal Ball, and the 2nd, 8th and 12th districts were rated as competitive by The Cook Political Report. Of Georgia's thirteen incumbents, eleven were re-elected, while one (John Linder of the 7th district) did not seek re-election and one (Jim Marshall of the 8th district) unsuccessfully sought re-election.

In total, eight Republicans and five Democrats were elected. A total of 2,468,680 votes were cast, of which 1,528,142 (61.90 percent) were for Republican candidates, 940,347 (38.09 percent) were for Democratic candidates and 191 (0.01 percent) were for write-in candidates.

== Overview ==
United States House of Representatives elections in Georgia, 2010
Party	Votes	Percentage	Seats before	Seats after	±
Republican	1,528,142	61.9%	7	8	+1
Democratic	940,347	38.1%	6	5	-1
Others	191	0.0%	0	0	-
Totals	2,468,680	100.00%	13	13	±0

=== By district ===
Results of the 2010 United States House of Representatives elections in Georgia by district:

District	Republican		Democratic		Others		Total		Result
District	Votes	%	Votes	%	Votes	%	Votes	%	Result
District 1	117,270	71.63%	46,449	28.37%	0	0.00%	163,719	100.00%	Republican hold
District 2	81,673	48.56%	86,520	51.44%	0	0.00%	168,193	100.00%	Democratic hold
District 3	168,304	69.48%	73,932	30.52%	3	0.00%	242,239	100.00%	Republican hold
District 4	44,707	25.33%	131,760	74.67%	0	0.00%	176,467	100.00%	Democratic hold
District 5	46,622	26.28%	130,782	73.72%	0	0.00%	177,404	100.00%	Democratic hold
District 6	198,100	99.91%	0	0.00%	188	0.09%	198,288	100.00%	Republican hold
District 7	160,898	67.07%	78,996	32.93%	0	0.00%	239,894	100.00%	Republican hold
District 8	102,770	52.70%	92,250	47.30%	0	0.00%	195,020	100.00%	Republican gain
District 9	173,512	100.00%	0	0.00%	0	0.00%	173,512	100.00%	Republican hold
District 10	138,062	67.36%	66,905	32.64%	0	0.00%	204,967	100.00%	Republican hold
District 11	163,515	100.00%	0	0.00%	0	0.00%	163,515	100.00%	Republican hold
District 12	70,938	43.41%	92,459	56.59%	0	0.00%	163,397	100.00%	Democratic hold
District 13	61,771	30.57%	140,294	69.43%	0	0.00%	202,065	100.00%	Democratic hold
Total	1,528,142	61.90%	940,347	38.09%	191	0.01%	2,468,680	100.00%	

== District 1 ==
2010 Georgia's 1st congressional district election
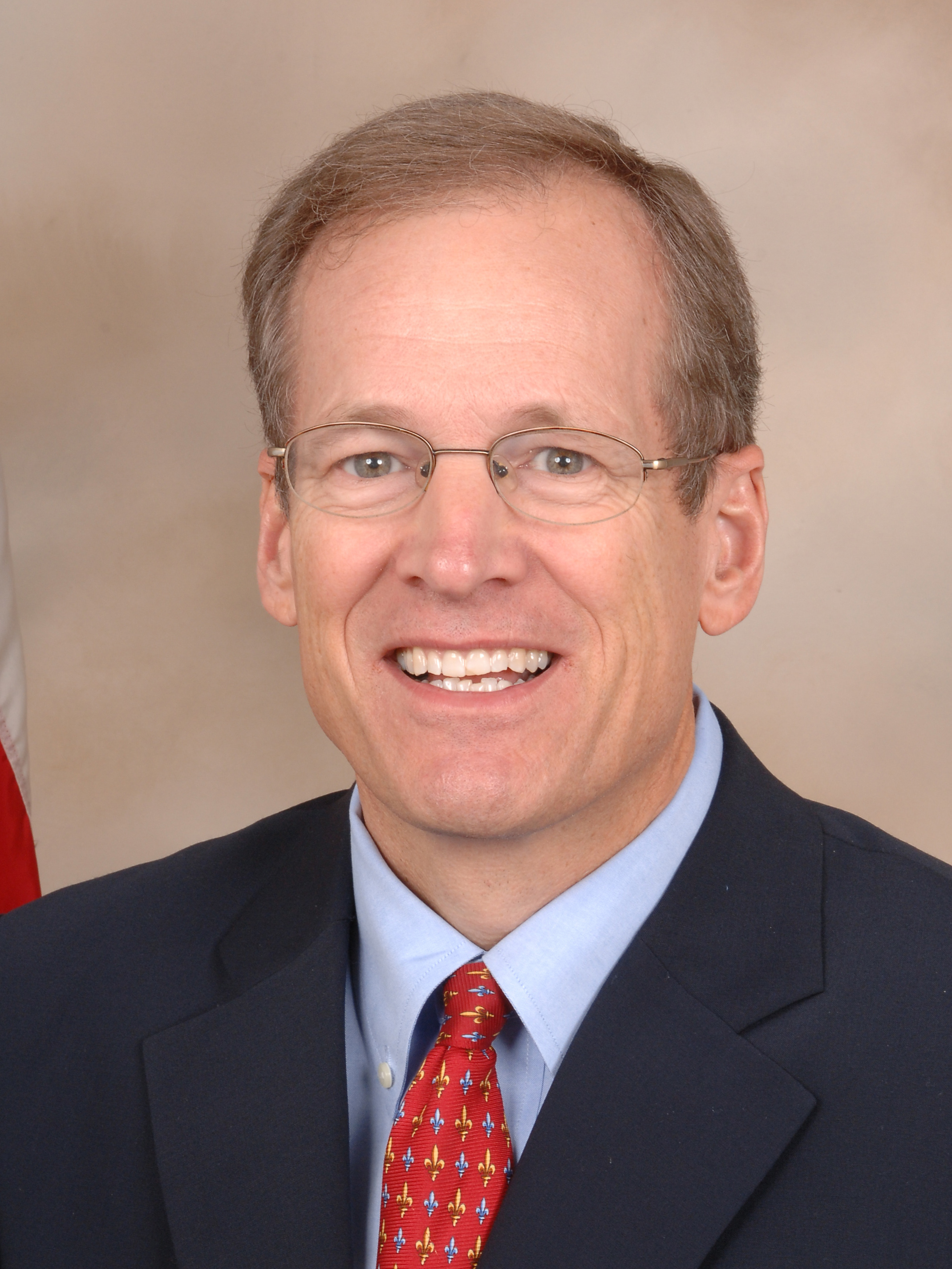

Nominee	Jack Kingston	Oscar Harris II
Party	Republican	Democratic
Popular vote	117,270	46,449
Percentage	71.6%	28.4%
- County results Kingston: 50–60% 60–70% 70–80% 80–90%
U.S. Representative before election
Jack Kingston
Republican
Elected U.S. Representative
Jack Kingston
Republican

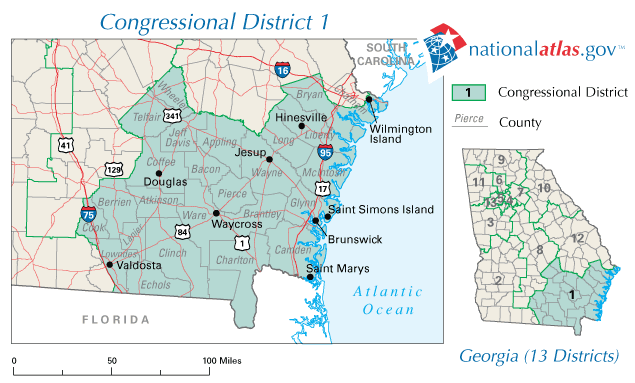
Georgia's 1st congressional district in 2010

The 1st district included Hinesville and parts of Savannah and Valdosta. The district's population was 68 percent white, 24 percent black and 5 percent Hispanic (see Race and ethnicity in the United States census); 82 percent were high school graduates and 19 percent had received a bachelor's degree or higher. Its median income was $43,481. In the 2008 presidential election the district gave 62 percent of its vote to Republican nominee John McCain and 37 percent to Democratic nominee Barack Obama.

Republican Jack Kingston, who took office in 1993, was the incumbent. Kingston was re-elected in 2008 with 67 percent of the vote. In 2010 Kingston's opponent in the general election was Democratic nominee Oscar Harris II, a farmer. Both Kingston and Harris were unopposed in their respective primaries.

Kingston raised $1,029,117 and spent $759,470. Prior to the election FiveThirtyEight's forecast gave Kingston a 100 chance of winning and projected that he would receive 71 percent of the vote to Harris's 27 percent. On election day Kingston was re-elected with 72 percent of the vote to Harris's 28 percent. Kingston was again re-elected in 2012 and unsuccessfully ran for the U.S. Senate rather than seeking re-election in 2014. He was succeeded by fellow Republican Buddy Carter.

=== Predictions ===
Source	Ranking	As of
The Cook Political Report	Safe R	November 1, 2010
Rothenberg	Safe R	November 1, 2010
Sabato's Crystal Ball	Safe R	November 1, 2010
RCP	Safe R	November 1, 2010
CQ Politics	Safe R	October 28, 2010
New York Times	Safe R	November 1, 2010
FiveThirtyEight	Safe R	November 1, 2010

=== General election results ===
Georgia's 1st district general election, November 2, 2010
Party	Candidate	Votes	%
Republican	Jack Kingston (incumbent)	117,270	71.63
Democratic	Oscar Harris II	46,449	28.37
Total votes		163,719	100.00

=== External links ===
- "Oscar Harris II campaign website". Archived from the original on November 4, 2010.
- "Jack Kingston campaign website". Archived from the original on November 1, 2010.

== District 2 ==
2010 Georgia's 2nd congressional district election
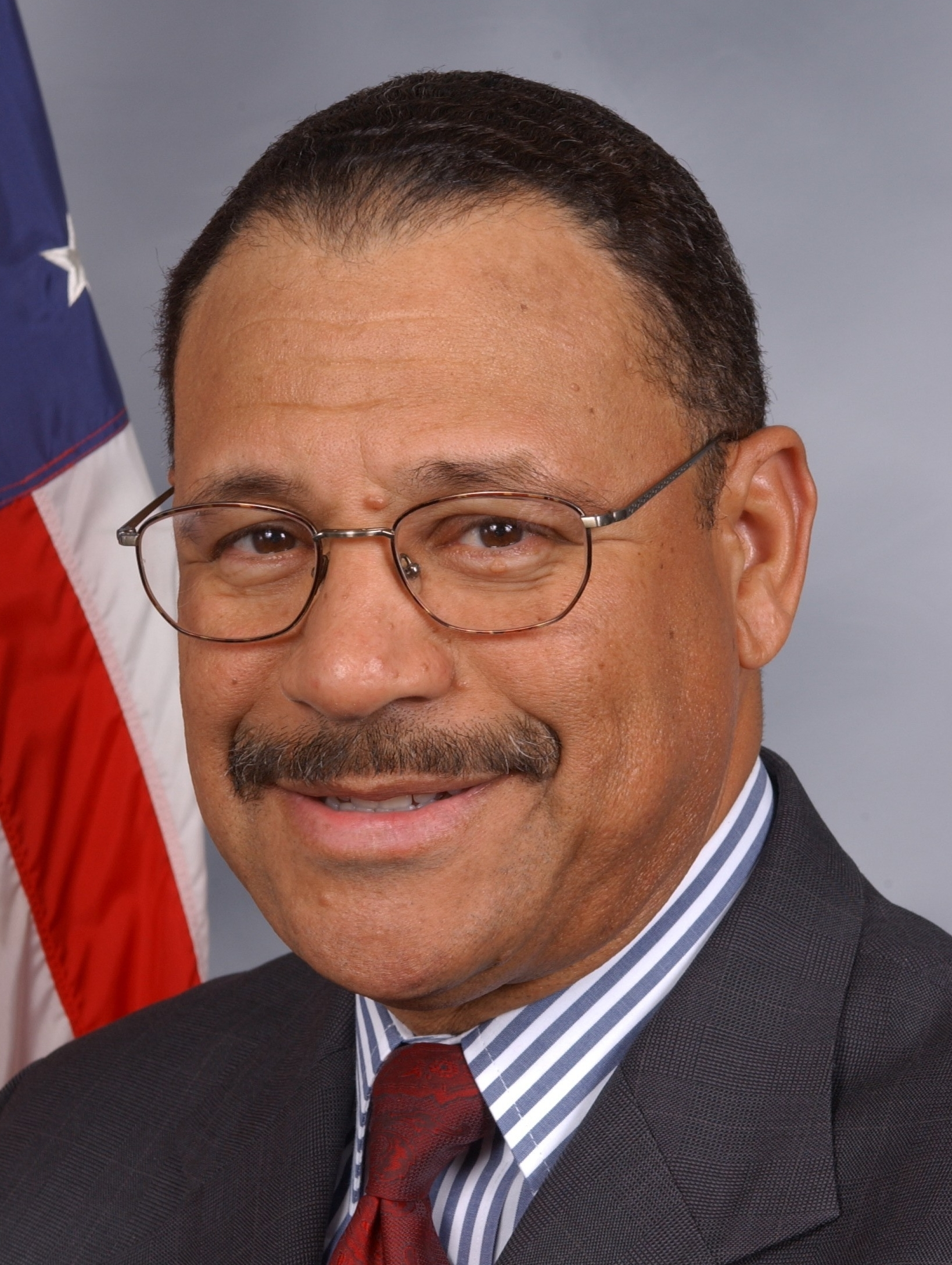

Nominee	Sanford Bishop	Mike Keown
Party	Democratic	Republican
Popular vote	86,520	81,673
Percentage	51.4%	48.6%
- County results Bishop: 50–60% 60–70% 70–80% Keown: 50–60% 60–70% 70–80%
U.S. Representative before election
Sanford Bishop
Democratic
Elected U.S. Representative
Sanford Bishop
Democratic

The 2nd district included Albany, Columbus and Thomasville. The district's population was 47 percent black and 47 percent white (see Race and ethnicity in the United States census); 77 percent were high school graduates and 15 percent had received a bachelor's degree or higher. Its median income was $34,860. In the 2008 presidential election the district gave 54 percent of its vote to Democratic nominee Barack Obama and 45 percent to Republican nominee John McCain. In 2010 the district had a Cook Partisan Voting Index of D+1.

Democrat Sanford Bishop, who took office in 1993, was the incumbent. Bishop was re-elected in 2008 with 69 percent of the vote. In 2010 Bishop's opponent in the general election was Republican nominee Mike Keown, a member of the Georgia House of Representatives. Bishop was unopposed for the Democratic nomination. Rick Allen, a medical supply businessman; and Lee Ferrell, a retired staff sergeant, also sought the Republican nomination.

Bishop raised $1,485,600 and spent $1,776,500. Keown raised $1,213,707 and spent $1,154,740. Allen raised $11,166 and spent $9,754. Ferrell raised $15,260 and spent $11,120.

An August 2010 poll by Public Opinion Strategies (POS) found Bishop leading with 50 percent to Keown's 44 percent. In a poll of 400 likely voters, conducted by POS on September 27 and 28, 2010, Bishop led with 47 percent to Keown's 46 percent while 7 percent were undecided. In a poll of 500 likely voters, conducted by Lester & Associates for Bishop's campaign between October 7 and 10, 2010, 50 percent supported Bishop while 40 percent favored Keown and 10 percent were undecided. A poll with a sample size of 836, conducted on October 19, 2010, by Landmark Communications, Inc. (LCI), found Keown leading with 47 percent to Bishop's 45 percent while 8 percent were undecided. An LCI poll with a sample size of 914, conducted on October 27, 2010, found Keown had the support of 50 percent while 46 percent backed Bishop and 4 percent were undecided.

On election day Bishop was re-elected with 51 percent of the vote to Keown's 49 percent. Bishop was again re-elected in 2012, 2014, 2016, 2018, and 2020. Keown unsuccessfully ran for a seat in the Georgia State Senate in 2013. Allen was elected as the U.S. representative for the 12th district in 2014.

=== Republican primary results ===
Georgia's 2nd district Republican primary, July 20, 2010
Party	Candidate	Votes	%
Republican	Mike Keown	23,945	80.84
Republican	Rick Allen	3,283	11.08
Republican	Lee Ferrell	2,393	8.08
Total votes		29,621	100.00

==== Predictions ====
Source	Ranking	As of
The Cook Political Report	Tossup	November 1, 2010
Rothenberg	Lean D	November 1, 2010
Sabato's Crystal Ball	Lean R (flip)	November 1, 2010
RCP	Lean R (flip)	November 1, 2010
CQ Politics	Tossup	October 28, 2010
New York Times	Tossup	November 1, 2010
FiveThirtyEight	Tossup	November 1, 2010

=== General election results ===
Georgia's 2nd district general election, November 2, 2010
Party	Candidate	Votes	%
Democratic	Sanford Bishop (incumbent)	86,520	51.44
Republican	Mike Keown	81,673	48.56
Total votes		168,193	100.00

=== External links ===
==== Campaign websites ====
- "Rick Allen campaign website". Archived from the original on July 9, 2010.
- "Sanford Bishop campaign website". Archived from the original on October 28, 2010.
- "Lee Ferrell campaign website". Archived from the original on December 23, 2010.
- "Mike Keown campaign website". Archived from the original on October 28, 2010.

==== Further reading ====
- Brown, Robbie (November 4, 2010). "Rare Winner for Southern Democrats". The New York Times.

== District 3 ==
2010 Georgia's 3rd congressional district election
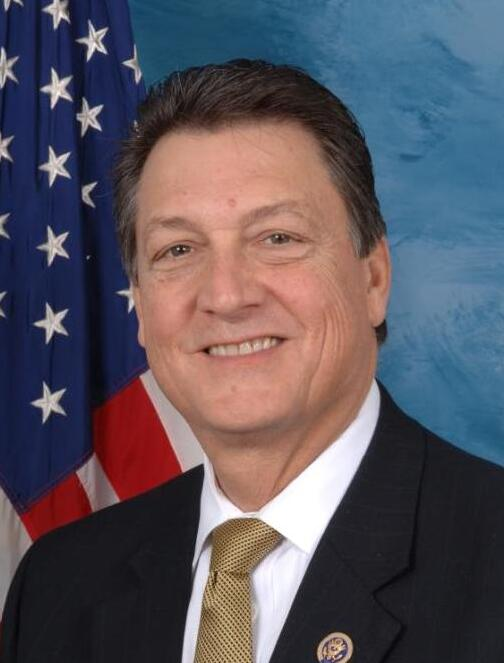

Nominee	Lynn Westmoreland	Frank Saunders
Party	Republican	Democratic
Popular vote	168,304	73,932
Percentage	69.5%	30.5%
- County results Westmoreland: 50–60% 60–70% 70–80% 80–90%
U.S. Representative before election
Lynn Westmoreland
Republican
Elected U.S. Representative
Lynn Westmoreland
Republican

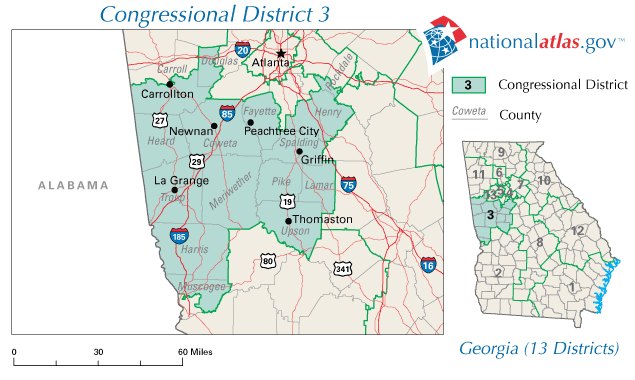
Georgia's 3rd congressional district in 2010

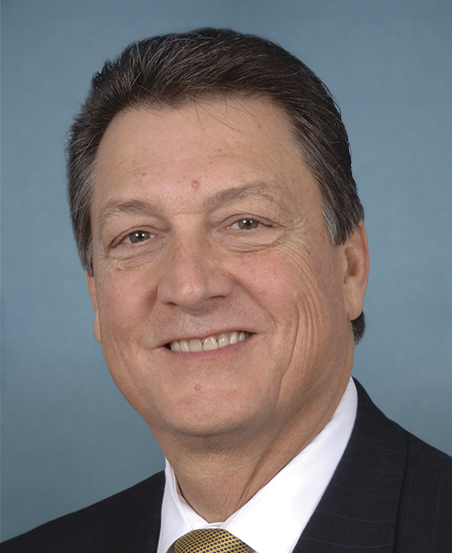
Lynn Westmoreland, who was re-elected as the U.S. representative for the 3rd district

The 3rd district included Newnan, Peachtree City and part of Columbus. The district's population was 70 percent white and 23 percent black (see Race and ethnicity in the United States census); 85 percent were high school graduates and 24 percent had received a bachelor's degree or higher. Its median income was $56,489. In the 2008 presidential election the district gave 64 percent of its vote to Republican nominee John McCain and 35 percent to Democratic nominee Barack Obama.

Republican Lynn Westmoreland, who took office in 2005, was the incumbent. Westmoreland was re-elected in 2008 with 66 percent of the vote. In April 2009, Westmoreland's press secretary said the congressman was considering running for Governor of Georgia; however later that month he said he would instead seek re-election. In 2010 Westmoreland's opponent in the general election was Democratic nominee Frank Saunders, a schoolteacher. Jagdish Agrawal also ran as a write-in candidate. Westmoreland and Saunders were unopposed in their respective primaries.

Westmoreland raised $785,044 and spent $712,529. Saunders raised $44,112 and spent $43,282. Prior to the election FiveThirtyEight's forecast gave Westmoreland a 100 percent chance of winning and projected that he would receive 70 percent of the vote to Saunders's 27 percent. On election day Westmoreland was re-elected with 69 to Saunders's 31 percent. Westmoreland was again re-elected in 2012 and 2014. He did not seek re-election in 2016 and was succeeded by fellow Republican Drew Ferguson.

=== Predictions ===
Source	Ranking	As of
The Cook Political Report	Safe R	November 1, 2010
Rothenberg	Safe R	November 1, 2010
Sabato's Crystal Ball	Safe R	November 1, 2010
RCP	Safe R	November 1, 2010
CQ Politics	Safe R	October 28, 2010
New York Times	Safe R	November 1, 2010
FiveThirtyEight	Safe R	November 1, 2010

=== General election results ===
Georgia's 3rd district general election, November 2, 2010
Party	Candidate	Votes	%
Republican	Lynn Westmoreland (incumbent)	168,304	69.48
Democratic	Frank Saunders	73,932	30.52
Write-In	Jagdish Agrawal	3	0.00
Total votes		242,239	100.00

=== External links ===
- "Frank Saunders campaign website". Archived from the original on October 12, 2010.
- "Lynn Westmoreland campaign website". Archived from the original on October 28, 2010.

== District 4 ==
2010 Georgia's 4th congressional district election
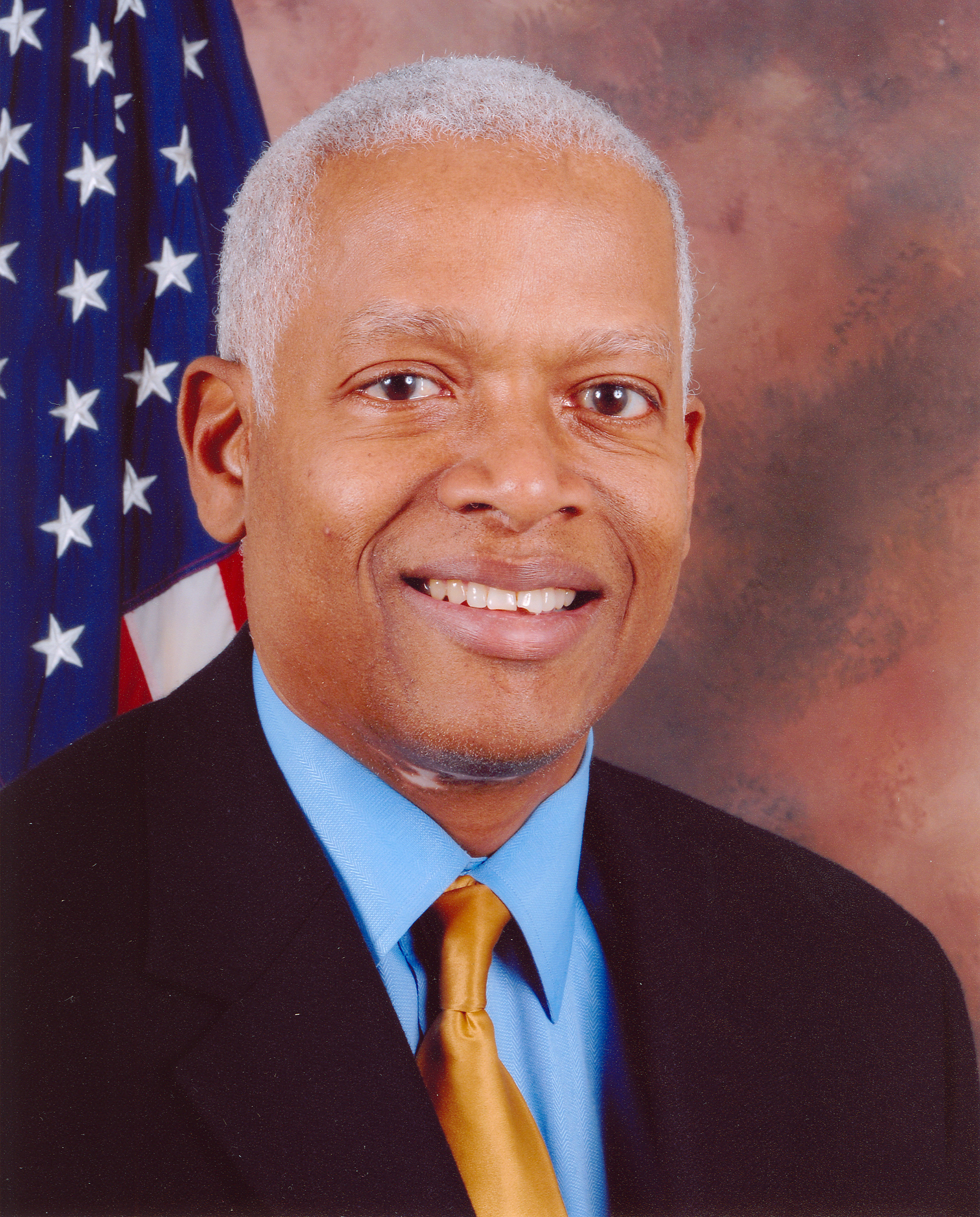

Nominee	Hank Johnson	Lisbeth Carter
Party	Democratic	Republican
Popular vote	131,760	44,707
Percentage	74.7%	25.3%
- County results Johnson: 50–60% 70–80%
U.S. Representative before election
Hank Johnson
Democratic
Elected U.S. Representative
Hank Johnson
Democratic

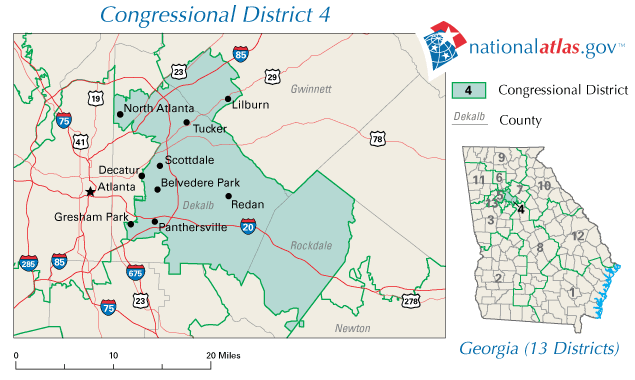
Georgia's 4th congressional district in 2010

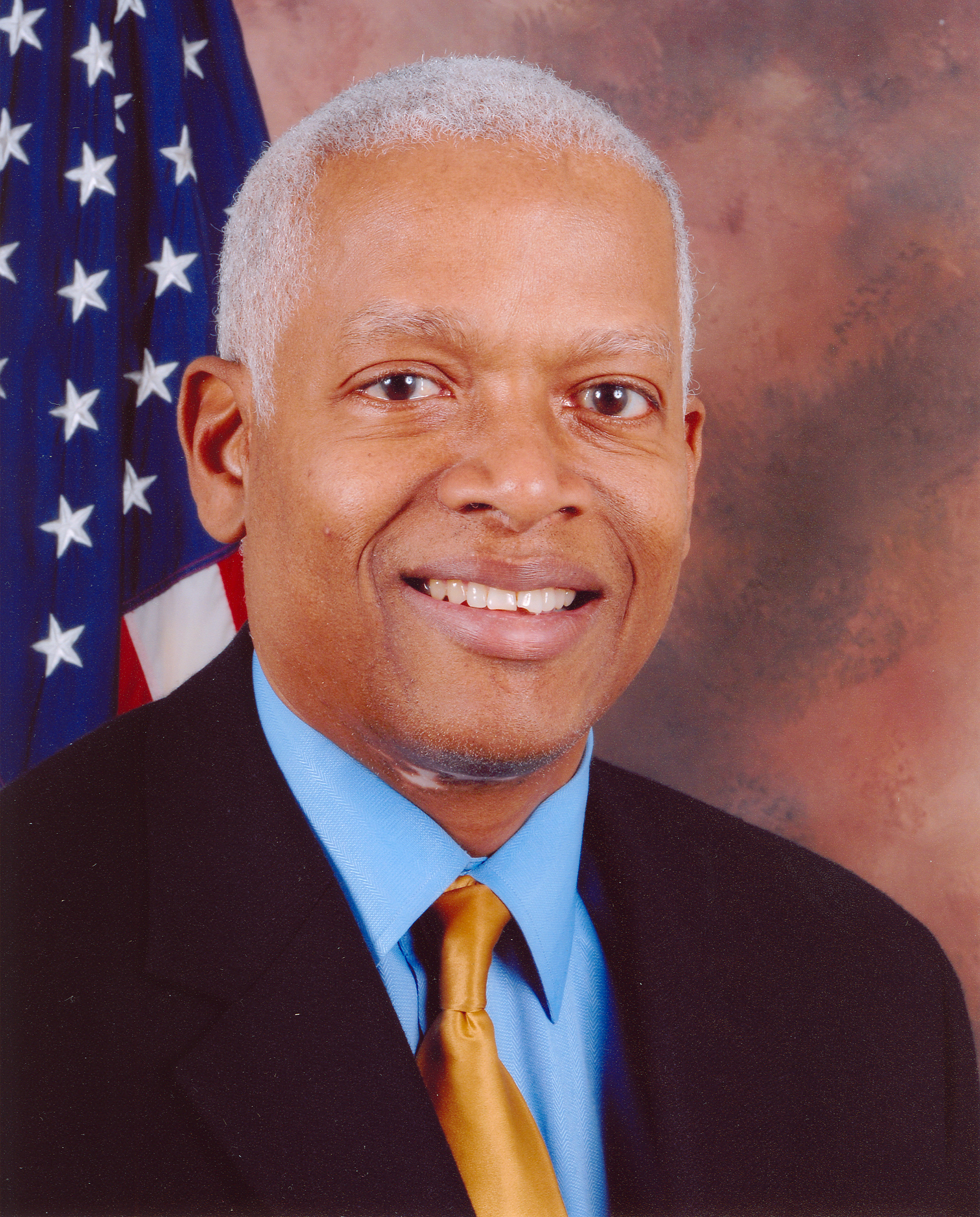
Hank Johnson, who was re-elected as the U.S. representative for the 4th district

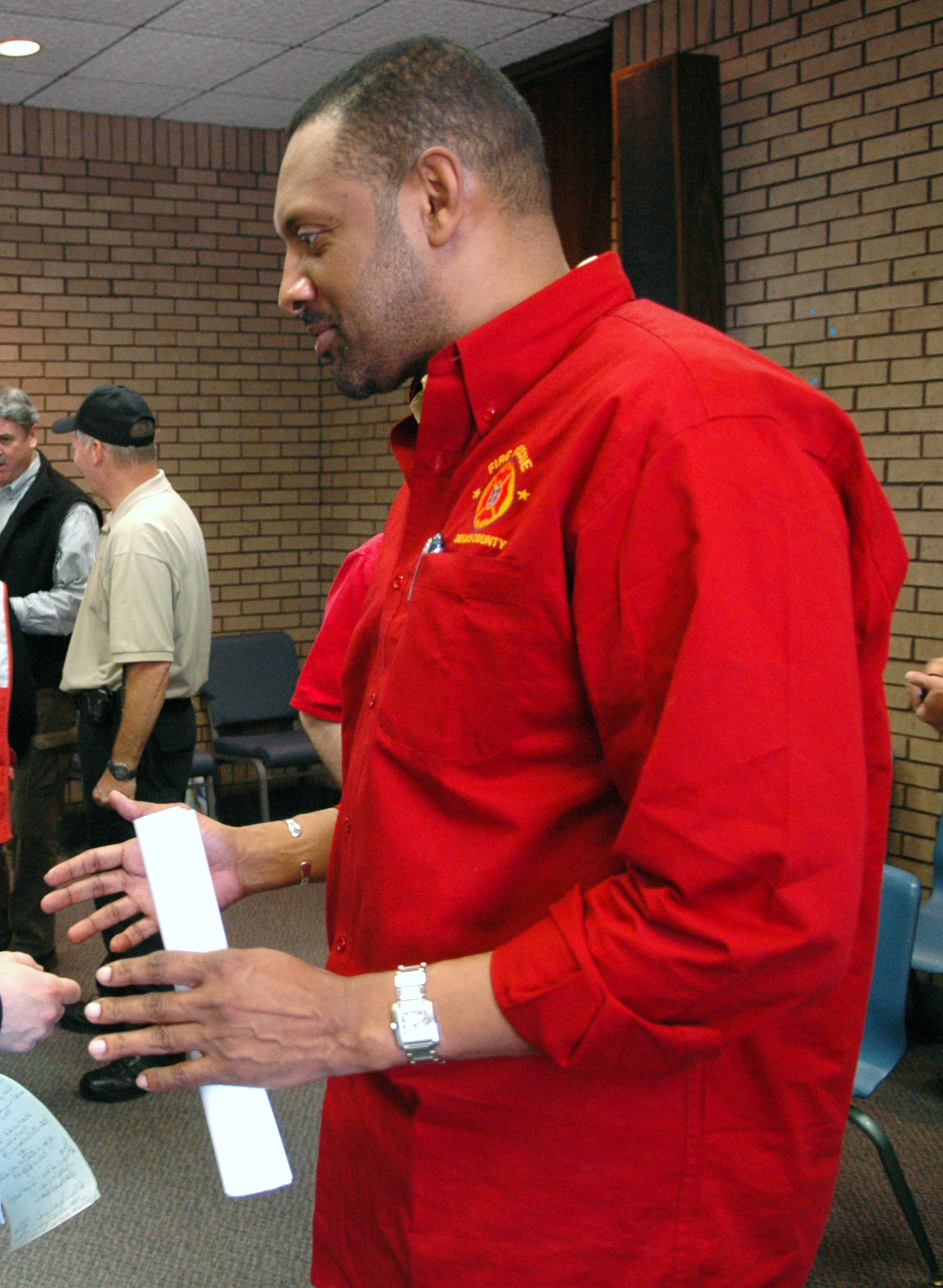
Vernon Jones, who also sought the Democratic nomination in the 4th district

The 4th district included North Atlanta, Redan and Tucker. The district's population was 55 percent black, 24 percent white, 15 percent Hispanic and 5 percent Asian (see Race and ethnicity in the United States census); 84 percent were high school graduates and 30 percent had received a bachelor's degree or higher. Its median income was $50,222. In the 2008 presidential election the district gave 79 percent of its vote to Democratic nominee Barack Obama and 20 percent to Republican nominee John McCain.

Democrat Hank Johnson, who took office in 2007, was the incumbent. Johnson was re-elected unopposed in 2008. In 2010 Johnson's opponent in the general election was Republican nominee Lisbeth Carter, a consultant. Vernon Jones, the former chief executive officer of DeKalb County; and Connie Stokes, a DeKalb County Commissioner, also sought the Democratic nomination. Lee May, also a DeKalb County Commissioner, announced in February 2010 that he would not run in the Democratic primary. In a poll of 400 likely Democratic primary voters, conducted by Lake Research Partners for Johnson's campaign between January 14 and 20, 2010, Johnson led with 47 percent to Jones's 19 percent while Stokes had the support of 12 percent, 5 percent favored May, and 15 percent were undecided. Victor Armendariz, a publishing salesman; Larry Gause, a retired officer in the U.S. Navy; and Cory Ruth, an information security manager, also sought the Republican nomination.

Johnson raised $581,545 and spent $589,780. Carter raised $118,102 and spent the same amount. Jones raised $73,225 and spent $74,405. Stokes raised $78,668 and spent $78,629. Gause raised $3,997 and spent $2,931. Ruth raised $12,626 and spent $12,398.

Prior to the election FiveThirtyEight's forecast gave Johnson a 100 percent chance of winning and projected that he would receive 74 percent of the vote to Carter's 23 percent. On election day Johnson was re-elected with 75 percent of the vote to Carter's 25 percent. Johnson was again re-elected in 2012, 2014, 2016 and 2018.

=== Democratic primary results ===
Georgia's 4th district Democratic primary, July 20, 2010
Party	Candidate	Votes	%
Democratic	Hank Johnson (incumbent)	28,095	55.18
Democratic	Vernon Jones	13,407	26.33
Democratic	Connie Stokes	9,411	18.48
Total votes		50,913	100.00

=== Republican primary results ===
Georgia's 4th district Republican primary, July 20, 2010
Party	Candidate	Votes	%
Republican	Lisbeth Carter	9,549	54.75
Republican	Larry Gause	4,455	25.54
Republican	Victor Armendariz	1,741	9.98
Republican	Cory Ruth	1,697	9.73
Total votes		17,442	100.00

==== Predictions ====
Source	Ranking	As of
The Cook Political Report	Safe D	November 1, 2010
Rothenberg	Safe D	November 1, 2010
Sabato's Crystal Ball	Safe D	November 1, 2010
RCP	Safe D	November 1, 2010
CQ Politics	Safe D	October 28, 2010
New York Times	Safe D	November 1, 2010
FiveThirtyEight	Safe D	November 1, 2010

=== General election results ===
Georgia's 4th district general election, November 2, 2010
Party	Candidate	Votes	%
Democratic	Hank Johnson (incumbent)	131,760	74.67
Republican	Lisbeth Carter	44,707	25.33
Total votes		176,467	100.00

=== External links ===
- "Victor Armendariz campaign website". Archived from the original on July 23, 2010.
- "Lisbeth Carter campaign website". Archived from the original on November 1, 2010.
- "Larry Gause campaign website". Archived from the original on February 22, 2010.
- "Hank Johnson campaign website". Archived from the original on October 28, 2010.

== District 5 ==
2010 Georgia's 5th congressional district election
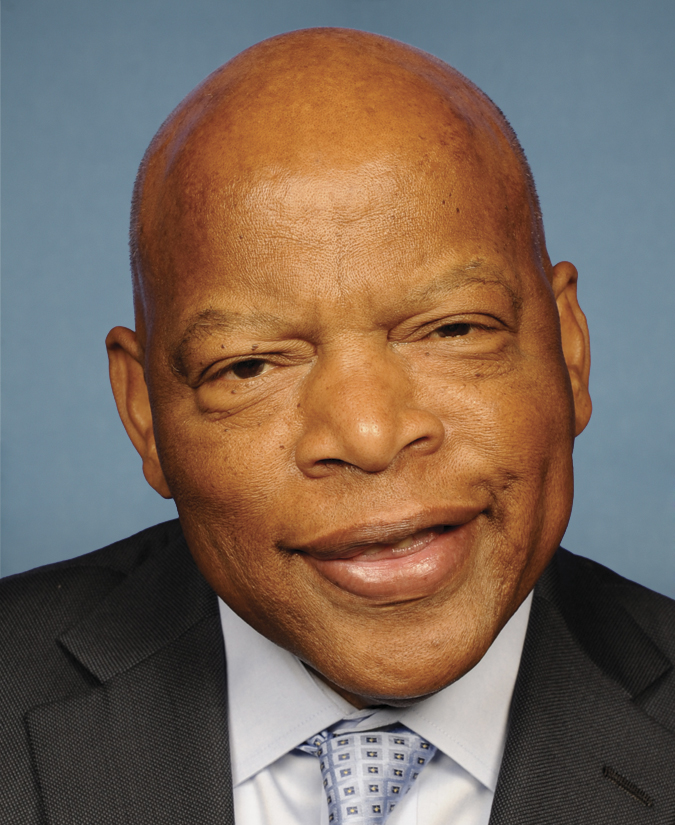

Nominee	John Lewis	Fenn Little
Party	Democratic	Republican
Popular vote	130,782	46,622
Percentage	73.7%	26.3%
- County results Lewis: 70–80% 80–90%
U.S. Representative before election
John Lewis
Democratic
Elected U.S. Representative
John Lewis
Democratic

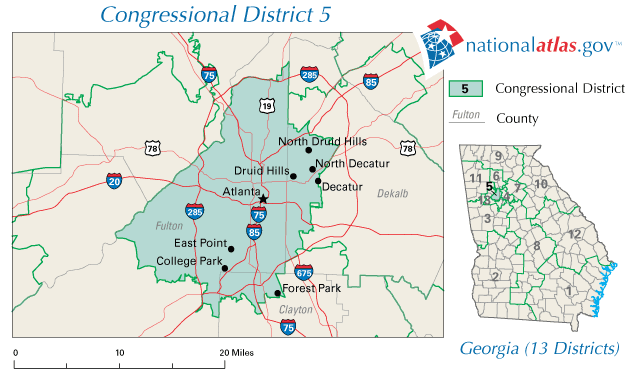
Georgia's 5th congressional district in 2010

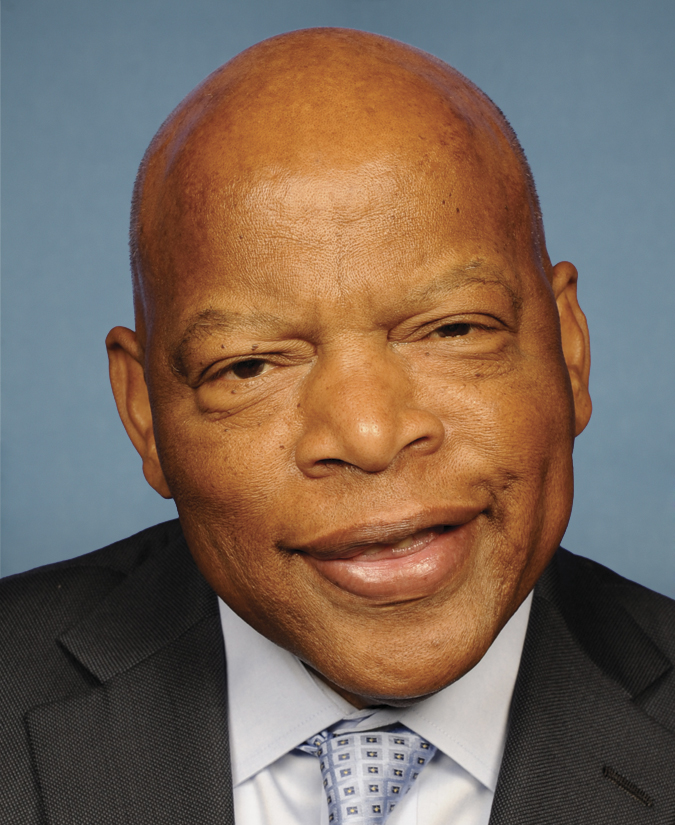
John Lewis, who was re-elected as the U.S. representative for the 5th district

The 5th district included Atlanta and parts of East Point and Sandy Springs. The district's population was 50 percent black, 38 percent white and 8 percent Hispanic (see Race and ethnicity in the United States census); 85 percent were high school graduates and 43 percent had received a bachelor's degree or higher. Its median income was $50,072. In the 2008 presidential election the district gave 79 percent of its vote to Democratic nominee Barack Obama and 20 percent to Republican nominee John McCain.

Democrat John Lewis was the incumbent. Lewis was re-elected unopposed in 2008. In 2010 Lewis's opponent in the general election was Fenn Little, a civil rights attorney and small business owner. Kelly Nguyen, a graphic artist, also sought the Republican nomination.

Lewis raised $1,013,992 and spent $1,115,868. Little raised $107,759 and spent $92,206. Nguyen raised $13,433 and spent $14,436.

Prior to the election FiveThirtyEight's forecast gave Lewis a 100 percent chance of winning and projected that he would receive 75 percent of the vote to Little's 22 percent. On election day Lewis was re-elected with 74 percent of the vote to Little's 26 percent. Lewis was again re-elected in 2012, 2014, 2016 and 2018.

=== Republican primary results ===
Georgia's 5th district Republican primary, July 20, 2010
Party	Candidate	Votes	%
Republican	Fenn Little	8,758	59.60
Republican	Kelly Nguyen	5,937	40.40
Total votes		14,695	100.00

==== Predictions ====
Source	Ranking	As of
The Cook Political Report	Safe D	November 1, 2010
Rothenberg	Safe D	November 1, 2010
Sabato's Crystal Ball	Safe D	November 1, 2010
RCP	Safe D	November 1, 2010
CQ Politics	Safe D	October 28, 2010
New York Times	Safe D	November 1, 2010
FiveThirtyEight	Safe D	November 1, 2010

=== General election results ===
Georgia's 5th district general election, November 2, 2010
Party	Candidate	Votes	%
Democratic	John Lewis (incumbent)	130,782	73.72
Republican	Fenn Little	46,622	26.28
Total votes		177,404	100.00

=== External links ===
- "John Lewis campaign website". Archived from the original on April 17, 2014.
- "Fenn Little campaign website". Archived from the original on October 28, 2010.
- "Kelly Nguyen campaign website". Archived from the original on August 22, 2010.

== District 6 ==
2010 Georgia's 6th congressional district election
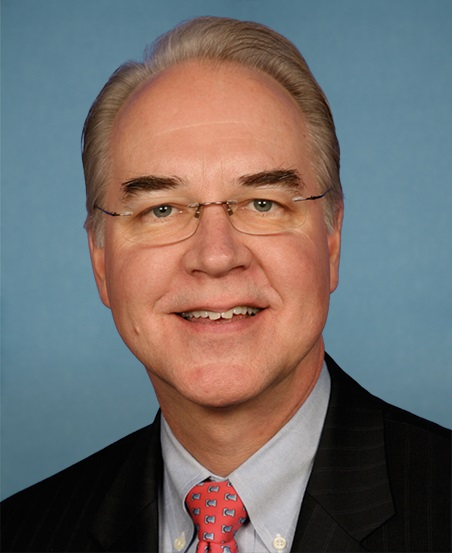

Nominee	Tom Price	Sean Greenberg
Party	Republican	Write-In
Popular vote	198,100	188
Percentage	99.9%	0.1%
- County results Price: 90–100% 100–100%
U.S. Representative before election
Tom Price
Republican
Elected U.S. Representative
Tom Price
Republican

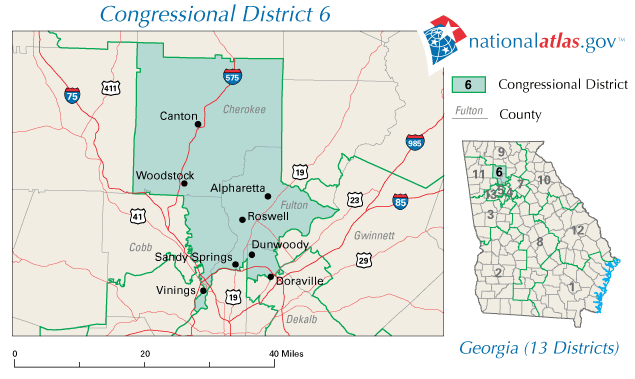
Georgia's 6th congressional district in 2010

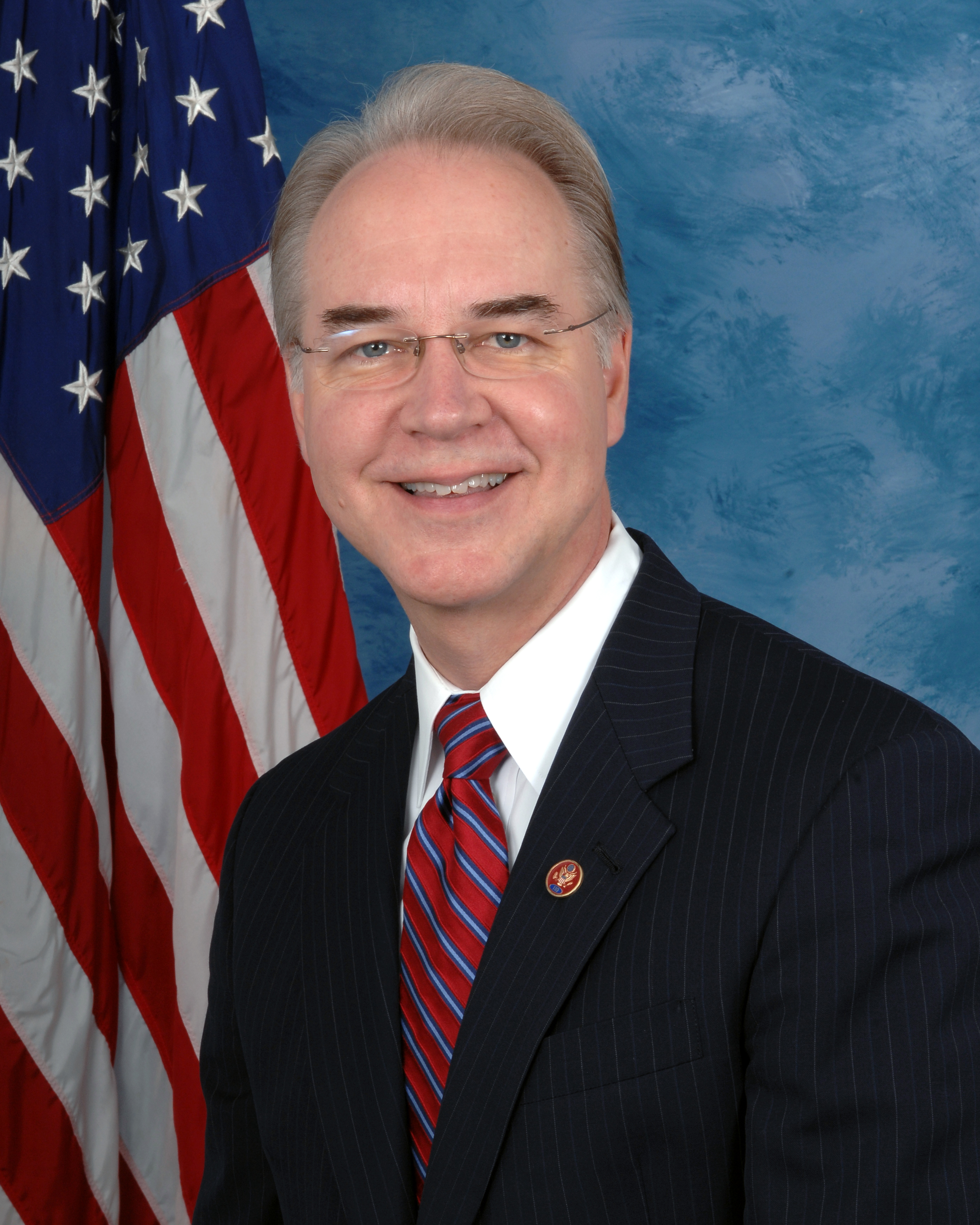
Tom Price, who was re-elected as the U.S. representative for the 6th district

The 6th district included Alpharetta, Dunwoody, Johns Creek, Roswell and part of Sandy Springs. The district's population was 74 percent white, 9 percent black, 9 percent Hispanic and 6 percent Asian (see Race and ethnicity in the United States census); 94 percent were high school graduates and 53 percent had received a bachelor's degree or higher. Its median income was $82,593. In the 2008 presidential election the district gave 63 percent of its vote to Republican nominee John McCain and 35 percent to Democratic nominee Barack Obama.

Republican Tom Price, who took office in 2005, was the incumbent. Price was re-elected in 2008 with 69 percent of the vote. In 2010 Price was the only candidate on the ballot in the 6th district; however, write-in candidate Sean Greenberg, a bartender, also ran.

Price raised $2,070,230 and spent $1,218,835. Prior to the election FiveThirtyEight's forecast gave Price a 100 percent chance of winning. On election day Price was re-elected with 100 percent of the vote. Price was again re-elected in 2012, 2014 and 2016, and remained in office until February 2017, when he was confirmed as U.S. Secretary of Health and Human Services, a position from which he resigned in September 2017. He was succeeded by fellow Republican Karen Handel.

=== Predictions ===
Source	Ranking	As of
The Cook Political Report	Safe R	November 1, 2010
Rothenberg	Safe R	November 1, 2010
Sabato's Crystal Ball	Safe R	November 1, 2010
RCP	Safe R	November 1, 2010
CQ Politics	Safe R	October 28, 2010
New York Times	Safe R	November 1, 2010
FiveThirtyEight	Safe R	November 1, 2010

=== General election results ===
Georgia's 6th district general election, November 2, 2010
Party	Candidate	Votes	%
Republican	Tom Price (incumbent)	198,100	99.91
Write-In	Sean Greenberg	188	0.09
Total votes		198,288	100.00

=== External links ===
- "Tom Price campaign website". Archived from the original on October 28, 2010.

== District 7 ==
2010 Georgia's 7th congressional district election
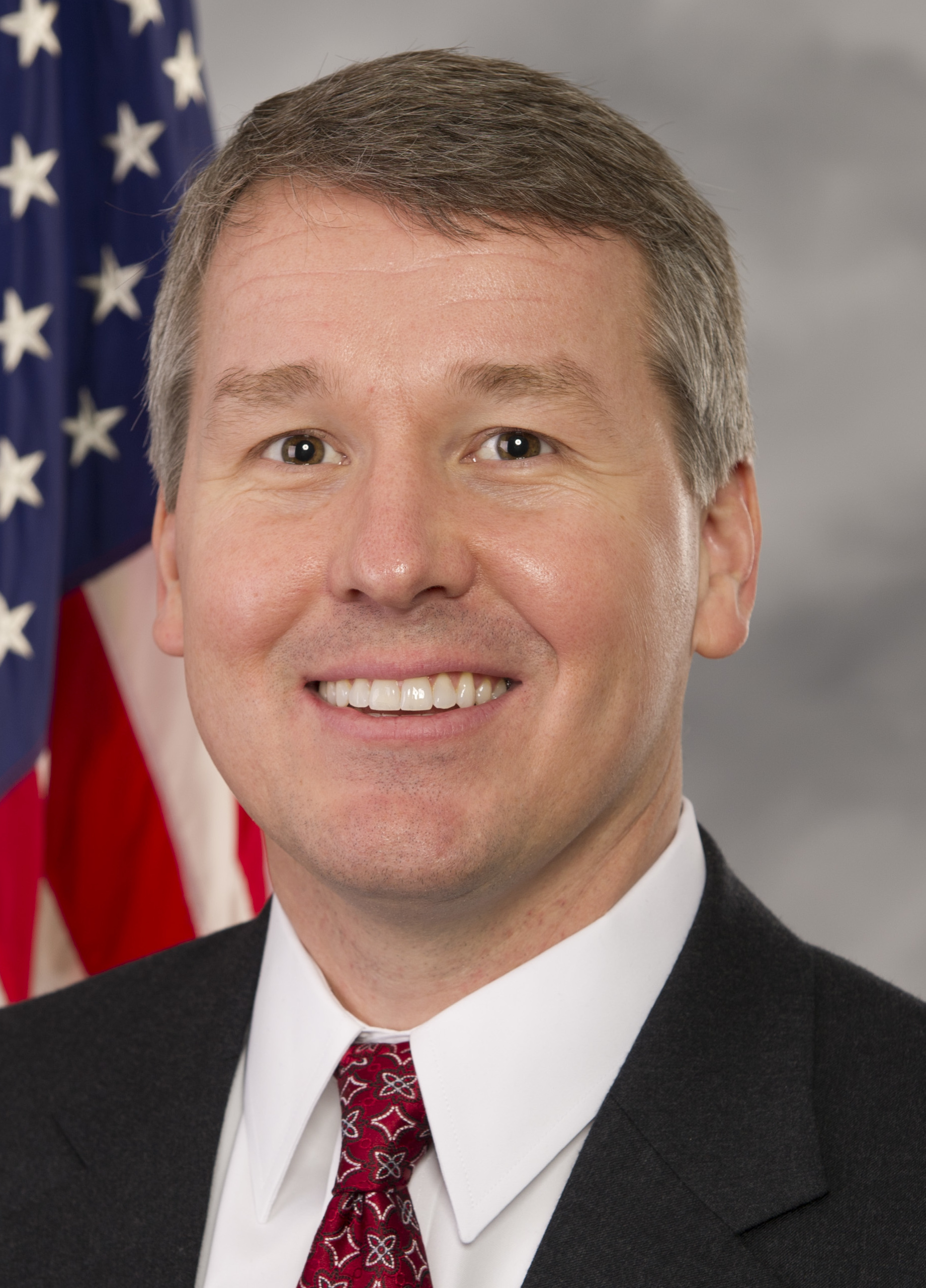

Nominee	Rob Woodall	Doug Heckman
Party	Republican	Democratic
Popular vote	160,898	78,996
Percentage	67.1%	32.9%
- County results Woodall: 60–70% 70–80% 80–90% Heckman: 50–60%
U.S. Representative before election
John Linder
Republican
Elected U.S. Representative
Rob Woodall
Republican

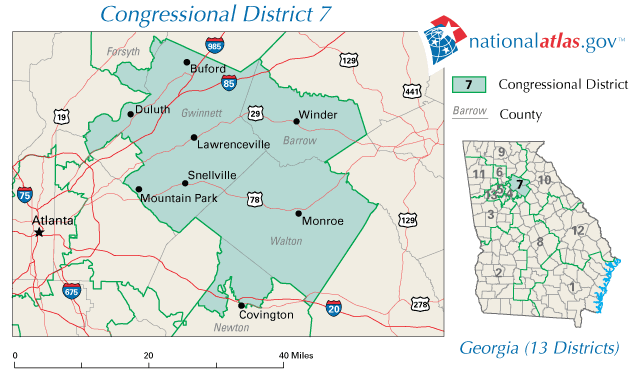
Georgia's 7th congressional district in 2010

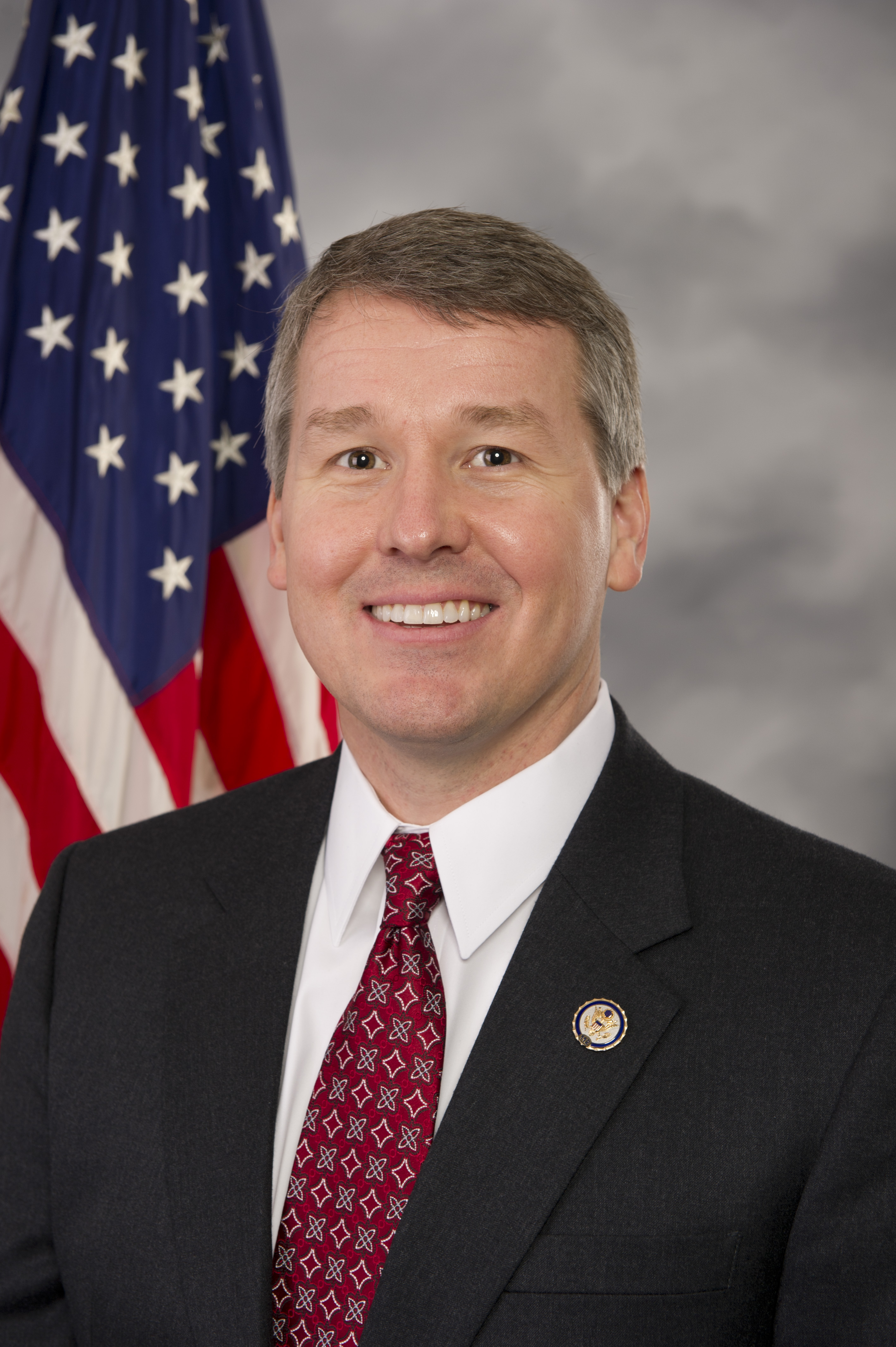
Rob Woodall, who was elected as the U.S. representative for the 7th district

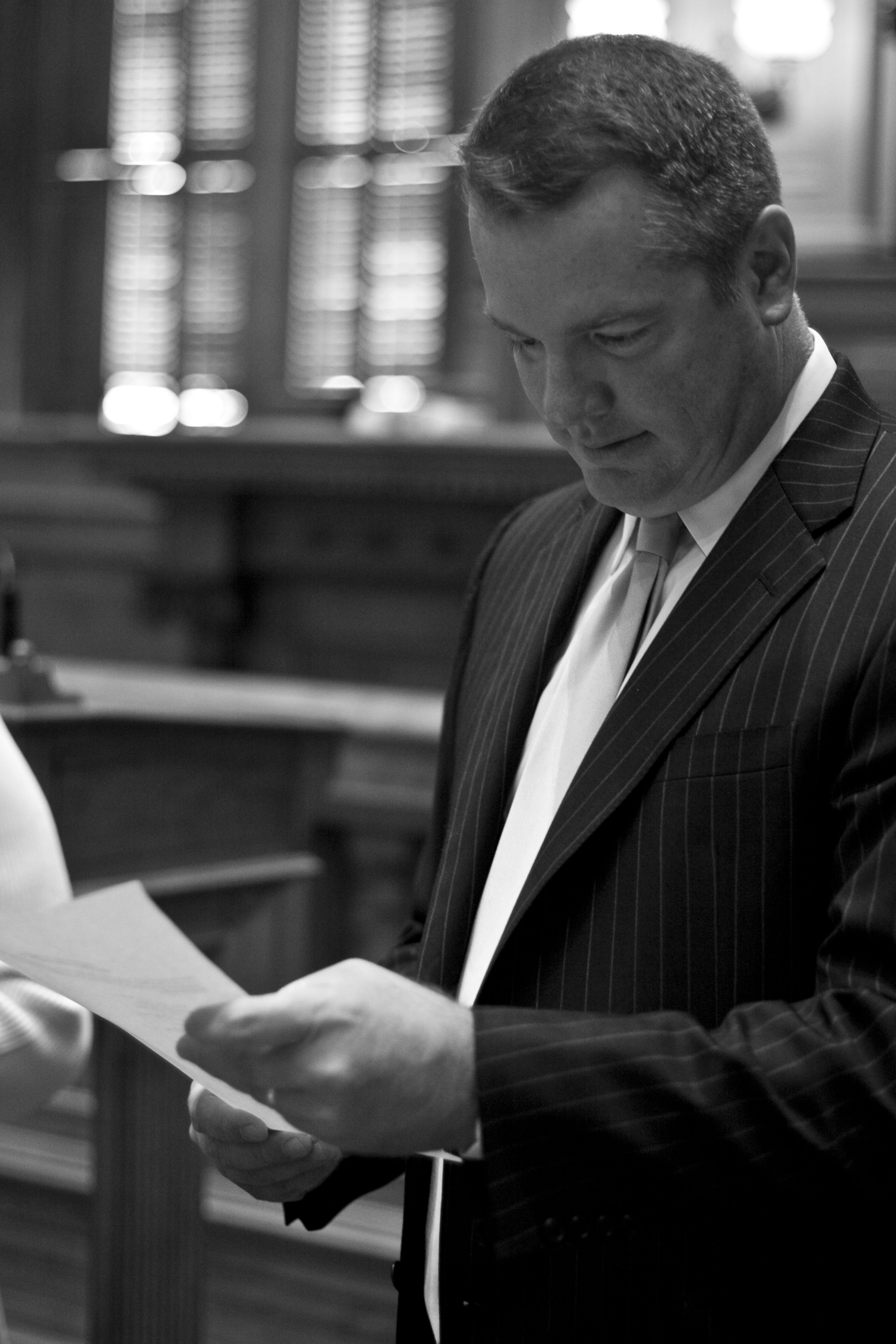
Doug Heckman, who also ran in the 7th district

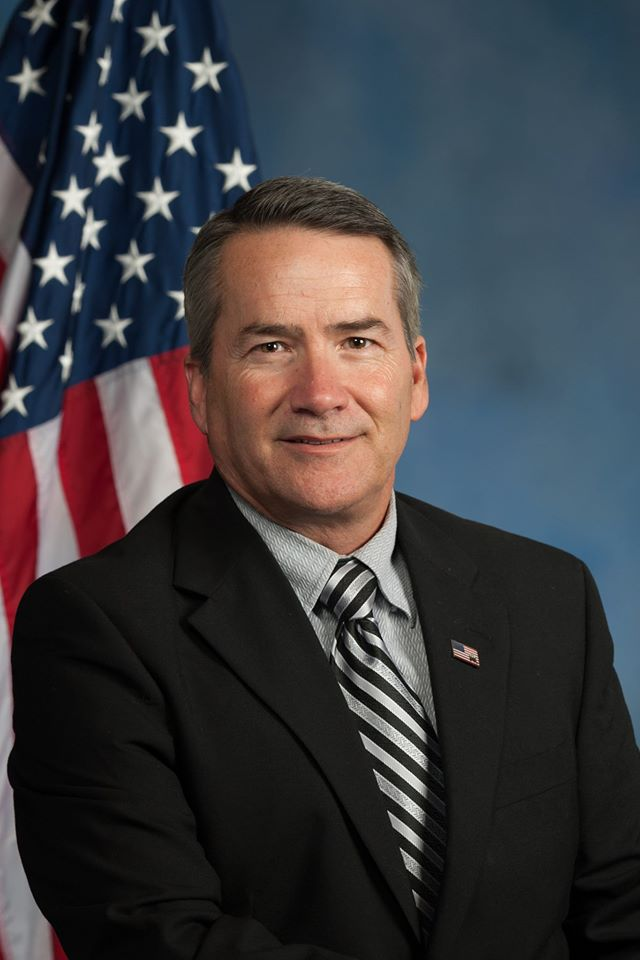
Jody Hice, who also sought the Republican nomination in the 7th district

The 7th district included Duluth and Lawrenceville. The district's population was 60 percent white, 19 percent black, 11 percent Hispanic and 8 percent Asian (see Race and ethnicity in the United States census); 87 percent were high school graduates and 34 percent had received a bachelor's degree or higher. Its median income was $67,059. In the 2008 presidential election the district gave 60 percent of its vote to Republican nominee John McCain and 39 percent to Democratic nominee Barack Obama.

Republican John Linder, who took office in 1993, was the incumbent. Linder was re-elected in 2008 with 62 percent of the vote. In 2010 Linder retired rather than seeking re-election. The candidates in the general election were Republican nominee Rob Woodall, Linder's former chief of staff; and Democratic nominee Doug Heckman, a financial services manager. Clay Cox, a member of the Georgia House of Representatives; Chuck Efstration, an assistant district attorney in Gwinnett County; Jef Fincher, a small business owner and flight attendant; Ronnie Grist, a retired employee of the state government; Jody Hice, a radio talk show host and former pastor; Tom Kirby, a human resource safety manager; and Tom Parrott, a salesman and former accountant, also sought the Republican nomination.

In February 2010, a consultant for Karen Handel, a former Secretary of State of Georgia, said Handel would not seek the Republican nomination in the 7th district and would instead remain a candidate in the gubernatorial election. The same month John Smoltz, a former Atlanta Braves pitcher, said he would not seek the Republican nomination. In March 2010, Ralph Reed, the former executive director of the Christian Coalition of America, said he would not run. David Shafer, a member of the Georgia State Senate who had considered seeking the Republican nomination, announced in March 2010 that he would not run. Don Balfour, also a member of the State Senate, announced that he would run in March 2010, but later that month ended his campaign.

Woodall and Hice advanced to the primary runoff election. In a poll of the runoff, conducted on August 28, 2010, by Landmark Communications, Inc. (LCI) with a sample size of 789, Woodall led with 47 percent to Hice's 32 percent while 20 percent were undecided. Heckman was unopposed in the Democratic primary.

Woodall raised $399,086 and spent $323,801. Heckman raised $81,220 and spent $73,899. Cox raised $287,336 and spent $286,474. Efstration raised $56,214 and spent $54,102. Fincher raised $33,100 and spent the same amount. Hice raised $279,017 and spent $278,566. Kirby raised $5,925 and spent $8,122. Parrott raised $17,475 and spent $14,515.

In a poll of 1,070 likely voters, conducted by LCI on October 25, 2010, Woodall led with 60 percent to Heckman's 30 percent. Prior to the election FiveThirtyEight's forecast gave Woodall a 100 percent chance of winning and projected that he would receive 68 percent of the vote to Heckman's 32 percent. On election day Woodall was elected with 67 percent of the vote to Heckman's 33 percent. Woodall was re-elected in 2012, 2014, 2016 and 2018. Hice was elected as the U.S. representative for the 10th district in 2014 and was re-elected in 2016 and 2018.

=== Republican primary results ===
Georgia's 7th district Republican primary, July 20, 2010
Party	Candidate	Votes	%
Republican	Rob Woodall	26,374	34.64
Republican	Jody Hice	20,034	26.31
Republican	Clay Cox	15,249	20.03
Republican	Jef Fincher	4,608	6.05
Republican	Tom Kirby	3,052	4.01
Republican	Chuck Efstration	2,837	3.73
Republican	Tom Parrott	1,648	2.16
Republican	Ronnie Grist	1,083	1.42
Total votes		76,145	100.00

=== Republican primary runoff results ===
Georgia's 7th district Republican primary runoff, August 10, 2010
Party	Candidate	Votes	%
Republican	Rob Woodall	39,987	55.99
Republican	Jody Hice	31,426	44.01
Total votes		71,413	100.00

==== Predictions ====
Source	Ranking	As of
The Cook Political Report	Safe R	November 1, 2010
Rothenberg	Safe R	November 1, 2010
Sabato's Crystal Ball	Safe R	November 1, 2010
RCP	Safe R	November 1, 2010
CQ Politics	Safe R	October 28, 2010
New York Times	Safe R	November 1, 2010
FiveThirtyEight	Safe R	November 1, 2010

=== General election results ===
Georgia's 7th district general election, November 2, 2010
Party	Candidate	Votes	%
Republican	Rob Woodall	160,898	67.07
Democratic	Doug Heckman	78,996	32.93
Total votes		239,894	100.00

=== External links ===
- "Clay Cox campaign website". Archived from the original on June 20, 2010.
- "Chuck Efstration campaign website". Archived from the original on October 27, 2010.
- "Jef Fincher campaign website". Archived from the original on May 3, 2010.
- "Ronnie Grist campaign website". Archived from the original on October 24, 2010.
- "Doug Heckman campaign website". Archived from the original on October 28, 2010.
- "Jody Hice campaign website". Archived from the original on October 18, 2010.
- "Rob Woodall campaign website". Archived from the original on November 1, 2010.

== District 8 ==
2010 Georgia's 8th congressional district election
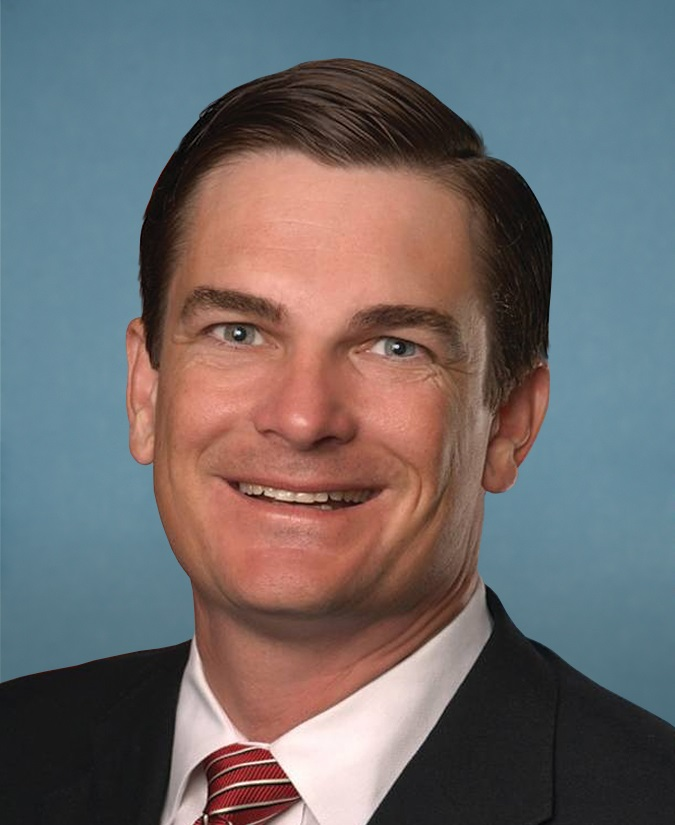

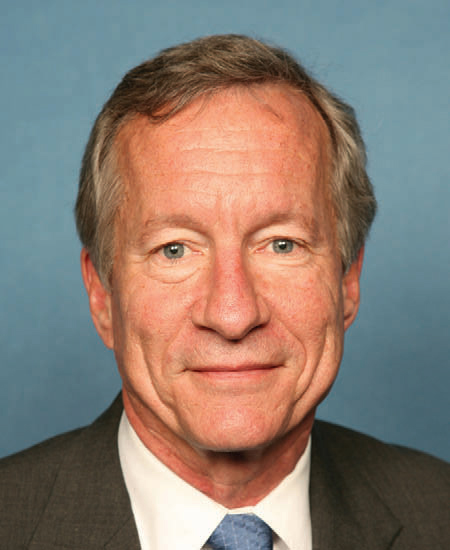
Nominee	Austin Scott	Jim Marshall
Party	Republican	Democratic
Popular vote	102,770	92,250
Percentage	52.7%	47.3%
- County results Scott: 50–60% 60–70% 70–80% Marshall: 50–60% 60–70%
U.S. Representative before election
Jim Marshall
Democratic
Elected U.S. Representative
Austin Scott
Republican

The 8th district included Macon and part of Warner Robins. The district's population was 61 percent white and 33 percent black (see Race and ethnicity in the United States census); 79 percent were high school graduates and 18 percent had received a bachelor's degree or higher. Its median income was $42,697. In the 2008 presidential election the district gave 56 percent of its vote to Republican nominee John McCain and 43 percent to Democratic nominee Barack Obama. In 2010 the district had a Cook Partisan Voting Index of R+10.

Democrat Jim Marshall, who took office in 2003, was the incumbent. Marshall was re-elected in 2008 with 57 percent of the vote. In 2010 Marshall's opponent in the general election was Republican nominee Austin Scott, a member of the Georgia House of Representatives. Marshall was unopposed in the Democratic primary. Ken DeLoach, a school administrator; and Diane Vann, a former nurse, also sought the Republican nomination. Paul Rish, the former head of the Bibb County Republican Party, ended his campaign in April 2010. Angela Hicks, a businesswoman, ended her campaign for the Republican nomination in May 2010.

Marshall raised $1,496,152 and spent $1,814,549. Scott raised $1,035,300 and spent $1,024,631. DeLoach raised $30,941 and spent the same amount. Vann raised no money and spent $17,293. Hicks raised $78,171 and spent the same amount.

In a poll conducted by American Viewpoint (AV) for Scott's campaign in late July 2010, Marshall led with 44 percent to Scott's 39 percent. A poll of 400 likely voters, conducted by Grove Insight for the Democratic Congressional Campaign Committee between September 13 and 15, 2010, Marshall led with 48 percent to Scott's 36 percent. An AV poll of 300 likely voters, conducted on September 26 and 27, 2010, and released by Scott's campaign, found Scott leading with 46 percent to Marshall's 38 percent. In a poll of 400 likely voters, conducted by the Mellman Group between October 17 and 19, 2010, 47 percent of respondents supported Marshall while 44 percent favored Scott and 9 percent were undecided. A poll conducted by Landmark Communications, Inc. (LCI) on October 19, 2010, with a sample size of 763, found Scott leading with 54 percent to Marshall's 35 percent, while 14 percent were undecided. In a poll of 400 likely voters, conducted by Penn Schoen Berland between October 19 and 21, 2010, Scott led with 50 percent to Marshall's 37 percent while 10 percent were undecided. In a poll of 1,133 likely voters, conducted by LCI on October 26, 2010, Scott led with 53 percent to Marshall's 39 percent.

On election day, Scott was elected with 53 percent of the vote to Marshall's 47 percent. Scott was re-elected in 2012, 2014, 2016 and 2018. In 2012 Marshall became president and chief executive officer of the United States Institute of Peace, stepping down in January 2014.

=== Republican primary results ===
Georgia's 8th district Republican primary, July 20, 2010
Party	Candidate	Votes	%
Republican	Austin Scott	22,191	52.36
Republican	Ken DeLoach	13,228	31.21
Republican	Diane Vann	6,959	16.42
Total votes		42,378	100.00

==== Predictions ====
Source	Ranking	As of
The Cook Political Report	Lean R (flip)	November 1, 2010
Rothenberg	Lean R (flip)	November 1, 2010
Sabato's Crystal Ball	Lean R (flip)	November 1, 2010
RCP	Lean R (flip)	November 1, 2010
CQ Politics	Tossup	October 28, 2010
New York Times	Tossup	November 1, 2010
FiveThirtyEight	Likely R (flip)	November 1, 2010

=== General election results ===
Georgia's 8th district general election, November 2, 2010
Party	Candidate	Votes	%
Republican	Austin Scott	102,770	52.70
Democratic	Jim Marshall (incumbent)	92,250	47.30
Total votes		195,020	100.00

=== External links ===
- "Ken DeLoach campaign website". Archived from the original on October 20, 2010.
- "Jim Marshall campaign website". Archived from the original on October 29, 2010.
- "Austin Scott campaign website". Archived from the original on October 28, 2010.
- "Diane Vann campaign website". Archived from the original on October 26, 2010.

== District 9 ==
2010 Georgia's 9th congressional district election
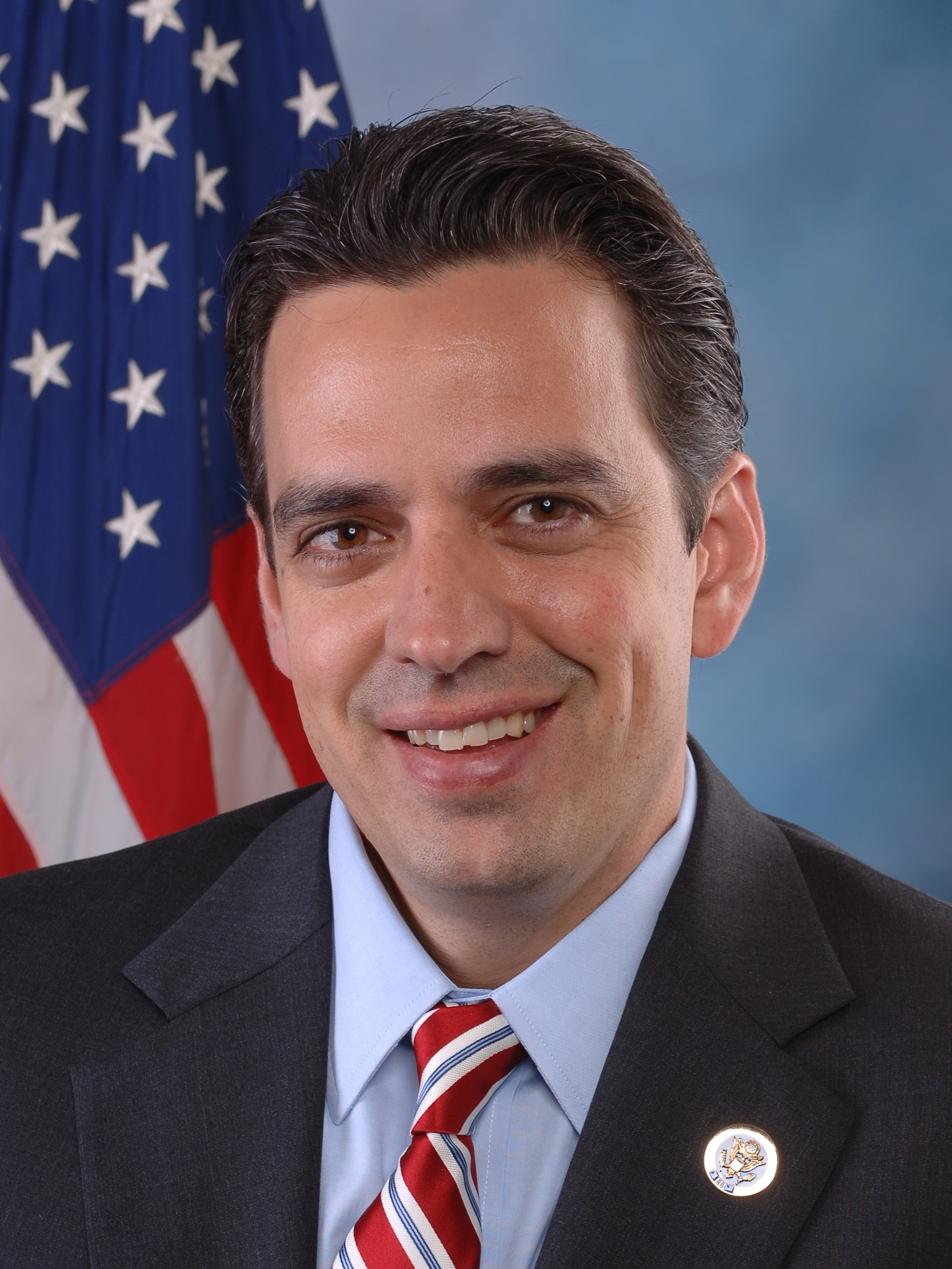
Nominee	Tom Graves
Party	Republican
Popular vote	Unopposed
U.S. Representative before election
Tom Graves
Republican
Elected U.S. Representative
Tom Graves
Republican

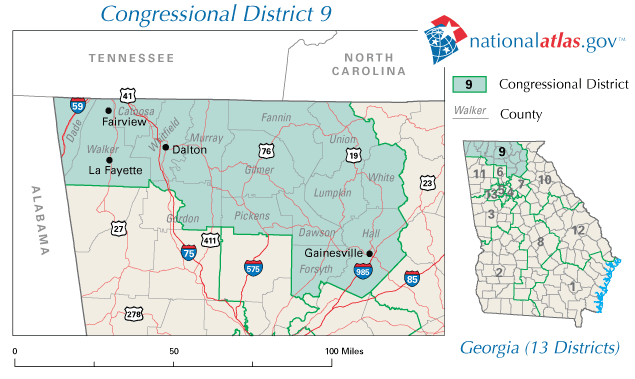
Georgia's 9th congressional district in 2010

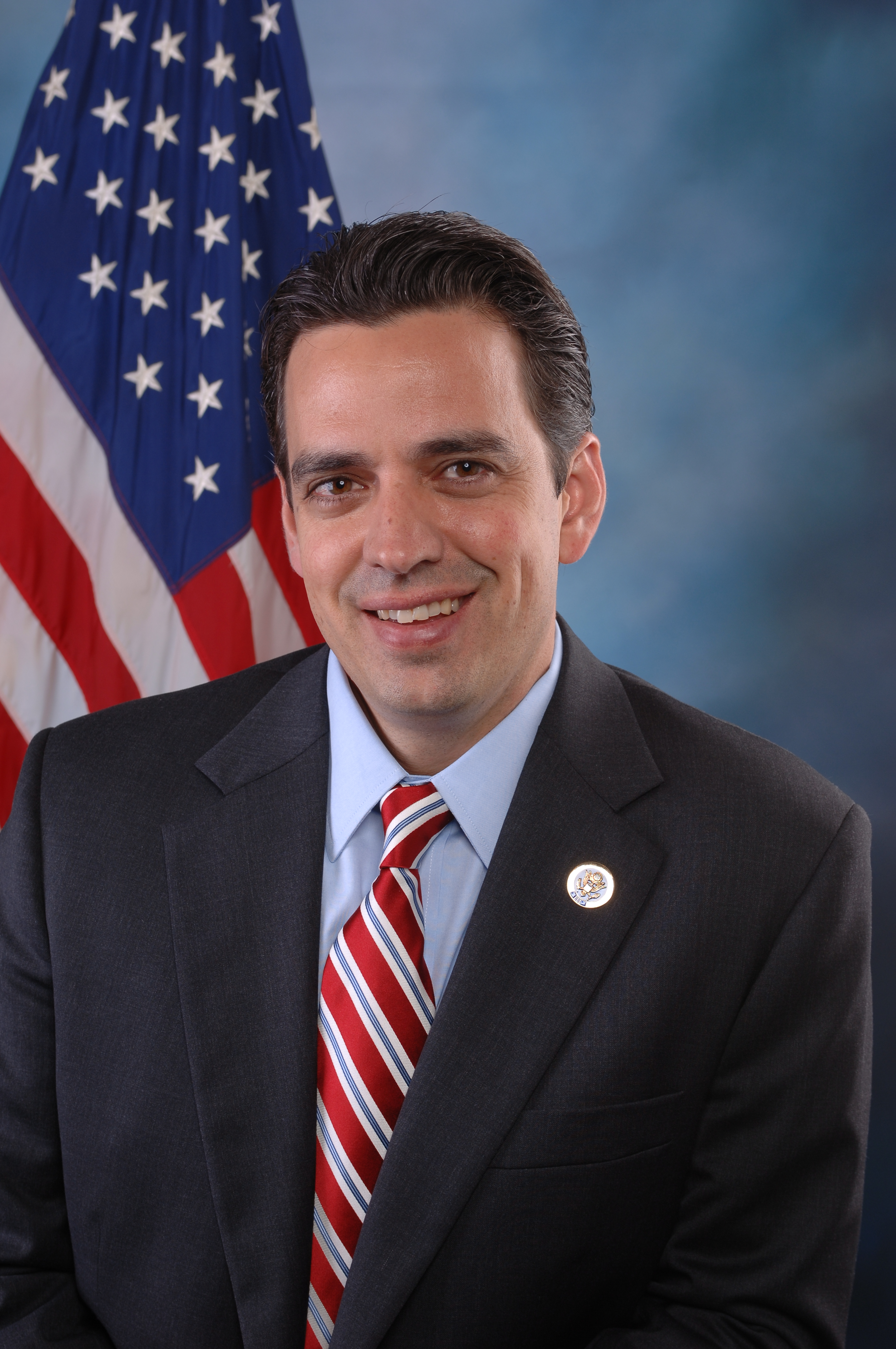
Tom Graves, who was re-elected as the U.S. representative for the 9th district

The 9th district included Dalton and Gainesville. The district's population was 81 percent white and 13 percent Hispanic (see Race and ethnicity in the United States census); 77 percent were high school graduates and 20 percent had received a bachelor's degree or higher. Its median income was $49,065. In the 2008 presidential election the district gave 75 percent of its vote to Republican nominee John McCain and 23 percent to Democratic nominee Barack Obama.

Republican Tom Graves, who was elected in a June 2010 special election, was the incumbent. He succeeded fellow Republican Nathan Deal, who was re-elected with 76 percent of the vote in 2008. In the November 2010 general election, Graves was unopposed for re-election.

Lee Hawkins, a former member of the Georgia State Senate; Bobby Reese, a member of the Georgia House of Representatives; and Steve Tarvin also sought the Republican nomination. Chris Cates and Bert Loftman, a neurosurgeon; withdrew from the race before the primary but remained on the Republican primary ballot. Bill Stephens, the former majority leader of the State Senate, ended his campaign in May 2010. As in the special election, Graves and Hawkins advanced to the primary runoff election, which marked the fourth time the two men faced one another for the seat in 2010. Mike Freeman, a retired pastor, announced in April 2010 that he would not seek the Democratic nomination.

Across both elections, Graves raised $1,312,938 and spent $1,309,824. Hawkins raised $1,025,707 and spent $1,023,928. Reese raised $23,991 and spent $21,076. Tarvin raised $450,327 and spent $447,891. Cates raised $483,218 and spent $482,774. Loftman raised $18,405 and reported spending $-10,190. Stephens raised $114,908 and spent the same amount. Freeman raised $37,973 and spent the same amount. Graves was again re-elected in 2012, 2014, 2016 and 2018.

=== Republican primary results ===
Georgia's 9th district Republican primary, July 20, 2010
Party	Candidate	Votes	%
Republican	Tom Graves (incumbent)	38,851	49.47
Republican	Lee Hawkins	20,957	26.69
Republican	Steve Tarvin	11,529	14.68
Republican	Chris Cates	5,051	6.43
Republican	Bobby Reese	1,362	1.73
Republican	Bert Loftman	782	1.00
Total votes		78,532	100.00

=== Republican primary runoff results ===
Georgia's 9th district Republican primary runoff, August 10, 2010
Party	Candidate	Votes	%
Republican	Tom Graves (incumbent)	41,878	55.21
Republican	Lee Hawkins	33,975	44.79
Total votes		75,853	100.00

==== Predictions ====
Source	Ranking	As of
The Cook Political Report	Safe R	November 1, 2010
Rothenberg	Safe R	November 1, 2010
Sabato's Crystal Ball	Safe R	November 1, 2010
RCP	Safe R	November 1, 2010
CQ Politics	Safe R	October 28, 2010
New York Times	Safe R	November 1, 2010
FiveThirtyEight	Safe R	November 1, 2010

=== External links ===
- "Chris Cates campaign website". Archived from the original on July 26, 2010.
- "Tom Graves campaign website". Archived from the original on November 1, 2010.
- "Lee Hawkins campaign website". Archived from the original on July 15, 2010.
- "Bert Loftman campaign website". Archived from the original on May 14, 2010.
- "Steve Tarvin campaign website". Archived from the original on September 30, 2010.

== District 10 ==
2010 Georgia's 10th congressional district election
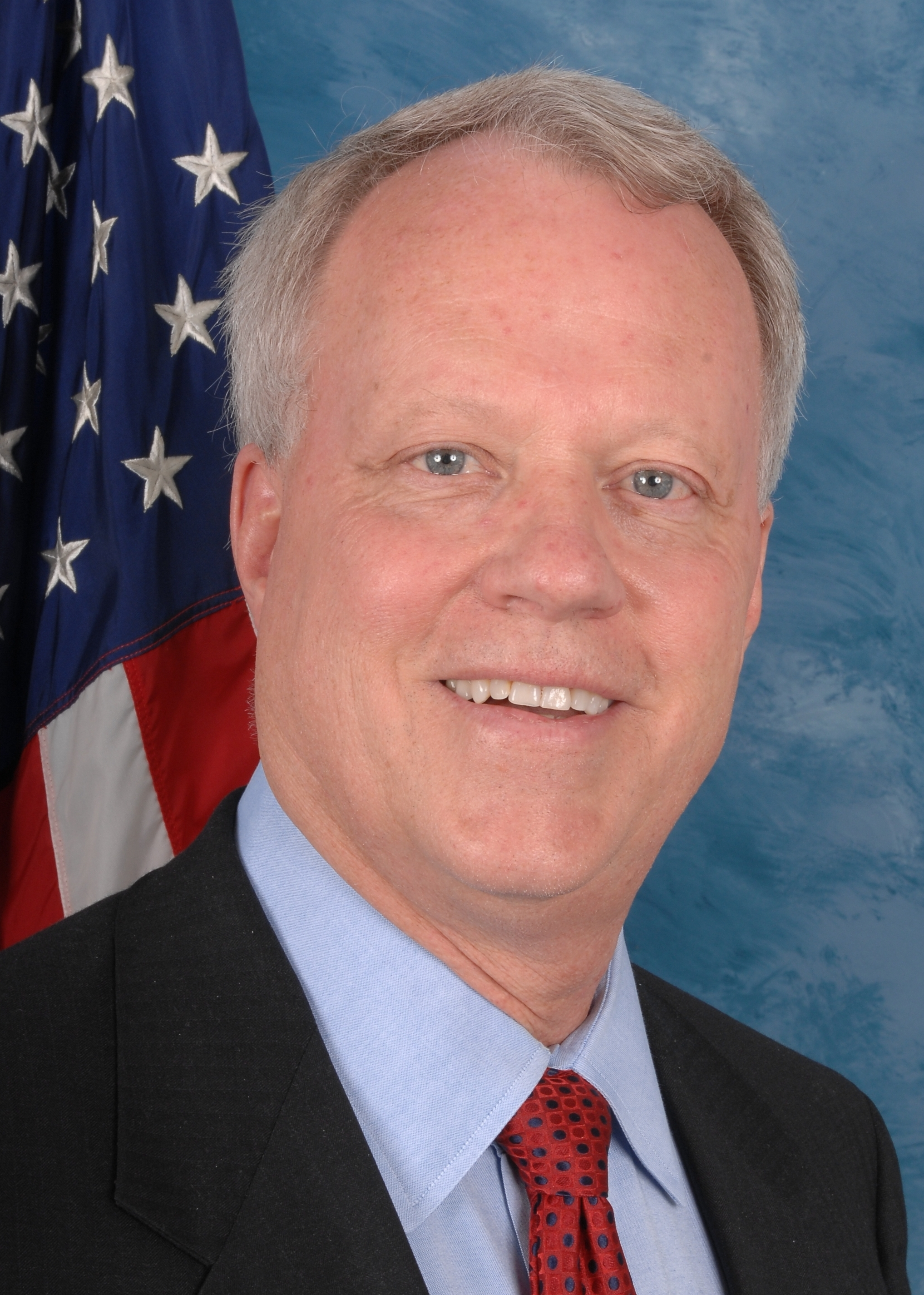

Nominee	Paul Broun	Russell Edwards
Party	Republican	Democratic
Popular vote	138,062	66,905
Percentage	67.4%	32.6%
- County results Broun: 50–60% 60–70% 70–80% 80–90% Edwards: 60–70%
U.S. Representative before election
Paul Broun
Republican
Elected U.S. Representative
Paul Broun
Republican

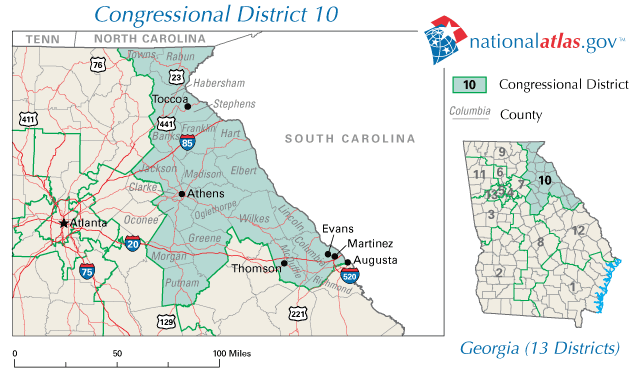
Georgia's 10th congressional district in 2010

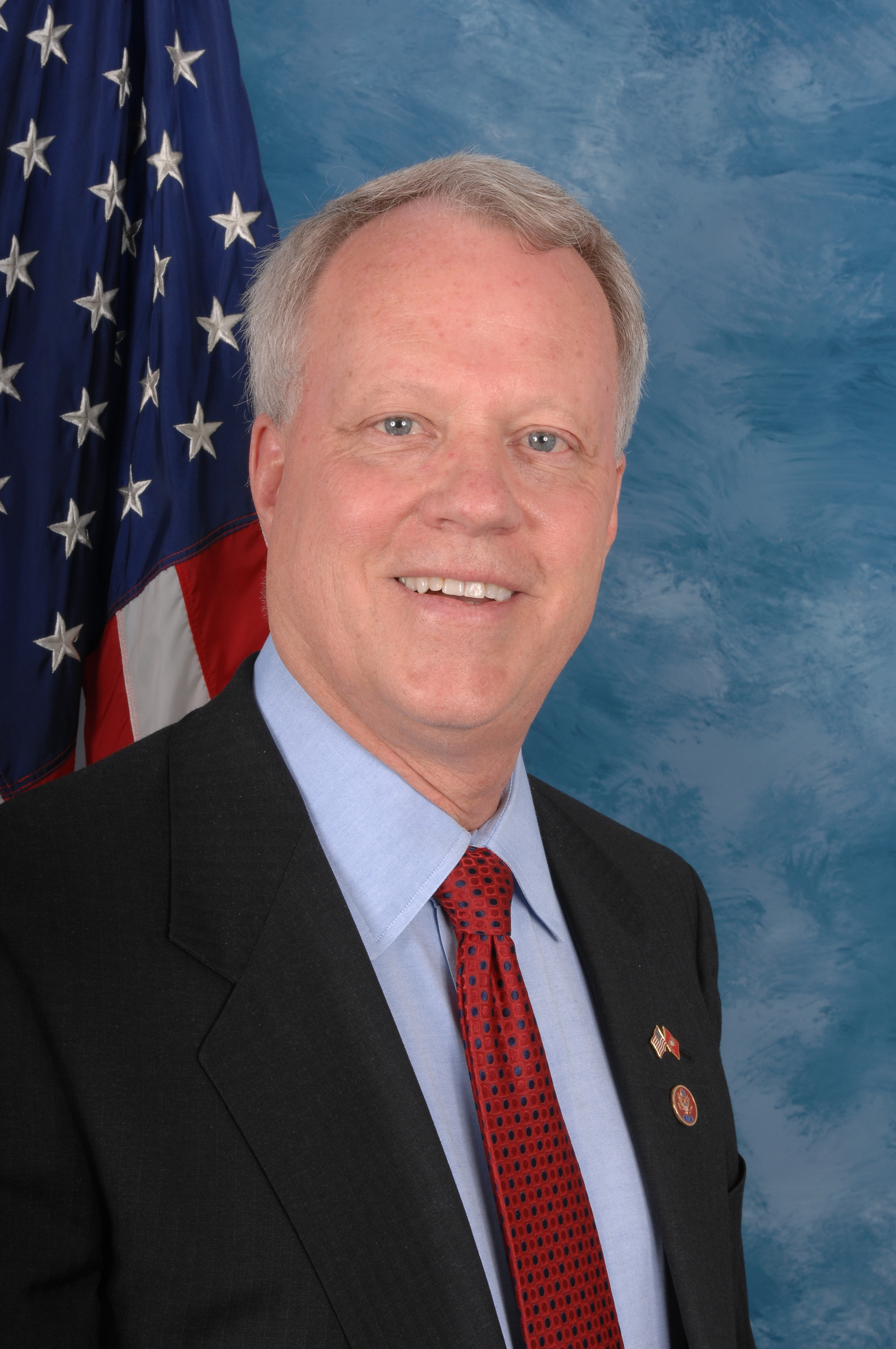
Paul Broun, who was re-elected as the U.S. representative for the 10th district

The 10th district included Athens-Clarke, Martinez and Augusta-Richmond. The district's population was 73 percent white, 19 percent black and 5 percent Hispanic (see Race and ethnicity in the United States); 81 percent were high school graduates and 24 percent had received a bachelor's degree or higher. Its median income was $43,135. In the 2008 presidential election the district gave 62 percent of its vote to Republican nominee John McCain and 37 percent to Democratic nominee Barack Obama.

Republican Paul Broun, who took office in 2007, was the incumbent. Broun was re-elected in 2008 with 61 percent of the vote. In 2010 Broun's opponent in the general election was Russell Edwards, a law student and former teacher. Broun and Edwards were unopposed in their respective primaries.

Broun raised $2,032,417 and spent $1,831,081. Edwards raised $220,662 and spent $218,078. Prior to the election FiveThirtyEight's forecast gave Broun a 100 percent chance of winning and projected that he would receive 67 percent of the vote to Edwards's 31 percent. On election day Broun was re-elected with 67 percent of the vote to Edwards's 33 percent. Broun was again re-elected in 2012 and unsuccessfully ran for the U.S. Senate rather than seeking re-election in 2014. He was succeeded by fellow Republican Jody Hice.

=== Predictions ===
Source	Ranking	As of
The Cook Political Report	Safe R	November 1, 2010
Rothenberg	Safe R	November 1, 2010
Sabato's Crystal Ball	Safe R	November 1, 2010
RCP	Safe R	November 1, 2010
CQ Politics	Safe R	October 28, 2010
New York Times	Safe R	November 1, 2010
FiveThirtyEight	Safe R	November 1, 2010

=== General election results ===
Georgia's 10th district general election, November 2, 2010
Party	Candidate	Votes	%
Republican	Paul Broun (incumbent)	138,062	67.36
Democratic	Russell Edwards	66,905	32.64
Total votes		204,967	100.00

=== External links ===
- "Paul Broun campaign website". Archived from the original on November 1, 2010.
- "Russell Edwards campaign website". Archived from the original on October 28, 2010.

== District 11 ==
2010 Georgia's 11th congressional district election
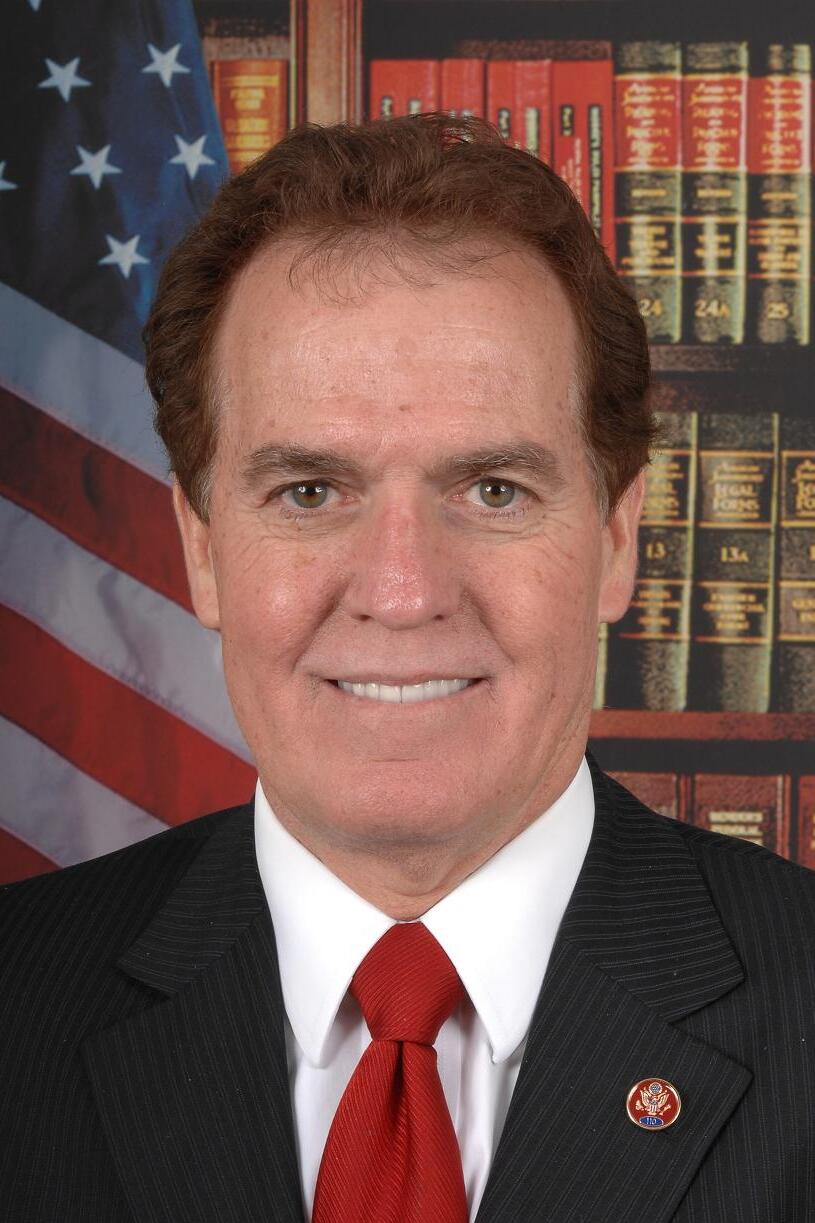
Nominee	Phil Gingrey
Party	Republican
Popular vote	Unopposed
U.S. Representative before election
Phil Gingrey
Republican
Elected U.S. Representative
Phil Gingrey
Republican

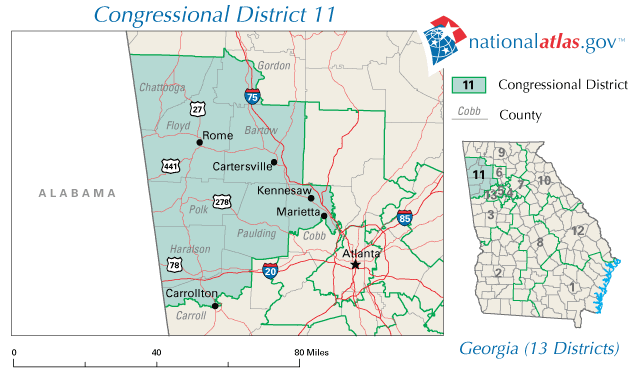
Georgia's 11th congressional district in 2010

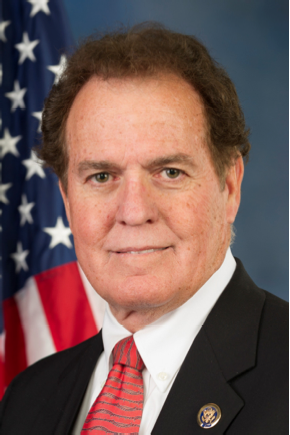
Phil Gingrey, who was re-elected as the U.S. representative for the 11th district

The 11th district included Kennesaw, Rome and part of Marietta. The district's population was 75 percent white, 14 percent black and 8 percent Hispanic (see Race and ethnicity in the United States census); 82 percent were high school graduates and 24 percent had received a bachelor's degree or higher. Its median income was $53,784. In the 2008 presidential election the district gave 66 percent of its vote to Republican nominee John McCain and 33 percent to Democratic nominee Barack Obama.

Republican Phil Gingrey, who took office in 2003, was the incumbent. He was re-elected in 2008 with 68 percent of the vote. In 2010 he was unopposed for re-election. Gingrey raised $1,389,039 and spent $920,811. Gingrey was again re-elected in 2012 and unsuccessfully ran for the U.S. Senate rather than seeking re-election in 2014. He was succeeded by fellow Republican Barry Loudermilk.

=== Predictions ===
Source	Ranking	As of
The Cook Political Report	Safe R	November 1, 2010
Rothenberg	Safe R	November 1, 2010
Sabato's Crystal Ball	Safe R	November 1, 2010
RCP	Safe R	November 1, 2010
CQ Politics	Safe R	October 28, 2010
New York Times	Safe R	November 1, 2010
FiveThirtyEight	Safe R	November 1, 2010

=== External links ===
- "Phil Gingrey campaign website". Archived from the original on November 1, 2010.

== District 12 ==
2010 Georgia's 12th congressional district election
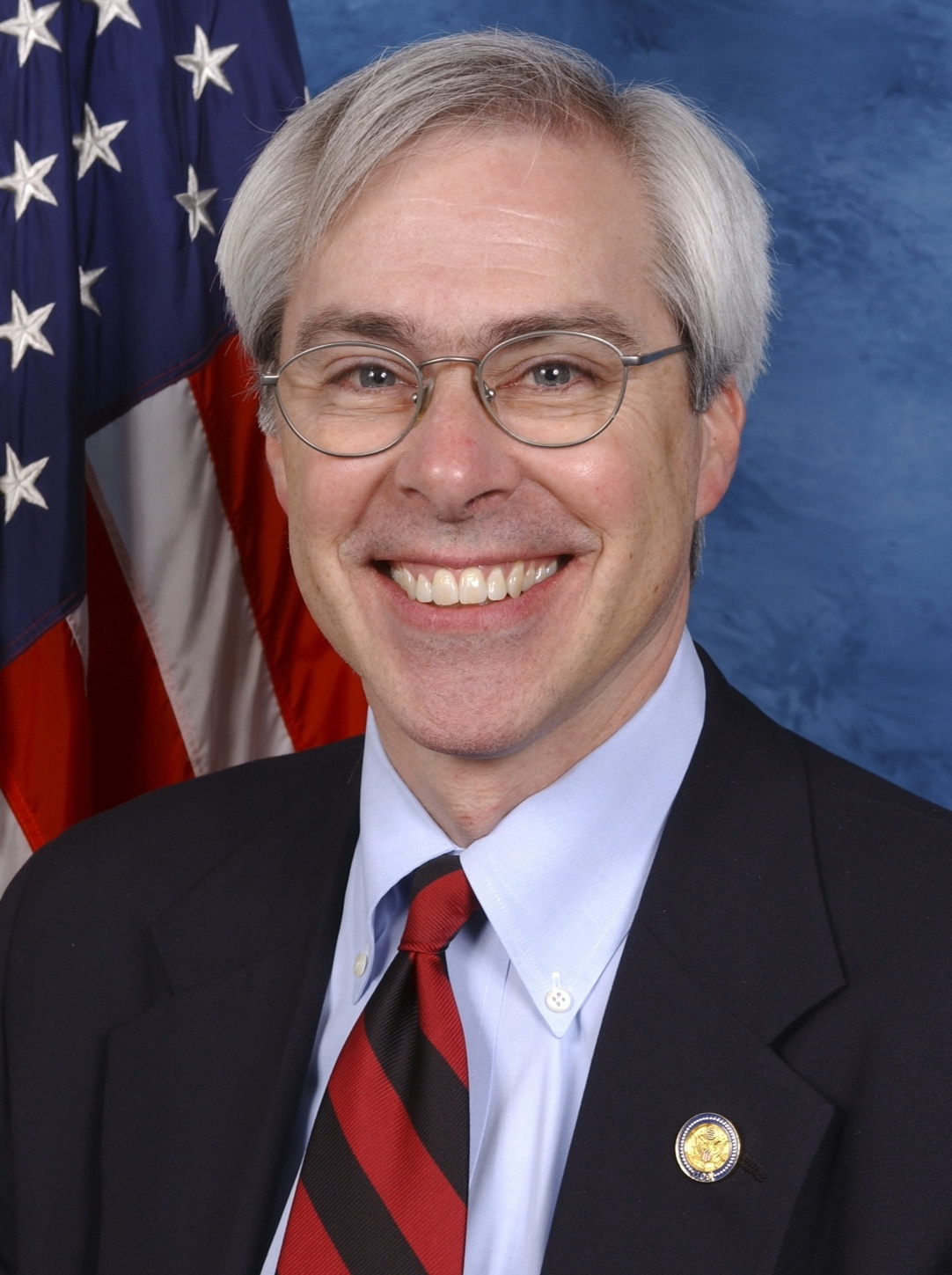

Nominee	John Barrow	Ray McKinney
Party	Democratic	Republican
Popular vote	92,459	70,938
Percentage	56.6%	43.4%
- County results Barrow: 50–60% 60–70% 70–80% McKinney: 50–60% 60–70% 70–80%
U.S. Representative before election
John Barrow
Democratic
Elected U.S. Representative
John Barrow
Democratic

The 12th district included Statesboro and parts of Augusta-Richmond and Savannah. The district's population was 50 percent white and 44 percent black (see Race and ethnicity in the United States); 78 percent were high school graduates and 16 percent had received a bachelor's degree or higher. Its median income was $36,643. In the 2008 presidential election the district gave 54 percent of its vote to Democratic nominee Barack Obama and 45 percent to Republican nominee John McCain. In 2010 the district had a Cook Partisan Voting Index of D+1.

Democrat John Barrow, who took office in 2005, was the incumbent. Barrow was re-elected in 2008 with 66 percent of the vote. In 2010 his opponent in the general election was Republican nominee Ray McKinney, a project manager for nuclear power plants.

Regina Thomas, a former member of the Georgia State Senate, also sought the Democratic nomination. Thomas also planned to run as a write-in candidate in the general election, but in August 2010 the office of the Secretary of State of Georgia ruled that she was ineligible to do so. In March 2010, John McArdle of CQ Politics wrote that the name of Michael Thurmond, the state Labor Commissioner, was "being floated by Georgia insiders" as a potential candidate in the Democratic primary; however in April 2010, Thurmond announced he would run for the U.S. Senate. Lester Jackson, another member of the State Senate, said in April 2010 that he would seek re-election rather than challenging Barrow for the Democratic nomination.

Mike Horner, a retired U.S. Air Force officer and banker; Jeanne Seaver, an activist; and Carl Smith, the fire chief of Thunderbolt, also sought the Republican nomination. Wayne Mosley, a doctor and former U.S. Army lieutenant colonel, ended his campaign for the Republican nomination in October 2009. McKinney and Smith advanced to the primary runoff election.

Barrow raised $1,951,721 and spent $1,905,568. McKinney raised $250,534 and spent $246,792. Thomas raised $48,353 and spent $46,311. Horner raised $13,865 and spent $13,782. Seaver raised $43,022 and spent $42,960. Smith raised $72,085 and spent $71,987. Mosley raised $29,470 and spent the same amount.

In October 2010, John Fund of The Wall Street Journal included the race as one of "five races that could deliver upset victories", on grounds that the district had voted for George W. Bush in the 2004 presidential election. Prior to the election FiveThirtyEight's forecast gave Barrow a 100 percent chance of winning and projected that he would receive 60 percent of the vote to McKinney's 38 percent. On election day Barrow was re-elected with 57 percent of the vote to McKinney's 43 percent. Barrow was again re-elected in 2012 and unsuccessfully sought re-election in 2014. He was succeeded by Republican Rick Allen.

=== Democratic primary results ===
Georgia's 12th district Democratic primary, July 20, 2010
Party	Candidate	Votes	%
Democratic	John Barrow (incumbent)	19,505	57.87
Democratic	Regina Thomas	14,201	42.13
Total votes		33,706	100.00

=== Republican primary results ===
Georgia's 12th district Republican primary, July 20, 2010
Party	Candidate	Votes	%
Republican	Ray McKinney	11,709	42.61
Republican	Carl Smith	7,677	24.94
Republican	Jeanne Seaver	5,040	18.34
Republican	Mike Horner	3,051	11.10
Total votes		27,477	100.00

=== Republican primary runoff results ===
Georgia's 12th district Republican primary runoff, August 10, 2010
Party	Candidate	Votes	%
Republican	Ray McKinney	14,256	62.04
Republican	Carl Smith	8,724	37.96
Total votes		22,980	100.00

==== Predictions ====
Source	Ranking	As of
The Cook Political Report	Likely D	November 1, 2010
Rothenberg	Safe D	November 1, 2010
Sabato's Crystal Ball	Safe D	November 1, 2010
RCP	Likely D	November 1, 2010
CQ Politics	Safe D	October 28, 2010
New York Times	Lean D	November 1, 2010
FiveThirtyEight	Safe D	November 1, 2010

=== General election results ===
Georgia's 12th district general election, November 2, 2010
Party	Candidate	Votes	%
Democratic	John Barrow (incumbent)	92,459	56.59
Republican	Ray McKinney	70,938	43.41
Total votes		163,397	100.00

=== External links ===
- "John Barrow campaign website". Archived from the original on October 29, 2010.
- "Mike Horner campaign website". Archived from the original on July 23, 2010.
- "Ray McKinney campaign website". Archived from the original on October 28, 2010.
- "Jeanne Seaver campaign website". Archived from the original on March 27, 2010.
- "Carl Smith campaign website". Archived from the original on October 18, 2010.

== District 13 ==
2010 Georgia's 13th congressional district election
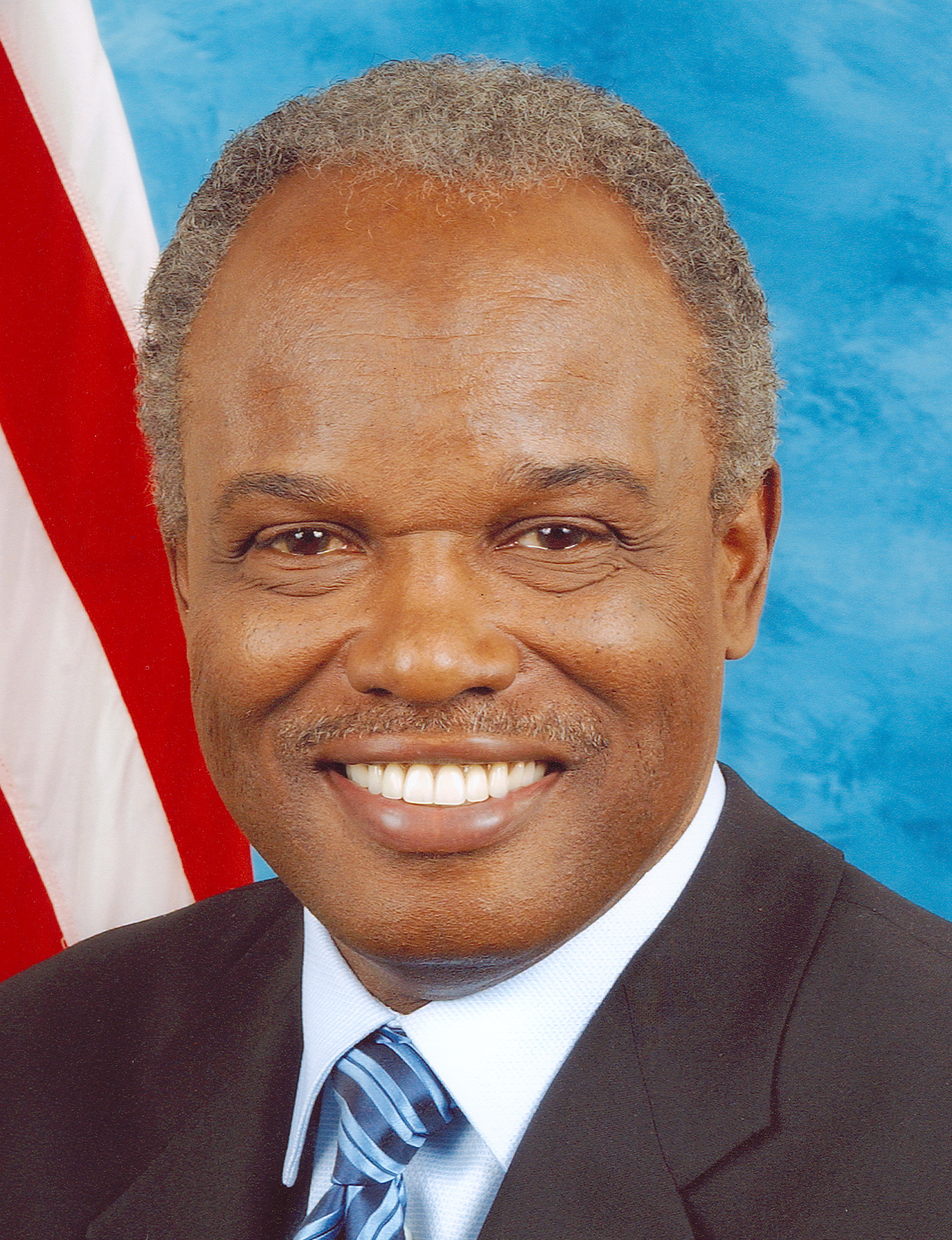

Nominee	David Scott	Mike Crane
Party	Democratic	Republican
Popular vote	140,294	61,771
Percentage	69.4%	30.6%
- County results Scott: 50–60% 60–70% 80–90% 90–100%
U.S. Representative before election
David Scott
Democratic
Elected U.S. Representative
David Scott
Democratic

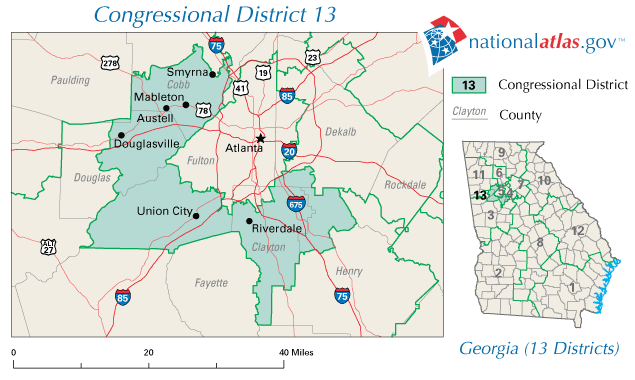
Georgia's 13th congressional district in 2010

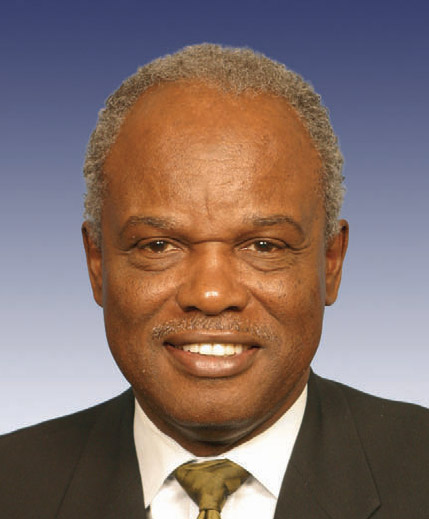
David Scott, who was re-elected as the U.S. representative for the 13th district

The 13th district included Mableton and part of Smyrna. The district's population was 53 percent black, 31 percent white and 11 percent Hispanic (see Race and ethnicity in the United States); 85 percent were high school graduates and 25 percent had received a bachelor's degree or higher. Its median income was $51,398. In the 2008 presidential election the district gave 72 percent of its vote to Democratic nominee Barack Obama and 27 percent to Republican nominee John McCain.

Democrat David Scott, who took office in 2003, was the incumbent. Scott was re-elected in 2008 with 69 percent of the vote. In 2010 Scott's opponent in the general election was Republican nominee Mike Crane, a general contractor.

Michael Frisbee and Mike Murphy also sought the Democratic nomination. Hank Dudek, a regional account manager for a background screening company; Chip Flanegan, a small business owner; Deborah Honeycutt, a medical director at Clayton State University Health Services; Dave Orr, a food and restaurant business manager; and Rupert Parchment, the owner of Decor Moving Services, also sought the Republican nomination. Crane and Honeycutt advanced to the primary runoff election.

Scott raised $862,262 and spent $811,744. Crane raised $147,199 and spent $143,214. Frisbee raised $6,751 and spent $6,509. Murphy raised $12,435 and spent $13,670. Dudek raised $8,196 and spent $8,790. Flanegan raised $49,400 and spent $47,112. Honeycutt raised $196,736 and spent $278,163. Orr raised $10,519 and spent $10,518. Parchment raised $17,363 and spent $16,900.

Prior to the election FiveThirtyEight's forecast gave Scott a 100 percent chance of winning and projected that he would receive 63 percent of the vote to Crane's 35 percent. On election day Scott was re-elected with 69 percent of the vote to Crane's 31 percent. Scott was one of eight Democratic U.S. Representatives who were elected by a greater margin in 2010 than in 2008. Scott was again re-elected in 2012, 2014, 2016 and 2018. In December 2011, Crane won a seat in the Georgia State Senate.

=== Democratic primary results ===
Georgia's 13th district Democratic primary, July 20, 2010
Party	Candidate	Votes	%
Democratic	David Scott (incumbent)	34,374	76.12
Democratic	Mike Murphy	7,556	16.73
Democratic	Michael Frisbee	3,229	7.15
Total votes		45,159	100.00

=== Republican primary results ===
Georgia's 13th district Republican primary, July 20, 2010
Party	Candidate	Votes	%
Republican	Mike Crane	7,234	29.41
Republican	Deborah Honeycutt	6,538	26.58
Republican	Chip Flanegan	4,137	16.82
Republican	Dave Orr	3,113	12.66
Republican	Hank Dudek	2,322	9.44
Republican	Rupert Parchment	1,257	5.11
Total votes		24,601	100.00

=== Republican primary runoff results ===
Georgia's 13th district Republican primary runoff, August 10, 2010
Party	Candidate	Votes	%
Republican	Mike Crane	15,286	67.53
Republican	Deborah Honeycutt	7,349	32.47
Total votes		22,635	100.00

==== Predictions ====
Source	Ranking	As of
The Cook Political Report	Safe D	November 1, 2010
Rothenberg	Safe D	November 1, 2010
Sabato's Crystal Ball	Safe D	November 1, 2010
RCP	Safe D	November 1, 2010
CQ Politics	Safe D	October 28, 2010
New York Times	Safe D	November 1, 2010
FiveThirtyEight	Safe D	November 1, 2010

=== General election results ===
Georgia's 13th district general election, November 2, 2010
Party	Candidate	Votes	%
Democratic	David Scott (incumbent)	140,294	69.43
Republican	Mike Crane	61,771	30.57
Total votes		202,065	100.00

=== External links ===
- "Mike Crane campaign website". Archived from the original on November 1, 2010.
- "Hank Dudek campaign website". Archived from the original on May 27, 2010.
- "Chip Flanegan campaign website". Archived from the original on October 5, 2010.
- "Dave Orr campaign website". Archived from the original on September 18, 2010.
- "Rupert Parchment campaign website". Archived from the original on April 29, 2010.

== See also ==
- List of United States representatives from Georgia
- Georgia's congressional delegations
