= Texas Straw Poll =

2008 non-binding straw poll of the Texas Republican Party

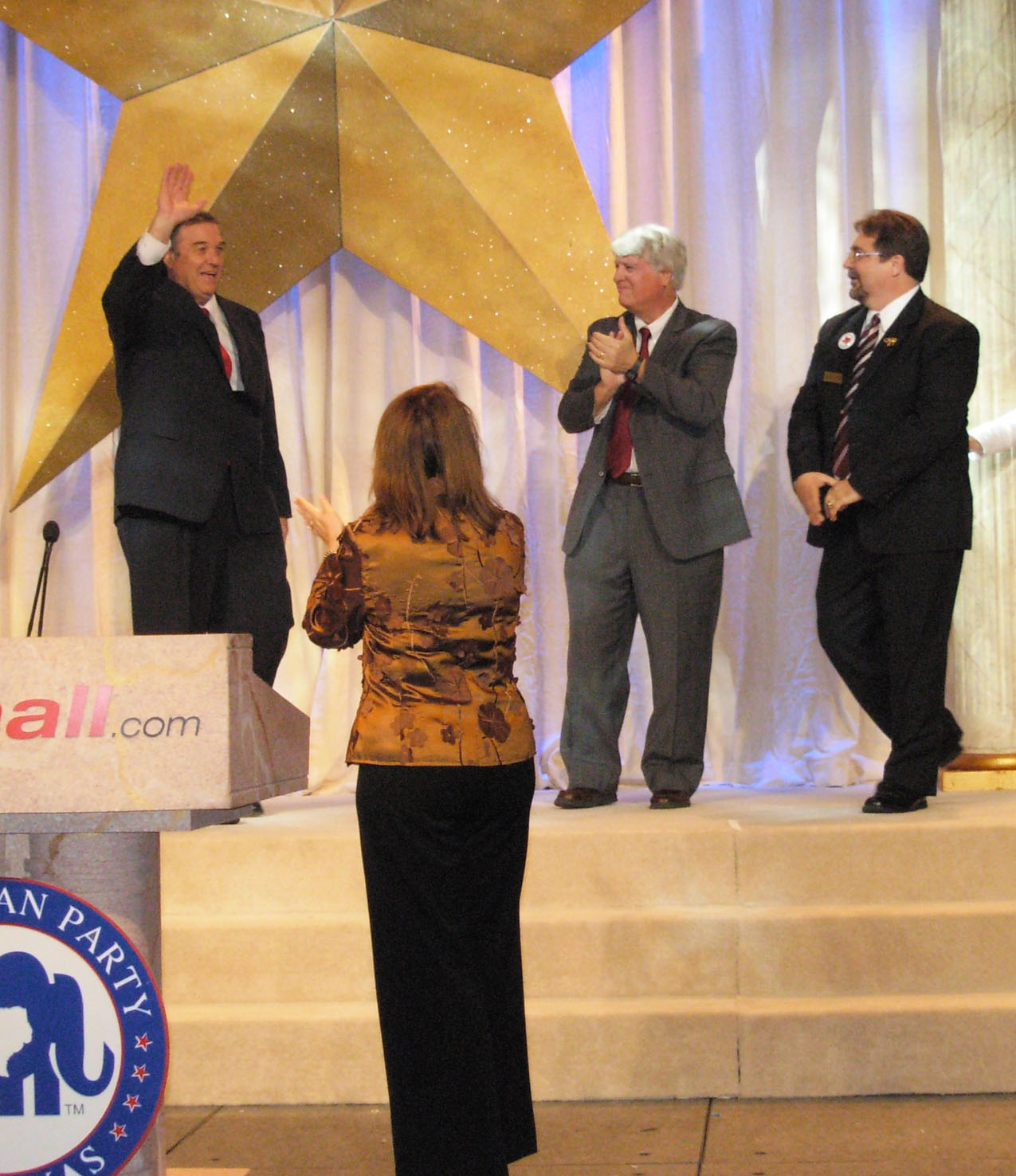
Rep. Duncan Hunter, (left) the winner of the poll, greets the delegation at the Fort Worth Convention Center September 1, 2007, on stage with Dr. Hugh Cort (center), Ray McKinney (right) and Texas GOP Chairman Tina Benkiser (back turned).

The Texas Straw Poll was a non-binding straw poll of the Texas Republican Party for the Republican Party's 2008 presidential nomination. Townhall.com sponsored the event on Saturday, September 1, 2007, in Fort Worth. Five candidates including Congressman Duncan Hunter of California, Congressman Ron Paul of Texas, mechanical engineer Ray McKinney of George, attorney John H. Cox of Illinois and psychiatrist Hugh Cort of Alabama, attended and addressed the voters. In total, 1,300 votes were cast. Hunter won with 534 votes. Former Senator Fred Thompson of Tennessee, who did not address the event, finished second. Paul came in third.

In 2011, organizers canceled a repeat of the event slated to determine preferences for the 2012 Republican Party presidential nomination.

== Participants ==
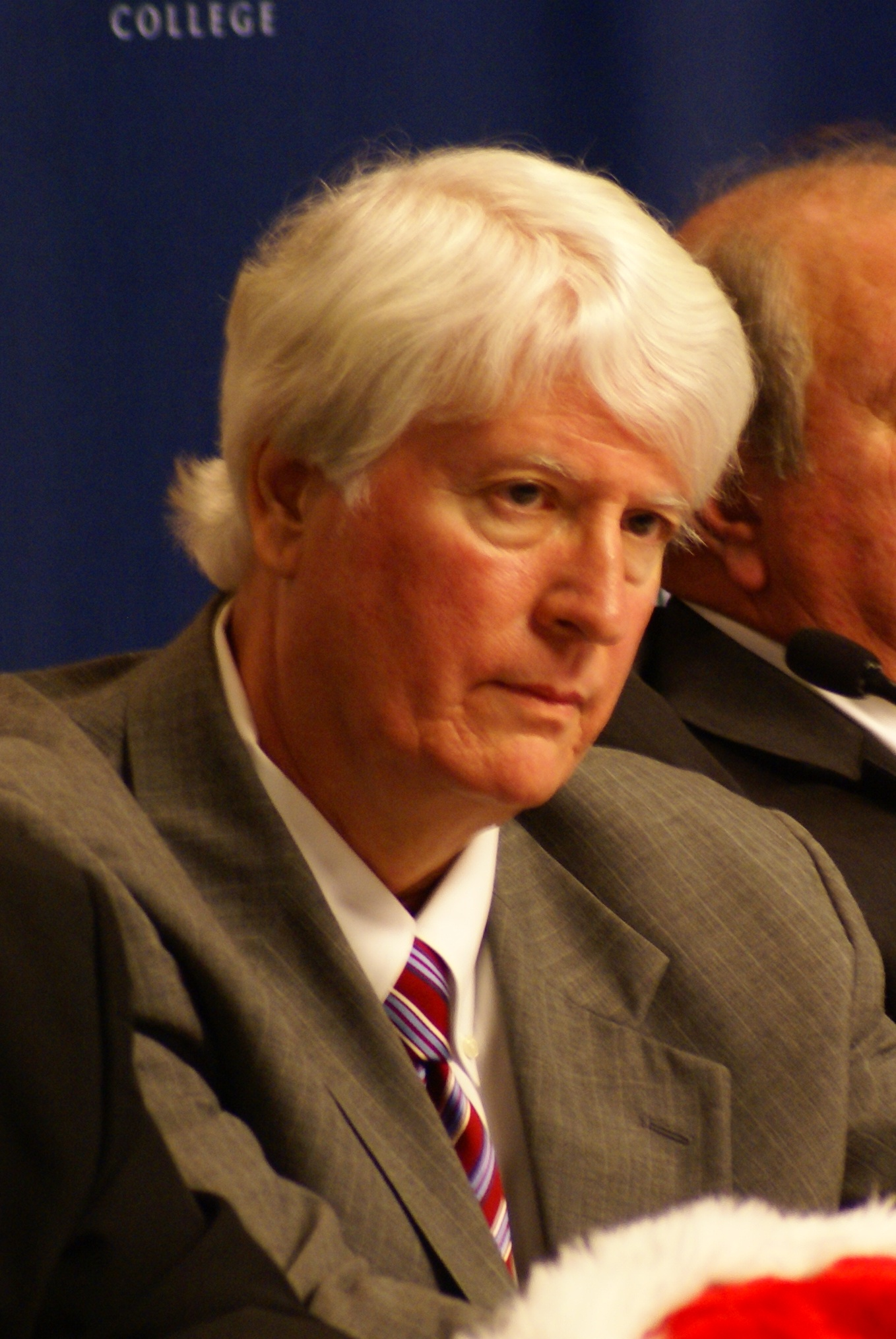
Hugh Cort

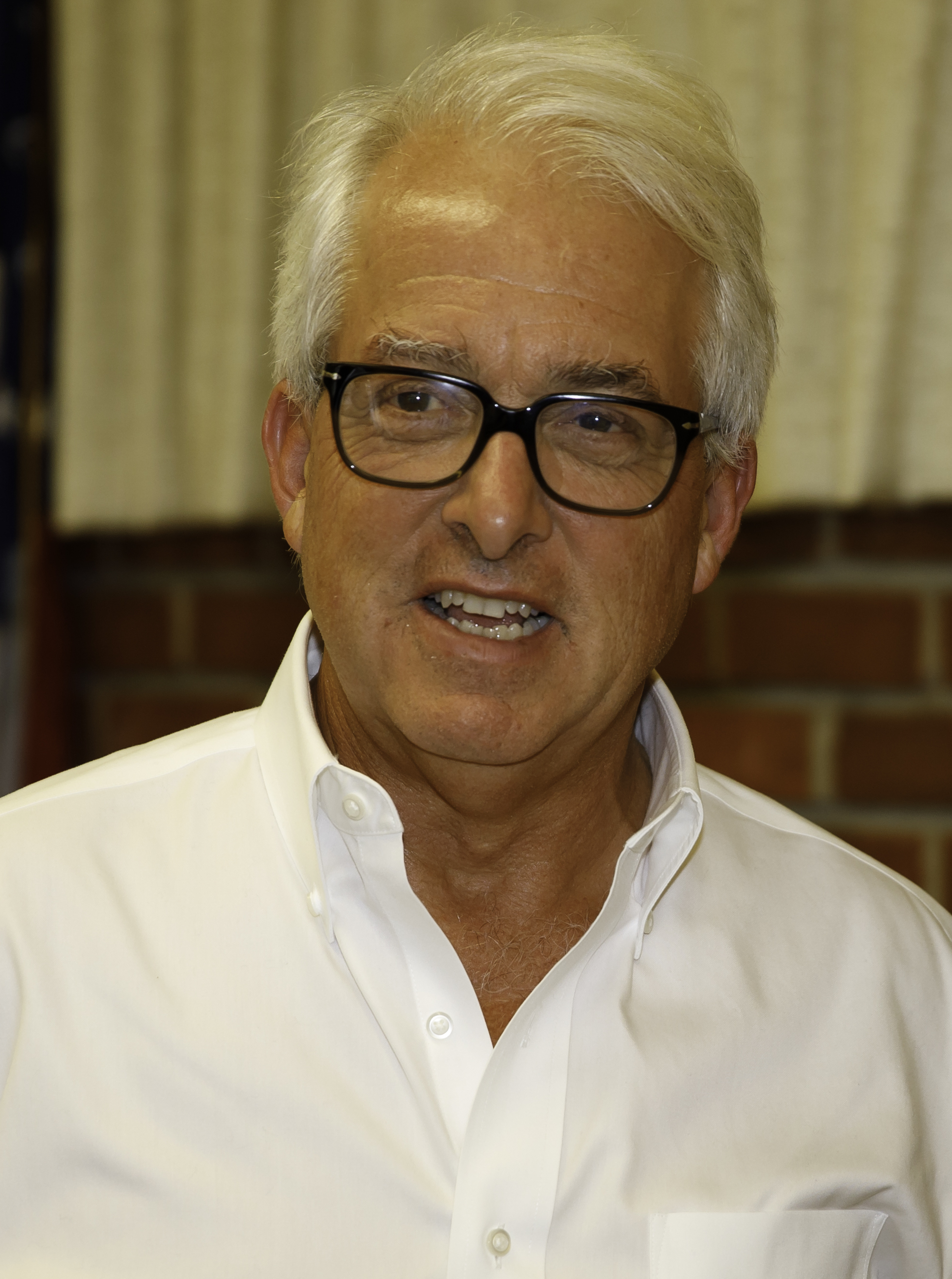
John H. Cox

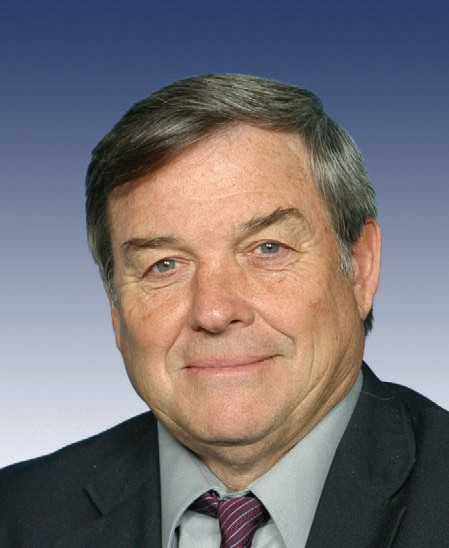
Duncan Hunter

Ray McKinney

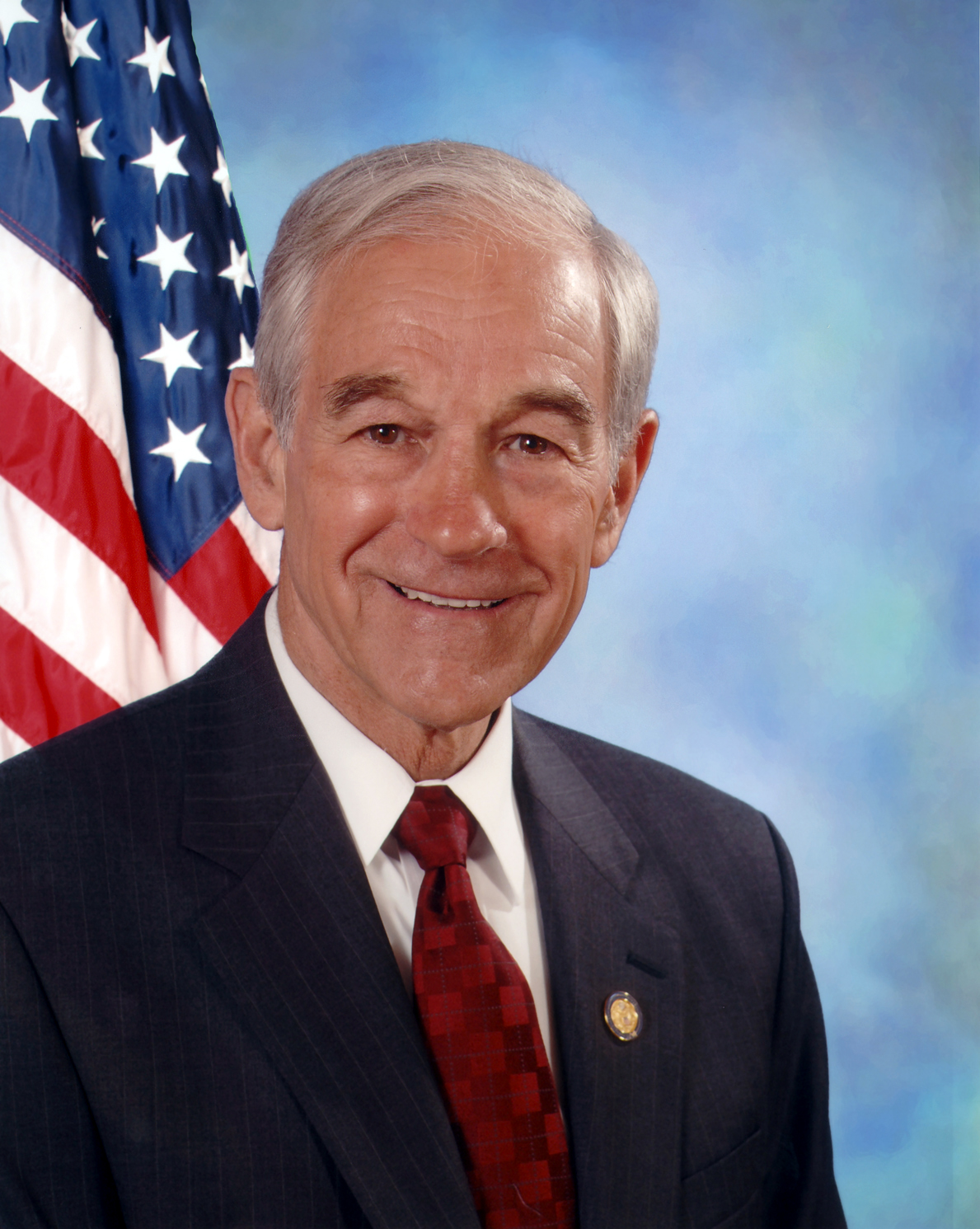
Ron Paul

== Results ==
Voters were required to either have served as a delegate or alternate to a Texas Republican Party Convention in the preceding four years or have served as a Texas delegate at either of the previous two Republican National Conventions. The results were non-binding.

Place	Candidate	Votes	Percentage
1	Duncan Hunter	534	41.08%
2	Fred Thompson	266	20.46
3	Ron Paul	217	16.69
4	Mike Huckabee	83	6.38
5	Rudy Giuliani	78	6.00
6	Mitt Romney	61	4.69
7	Ray McKinney	28	2.15
8	John H. Cox	10	0.77
9	John McCain	8	0.62
10	Sam Brownback	6	0.46
11	Tom Tancredo	6	0.46
12	Hugh Cort	3	0.23
	Total	1,300	

== Cancellation ==
The 2011 poll was canceled due to a lack of candidate interest.
