= Ray McKinney =

American politician (born 1962)

- Born: Raymond Louis McKinney; June 20, 1962 (age 63); Brackenridge, Pennsylvania, U.S.
- Occupation: Mechanical services manager
- Political party: Republican
- Spouse: Lisa

McKinney at the podium at the Texas Straw Poll.

Raymond Louis "Ray" McKinney (born June 20, 1962) is a mechanical services manager from Savannah, Georgia, and was the Republican Party nominee for the U.S. House of Representatives in Georgia's 12th congressional district in 2010. He was a candidate for President of the United States in the Republican primaries in 2008, but withdrew on November 14, 2007.

== Personal life, education and career ==
McKinney was born June 20, 1962, in Brackenridge, Pennsylvania. After graduating from Effingham County Public High School, where he was voted "most likely to become a nuclear scientist", McKinney had two years of Gulfstream Aerospace machinist training, two years Tool and Die, CFS machinist training, and (through 1990) two years at Savannah for Electro-Mechanical Engineering. He has been in the industry for the last 23 years. McKinney is currently a nuclear services manager for Continental Field Systems in Savannah. He and his wife Lisa live in Lyons on the McKinney family farm.

When asked about his educational and work experience, McKinney had this to say about his choice of career:

I think I prefer the term "machinist" above all but my wife thinks I put myself down by saying that. It is the proudest part of my skill set though. Her point is that people respect higher education and by telling people that I am a machinist that they have a lower opinion of who I am. Actually, I am quite proud of it.

His thoughts on skilled trades and why they are good knowledge and experience for someone to have:

Having a skill is like hitting the lotto. You will always have a job, you will always be able to earn a living. It is something that no one can ever take away. You can be a manager all you want, but if you ever go back to your tools you will always be able to find work. College is great but coupled with a skill, that is the golden ticket.

== 2008 Presidential campaign ==
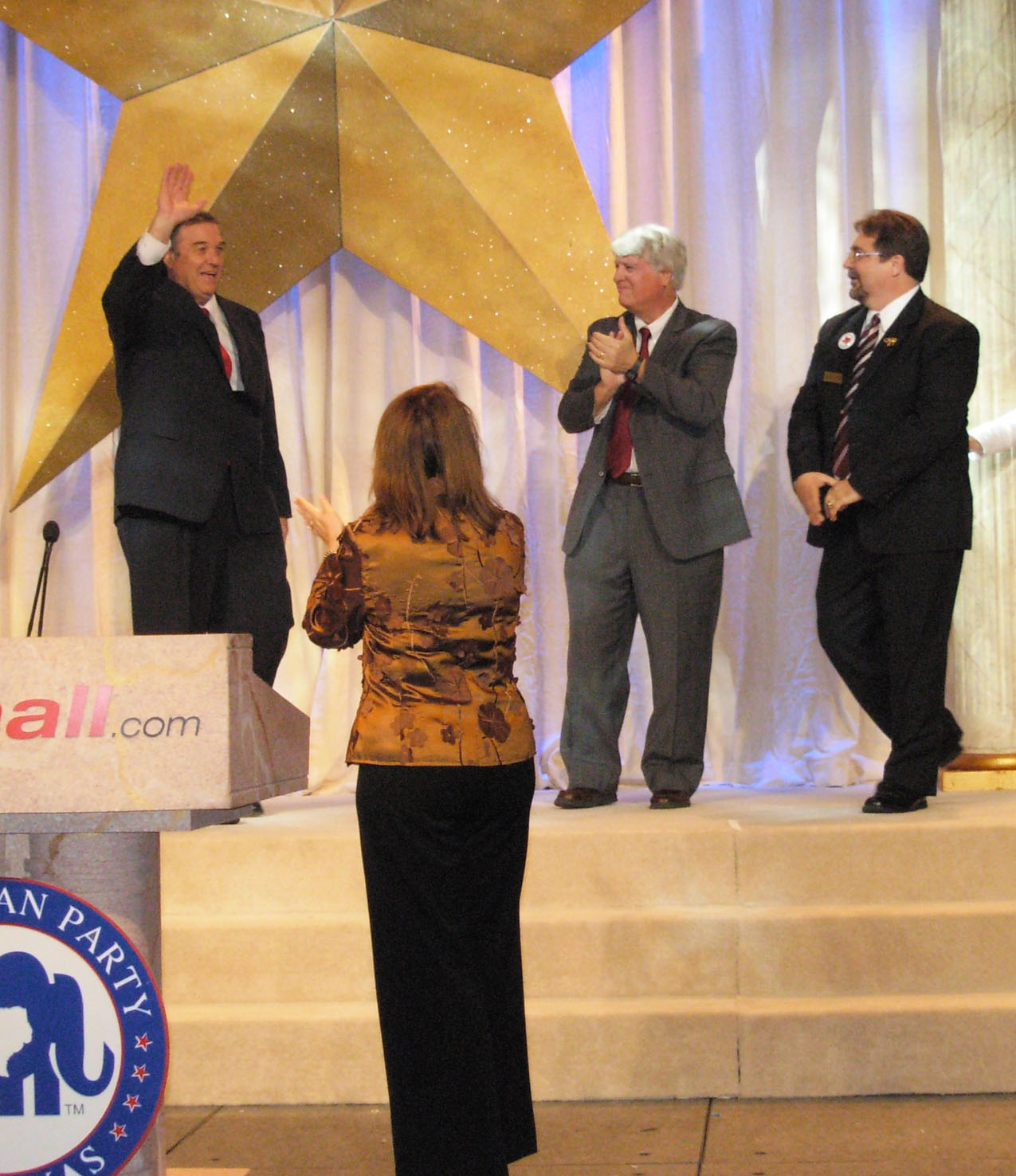
McKinney (right) greets the delegation at the Texas Republican Straw Poll September 1, 2007, on stage with Rep. Duncan L. Hunter (left), Hugh Cort (center), and Tina Benkiser (back turned).

McKinney, in a surprise performance, bested Sen. John McCain, Sen. Sam Brownback, and Rep. Tom Tancredo in the Texas Straw Poll held September 1, 2007, in Fort Worth, Texas. McKinney carried 28 delegate votes, or 2.2%.

Along with his mother, he gave complimentary blood pressure checks at a booth at the Fort Worth Convention Center during the straw poll, and addressed the delegates during the main session prior to voting along with candidates Rep. Duncan L. Hunter of California, Rep. Ron Paul of Texas, Alabama psychiatrist Hugh Cort, and Illinois lawyer John H. Cox.

During his campaign, McKinney often had the highest ranking at U4Prez.com of all candidates registered with the Federal Election Commission. McKinney ended his bid for the presidential race on November 14, 2007, announcing his intention to run for U.S. Congress from Georgia. On July 15, 2008, McKinney lost the Republican primary to John Stone.

== 2010 Congressional campaign ==
On March 30, McKinney announced he was running for Congress against John Barrow. According to his website, he has been endorsed by the Tea Party Express.

In the Republican primary, McKinney and Thunderbolt Fire Chief Carl Smith, who earned 43% and 28% respectively, headed to a runoff. On July 25, 2010, Ray McKinney failed to appear for a debate against Smith. However, in the August 10th runoff, McKinney defeated Smith 62% to 38%.
