= 2024 United States House of Representatives elections in Georgia =

- November 5, 2024

All 14 Georgia seats to the United States House of Representatives
	Majority party	Minority party
Party	Republican	Democratic
Last election	9	5
Seats won	9	5
Seat change	Steady	Steady
Popular vote	2,702,118	2,434,984
Percentage	52.50%	47.50%
Swing	▲0.29%	▼0.29%

Republican
50–60%
60–70%
70–80%
80–90%
90–100%
Democratic
50–60%
60–70%
70–80%
80–90%

The 2024 United States House of Representatives elections in Georgia were held on November 5, 2024, to elect the fourteen U.S. representatives from the State of Georgia, one from each of the state's congressional districts. The elections coincided with the 2024 U.S. presidential election, other elections to the House of Representatives, elections to the United States Senate, and various state and local elections. The primary elections were held on May 21, 2024.

== Background ==
The new congressional districts map passed by the state legislature Interactive map version

Following the Supreme Court decision in Allen v. Milligan that upheld key anti-gerrymandering provisions of the Voting Rights Act of 1965, requiring the state of Alabama to create a second majority-Black congressional district, it was expected that a number of other Southern states with significant Black populations would see court challenges to their congressional maps. On October 26, 2023, a district court judge in Georgia similarly found that Georgia's congressional maps, enacted as part of the 2020 United States redistricting cycle, were illegally racially gerrymandered. The state of Georgia accepted the judge's findings, and the Georgia General Assembly convened to pass legislation to establish a new congressional map to be used in future elections until 2032 (when new maps will be adopted to reflect changes in the 2030 United States census); Governor Brian Kemp signed the legislation. Judge Steve C. Jones, who struck down the previous maps, accepted the new maps the legislature approved to be used in future election cycles as they met the standards he set in ensuring the districts comply with the Voting Rights Act of 1965.

The partisan split of the map remains the same, with nine seats leaning toward the Republican Party and five seats leaning toward the Democratic Party. The changes affect the Metro Atlanta area, with an additional Black-majority district added (the 6th) in Western Atlanta, including parts of the city of Atlanta, southern and western Fulton County and most of Douglas County, including Douglasville which are majority-Black, as well as a small portion of Fayette County and southern Cobb County, which are majority-minority. The 4th district retains most of DeKalb County, but extends into a portion majority-minority Gwinnett County instead of Rockdale County and Newton County. The 13th district maintains most of the parts of Clayton County (exchanging a small sliver for DeKalb County) and maintains its portion in Henry County, but also includes Rockdale County and Newton County, formerly in the 4th district, and extends into southern Gwinnett County. This maintains three majority-Black districts that also now reflect the community of interest in western and southern Atlanta. The former 7th district, which was a majority-minority district where no single ethnic group was dominant, consisted mostly of Gwinnett County as well as John's Creek; it was disbanded as other districts took its portions. The 7th district became what was formerly the 6th district and remained mostly unchanged; however, it now lost its territory in Cobb and Gwinnett counties in exchange for nearly all of North Fulton (a distinct COI closely corresponding with the former Milton County) as well as portions of Hall County and Lumpkin County in North Georgia; which the 9th district lost in exchange for more of Gwinnett County. Additionally, the 10th district gained Eastern Gwinnett County in exchange for counties in Northern Georgia also from the 9th. Finally, the 11th district now contains northeastern Cobb County as well as Gordon County, and the 14th district now contains northwestern Cobb County and lost Gordon County.

== Results summary ==
=== Statewide ===
Party	Candi- dates	Votes		Seats		
Party	Candi- dates	No.	%	No.	+/–	%
Republican Party	14	2,702,118	53.12%	9	–	64.29%
Democratic Party	14	2,384,984	46.88%	5	–	35.71%
Total	28	5,087,102	100%	14	–	100%

Popular vote
Republican	53.12%
Democratic	46.88%

House seats
Republican	64.29%
Democratic	35.71%

=== District ===
Results of the 2024 United States House of Representatives elections in Georgia by district:

District	Republican		Democratic		Total		Result
District	Votes	%	Votes	%	Votes	%	Result
District 1	220,576	61.98%	135,281	38.02%	355,857	100.00%	Republican hold
District 2	136,473	43.67%	176,028	56.33%	312,501	100.00%	Democratic hold
District 3	273,036	66.31%	138,749	33.69%	411,785	100.00%	Republican hold
District 4	74,071	24.42%	229,290	75.58%	303,361	100.00%	Democratic hold
District 5	49,221	14.32%	294,470	85.68%	343,691	100.00%	Democratic hold
District 6	93,909	25.32%	227,027	74.68%	320,936	100.00%	Democratic hold
District 7	275,907	64.85%	149,535	35.15%	425,442	100.00%	Republican hold
District 8	231,547	68.92%	104,434	31.08%	335,981	100.00%	Republican hold
District 9	271,062	69.00%	121,754	31.00%	392,816	100.00%	Republican hold
District 10	256,442	63.05%	150,274	36.95%	406,716	100.00%	Republican hold
District 11	269,849	67.31%	131,064	32.69%	400,913	100.00%	Republican hold
District 12	205,849	60.32%	135,417	39.68%	341,266	100.00%	Republican hold
District 13	100,730	28.17%	256,902	71.83%	357,632	100.00%	Democratic hold
District 14	243,446	64.37%	134,759	35.63%	378,205	100.00%	Republican hold
Total	2,702,118	53.12%	2,384,984	46.88%	5,087,102	100.00%	

== District 1 ==
2024 Georgia's 1st congressional district election
- November 5, 2024
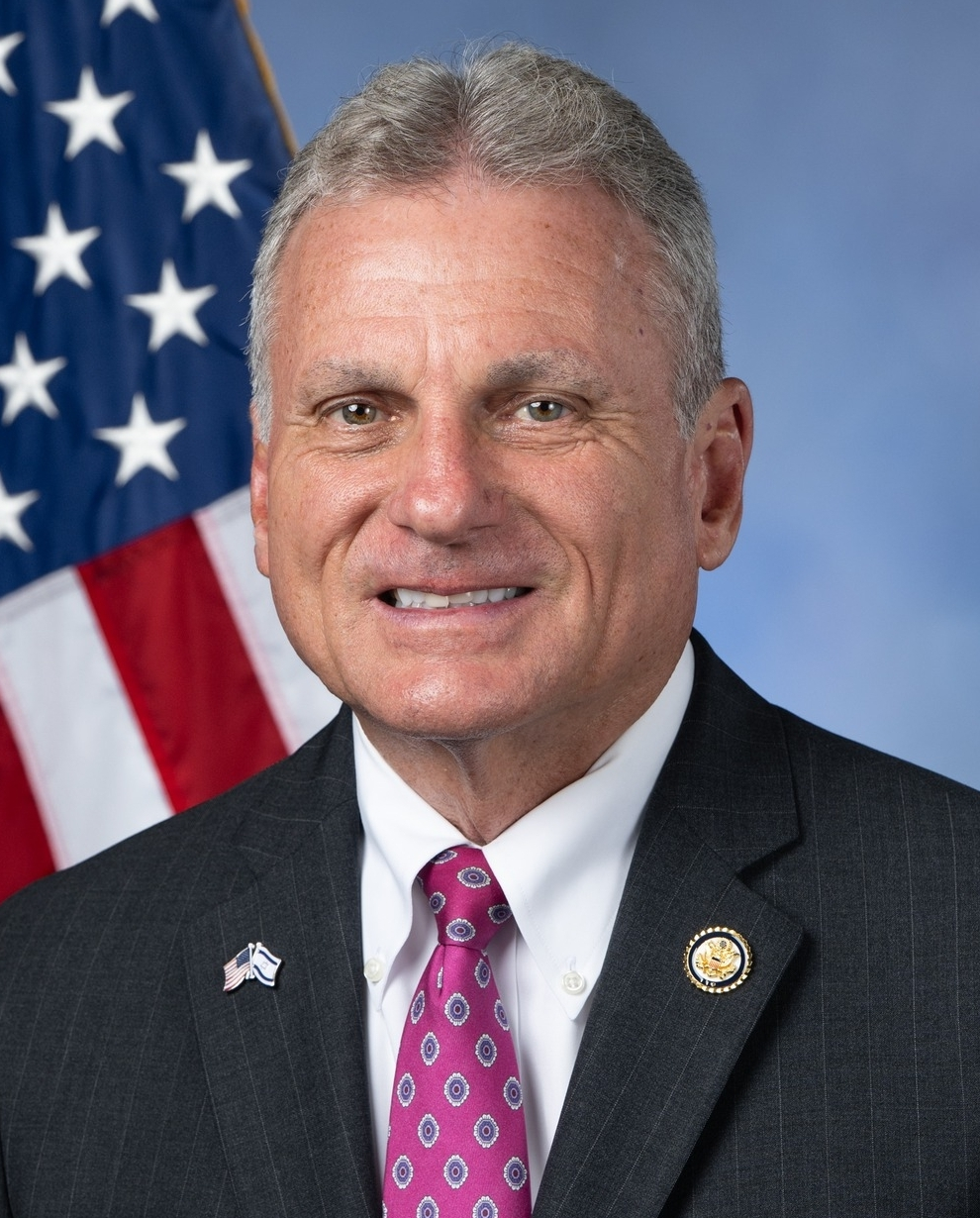

Nominee	Buddy Carter	Patti Hewitt
Party	Republican	Democratic
Popular vote	220,576	135,281
Percentage	62.0%	38.0%
- Carter: 50–60% 60–70% 70–80% 80–90% >90% Hewitt: 50–60% 60–70% 70–80% 80–90% No votes
U.S. Representative before election
Buddy Carter
Republican
Elected U.S. Representative
Buddy Carter
Republican

The 1st district is based in the southeast corner of the state, encompassing Savannah. The incumbent was Republican Buddy Carter, who was re-elected with 59.2% of the vote in 2022.

=== Republican primary ===
==== Nominee ====
- Buddy Carter, incumbent U.S. representative

==== Endorsements ====
Buddy Carter

Organizations

- AIPAC

==== Fundraising ====
Campaign finance reports as of May 1, 2024
Candidate	Raised	Spent	Cash on hand
Buddy Carter (R)	$1,559,064	$980,656	$2,396,016
Source: Federal Election Commission

==== Results ====
Republican primary results
Party	Candidate	Votes	%
Republican	Buddy Carter (incumbent)	51,629	100.0
Total votes		51,629	100.0

=== Democratic primary ===
==== Nominee ====
- Patti Hewitt, business payments consultant

==== Fundraising ====
Campaign finance reports as of May 1, 2024
Candidate	Raised	Spent	Cash on hand
Patti Hewitt (D)	$21,433 (Note: $5,000 of this total was self-funded by Hewitt.)	$18,543	$2,890
Source: Federal Election Commission

==== Results ====
Democratic primary results
Party	Candidate	Votes	%
Democratic	Patti Hewitt	25,082	100.0
Total votes		25,082	100.0

=== Third-party and independent candidates ===
==== Declared ====
- Joyce Griggs (Independent), retired attorney, perennial candidate, and Democratic nominee for this district in 2000 and 2020

==== Fundraising ====
Campaign finance reports as of May 1, 2024
Candidate	Raised	Spent	Cash on hand
Joyce Griggs (I)	$461 (Note: $461 of this total was self-funded by Griggs.)	$572	$122
Source: Federal Election Commission

=== General election ===
==== Predictions ====
Source	Ranking	As of
The Cook Political Report	Solid R	October 31, 2023
Inside Elections	Solid R	March 10, 2023
Sabato's Crystal Ball	Safe R	February 23, 2023
Elections Daily	Safe R	June 8, 2023
CNalysis	Solid R	November 16, 2023
Decision Desk HQ	Solid R	June 1, 2024

==== Results ====
Georgia's 1st congressional district, 2024
Party	Candidate	Votes	%
Republican	Buddy Carter (incumbent)	220,576	62.0
Democratic	Patti Hewitt	135,281	38.0
Total votes		355,857	100.0
Republican hold			

== District 2 ==
2024 Georgia's 2nd congressional district election
- November 5, 2024
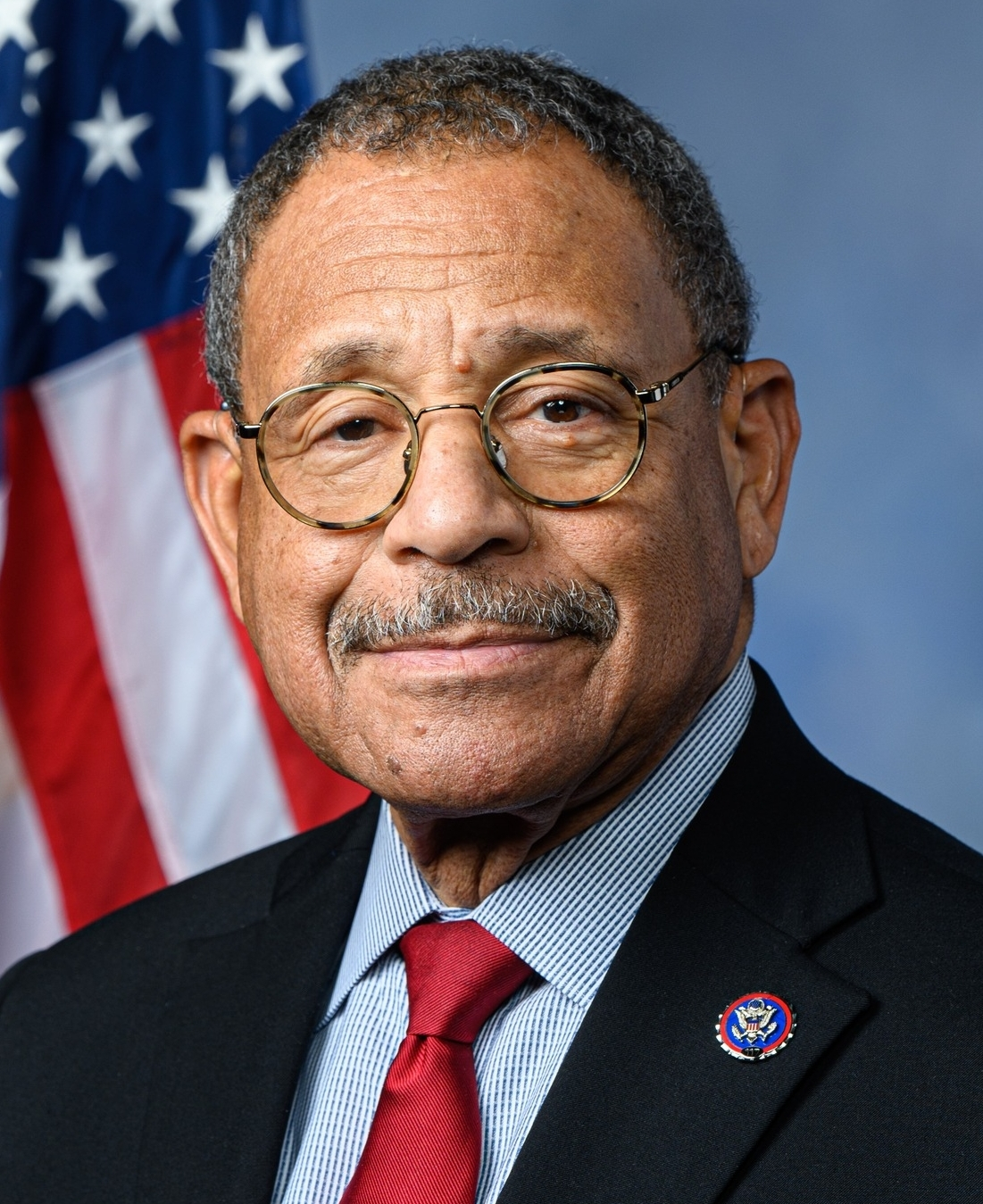

Nominee	Sanford Bishop	Wayne Johnson
Party	Democratic	Republican
Popular vote	176,028	136,473
Percentage	56.3%	43.7%
- Bishop: 50–60% 60–70% 70–80% 80–90% 90–100% Johnson: 50–60% 60–70% 70–80% 80–90% No data
U.S. Representative before election
Sanford Bishop
Democratic
Elected U.S. Representative
Sanford Bishop
Democratic

The 2nd district encompasses the southwest corner of the state, including most of Columbus. The incumbent was Democrat Sanford Bishop, who was re-elected with 55.0% of the vote in 2022.

=== Democratic primary ===
==== Nominee ====
- Sanford Bishop, incumbent U.S. representative

==== Endorsements ====
Sanford Bishop

Organizations

- AIPAC
- With Honor Fund

Labor unions

- National Education Association
- United Auto Workers

==== Fundraising ====
Campaign finance reports as of May 1, 2024
Candidate	Raised	Spent	Cash on hand
Sanford Bishop (D)	$1,179,328	$711,845	$521,700
Source: Federal Election Commission

==== Results ====
Democratic primary results
Party	Candidate	Votes	%
Democratic	Sanford Bishop (incumbent)	46,379	100.0
Total votes		46,379	100.0

=== Republican primary ===
==== Nominee ====
- Wayne Johnson, former chief operating officer of the Office of Federal Student Aid, candidate for this district in 2022, and candidate for U.S. Senate in 2020

==== Eliminated in runoff ====
- Chuck Hand, vice chair of the Taylor County Republican Party, convicted felon, and participant in the January 6 United States Capitol attack

==== Eliminated in primary ====
- Regina Liparoto, substitute teacher
- Michael Nixon, hospital supply chain director

==== Fundraising ====
Campaign finance reports as of May 1, 2024
Candidate	Raised	Spent	Cash on hand
Chuck Hand (R)	$42,761	$42,558	$202
Wayne Johnson (R)	$65,329 (Note: $65,150 of this total was self-funded by Johnson.)	$61,474	$4,414
Michael Nixon (R)	$45,778	$40,086	$5,943
Source: Federal Election Commission

==== Results ====
Results by county: Johnson: 30–40%; 40–50%; 50–60%; Hand: 30–40%; 40–50%; 50–60%; 60–70%; Nixon: 30–40%

Republican primary results
Party	Candidate	Votes	%
Republican	Wayne Johnson	14,152	44.6
Republican	Chuck Hand	10,136	32.0
Republican	Michael Nixon	5,924	18.7
Republican	Regina Liparoto	1,493	4.7
Total votes		31,705	100.0

==== Fundraising ====
Campaign finance reports as of May 29, 2024
Candidate	Raised	Spent	Cash on hand
Chuck Hand (R)	$45,263	$43,265	$1,997
Wayne Johnson (R)	$72,829 (Note: $72,650 of this total was self-funded by Johnson.)	$71,246	$2,142
Source: Federal Election Commission

==== Debate ====
2024 Georgia's 2nd congressional district Republican primary runoff debate
No.	Date	Host	Moderator	Link	Republican	Republican
Key: P Participant A Absent N Not invited I Invited W Withdrawn						
Key: P Participant A Absent N Not invited I Invited W Withdrawn					Chuck Hand	Wayne Johnson
1		Atlanta Press Club	Donna Lowry	YouTube	P	P

==== Results ====
Results by county: Johnson: 50–60%; 60–70%; 70–80%; 80–90%; >90%; Hand: 60–70%; >90%

Republican primary results
Party	Candidate	Votes	%
Republican	Wayne Johnson	7,807	65.8
Republican	Chuck Hand	4,063	34.2
Total votes		11,870	100.0

=== General election ===
==== Predictions ====
Source	Ranking	As of
The Cook Political Report	Solid D	October 31, 2023
Inside Elections	Solid D	March 10, 2023
Sabato's Crystal Ball	Safe D	February 23, 2023
Elections Daily	Safe D	October 10, 2024
CNalysis	Solid D	November 16, 2023
Decision Desk HQ	Safe D	October 11, 2024

==== Polling ====
Poll source	Date(s) administered	Sample size (Note: Key: A – all adults RV – registered voters LV – likely voters V – unclear)	Margin of error	Sanford Bishop (D)	Wayne Johnson (R)	Other/Undecided
Public Policy Polling (D) (Note: Poll sponsored by Bishop's campaign)	October 17–18, 2024	400 (LV)	–	51%	40%	9%
co/efficient (Note: Poll sponsored by Johnson's campaign)	October 3–4, 2024	847 (LV)	± 3.36%	45%	42%	13% (Note: "3rd Party Candidate" with 1%)

==== Results ====
Georgia's 2nd congressional district, 2024
Party	Candidate	Votes	%
Democratic	Sanford Bishop (incumbent)	176,028	56.3
Republican	Wayne Johnson	136,473	43.7
Total votes		312,501	100.0
Democratic hold			

== District 3 ==
2024 Georgia's 3rd congressional district election
- November 5, 2024
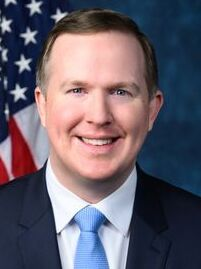

Nominee	Brian Jack	Maura Keller
Party	Republican	Democratic
Popular vote	273,036	138,749
Percentage	66.3%	33.7%
- Jack: 50–60% 60–70% 70–80% 80–90% Keller: 60–70%
U.S. Representative before election
Drew Ferguson
Republican
Elected U.S. Representative
Brian Jack
Republican

The 3rd district comprises central-west Georgia, containing the northern suburbs of Columbus as well as the southwestern suburbs of Atlanta. The incumbent was Republican Drew Ferguson, who was re-elected with 68.6% of the vote in 2022.

=== Republican primary ===
==== Nominee ====
- Brian Jack, senior advisor to the Donald Trump 2024 presidential campaign and former White House political director (2019–2021)

==== Eliminated in runoff ====
- Mike Dugan, former majority leader of the Georgia Senate (2019–2023) from the 30th district (2013–2024)

==== Eliminated in primary ====
- Jim Bennett, retired procurement officer
- Mike Crane, former state senator from the 28th district (2011–2017), candidate for this district in 2016, and nominee for the 13th district in 2010 (endorsed Jack in runoff)
- Philip Singleton, former state representative from the 71st district (2019–2023) and candidate for this district in 2018 (endorsed Jack in runoff)

==== Withdrawn ====
- Ray Blair, insurance agent
- Michael Corbin, telecommunications network integration manager and candidate for the 7th district in 2022 (ran for state house)
- David Jenkins, state representative from the 136th district (2021–present) (ran for re-election)

==== Declined ====
- Drew Ferguson, incumbent U.S. representative

=== Endorsements ===
Mike Crane

U.S. senators

- Ted Cruz, U.S. senator from Texas

Organizations

- Eagle Forum PAC
- Georgia Republican Assembly
Mike Dugan

Statewide officials

- Gary Black, former agriculture commissioner of Georgia (endorsed in runoff)

State legislators

- 21 state senators

Local officials

- 8 sheriffs
Brian Jack

Executive branch officials

- Donald Trump, 45th president of the United States

Statewide officials

- Tyler Harper, agriculture commissioner of Georgia
- Burt Jones, lieutenant governor of Georgia

U.S. representatives

- Mike Collins, U.S. representative from Georgia's 10th congressional district
- Newt Gingrich, former speaker of the U.S. House of Representatives (1995–1999) from Georgia's 6th congressional district (1979–1999)
- Jim Jordan, U.S. representative from Ohio's 4th congressional district

State legislators

- Mike Crane, former state senator from the 28th district (2011–2017)
- Philip Singleton, former state representative from the 71st district (2019–2023)

Individuals

- Kari Lake, former KSAZ-TV news anchor
- Donald Trump Jr., son of former president Donald Trump

Organizations

- Club for Growth
- College Republicans of America
Drew Ferguson (declined)

Organizations

- AIPAC

==== Fundraising ====
Campaign finance reports as of May 1, 2024
Candidate	Raised	Spent	Cash on hand
Jim Bennett (R)	$39,073	$38,428	$644
Mike Crane (R)	$558,641 (Note: $40,000 of this total was self-funded by Crane.)	$211,204	$347,436
Mike Dugan (R)	$398,495	$114,135	$284,359
Brian Jack (R)	$924,838 (Note: $5,220 of this total was self-funded by Jack.)	$568,509	$356,328
Philip Singleton (R)	$154,995	$115,947	$39,048
Source: Federal Election Commission

==== Debate ====
2024 Georgia's 3rd congressional district Republican primary debate
No.	Date	Host	Moderator	Link	Republican	Republican	Republican	Republican	Republican
Key: P Participant A Absent N Not invited I Invited W Withdrawn									
Key: P Participant A Absent N Not invited I Invited W Withdrawn					Jim Bennett	Mike Crane	Mike Dugan	Brian Jack	Philip Singleton
1	Apr. 28, 2024	Atlanta Press Club	Russ Spencer	YouTube	P	P	P	P	P

==== Results ====
Results by county: Jack: 40–50%; 50–60%; Dugan: 50–60%

Republican primary results
Party	Candidate	Votes	%
Republican	Brian Jack	32,877	46.7
Republican	Mike Dugan	17,522	24.9
Republican	Mike Crane	11,182	15.9
Republican	Philip Singleton	4,743	6.7
Republican	Jim Bennett	4,076	5.8
Total votes		70,400	100.0

==== Fundraising ====
Campaign finance reports as of May 29, 2024
Candidate	Raised	Spent	Cash on hand
Mike Dugan (R)	$604,877	$432,402	$172,475
Brian Jack (R)	$1,337,646 (Note: $5,220 of this total was self-funded by Jack.)	$977,581	$360,065
Source: Federal Election Commission

==== Debate ====
2024 Georgia's 3rd congressional district Republican primary runoff debate
No.	Date	Host	Moderator	Link	Republican	Republican
Key: P Participant A Absent N Not invited I Invited W Withdrawn						
Key: P Participant A Absent N Not invited I Invited W Withdrawn					Mike Dugan	Brian Jack
1		Atlanta Press Club	Donna Lowry	YouTube	P	P

==== Results ====
Results by county: Jack: 50–60%; 60–70%; 70–80%; Dugan: 50–60%

Republican primary results
Party	Candidate	Votes	%
Republican	Brian Jack	29,654	62.6
Republican	Mike Dugan	17,693	37.4
Total votes		47,347	100.0

=== Democratic primary ===
==== Nominee ====
- Maura Keller, salon owner

==== Eliminated in primary ====
- Val Almonord, retired podiatrist and nominee for this district in 2020 and 2022

==== Fundraising ====
Campaign finance reports as of May 1, 2024
Candidate	Raised	Spent	Cash on hand
Val Almonord (D)	$27,302 (Note: $20,000 of this total was self-funded by Almonord.)	$25,714	$8,699
Maura Keller (D)	$39,124 (Note: $25,220 of this total was self-funded by Keller.)	$26,729	$12,394
Source: Federal Election Commission

==== Results ====
Democratic primary results
Party	Candidate	Votes	%
Democratic	Maura Keller	13,237	53.0
Democratic	Val Almonord	11,730	47.0
Total votes		24,967	100.0

=== General election ===
==== Predictions ====
Source	Ranking	As of
The Cook Political Report	Solid R	October 31, 2023
Inside Elections	Solid R	March 10, 2023
Sabato's Crystal Ball	Safe R	February 23, 2023
Elections Daily	Safe R	June 8, 2023
CNalysis	Solid R	November 16, 2023
Decision Desk HQ	Solid R	June 1, 2024

==== Debate ====
2024 Georgia's 3rd congressional district debate
No.	Date	Host	Moderator	Link	Republican	Democratic
Key: P Participant A Absent N Not invited I Invited W Withdrawn						
Key: P Participant A Absent N Not invited I Invited W Withdrawn					Brian Jack	Maura Keller
1	Oct. 2, 2018	Atlanta Press Club	Pamela Kirkland	YouTube	P	P

==== Results ====
Georgia's 3rd congressional district, 2024
Party	Candidate	Votes	%
Republican	Brian Jack	273,036	66.3
Democratic	Maura Keller	138,749	33.7
Total votes		411,785	100.0
Republican hold			

== District 4 ==
2024 Georgia's 4th congressional district election
- November 5, 2024
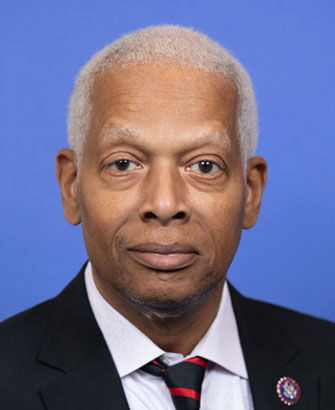

Nominee	Hank Johnson	Eugene Yu
Party	Democratic	Republican
Popular vote	229,058	74,009
Percentage	75.6%	24.4%
- Johnson: 50–60% 60–70% 70–80% 80–90% >90% Yu: 50–60% 60–70%
U.S. Representative before election
Hank Johnson
Democratic
Elected U.S. Representative
Hank Johnson
Democratic

The 4th district is based in the southeast suburbs and regions of Atlanta. The incumbent was Democrat Hank Johnson, who was re-elected with 78.5% of the vote in 2022.

=== Democratic primary ===
==== Nominee ====
- Hank Johnson, incumbent U.S. representative

==== Endorsements ====
Hank Johnson

Labor unions

- Association of Flight Attendants
- National Education Association
- United Auto Workers

==== Fundraising ====
Campaign finance reports as of May 1, 2024
Candidate	Raised	Spent	Cash on hand
Hank Johnson (D)	$390,673	$397,770	$56,688
Source: Federal Election Commission

==== Results ====
Democratic primary results
Party	Candidate	Votes	%
Democratic	Hank Johnson (incumbent)	53,269	100.0
Total votes		53,269	100.0

=== Republican primary ===
==== Nominee ====
- Eugene Yu, retired businessman and perennial candidate

==== Fundraising ====
Campaign finance reports as of March 31, 2024
Candidate	Raised	Spent	Cash on hand
Eugene Yu (R)	$39,582	$12,000	$48,608
Source: Federal Election Commission

==== Results ====
Republican primary results
Party	Candidate	Votes	%
Republican	Eugene Yu	9,086	100.0
Total votes		9,086	100.0

=== Third-party and independent candidates ===
==== Declared ====
- Ansel Postell (Independent), entrepreneur

=== General election ===
==== Predictions ====
Source	Ranking	As of
The Cook Political Report	Solid D	October 31, 2023
Inside Elections	Solid D	March 10, 2023
Sabato's Crystal Ball	Safe D	February 23, 2023
Elections Daily	Safe D	June 8, 2023
CNalysis	Solid D	November 16, 2023
Decision Desk HQ	Solid D	June 1, 2024

==== Results ====
Georgia's 4th congressional district, 2024
Party	Candidate	Votes	%
Democratic	Hank Johnson (incumbent)	229,290	75.6
Republican	Eugene Yu	74,071	24.4
Total votes		303,361	100.0
Democratic hold			

== District 5 ==
2024 Georgia's 5th congressional district election
- November 5, 2024
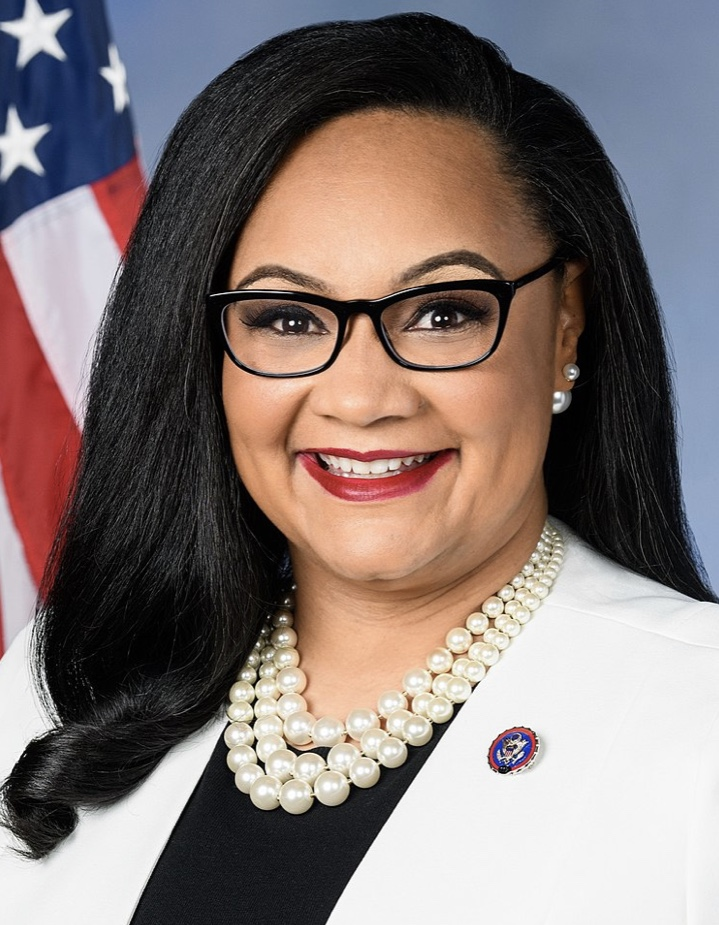

Nominee	Nikema Williams	John Salvesen
Party	Democratic	Republican
Popular vote	294,180	49,150
Percentage	85.7%	14.3%
- Williams: 50–60% 60–70% 70–80% 80–90% >90% No votes
U.S. Representative before election
Nikema Williams
Democratic
Elected U.S. Representative
Nikema Williams
Democratic

The 5th district comprises most of central Atlanta. The incumbent was Democrat Nikema Williams, who was re-elected with 82.5% of the vote in 2022.

=== Democratic primary ===
==== Nominee ====
- Nikema Williams, incumbent U.S. representative

==== Endorsements ====
Nikema Williams

Organizations

- AIPAC
- Democratic Majority for Israel
- Feminist Majority PAC
- Giffords
- Jewish Democratic Council of America
- Planned Parenthood Action Fund
- Population Connection Action Fund
- Vote Mama

Labor unions

- Association of Flight Attendants
- National Education Association
- United Auto Workers

==== Fundraising ====
Campaign finance reports as of May 1, 2024
Candidate	Raised	Spent	Cash on hand
Nikema Williams (D)	$632,033	$576,264	$59,836
Source: Federal Election Commission

==== Results ====
Democratic primary results
Party	Candidate	Votes	%
Democratic	Nikema Williams (incumbent)	69,116	100.0
Total votes		69,116	100.0

=== Republican primary ===
==== Nominee ====
- John Salvesen, carpenter

==== Results ====
Republican primary results
Party	Candidate	Votes	%
Republican	John Salvesen	3,939	100.0
Total votes		3,939	100.0

=== Third-party and independent candidates ===
==== Declared ====
- Lisa Potash (Socialist Workers Party), political organizer and perennial candidate

=== General election ===
==== Predictions ====
Source	Ranking	As of
The Cook Political Report	Solid D	October 31, 2023
Inside Elections	Solid D	March 10, 2023
Sabato's Crystal Ball	Safe D	February 23, 2023
Elections Daily	Safe D	June 8, 2023
CNalysis	Solid D	November 16, 2023
Decision Desk HQ	Solid D	June 1, 2024

==== Results ====
Georgia's 5th congressional district, 2024
Party	Candidate	Votes	%
Democratic	Nikema Williams (incumbent)	294,470	85.7
Republican	John Salvesen	49,221	14.3
Total votes		343,691	100.0
Democratic hold			

== District 6 ==
2024 Georgia's 6th congressional district election
- November 5, 2024
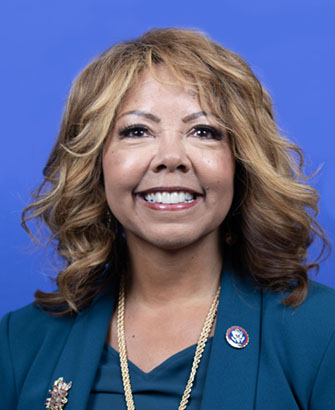

Nominee	Lucy McBath	Jeff Criswell
Party	Democratic	Republican
Popular vote	277,027	93,909
Percentage	74.7%	25.3%
- McBath: 50–60% 60–70% 70–80% 80–90% >90% Criswell: 50–60% 60–70% >90% Tie: 50% No votes
U.S. Representative before election
Lucy McBath
Democratic
Elected U.S. Representative
Lucy McBath
Democratic

The 6th district comprises suburbs and exurbs of Atlanta. The incumbent was Democrat Lucy McBath, who was re-elected with 61.1% of the vote in 2022.

=== Democratic primary ===
==== Nominee ====
- Lucy McBath, incumbent U.S. representative

==== Eliminated in primary ====
- Jerica Richardson, Cobb County commissioner
- Mandisha Thomas, state representative

==== Endorsements ====
Lucy McBath

U.S representatives

- Gabby Giffords, U.S. representative from Arizona's 8th congressional district (2007–2012)

Organizations

- AIPAC
- Bend the Arc
- Brady PAC
- Democratic Majority for Israel
- EMILY's List
- End Citizens United
- Everytown for Gun Safety
- Feminist Majority PAC
- Giffords
- Joint Action Committee for Political Affairs
- League of Conservation Voters
- National Women's Political Caucus
- Natural Resources Defense Council
- Planned Parenthood Action Fund
- Population Connection Action Fund
- Pro-Israel America

Labor unions

- National Education Association
- United Auto Workers

==== Fundraising ====
Campaign finance reports as of May 1, 2024
Candidate	Raised	Spent	Cash on hand
Lucy McBath (D)	$1,632,917	$1,050,862	$1,316,358
Jerica Richardson (D)	$112,694 (Note: $5,220 of this total was self-funded by Richardson.)	$113,991	$0
Mandisha Thomas (D)	$18,400 (Note: $13,475 of this total was self-funded by Thomas.)	$13,829	$4,570
Source: Federal Election Commission

==== Debate ====
2024 Georgia's 6th congressional district Democratic primary debate
No.	Date	Host	Moderator	Link	Democratic	Democratic	Democratic
Key: P Participant A Absent N Not invited I Invited W Withdrawn							
Key: P Participant A Absent N Not invited I Invited W Withdrawn					Lucy McBath	Jerica Richardson	Mandisha Thomas
1	Apr. 28, 2024	Atlanta Press Club	Pamela Kirkland	YouTube	A	P	P

==== Results ====
Democratic primary results
Party	Candidate	Votes	%
Democratic	Lucy McBath (incumbent)	60,837	84.8
Democratic	Jerica Richardson	6,699	9.3
Democratic	Mandisha Thomas	4,247	5.9
Total votes		71,783	100.0

=== Republican primary ===
==== Nominee ====
- Jeff Criswell, teacher and baseball importing company founder

==== Withdrawn ====
- Rich McCormick, U.S. representative from the 7th district (ran in the 7th district)

==== Endorsements ====
Jeff Criswell

Organizations

- Log Cabin Republicans PAC

==== Fundraising ====
Campaign finance reports as of May 1, 2024
Candidate	Raised	Spent	Cash on hand
Jeff Criswell (R)	$14,385 (Note: $12,450 of this total was self-funded by Criswell.)	$14,197	$188
Source: Federal Election Commission

==== Results ====
Republican primary results
Party	Candidate	Votes	%
Republican	Jeff Criswell	11,983	100.0
Total votes		11,983	100.0

=== General election ===
==== Predictions ====
Source	Ranking	As of
The Cook Political Report	Solid D	October 31, 2023
Inside Elections	Solid D	March 10, 2023
Sabato's Crystal Ball	Safe D	February 23, 2023
Elections Daily	Safe D	June 8, 2023
CNalysis	Solid D	November 16, 2023
Decision Desk HQ	Solid D	June 1, 2024

==== Results ====
Georgia's 6th congressional district, 2024
Party	Candidate	Votes	%
Democratic	Lucy McBath (incumbent)	277,027	74.7
Republican	Jeff Criswell	93,909	25.3
Total votes		370,936	100.0
Democratic hold			

== District 7 ==
2024 Georgia's 7th congressional district election
- November 5, 2024
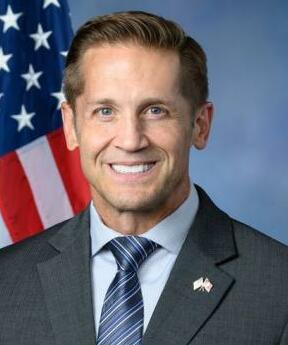

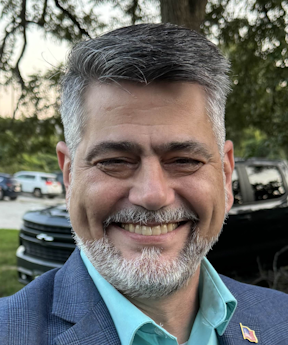
Nominee	Rich McCormick	Bob Christian
Party	Republican	Democratic
Popular vote	275,907	149,535
Percentage	64.9%	35.1%
- McCormick: 50–60% 60–70% 70–80% 80–90% >90% Christian: 50–60% 60–70% 70–80% >90% No votes
U.S. Representative before election
Rich McCormick
Republican
Elected U.S. Representative
Rich McCormick
Republican

The 7th district comprises suburban and rural regions north of Atlanta. The incumbent was Republican Rich McCormick, who was elected with 62.2% of the vote in 2022.

=== Republican primary ===
==== Nominee ====
- Rich McCormick, incumbent U.S. representative

==== Withdrawn ====
- Michael Corbin, telecommunications network integration manager and candidate for this district in 2022 (ran in the 3rd district)
- Jeff Criswell, teacher and baseball importing company founder (ran in the 6th district)

==== Endorsements ====
Rich McCormick

Organizations

- AIPAC
- Hindu American PAC
- With Honor Fund

==== Fundraising ====
Campaign finance reports as of May 1, 2024
Candidate	Raised	Spent	Cash on hand
Rich McCormick (R)	$1,450,440	$1,158,164	$397,078
Source: Federal Election Commission

==== Results ====
Republican primary results
Party	Candidate	Votes	%
Republican	Rich McCormick (incumbent)	47,063	100.0
Total votes		47,063	100.0

=== Democratic primary ===
==== Nominee ====
- Bob Christian, restaurant manager and nominee for this district in 2022

==== Declined ====
- Lucy McBath, U.S. representative from the 6th district (ran in the 6th district)

==== Fundraising ====
Campaign finance reports as of March 31, 2024
Candidate	Raised	Spent	Cash on hand
Bob Christian (D)	$10,998	$0	$15
Source: Federal Election Commission

==== Results ====
Democratic primary results
Party	Candidate	Votes	%
Democratic	Bob Christian	20,958	100.0
Total votes		20,958	100.0

=== General election ===
==== Predictions ====
Source	Ranking	As of
The Cook Political Report	Solid R	December 29, 2023
Inside Elections	Solid R	March 10, 2023
Sabato's Crystal Ball	Safe R	February 23, 2023
Elections Daily	Safe R	June 8, 2023
CNalysis	Solid R	November 16, 2023
Decision Desk HQ	Solid R	June 1, 2024

==== Results ====
Georgia's 7th congressional district, 2024
Party	Candidate	Votes	%
Republican	Rich McCormick (incumbent)	275,907	64.9
Democratic	Bob Christian	149,535	35.1
Total votes		425,442	100.0
Republican hold			

== District 8 ==
2024 Georgia's 8th congressional district election
- November 5, 2024
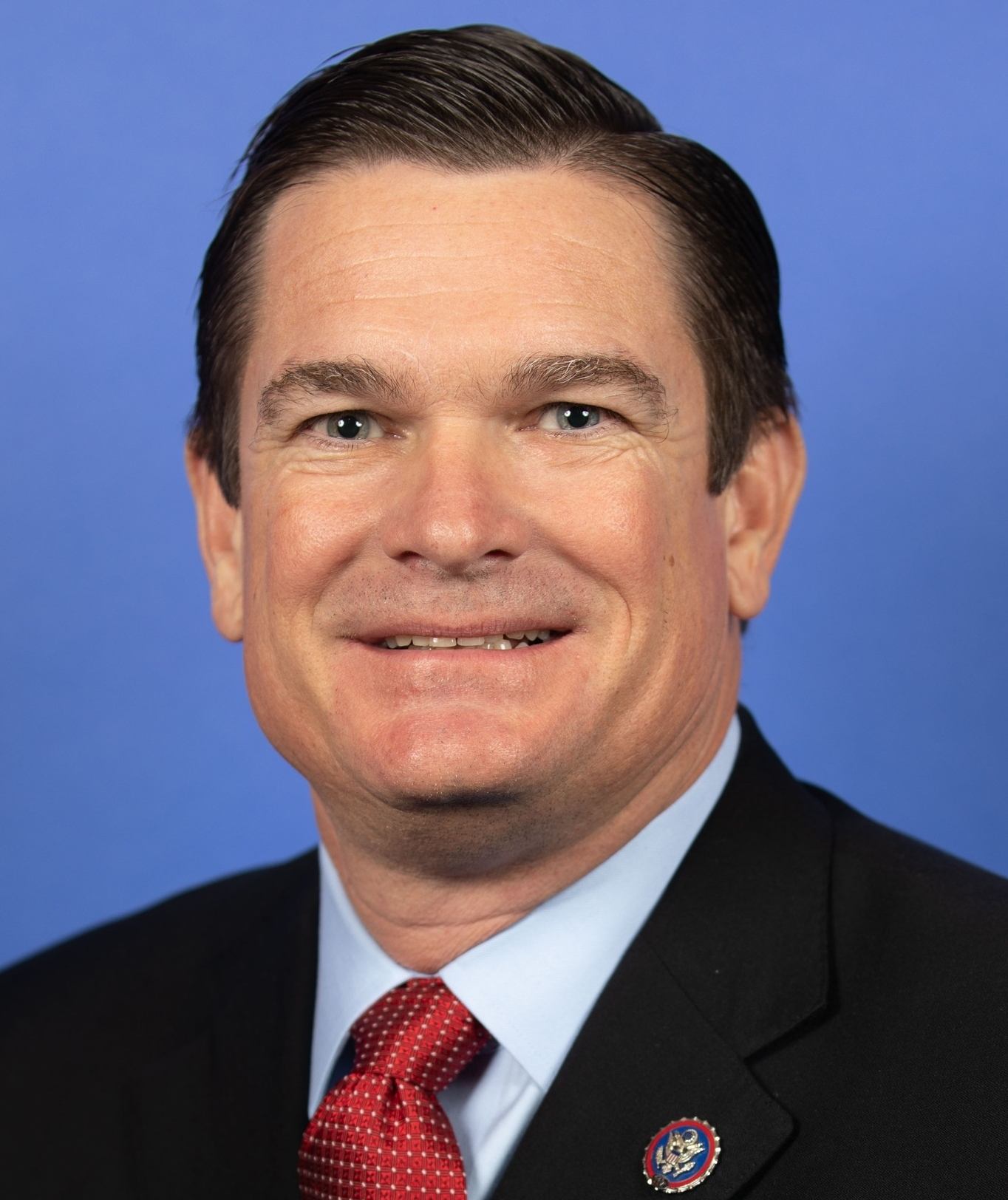

Nominee	Austin Scott	Darrius Butler
Party	Republican	Democratic
Popular vote	231,537	104,433
Percentage	68.9%	31.1%
- Scott: 50–60% 60–70% 70–80% 80–90% >90% Butler: 50–60% 60–70% 70–80% 80–90%
U.S. Representative before election
Austin Scott
Republican
Elected U.S. Representative
Austin Scott
Republican

The 8th district comprises a large sliver of the southern part of the state. The incumbent was Republican Austin Scott, who was re-elected with 68.6% of the vote in 2022.

=== Republican primary ===
==== Nominee ====
- Austin Scott, incumbent U.S. representative

==== Endorsements ====
Austin Scott

Organizations

- AIPAC

==== Fundraising ====
Campaign finance reports as of May 1, 2024
Candidate	Raised	Spent	Cash on hand
Austin Scott (R)	$807,141	$622,999	$915,105
Source: Federal Election Commission

==== Results ====
Republican primary results
Party	Candidate	Votes	%
Republican	Austin Scott (incumbent)	59,537	100.0
Total votes		59,537	100.0

=== Democratic primary ===
==== Nominee ====
- Darrius Butler, teacher and nominee for this district in 2022

==== Eliminated in primary ====
- Vince Watkins, author and editor

==== Fundraising ====
Campaign finance reports as of May 1, 2024
Candidate	Raised	Spent	Cash on hand
Vince Watkins (D)	$5,433 (Note: $5,320 of this total was self-funded by Watkins.)	$5,252	$181
Source: Federal Election Commission

==== Results ====
Results by county: Butler: 50—60%; 60—70%; 70—80%; 80—90%; Watkins: 50—60%

Democratic primary results
Party	Candidate	Votes	%
Democratic	Darrius Butler	15,755	71.6
Democratic	Vince Watkins	6,236	28.4
Total votes		21,991	100.0

=== General election ===
==== Predictions ====
Source	Ranking	As of
The Cook Political Report	Solid R	October 31, 2023
Inside Elections	Solid R	March 10, 2023
Sabato's Crystal Ball	Safe R	February 23, 2023
Elections Daily	Safe R	June 8, 2023
CNalysis	Solid R	November 16, 2023
Decision Desk HQ	Solid R	June 1, 2024

==== Results ====
Georgia's 8th congressional district, 2024
Party	Candidate	Votes	%
Republican	Austin Scott (incumbent)	231,547	68.9
Democratic	Darrius Butler	104,434	31.1
Total votes		335,981	100.0
Republican hold			

== District 9 ==
2024 Georgia's 9th congressional district election
- November 5, 2024
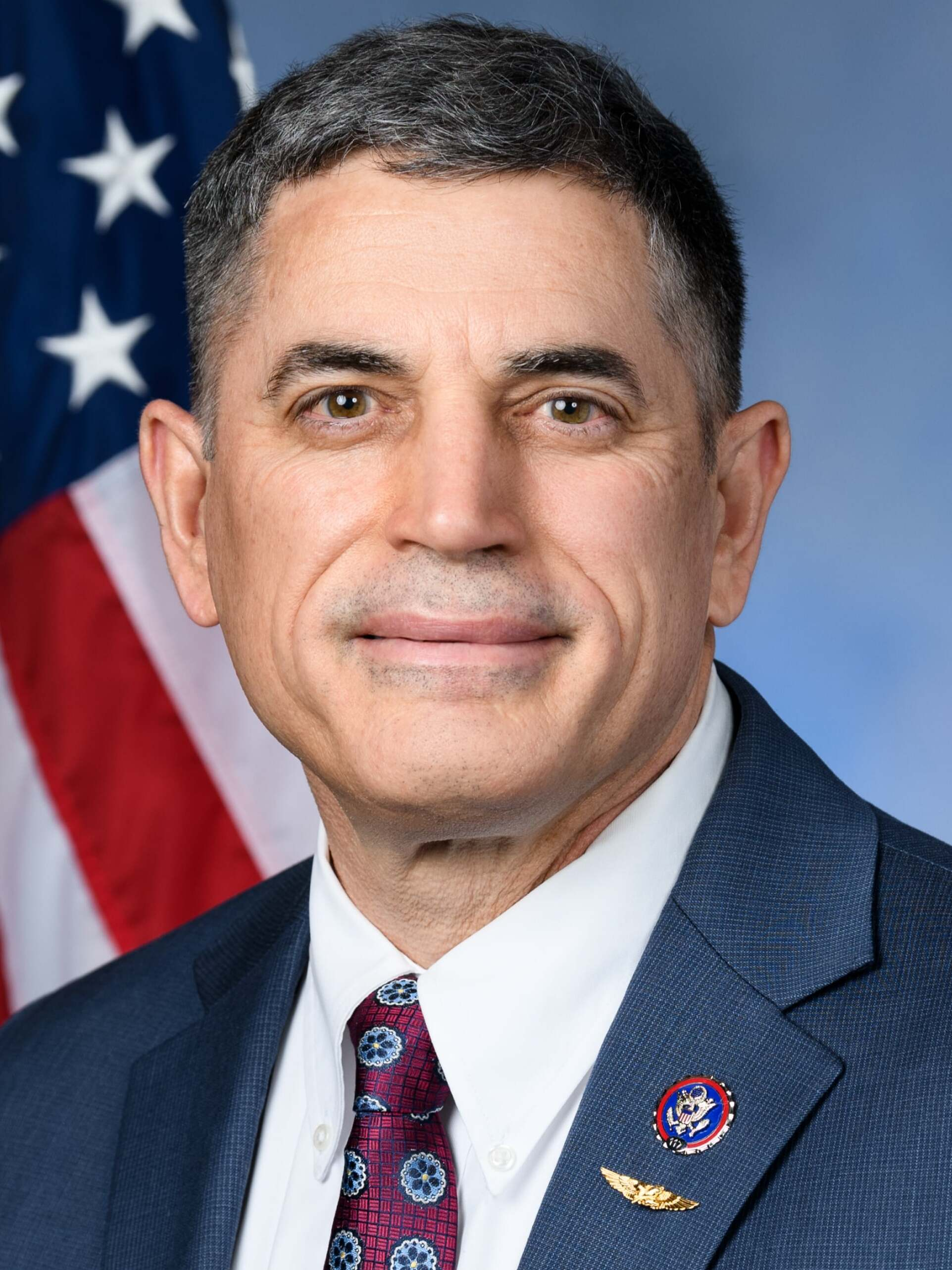

Nominee	Andrew Clyde	Tambrei Cash
Party	Republican	Democratic
Popular vote	271,062	121,754
Percentage	69.0%	31.0%
- Clyde: 50–60% 60–70% 70–80% 80–90% >90% Cash: 50–60% 60–70% 70–80%
U.S. Representative before election
Andrew Clyde
Republican
Elected U.S. Representative
Andrew Clyde
Republican

The 9th district encompasses the northeast part of the state. The incumbent was Republican Andrew Clyde, who was re-elected with 72.4% of the vote in 2022.

=== Republican primary ===
==== Nominee ====
- Andrew Clyde, incumbent U.S. representative

==== Fundraising ====
Campaign finance reports as of May 1, 2024
Candidate	Raised	Spent	Cash on hand
Andrew Clyde (R)	$338,167 (Note: $46,500 of this total was self-funded by Clyde.)	$284,026	$78,946
Source: Federal Election Commission

==== Results ====
Republican primary results
Party	Candidate	Votes	%
Republican	Andrew Clyde (incumbent)	71,224	100.0
Total votes		71,224	100.0

=== Democratic primary ===
==== Nominee ====
- Tambrei Cash, stay-at-home mom and former flooring contractor

==== Fundraising ====
Campaign finance reports as of May 1, 2024
Candidate	Raised	Spent	Cash on hand
Tambrei Cash (D)	$40,777	$30,964	$649
Source: Federal Election Commission

==== Results ====
Democratic primary results
Party	Candidate	Votes	%
Democratic	Tambrei Cash	16,654	100.0
Total votes		16,654	100.0

=== General election ===
==== Predictions ====
Source	Ranking	As of
The Cook Political Report	Solid R	October 31, 2023
Inside Elections	Solid R	March 10, 2023
Sabato's Crystal Ball	Safe R	February 23, 2023
Elections Daily	Safe R	June 8, 2023
CNalysis	Solid R	November 16, 2023
Decision Desk HQ	Solid R	June 1, 2024

==== Results ====
Georgia's 9th congressional district, 2024
Party	Candidate	Votes	%
Republican	Andrew Clyde (incumbent)	271,062	69.0
Democratic	Tambrei Cash	121,754	31.0
Total votes		392,816	100.0
Republican hold			

== District 10 ==
2024 Georgia's 10th congressional district election
- November 8, 2024
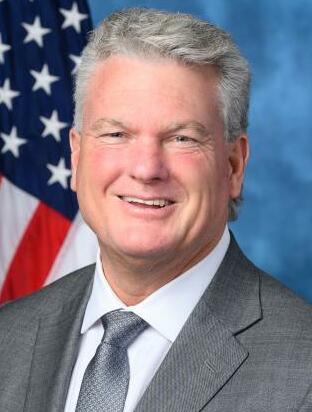

Nominee	Mike Collins	Lexy Doherty
Party	Republican	Democratic
Popular vote	256,442	150,274
Percentage	63.1%	36.9%
- Collins: 50–60% 60–70% 70–80% 80–90% >90% Doherty: 50–60% 60–70% 70–80% 80–90%
U.S. Representative before election
Mike Collins
Republican
Elected U.S. Representative
Mike Collins
Republican

The 10th district encompasses a large portion of the central-east part of the state. The incumbent was Republican Mike Collins, who was elected with 64.5% of the vote in 2022.

=== Republican primary ===
==== Nominee ====
- Mike Collins, incumbent U.S. representative

==== Fundraising ====
Campaign finance reports as of May 1, 2024
Candidate	Raised	Spent	Cash on hand
Mike Collins (R)	$1,022,230	$774,688	$444,612
Source: Federal Election Commission

==== Results ====
Republican primary results
Party	Candidate	Votes	%
Republican	Mike Collins (incumbent)	62,109	100.0
Total votes		62,109	100.0

=== Democratic primary ===
==== Nominee ====
- Lexy Doherty, educational consultant

==== Eliminated in primary ====
- Jessica Fore, realtor and candidate for this district in 2022

==== Fundraising ====
Campaign finance reports as of May 1, 2024
Candidate	Raised	Spent	Cash on hand
Lexy Doherty (D) (Note: Did not file for pre-primary deadline)	$31,147 (Note: $10,000 of this total was self-funded by Doherty.)	$30,216	$931
Jessica Fore (D)	$8,801	$9,472	$0
Source: Federal Election Commission

==== Results ====
Democratic primary results
Party	Candidate	Votes	%
Democratic	Lexy Doherty	18,040	59.0
Democratic	Jessica Fore	12,532	41.0
Total votes		30,572	100.0

=== General election ===
==== Predictions ====
Source	Ranking	As of
The Cook Political Report	Solid R	October 31, 2023
Inside Elections	Solid R	March 10, 2023
Sabato's Crystal Ball	Safe R	February 23, 2023
Elections Daily	Safe R	June 8, 2023
CNalysis	Solid R	November 16, 2023
Decision Desk HQ	Solid R	June 1, 2024

==== Results ====
Georgia's 10th congressional district, 2024
Party	Candidate	Votes	%
Republican	Mike Collins (incumbent)	256,442	63.1
Democratic	Lexy Doherty	150,274	36.9
Total votes		406,716	100.0
Republican hold			

== District 11 ==
2024 Georgia's 11th congressional district election
- November 5, 2024
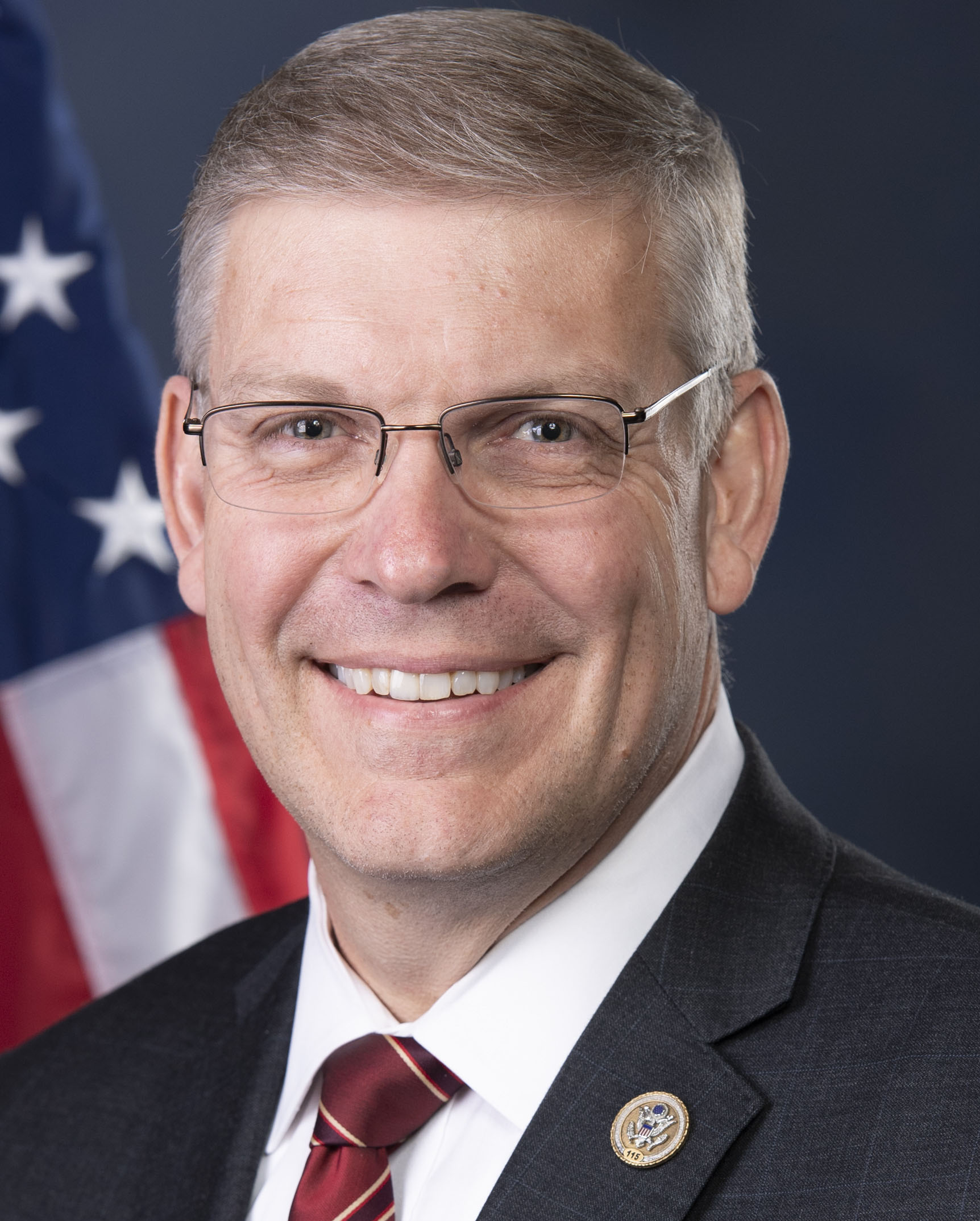

Nominee	Barry Loudermilk	Kate Stamper
Party	Republican	Democratic
Popular vote	269,849	131,061
Percentage	65.6%	31.9%
- Loudermilk: 50–60% 60–70% 70–80% 80–90% >90% Stamper: 50–60% 60–70% 70–80% Tie: 50%
U.S. Representative before election
Barry Loudermilk
Republican
Elected U.S. Representative
Barry Loudermilk
Republican

The 11th district is based in the northern exurbs of Atlanta. The incumbent was Republican Barry Loudermilk, who was re-elected with 62.6% of the vote in 2022.

=== Republican primary ===
==== Nominee ====
- Barry Loudermilk, incumbent U.S. representative

==== Eliminated in primary ====
- Lori Pesta, event planner and former chair of the Cherokee County Republican Party
- Mike Pons, retired pilot

==== Endorsements ====
Barry Loudermilk

Organizations

- AIPAC
- National Rifle Association Political Victory Fund
Mike Pons

Organizations

- Georgia Republican Assembly

==== Fundraising ====
Campaign finance reports as of May 1, 2024
Candidate	Raised	Spent	Cash on hand
Barry Loudermilk (R)	$489,068	$429,224	$329,933
Mike Pons (R)	$9,002 (Note: $7,809 of this total was self-funded by Pons.)	$14,922	$0
Source: Federal Election Commission

==== Results ====
Republican primary results
Party	Candidate	Votes	%
Republican	Barry Loudermilk (incumbent)	46,567	86.1
Republican	Mike Pons	4,912	9.1
Republican	Lori Pesta	2,629	4.9
Total votes		54,108	100.0

=== Democratic primary ===
After the primary, the Georgia Democratic Party chose not to endorse the primary winner Kate Stamper due to her right-wing policy stances on immigration, same-sex marriage and transgender rights. Instead, they endorsed Tracey Verhoeven, who ran as a write-in candidate in the general election.

==== Nominee ====
- Kate Stamper, attorney

==== Eliminated in primary ====
- Antonio Daza, ballroom dance instructor and nominee for this district in 2022

==== Endorsements ====
Antonio Daza

Organizations

- Vote Common Good

==== Fundraising ====
Campaign finance reports as of May 1, 2024
Candidate	Raised	Spent	Cash on hand
Antonio Daza (D)	$36,638	$30,333	$6,305
Kate Stamper (D)	$16,356 (Note: $16,231 of this total was self-funded by Pons.)	$15,835	$6,082
Source: Federal Election Commission

==== Results ====
Democratic primary results
Party	Candidate	Votes	%
Democratic	Kate Stamper	13,615	56.6
Democratic	Antonio Daza	10,449	43.4
Total votes		24,064	100.0

=== General election ===
Tracey Verhoeven (write-in)

Organizations

- Georgia Democratic Party

==== Predictions ====
Source	Ranking	As of
The Cook Political Report	Solid R	October 31, 2023
Inside Elections	Solid R	March 10, 2023
Sabato's Crystal Ball	Safe R	February 23, 2023
Elections Daily	Safe R	June 8, 2023
CNalysis	Solid R	November 16, 2023
Decision Desk HQ	Solid R	June 1, 2024

==== Results ====
Georgia's 11th congressional district, 2024
Party	Candidate	Votes	%
Republican	Barry Loudermilk (incumbent)	269,849	65.6
Democratic	Kate Stamper	131,064	31.9
Democratic	Tracey Verhoeven (write-in)	10,226	2.5
Total votes		411,139	100.0
Republican hold			

== District 12 ==
2024 Georgia's 12th congressional district election
- November 5, 2024
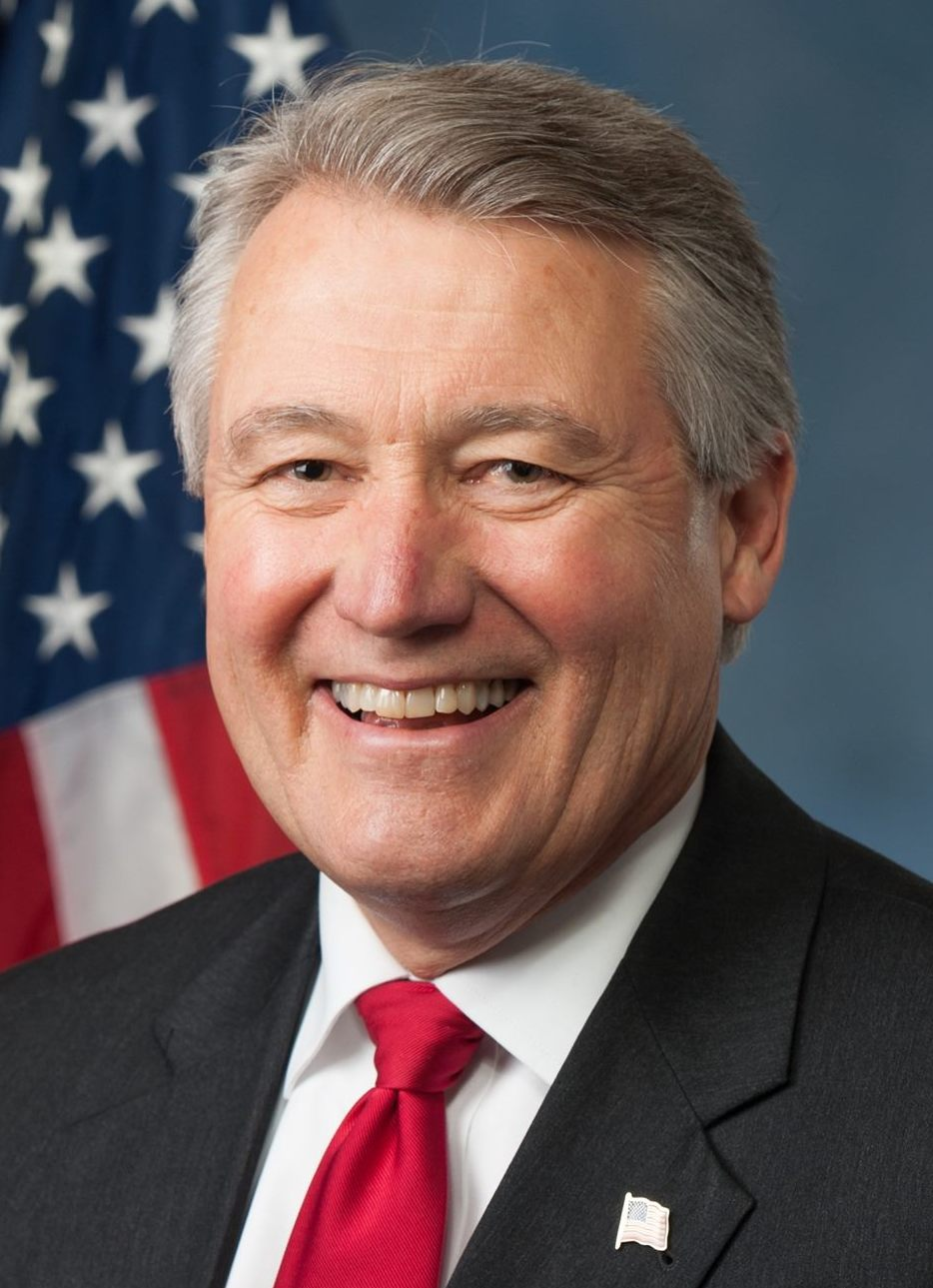

Nominee	Rick Allen	Liz Johnson
Party	Republican	Democratic
Popular vote	205,849	135,417
Percentage	60.3%	39.7%
- Allen: 50–60% 60–70% 70–80% 80–90% >90% Johnson: 50–60% 60–70% 70–80% 80–90% >90%
U.S. Representative before election
Rick Allen
Republican
Elected U.S. Representative
Rick Allen
Republican

The 12th district is based in the central-east part of the state, surrounding Augusta. The incumbent was Republican Rick Allen, who was re-elected with 59.6% of the vote in 2022.

=== Republican primary ===
==== Nominee ====
- Rick Allen, incumbent U.S. representative

==== Endorsements ====
Rick Allen

Organizations

- AIPAC

==== Fundraising ====
Campaign finance reports as of May 1, 2024
Candidate	Raised	Spent	Cash on hand
Rick Allen (R)	$823,698	$695,693	$987,249
Source: Federal Election Commission

==== Results ====
Republican primary results
Party	Candidate	Votes	%
Republican	Rick Allen (incumbent)	49,806	100.0
Total votes		49,806	100.0

=== Democratic primary ===
==== Nominee ====
- Liz Johnson, former Democratic National Committee member and nominee for this district in 2020 and 2022

==== Eliminated in primary ====
- Daniel Jackson, youth mentor

==== Fundraising ====
Campaign finance reports as of May 1, 2024
Candidate	Raised	Spent	Cash on hand
Liz Johnson (D)	$11,111	$3,713	$8,119
Source: Federal Election Commission

==== Results ====
Results by county: Johnson: 50—60%; 60—70%; 70—80%; Jackson: 50—60%

Democratic primary results
Party	Candidate	Votes	%
Democratic	Liz Johnson	23,358	59.0
Democratic	Daniel Jackson	16,238	41.0
Total votes		39,596	100.0

=== General election ===
==== Predictions ====
Source	Ranking	As of
The Cook Political Report	Solid R	October 31, 2023
Inside Elections	Solid R	March 10, 2023
Sabato's Crystal Ball	Safe R	February 23, 2023
Elections Daily	Safe R	June 8, 2023
CNalysis	Solid R	November 16, 2023
Decision Desk HQ	Solid R	June 1, 2024

==== Results ====
Georgia's 12th congressional district, 2024
Party	Candidate	Votes	%
Republican	Rick Allen (incumbent)	205,849	60.3
Democratic	Liz Johnson	135,417	39.7
Total votes		341,266	100.0
Republican hold			

== District 13 ==
2024 Georgia's 13th congressional district election
- November 5, 2024
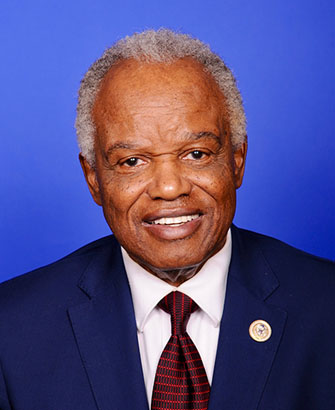

Nominee	David Scott	Jonathan Chavez
Party	Democratic	Republican
Popular vote	256,902	100,730
Percentage	71.8%	28.2%
- Scott: 50–60% 60–70% 70–80% 80–90% >90% Chavez: 50–60%
U.S. Representative before election
David Scott
Democratic
Elected U.S. Representative
David Scott
Democratic

The 13th district is based in the southwest suburbs and exurbs of Atlanta. The incumbent was Democrat David Scott, who was re-elected with 81.8% of the vote in 2022.

=== Democratic primary ===
==== Nominee ====
- David Scott, incumbent U.S. representative

==== Eliminated in primary ====
- Mark Baker, former South Fulton city councilor and candidate for this district in 2022
- Marcus Flowers, account manager and nominee for the 14th district in 2022
- Brian Johnson, attorney
- Uloma Kama, physician and perennial candidate
- Rashid Malik, senior care company owner and perennial candidate
- Karen Rene, former East Point city councilor and former Georgia state director for the Working Families Party

==== Endorsements ====
David Scott

Organizations

- AIPAC
- Democratic Majority for Israel

Labor unions

- National Education Association
- United Auto Workers

==== Fundraising ====
Campaign finance reports as of May 1, 2024
Candidate	Raised	Spent	Cash on hand
Marcus Flowers (D)	$180,272 (Note: $15,000 of this total was self-funded by Flowers.)	$171,907	$8,365
Uloma Kama (D)	$54,190	$23,086	$9,421
David Scott (D)	$935,984 (Note: $45,000 of this total was self-funded by Scott.)	$1,091,000	$481,594
Source: Federal Election Commission

==== Results ====
Democratic primary results
Party	Candidate	Votes	%
Democratic	David Scott (incumbent)	37,135	57.6
Democratic	Mark Baker	7,480	11.6
Democratic	Marcus Flowers	6,439	10.0
Democratic	Karen Rene	5,859	9.1
Democratic	Brian Johnson	3,201	5.0
Democratic	Rashid Malik	3,073	4.8
Democratic	Uloma Kama	1,274	2.0
Total votes		64,461	100.0

=== Republican primary ===
==== Nominee ====
- Jonathan Chavez, medical office manager and nominee for the 4th district in 2022

==== Eliminated in primary ====
- Johsie Fletcher, receptionist and nominee for the 4th district in 2020

==== Fundraising ====
Campaign finance reports as of May 1, 2024
Candidate	Raised	Spent	Cash on hand
Johsie Fletcher (R)	$5,550 (Note: $3,700 of this total was self-funded by Fletcher.)	$5,640	$0
Source: Federal Election Commission

==== Results ====
Republican primary results
Party	Candidate	Votes	%
Republican	Jonathan Chavez	10,344	68.8
Republican	Johsie Fletcher	4,699	31.2
Total votes		15,043	100.0

=== General election ===
==== Predictions ====
Source	Ranking	As of
The Cook Political Report	Solid D	October 31, 2023
Inside Elections	Solid D	March 10, 2023
Sabato's Crystal Ball	Safe D	February 23, 2023
Elections Daily	Safe D	June 8, 2023
CNalysis	Solid D	November 16, 2023
Decision Desk HQ	Solid D	June 1, 2024

==== Results ====
Georgia's 13th congressional district, 2024
Party	Candidate	Votes	%
Democratic	David Scott (incumbent)	256,902	71.8
Republican	Jonathan Chavez	100,730	28.2
Total votes		357,632	100.0
Democratic hold			

== District 14 ==
2024 Georgia's 14th congressional district election
- November 5, 2024
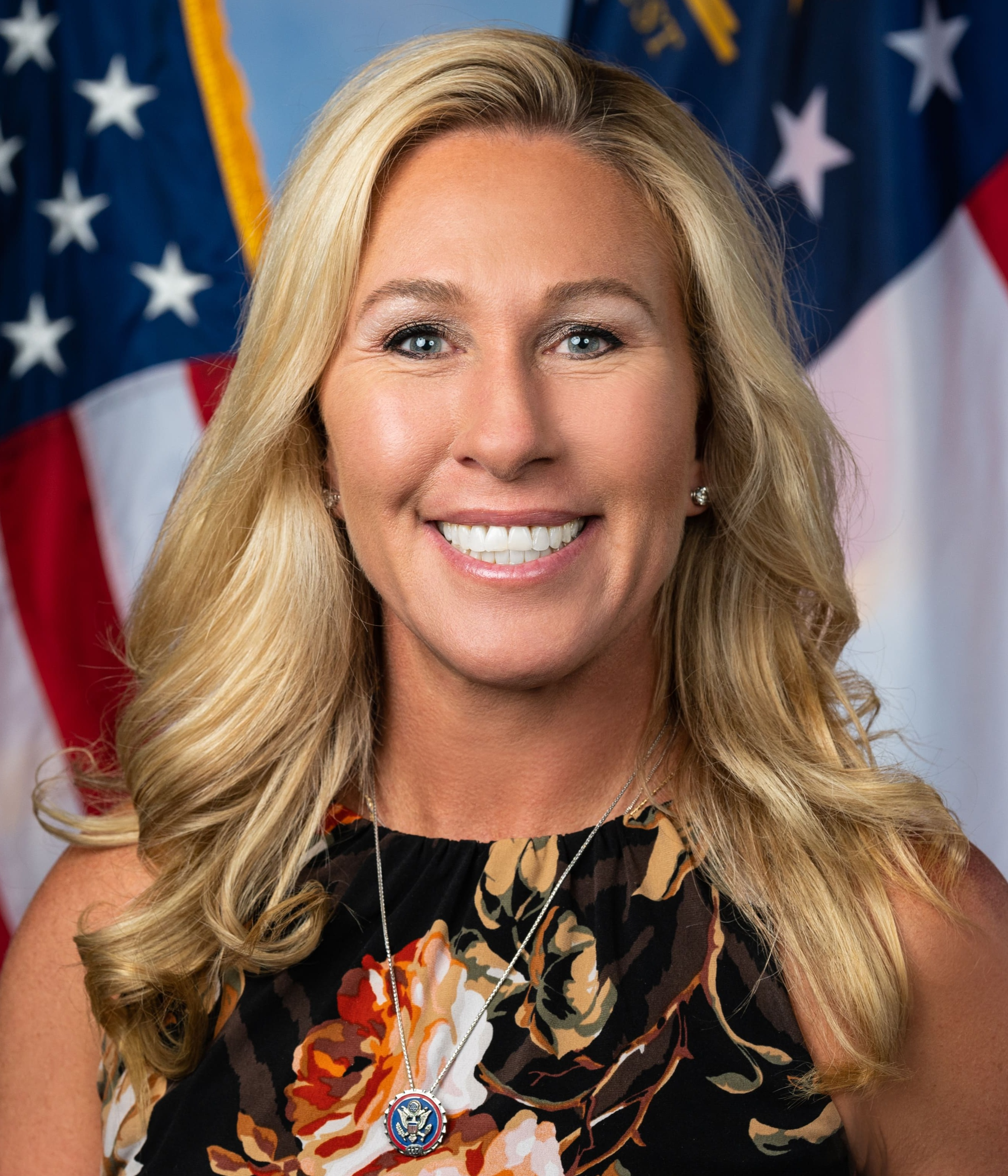

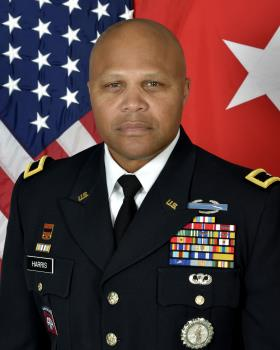
Nominee	Marjorie Taylor Greene	Shawn Harris
Party	Republican	Democratic
Popular vote	243,446	134,759
Percentage	64.4%	35.6%
- Greene: 50–60% 60–70% 70–80% 80–90% Harris: 50–60% 60–70% 70–80%
U.S. Representative before election
Marjorie Taylor Greene
Republican
Elected U.S. Representative
Marjorie Taylor Greene
Republican

The 14th district is based in the northwest corner of the state. The incumbent was Republican Marjorie Taylor Greene, who was re-elected with 65.9% of the vote in 2022.

Although Greene won reelection in a landslide, this was her closest margin of victory in any of her political campaigns; it decreased about 1.5 points from 2022.

=== Republican primary ===
==== Nominee ====
- Marjorie Taylor Greene, incumbent U.S. representative

==== Endorsements ====
Marjorie Taylor Greene

Organizations

- Latinos for America First

==== Fundraising ====
Campaign finance reports as of May 1, 2024
Candidate	Raised	Spent	Cash on hand
Marjorie Taylor Greene (R)	$5,347,359	$6,078,104	$1,227,448
Source: Federal Election Commission

==== Results ====
Republican primary results
Party	Candidate	Votes	%
Republican	Marjorie Taylor Greene (incumbent)	56,932	100.0
Total votes		56,932	100.0

=== Democratic primary ===
==== Nominee ====
- Shawn Harris, cattleman and retired brigadier general

==== Eliminated in runoff ====
- Clarence Blalock, GIS contractor

==== Eliminated in primary ====
- Deric Houston, telecom sales compensation manager
- Joseph Leigh, architectural manager

==== Withdrawn ====
- Bart Bryant, lineworker (ran for state senate)
- Tambrei Cash, stay-at-home mom and former flooring contractor (switched to the 9th district)

==== Endorsements ====
Shawn Harris

Organizations

- VoteVets

==== Fundraising ====
Campaign finance reports as of May 1, 2024
Candidate	Raised	Spent	Cash on hand
Clarence Blalock (D)	$12,184 (Note: $7,380 of this total was self-funded by Blalock.)	$9,878	$2,506
Shawn Harris (D)	$364,474	$297,276	$58,591
Deric Houston (D)	$7,002	$7,385	$0
Joseph Leigh (D)	$17,334 (Note: $7,000 of this total was self-funded by Leigh.)	$13,995	$3,338
Source: Federal Election Commission

==== Results ====
Democratic primary results
Party	Candidate	Votes	%
Democratic	Clarence Blalock	7,005	38.7
Democratic	Shawn Harris	6,881	38.1
Democratic	Deric Houston	2,630	14.5
Democratic	Joseph Leigh	1,566	8.7
Total votes		18,082	100.0

==== Runoff ====
===== Fundraising =====
Campaign finance reports as of May 29, 2024
Candidate	Raised	Spent	Cash on hand
Clarence Blalock (D)	$19,808 (Note: $12,380 of this total was self-funded by Blalock.)	$16,569	$3,438
Shawn Harris (D)	$436,672	$323,021	$102,592
Source: Federal Election Commission

===== Results =====
Democratic primary results
Party	Candidate	Votes	%
Democratic	Shawn Harris	7,219	69.0
Democratic	Clarence Blalock	3,245	31.0
Total votes		10,464	100.0

=== General election ===
==== Predictions ====
Source	Ranking	As of
The Cook Political Report	Solid R	October 31, 2023
Inside Elections	Solid R	March 10, 2023
Sabato's Crystal Ball	Safe R	February 23, 2023
Elections Daily	Safe R	June 8, 2023
CNalysis	Solid R	November 16, 2023
Decision Desk HQ	Solid R	June 1, 2024

==== Results ====
Georgia's 14th congressional district, 2024
Party	Candidate	Votes	%
Republican	Marjorie Taylor Greene (incumbent)	243,446	64.4
Democratic	Shawn Harris	134,759	35.6
Total votes		378,205	100.0
Republican hold			
