= Brian Jack =

American politician (born 1988)

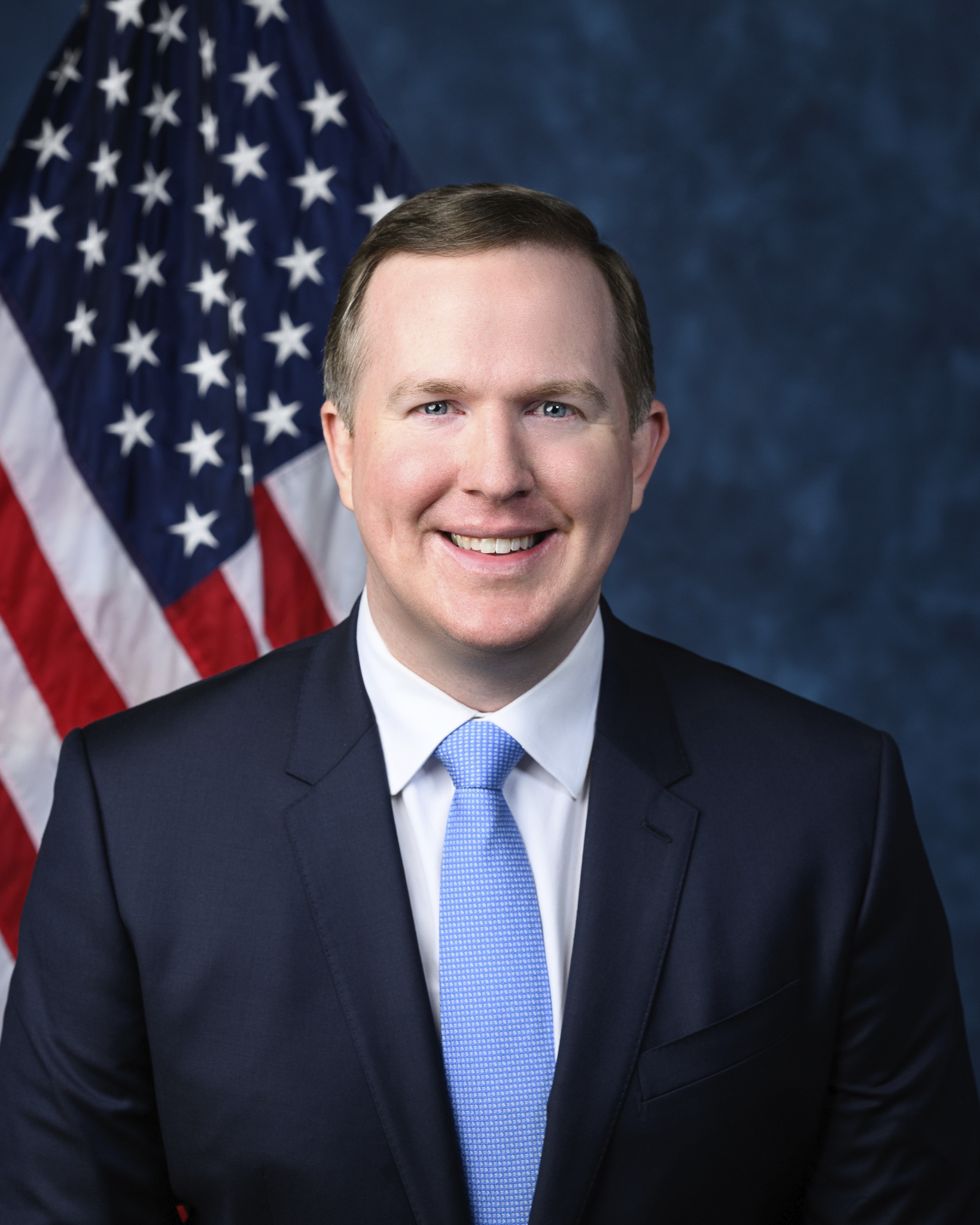
- Official portrait, 2024

Chair-elect of the National Republican Congressional Committee
- Assuming office January 3, 2027
- Leader: Jim Jordan (elect)
- Succeeding: Richard Hudson

Member of the U.S. House of Representatives from Georgia's 3rd district
- Incumbent
- Assumed office January 3, 2025
- Preceded by: Drew Ferguson

White House Political Director
- In office February 2, 2019 – January 20, 2021
- President: Donald Trump
- Preceded by: Bill Stepien
- Succeeded by: Emmy Ruiz (Political Strategy and Outreach)

Personal details
- Born: Brian Timothy Jack; February 17, 1988 (age 38) Atlanta, Georgia, U.S.
- Party: Republican
- Education: Pepperdine University (BA)
- Website: House website Campaign website

Brian Timothy Jack (born February 17, 1988) is an American politician and political advisor serving as the U.S. representative from Georgia's 3rd congressional district since 2025.

Born and raised in Georgia, Jack graduated from Pepperdine University in 2010. After working for the Republican National Committee and AIPAC, Jack joined the 2016 presidential campaign of Donald Trump. From 2019 to 2021, Jack served as White House Political Director in the first Trump administration. He later worked as a senior advisor on President Trump's 2024 campaign before his election to Congress.

== Education ==
Born in Atlanta on February 17, 1988, Jack graduated from Woodward Academy in College Park, Georgia in 2006. In 2010, Jack graduated from Pepperdine University in Malibu, California.

== Early political career ==
Jack worked at the Republican National Committee (RNC) and the American Israel Public Affairs Committee (AIPAC), a pro-Israel nonprofit organization. At AIPAC, Jack was a political analyst who liaised with candidates for Congress.

=== 2016 presidential election ===
Jack left AIPAC to work for Ben Carson's 2016 presidential campaign, where he managed the nationwide volunteer effort to qualify Carson for Republican presidential primary ballots. Later, Jack also coordinated Carson’s campaign in the Southeastern states.

On March 11, 2016, Jack joined Donald Trump’s 2016 presidential campaign as its national delegate director. Jack represented Trump’s campaign at Republican political conventions in North Dakota, Michigan, Maine, Arizona, North Carolina, Montana, New Mexico and Georgia, and worked to secure delegate endorsements for Trump.

At the 2016 Republican National Convention, Jack led the efforts to combat the Never Trump movement. Following the Convention, Jack coordinated Trump’s campaign in Georgia and Florida. After Trump’s election, Jack worked in the presidential transition, recommending personnel appointments for the incoming Administration.

=== The White House ===
On January 20, 2017, Jack was appointed Special Assistant to the President and Deputy White House Political Director by President Trump. Following the 2018 midterm elections, Jack was appointed White House Political Director on February 2, 2019.

On September 13, 2020, Jack was promoted to Assistant to the President, the highest rank of Executive Office of the President staff. Shortly after Election Day 2020, Jack contracted COVID-19 amid the White House COVID-19 outbreak.

=== 2024 presidential election ===
Upon the announcement of Donald Trump’s 2024 presidential campaign, Jack joined the campaign as one of its three key advisors. As President Trump’s liaison to Congress, Jack managed the effort to secure endorsements from elected officials and Republican Party leaders during the 2024 Republican Party presidential primaries.

== U.S. House of Representatives ==
=== 2024 election ===
On December 14, 2023, incumbent U.S. Representative Drew Ferguson announced he would not seek re-election to represent Georgia’s 3rd Congressional District.

With President Trump’s endorsement, Brian Jack qualified as a candidate for Congress on March 7, 2024, and spoke alongside Trump at a rally in northwest Georgia two days later, on March 9.

Within the first three weeks of his campaign, Jack raised over $600,000, leading each of his four opponents and establishing himself as the race’s early frontrunner.

Throughout the campaign, Jack earned endorsements from and hosted campaign events with prominent conservative leaders, including Jim Jordan, Kari Lake, Lieutenant Governor of Georgia Burt Jones, Agriculture Commissioner of Georgia Tyler Harper, and Donald Trump Jr.. He also received endorsements from U.S. Representatives Marjorie Taylor Greene and Mike Collins whose father, Mac, previously represented a majority of Georgia’s 3rd Congressional District, and former Speaker of the U.S. House of Representatives Newt Gingrich, who likewise previously represented a majority of the current district. Additionally, the Club for Growth and College Republicans for America endorsed Jack, and mobilized their networks to support him.

On May 21, Jack earned 46.7% of the primary election vote, advancing to a runoff election with former State Senate Majority Leader Mike Dugan, who received 24.9% of the vote.

During the runoff election, Jack received endorsements from former State Senator Mike Crane and former State Representative Philip Singleton, who finished 3rd and 4th in the May 21 primary, respectively.

On June 18, Jack won the Republican nomination, defeating Dugan, with 62.6% of the vote.

Jack faced Democratic nominee Maura Keller in the general election, defeating her with 66.3% of the vote, to win election to the 119th United States Congress.

=== Committee assignments ===
For the 119th Congress, Jack serves on the following committees:

- Committee on Oversight and Government Reform
  - Subcommittee on Delivering on Government Efficiency
  - Subcommittee on Federal Law Enforcement
  - Subcommittee on Government Operations
- Committee on Rules
  - Subcommittee on the Rules and Organization of the House
- Committee on Small Business
  - Chair, Subcommittee on Innovation, Entrepreneurship, and Workforce Development
  - Subcommittee on Contracting and Infrastructure
- Republican Steering Committee

His 33-member freshman class elected Jack to the Republican Steering Committee, the powerful panel that distributes committee assignments, on November 15, 2024.

=== Caucus memberships ===
For the 119th Congress, Jack joined the following caucuses:

- Co-Chair, House Republican Israel Caucus
- Congressional Biofuels Caucus
- Republican Study Committee

== Electoral history ==
2024 Georgia’s 3rd Congressional District general election, November 5
Party	Candidate	Votes	%
Republican	Brian Jack	273,036	66.31
Democratic	Maura Keller	138,749	33.69
Total votes		411,785	100.00

2024 Georgia’s 3rd Congressional District primary runoff election, June 18
Party	Candidate	Votes	%
Republican	Brian Jack	29,654	62.63
Republican	Mike Dugan	17,693	37.37
Total votes		47,347	100.00

2024 Georgia’s 3rd Congressional District primary election, May 21
Party	Candidate	Votes	%
Republican	Brian Jack	32,877	46.70
Republican	Mike Dugan	17,522	24.89
Republican	Mike Crane	11,182	15.88
Republican	Philip Singleton	4,743	6.74
Republican	Jim Bennett	4,076	5.79
Total votes		70,400	100.00

== Personal life ==
Jack is a member of the Anglican Church in North America, a Christian denomination with an episcopal polity.

He is a sixth-generation Georgian and a member of the Sons of the American Revolution.

Jack was named to Red Alert Politics’ 30 Under 30 list in 2016.

== See also ==
- List of current United States representatives
- List of new members of the 119th United States Congress
- Executive Office appointments of the first Trump administration

Political offices
Preceded by Bill Stepien	White House Political Director; 2019–2021	Succeeded by Emmy Ruiz as White House Director of Political Strategy and Outreach
U.S. House of Representatives
Preceded by Drew Ferguson	Member of the U.S. House of Representatives from Georgia's 3rd congressional district 2025–present	Incumbent
U.S. order of precedence (ceremonial)
Preceded by Jeff Hurd	United States representatives by seniority 391st	Succeeded by Julie Johnson
