= Georgia's 65th House of Representatives district =

State district in Georgia, USA

Georgia's 65th State House of Representatives district
Representative
Robert Dawson; D–Atlanta
- Demographics: 20.9% White; 71.1% Black; 6.8% Hispanic; 0.5% Asian
- Population: 55,580

District 65 elects one member of the Georgia House of Representatives. It contains parts of Coweta County and Fulton County.

== Members ==
- Sharon Beasley-Teague (2005–2021)
- Mandisha Thomas (2021–2025)
- Robert Dawson (since 2025)
