= Mike Dugan (Georgia politician) =

American politician (born 1963)

Majority Leader of the Georgia Senate
- In office January 14, 2019 – January 9, 2023
- Preceded by: Bill Cowsert
- Succeeded by: Steve Gooch

Member of the Georgia Senate from the 30th district
- In office January 14, 2013 – January 3, 2024
- Preceded by: Bill Hamrick
- Succeeded by: Tim Bearden

Personal details
- Born: Michael Brian Dugan; August 19, 1963 (age 63) Carrollton, Georgia, U.S.
- Party: Republican
- Education: University of West Georgia (BA, MA)

Michael Brian Dugan (born August 19, 1963) is an American politician who served in the Georgia State Senate representing the 30th District from 2013 to 2024. He was the Republican Majority Leader from 2019 to 2023.

In 2024, Dugan was a candidate in Georgia's 3rd congressional district. He announced his candidacy on January 3, 2024. he was defeated in the Republican primary by former White House Political Director Brian Jack.

Georgia State Senate
Preceded by Bill Cowsert	Majority Leader of the Georgia Senate; January 14, 2019 – January 9, 2023	Succeeded by Steve Gooch
