= Georgia's 51st Senate district =

State district in Georgia, USA

Georgia's 51st State Senate district
Senator
Steve Gooch; R–Dahlonega
- Demographics: 91.9% White; 1.2% Black; 4.7% Hispanic; 0.5% Asian
- Population: 178,187

District 51 of the Georgia Senate elects one member of the Georgia State Senate. It contains the entirety of Dawson, Fannin, Gilmer, Lumpkin, Pickens, White and Union counties and a part of White County.

== State senators ==
- Bill Stephens (until 2005)
- Chip Pearson (2005–2011)
- Steve Gooch (since 2011)
