= Chip Pearson (politician) =

American politician

Member of the Georgia State Senate from the 51st district
- In office January 10, 2005 – January 10, 2011
- Preceded by: Bill Stephens
- Succeeded by: Steve Gooch

Personal details
- Born: November 28, 1960 (age 65)
- Party: Republican

Chip Pearson (born November 28, 1960) is an American politician who served in the Georgia State Senate from the 51st district from 2005 to 2011.
