= Robert Dawson (Georgia politician) =

American politician

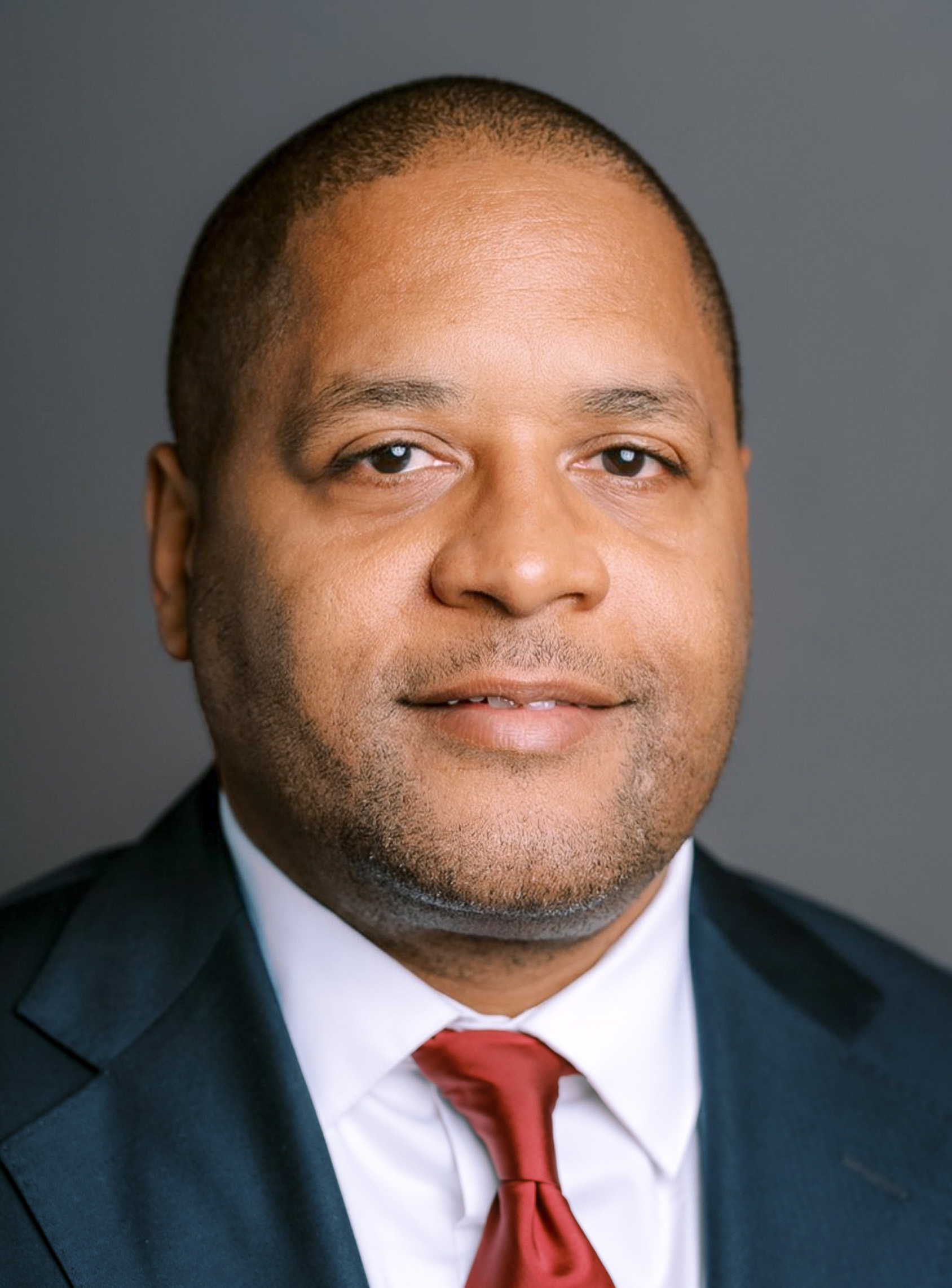

Member of the Georgia House of Representatives from the 65th district
- Incumbent
- Assumed office January 13, 2025
- Preceded by: Mandisha Thomas

Personal details
- Party: Democratic
- Education: Sarah Lawrence College (BA); Bennington College (MFA); Harvard University (MA)

Robert Dawson is an American politician. He was elected on November 5, 2024, as a member at the 2024 Georgia House of Representatives election representing Georgia House of Representatives District 65 for the Democratic Party. He took office on January 13, 2025.

== Early life and education ==
Robert grew up in Birmingham, Alabama and earned degrees from Sarah Lawrence College, Bennington College, and Harvard University.
