= Mandisha Thomas =

American politician from Georgia

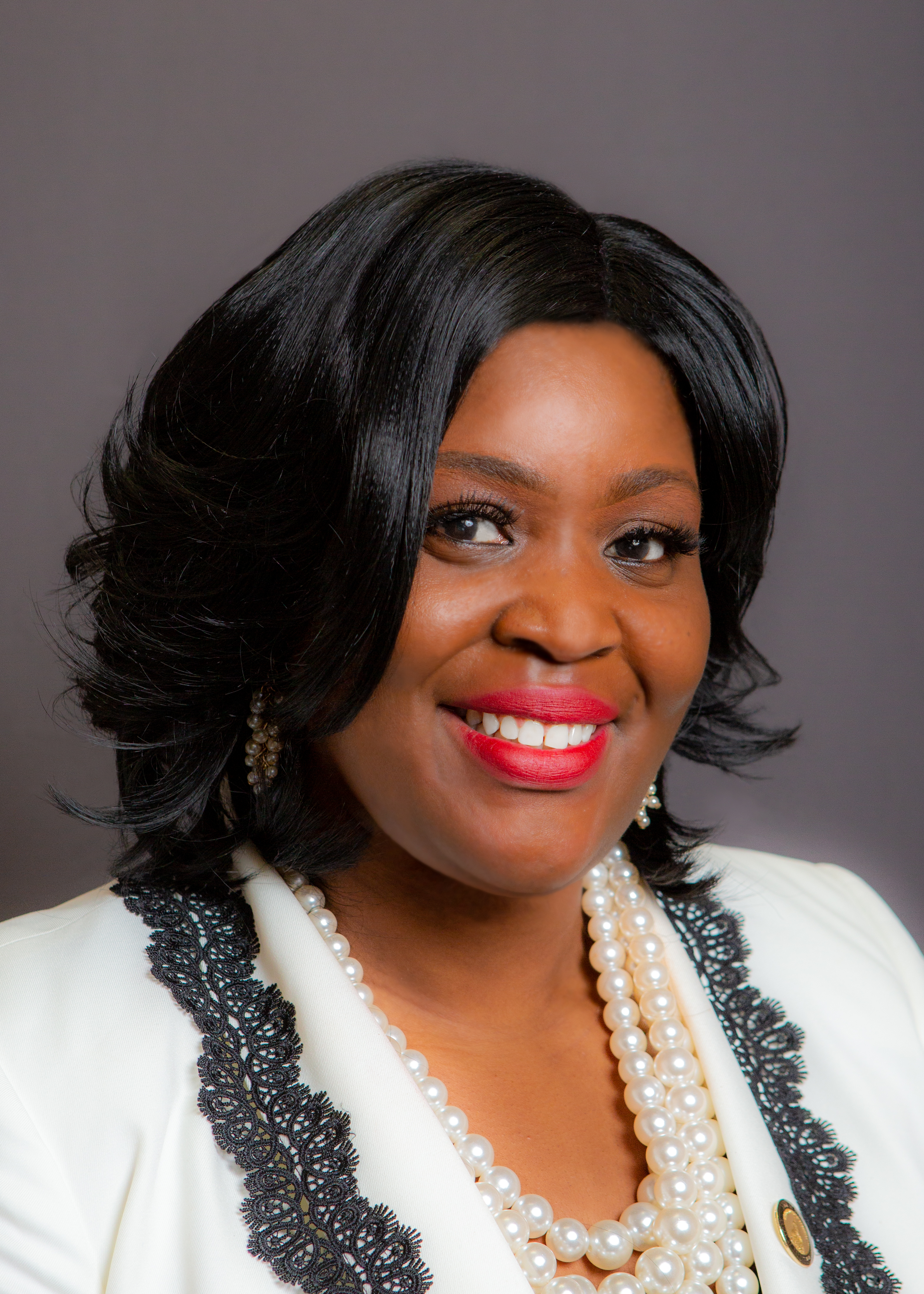

Member of the Georgia House of Representatives from the 65th district
- In office January 11, 2021 – January 13, 2025
- Preceded by: Sharon Beasley-Teague
- Succeeded by: Robert Dawson

Personal details
- Born: February 11, 1975 (age 51)
- Party: Democratic
- Website: www.mandishathomas.com

Mandisha Ann-Marie Thomas (born February 11, 1975) is an American politician from Georgia. Thomas was a Democratic member of the Georgia House of Representatives for District 65.

== Early life ==
Thomas was born in Berkeley, California.

== Career ==
Thomas did not seek re-election at the 2024 Georgia House of Representatives election, to challenge Lucy McBath in the Democratic primary for Georgia's 6th congressional district in the 2024 election but was unsuccessful.
