= Sharon Beasley-Teague =

American politician from Georgia

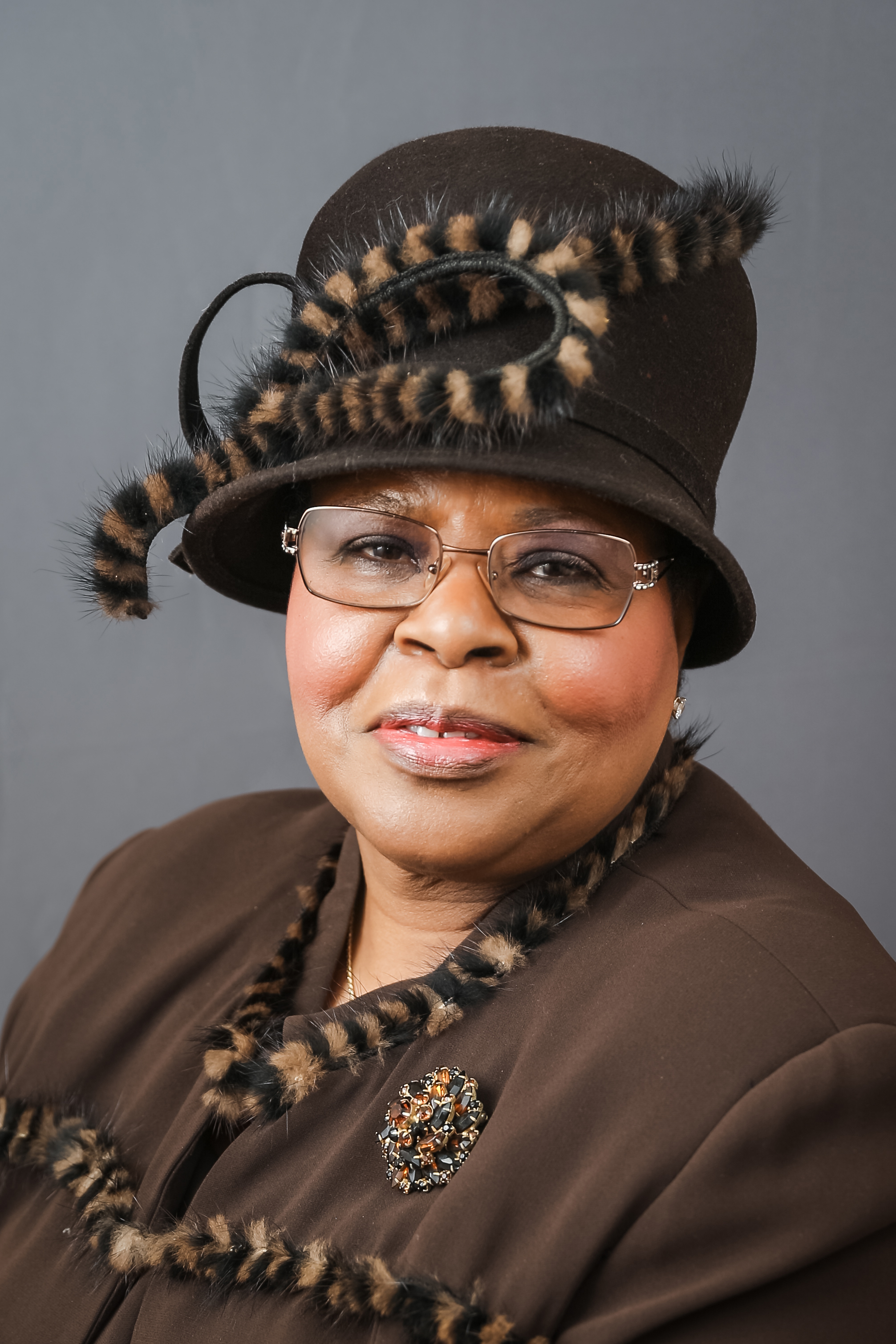

Member of the Georgia House of Representatives
- In office January 11, 1993 – January 11, 2021
- Succeeded by: Mandisha Thomas
- Constituency: 58th district (1993–2003); 48th district (Note: From Post 2) (2003–2005); 65th district (2005–2021)

Personal details
- Born: February 15, 1952 (age 74)
- Party: Democratic
- Spouse: Farajo Elnamala
- Education: Indiana College of Business Technology; Georgia State University
- Profession: Machinist

Sharon Beasley-Teague (born February 15, 1952) is an American politician from Georgia. She is a member of the Democratic Party and a member of the Georgia House of Representatives representing the state's 65th district. In 2020, she was defeated in the runoff election by Mandisha Thomas.

== Education ==
Beasley-Teague graduated from Indiana College of Business Technology and attended Georgia State University.

== Committee assignments ==
Beasley-Teague currently serves on the following committees:

- Game, Fish, and Parks
- Human Relations and Aging
- Legislative and Congressional Reapportionment
- Ways and Means

== Elections ==
48th district (Post2) 2002 Primary Election
Party	Candidate	Votes	%
Democratic	Sharon Beasley-Teague	10,853	100%
Total votes		10,853	100%

48th district (Post2) 2002 General Election
Party	Candidate	Votes	%
Democratic	Sharon Beasley-Teague	32,901	100%
Total votes		32,901	100%

65th district 2004 Primary Election
Party	Candidate	Votes	%
Democratic	Sharon Beasley-Teague	3,359	75.6%
Democratic	T.J. COPELAND	1,083	24.4%
Total votes		4,442	100%

65th district 2004 Georgia General Election
Party	Candidate	Votes	%
Democratic	Sharon Beasley-Teague	13,722	100%
Total votes		13,722	100%

2006 Primary election
Party	Candidate	Votes	%
Democratic	Sharon Beasley-Teague	2,432	60.8%
Democratic	T.J. Copeland	1,568	39.2%
Total votes		4,000	100%

2006 General Election
Party	Candidate	Votes	%
Democratic	Sharon Beasley-Teague	9,997	100%
Total votes		9,997	100%

2008 Primary Election
Party	Candidate	Votes	%
Democratic	Sharon Beasley-Teague	2,225	54.6%
Democratic	Lewanna Heard	737	18.1%
Democratic	Sandra B. Hardy	681	16.7%
Democratic	Woody Holmes	247	6.1%
Democratic	Charles Sharper	186	4.6%
Total votes		4,076	100%

2008 General Election
Party	Candidate	Votes	%
Democratic	Sharon Beasley-Teague	25,793	100%
Total votes		25,793	100%

2010 Primary Election
Party	Candidate	Votes	%
Democratic	Sharon Beasley-Teague	3,551	76.1%
Democratic	George Sneed	1,118	23.9%
Total votes		4,669	100%

2010 General Election
Party	Candidate	Votes	%
Democratic	Sharon Beasley-Teague	17,656	100%
Total votes		17,656	100%

2012 Primary Election
Party	Candidate	Votes	%
Democratic	Sharon Beasley-Teague	3,813	100%
Total votes		100%	3,813

2012 General Election
Party	Candidate	Votes	%
Democratic	Sharon Beasley-Teague	18,793	100%
Total votes		18,793	100%

2014 Primary Election
Party	Candidate	Votes	%
Democratic	Sharon Beasley-Teague	2,871	100%
Total votes		2,871	100%

2014 General Election
Party	Candidate	Votes	%
Democratic	Sharon Beasley-Teague	12,579	100%

2016 Primary Election
Party	Candidate	Votes	%
Democratic	Sharon Beasley-Teague	2,327	73.62%
Democratic	Sylvia Wayfer	834	26.38%
Total votes		3,161	100%

2016 General Election
Party	Candidate	Votes	%
Democratic	Sharon Beasley-Teague	19,109	82.02%
Republican	Gordon Rolle	4,190	17.98%
Total votes		23,299	100%

2018 Primary Election
Party	Candidate	Votes	%
Democratic	Sharon Beasley-Teague	2,907	55.97%
Democratic	Mandisha Thomas	2,287	44.03%
Total votes		5,194	100%

2018 General Election
Party	Candidate	Votes	%
Democratic	Sharon Beasley-Teague	21,189	100%
Total votes		21,189	100%

2020 Primary Election
Party	Candidate	Votes	%
Democratic	Sharon Beasley-Teague	6,141	49.20%
Democratic	Mandisha Thomas	4,562	36.55%
Democratic	Amber Doss-Hunter	1,779	14.25%
Total votes		12,482%	100%

2020 General Runoff
Party	Candidate	Votes	%
Democratic	Mandisha Thomas	3,427	58.03%
Democratic	Sharon Beasley-Teague	2,479	41.97%
Total votes		5,906	100%
