= Steve Gooch =

American politician

- Gooch, 2023

Majority Leader of the Georgia State Senate
- In office January 9, 2023 – May 15, 2025
- Preceded by: Mike Dugan
- Succeeded by: Jason Anavitarte

Member of the Georgia State Senate from the 51st district
- Incumbent
- Assumed office January 10, 2011
- Preceded by: Chip Pearson

Personal details
- Born: Stephen Wade Gooch; February 25, 1967 (age 59) Dahlonega, Georgia, U.S.
- Party: Republican
- Spouse: Shannon Lourie Gooch
- Children: 3
- Education: University of North Georgia (BS, MPA)

Stephen Wade Gooch (born February 25, 1967) is an American politician. He is a member and former majority leader of the Georgia State Senate from the 51st District, serving as a senator since 2010 and as the majority leader from 2023 to 2025. He is a member of the Republican Party.

In 2014, the Georgia Senate elected Gooch as the majority whip, and was re-elected in 2016 and 2018. He was elected to serve as the majority leader in 2022. Gooch was succeeded by Republican Senator Jason Anavitarte on June 17, 2025.

On May 15, 2025, Gooch announced his candidacy for Georgia lieutenant governor in the 2026 election. He pledged he would model his candidacy after U.S. President Donald Trump.

On May 19, 2026, Gooch lost the Republican primary for lieutenant governor, with 11% of the vote. His term as a senator will end on January 11, 2027.

== Policy and legislation ==
In January 2024, Gooch co-sponsored S.B. 390, which would withhold government funding for any Georgia libraries affiliated with the American Library Association. The bill was drafted following the election of ALA President Emily Drabinski and allegations of the organization promoting a personal ideology and influencing librarian certification.

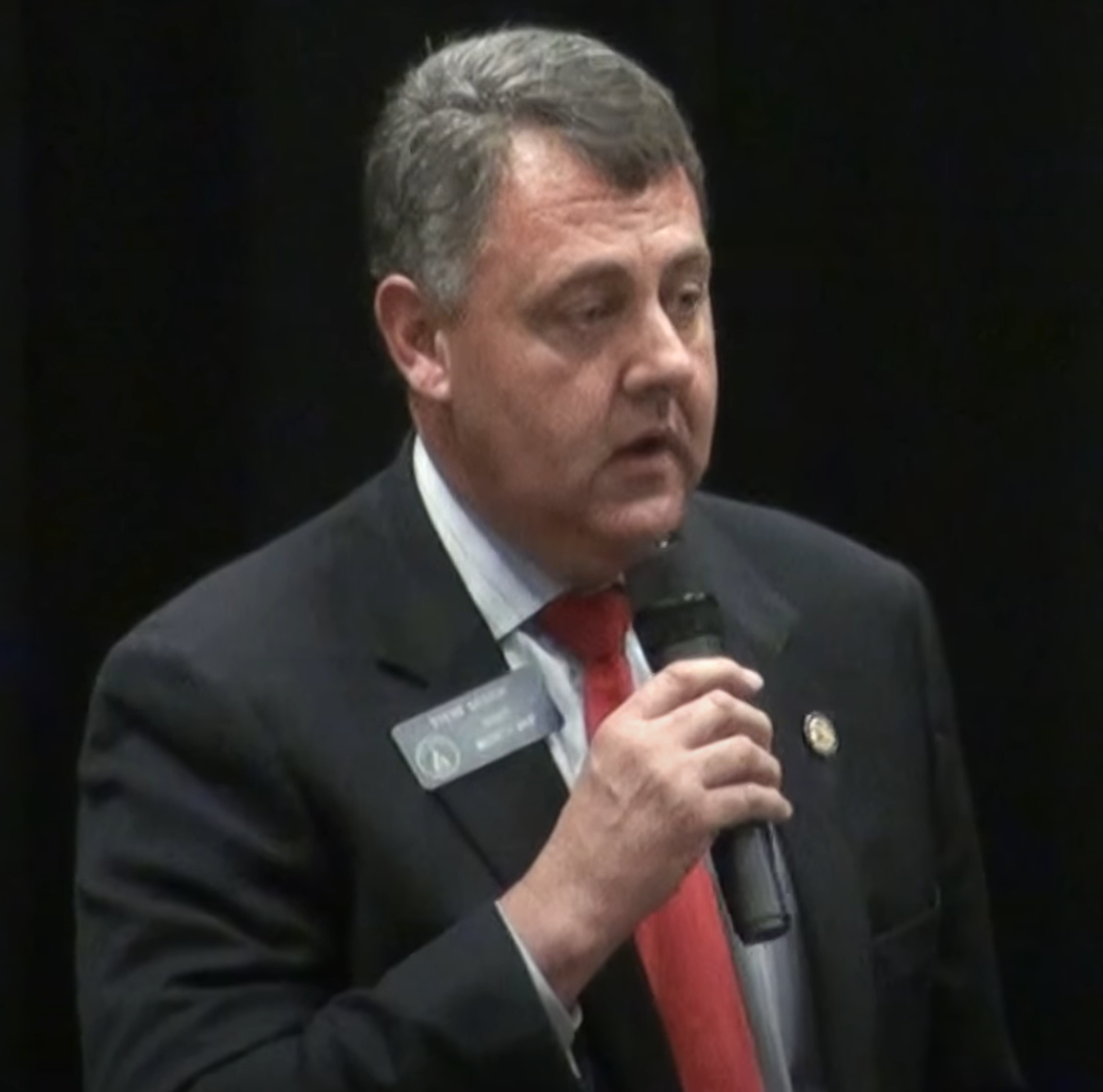
Gooch debating in 2016

Georgia State Senate
Preceded by Mike Dugan	Majority Leader of the Georgia Senate; 2023–2025	Succeeded by Jason Anavitarte
