= Red Alert Politics =

US news and opinion website

- Website type: Conservative news and opinion, politics
- Available in: English
- Owner: The Anschutz Corporation through MediaDC
- Editor: Ron Meyer
- Website: redalertpolitics.com
- Advertising: Native
- Commercial: Yes
- Registration: Optional
- Launched: 2012
- Current status: Active

Red Alert Politics was an American conservative news and opinion website based in Washington, D.C. It was owned by MediaDC, a subsidiary of Clarity Media Group, which is owned by the Anschutz Corporation.

The site focuses on targeting younger and millennial readers, producing an annual "30 under 30" list of influential conservatives under 30.

On November 1, 2017, the site was merged to become a section of The Washington Examiner focusing on campus and millennial coverage.
