= Drew Ferguson (politician) =

American dentist & politician (born 1966)

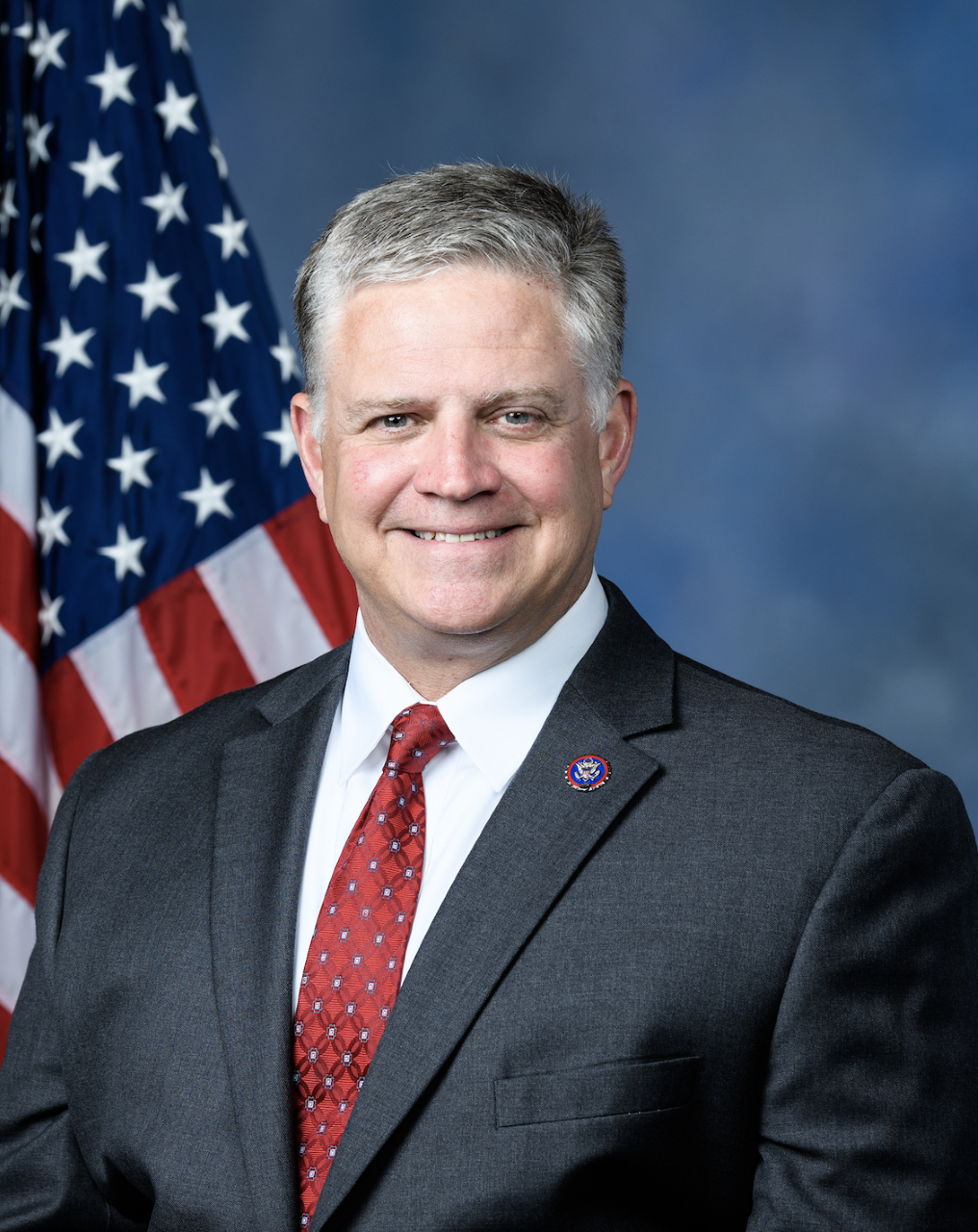
- Official portrait, 2021

House Republican Chief Deputy Whip
- In office January 3, 2019 – January 3, 2023
- Leader: Kevin McCarthy
- Preceded by: Patrick McHenry
- Succeeded by: Guy Reschenthaler

Member of the U.S. House of Representatives from Georgia's 3rd district
- In office January 3, 2017 – January 3, 2025
- Preceded by: Lynn Westmoreland
- Succeeded by: Brian Jack

Personal details
- Born: Anderson Drew Ferguson IV; November 15, 1966 (age 59) Langdale, Alabama, U.S.
- Party: Republican
- Spouse: Julie Ferguson
- Children: 6
- Education: University of Georgia (BS); Augusta University (DMD)
- Ferguson's voice Ferguson honoring Mike Yeager, incoming U.S. Marshal for the Northern District of Georgia. Recorded February 25, 2019

Anderson Drew Ferguson IV (born November 15, 1966) is an American dentist and politician who served as the U.S. representative for Georgia's 3rd congressional district from 2017 to 2025. The district stretches from the southern suburbs of Atlanta to the northern suburbs of Columbus, including a sliver of Columbus itself.

A member of the Republican Party, Ferguson previously served as the mayor of West Point, Georgia, a city between LaGrange and Columbus.

== Early life and education ==
Ferguson was born in Langdale, Alabama, in 1966 and graduated from the University of Georgia and the Medical College of Georgia.

== Career prior to Congress ==
Ferguson was a dentist with a family dental practice. He served as an alderman for West Point, Georgia, and then as mayor from 2008 to 2016. He resigned in 2016 to focus on his race for the House of Representatives.

== U.S. House of Representatives ==
=== Elections ===
==== 2016 ====
In 2016, Ferguson ran for the Georgia third district seat being vacated by Republican incumbent Lynn Westmoreland. He placed in the top two in the May Republican primary and faced State Senator Mike Crane in the runoff. The two had finished within 100 votes of each other; both had about 27% of the vote.

In the runoff, Ferguson had the support of business-oriented Republicans, including Westmoreland. The primary and its runoff were expensive and bitterly contested; Super PACs and other groups outside Georgia spent more than $2 million on the race.

On July 26, Ferguson defeated Crane with 54% of the vote. In the November general election, Ferguson defeated Democratic nominee Angela Pendley with 68% of the vote.

==== 2018 ====
In the May 2018 Republican primary, Ferguson faced Philip Singleton of Sharpsburg, a former Army helicopter pilot; Ferguson won with 74% of the vote.

In November, Ferguson defeated Democratic nominee Chuck Enderlin with 66% of the vote.

=== 2024 ===
He was not a candidate for reelection to the 119th Congress.

=== Tenure ===
Ferguson was sworn into office on January 3, 2017.

In November 2018, after he won reelection, Ferguson was appointed chief deputy whip for the House Republican Conference by House Majority Whip Steve Scalise. This post is historically a stepping stone to higher posts. For example, House Majority Leader Eric Cantor and House Speakers Dennis Hastert and Kevin McCarthy once served as chief deputy whip.

On May 19, 2021, Ferguson and the other seven Republican House leaders in the 117th Congress voted against establishing a national commission to investigate the 2021 United States Capitol attack. Thirty-five House Republicans and all 217 Democrats present voted to establish the commission.

=== Committee assignments ===
For the 118th Congress:

- Committee on the Budget
- Committee on Ways and Means
  - Subcommittee on Social Security (Chairman)
  - Subcommittee on Tax
- Joint Economic Committee

=== Caucus memberships ===
- Congressional Taiwan Caucus
- U.S.-Japan Caucus
- Republican Study Committee

== Political positions ==
Running for election in 2016, Ferguson's main issues were securing the borders, destroying the Islamic State, strengthening the military, replacing the income tax with a flat tax, repealing Obamacare, and supporting a constitutional amendment for congressional term limits. He signed on to the lawsuit seeking to overturn the result of the 2020 election, one of four Georgian representatives to do so. The Supreme Court dismissed the suit on December 11, 2020.

=== Texas v. Pennsylvania ===
In December 2020, Ferguson was one of 126 Republican members of the House of Representatives to sign an amicus brief in support of Texas v. Pennsylvania, a lawsuit filed at the United States Supreme Court contesting the results of the 2020 presidential election, in which Joe Biden defeated incumbent Donald Trump. The Supreme Court declined to hear the case on the basis that Texas lacked standing under Article III of the Constitution to challenge the results of an election held by another state.

=== Abortion ===
Ferguson had sponsored legislation prohibiting abortion, including H.R. 20 No Taxpayer Funding for Abortion and Abortion Insurance Full Disclosure Act, H.R. 962 Born-Alive Abortion Survivors Protection Act, H.R. 784 Pain-Capable Unborn Child Protection Act, H.R. 305 Sanctity of Human Life Act, and H.R. 369 Defund Planned Parenthood Act of 2019.

=== LGBT rights ===
In 2021, Ferguson voted against H.R. 5, the Equality Act, which would prohibit discrimination on the basis of sex, sexual orientation and gender identity.

In response to a 2016 American Family Association survey, Ferguson indicated on a Likert scale question that he agrees with the statement "Governments should define marriage as between one man and one woman; no other definition of marriage should be legalized or supported with public funds."

=== Israel ===
Ferguson voted to provide Israel with support following 2023 Hamas attack on Israel.

== Controversy ==
In February 2019, a representative from the American Federation of Government Employees sought an apology from Ferguson for a biography of Robert E. Lee that was on display in Ferguson's office. The AFGE representative reported that the book displayed a page that detailed Lee's pro-slavery beliefs. Ferguson's spokeswoman relayed an apology and said the book had been removed from display.

== Post-congressional career ==
In January 2025, Ferguson joined Alston and Bird, a prominent Atlanta-based law and lobbying firm, as a senior political adviser.

In April of 2025, Hyundai Motor Group announced that Ferguson would be the new senior vice president of government affairs in the company’s Washington, DC office.

== Electoral history ==
U.S. House, Georgia District 3 Republican Primary, 2016
Party	Candidate	Votes	%
Republican	Mike Crane	15,584	26.9
Republican	Drew Ferguson	15,491	26.8
Republican	Jim Pace	13,312	23.0
Republican	Chip Flanegan	5,728	9.9
Republican	Richard Mix	5,285	9.1
Republican	Samuel Anders	1,657	2.9
Republican	Arnall Thomas	812	1.4
Total votes		57,869	100.0

U.S. House, Georgia District 3 Republican Runoff Primary, 2016
Party	Candidate	Votes	%
Republican	Drew Ferguson	22,813	53.9
Republican	Mike Crane	19,490	46.1
Total votes		42,303	100.0

U.S. House, Georgia District 3 General Election, 2016
Party	Candidate	Votes	%
Republican	Drew Ferguson	207,218	68.3
Democratic	Angela Pendley	95,969	31.7
Total votes		303,187	100.0

U.S. House, Georgia District 3 Republican Primary, 2018
Party	Candidate	Votes	%
Republican	Drew Ferguson	43,381	74.4
Republican	Philip Singleton	14,948	25.6
Total votes		58,329	100.0

U.S. House, Georgia District 3 General Election, 2018
Party	Candidate	Votes	%
Republican	Drew Ferguson	191,996	65.5
Democratic	Chuck Enderlin	101,010	34.5
Total votes		293,006	100.0

U.S. House, Georgia District 3 General Election, 2020
Party	Candidate	Votes	%
Republican	Drew Ferguson	241,526	65.0
Democratic	Val Almonord	129,792	35.0
Total votes		371,318	100.0

U.S. House, Georgia District 3 General Election, 2022
Party	Candidate	Votes	%
Republican	Drew Ferguson	213,524	68.75
Democratic	Val Almonord	97,057	31.25
Total votes		310,581	100.0

== Personal life ==
Ferguson is married to his wife, Julie Ferguson. They have six children.

U.S. House of Representatives
Preceded by Lynn Westmoreland	Member of the U.S. House of Representatives from Georgia's 3rd congressional district 2017–2025	Succeeded by Brian Jack
Party political offices
Preceded by Patrick McHenry	House Republican Chief Deputy Whip; 2019–2023	Succeeded by Guy Reschenthaler
U.S. order of precedence (ceremonial)
Preceded by Jody Hice as Former U.S. Representative	Order of precedence of the United States as Former U.S. Representative	Succeeded by Toby Moffett as Former U.S. Representative
