= Mike Crane =

American politician (born 1963)

Member of the Georgia Senate from the 28th district
- In office January 2011 – January 2017
- Preceded by: Mitch Seabaugh
- Succeeded by: Matt Brass

Personal details
- Born: April 8, 1963 (age 63)
- Party: Republican
- Spouse: Tracey
- Children: 2
- Education: Georgia Institute of Technology (BS)

Mike Crane (born April 8, 1963) is a former Republican member of the Georgia State Senate from the 28th District. Prior to his election to the state senate, Crane was the Republican nominee for the U.S. House of Representatives in Georgia's 13th congressional district in 2010.

== Political career ==
Mike Crane challenged David Scott, the Democratic incumbent congressman from the Georgia-13th, in 2010, but lost the race. In October 2011, State Senator Mitch Seabaugh resigned from the Georgia State Senate and a special election was called, which Crane won. Crane was re-elected in 2012 and 2014.

On January 20, 2016, Crane announced his candidacy for Congress in Georgia's 3rd congressional district to replace the retiring Lynn Westmoreland. He lost the primary runoff election to Drew Ferguson.

Crane served as Chairman of the Third District Republican Party from 2017–24 and in 2024 announced his candidacy for Congress after Ferguson retired. Crane has been endorsed by Ted Cruz, Kris Kobach and Tom Tancredo.
