= Philip Singleton =

American politician (born 1981)

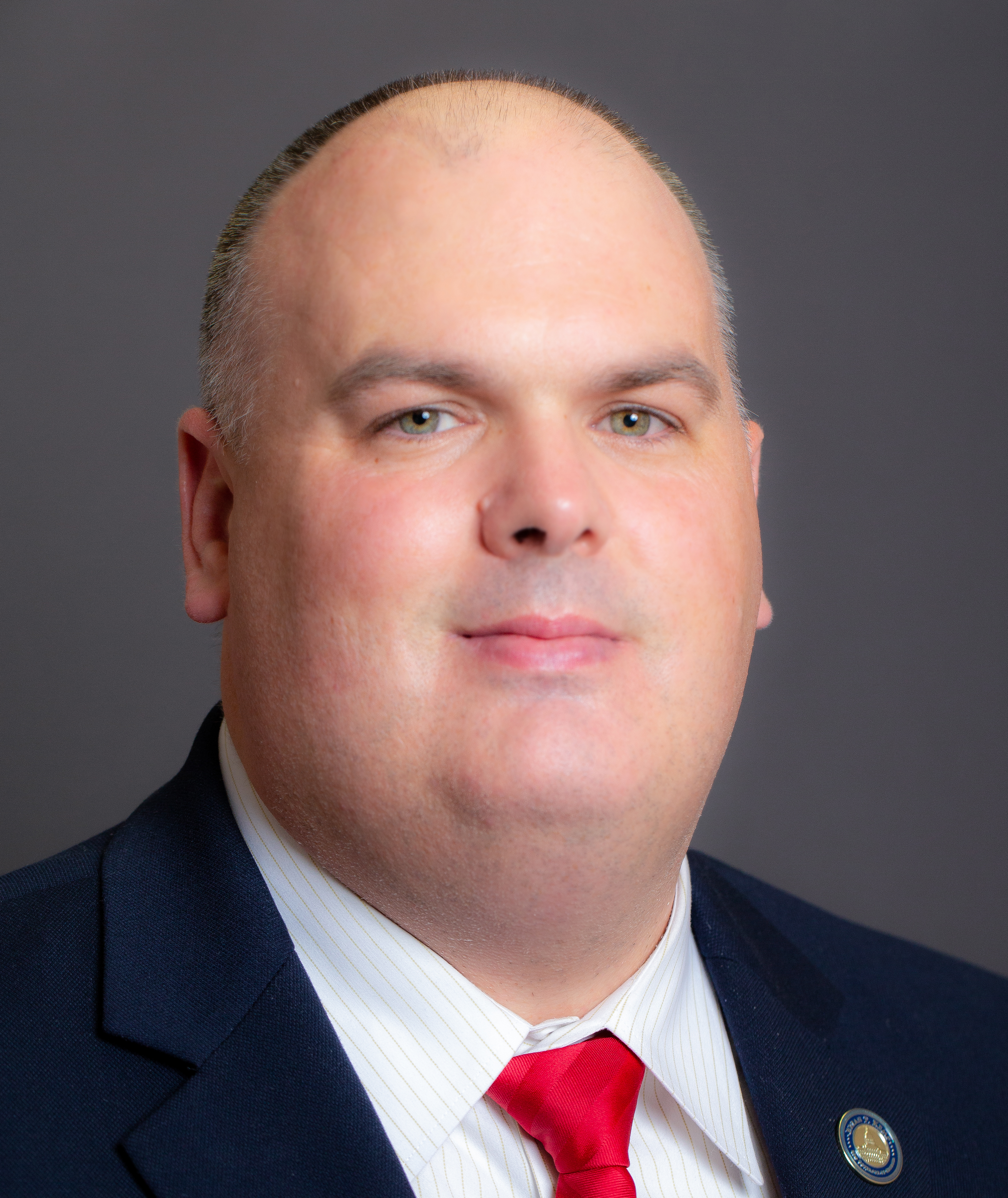

Member of the Georgia House of Representatives from the 71st district
- In office October 15, 2019 – January 9, 2023
- Preceded by: David Stover
- Succeeded by: Josh Bonner (redistricted)

Personal details
- Born: Philip Jerald Singleton; December 14, 1981 (age 44) College Park, Georgia, U.S.
- Party: Republican
- Spouse: Julie Singleton
- Education: Georgia State University (BA); Embry-Riddle Aeronautical University (MS); Webster University (MA)
- Website: Official website

Philip Jerald Singleton (born December 14, 1981) is an American politician from Georgia and a former Republican member of the Georgia House of Representatives for District 71. He is a member of the Georgia Freedom Caucus.

== Personal life ==
Singleton's wife is Julie Singleton. They have four children. Singleton and his family live in Atlanta, Georgia.

== Politics ==
Singleton's political views can be described as Alt-Right. He has authored bills on illegal immigration, constitutional carry, and in 2021 Singleton introduced Georgia House Bill 276 banning transgender women from participating in women's high school sports. He is a strong supporter of Voter ID Laws. Singleton has also used social media to claim that President of the United States Joe Biden’s administration is akin to that of former German Chancellor Adolf Hitler due to the former's use of government mandates of COVID-19 vaccines.
