= Howard Maxwell =

American politician

Member of the Georgia House of Representatives from the 17th district
- In office January 10, 2005 – January 14, 2019
- Preceded by: Bobby Franklin
- Succeeded by: Martin Momtahan

Member of the Georgia House of Representatives from the 27th district
- In office January 13, 2003 – January 10, 2005
- Preceded by: Bill Cummings
- Succeeded by: Stacey Reece

Personal details
- Born: January 23, 1949 (age 77) Douglasville, Georgia
- Party: Republican

Howard Maxwell (born January 23, 1949) is an American politician who served in the Georgia House of Representatives from 2003 to 2019.
