= 2016 United States House of Representatives elections in Georgia =

- November 8, 2016

All 14 Georgia seats to the United States House of Representatives
- Turnout: 69.28% ▲24.68 pp
	Majority party	Minority party
Party	Republican	Democratic
Last election	10	4
Seats won	10	4
Seat change	Steady	Steady
Popular vote	2,272,460	1,498,437
Percentage	60.26%	39.74%
Swing	▲1.74%	▼1.74%

Republican
50–60%
60–70%
70–80%
80–90%
90–100%
Democratic
50–60%
60–70%
70–80%
80–90%
90–100%

The 2016 United States House of Representatives elections in Georgia were held on November 8, 2016, to elect the fourteen U.S. representatives from the state of Georgia, one from each of the state's fourteen congressional districts. The elections coincided with the 2016 U.S. presidential election, as well as other elections to the House of Representatives, elections to the United States Senate, and various state and local elections. The primaries took place on May 24.

== Results summary ==
=== By district ===
Results of the general election by district:

District	Democratic		Republican		Others		Total		Result
District	Votes	%	Votes	%	Votes	%	Votes	%	Result
District 1	-	-	210,243	100.00%	-	-	210,243	100.00%	Republican hold
District 2	148,543	61.23%	94,056	38.77%	-	-	242,599	100.00%	Democratic hold
District 3	95,969	31.65%	207,218	68.35%	-	-	303,187	100.00%	Republican hold
District 4	220,146	75.72%	70,593	24.28%	-	-	290,739	100.00%	Democratic hold
District 5	253,781	84.44%	46,768	15.56%	-	-	300,549	100.00%	Democratic hold
District 6	124,917	38.32%	201,088	61.68%	-	-	326,005	100.00%	Republican hold
District 7	114,220	39.62%	174,081	60.38%	-	-	288,301	100.00%	Republican hold
District 8	83,225	32.36%	173,983	67.64%	-	-	257,208	100.00%	Republican hold
District 9	-	-	256,535	100.00%	-	-	256,535	100.00%	Republican hold
District 10	-	-	243,725	100.00%	-	-	243,725	100.00%	Republican hold
District 11	105,383	32.59%	217,935	67.41%	-	-	323,318	100.00%	Republican hold
District 12	99,420	38.40%	159,492	61.60%	-	-	258,912	100.00%	Republican hold
District 13	252,833	100.00%	-	-	-	-	252,833	100.00%	Democratic hold
District 14	-	-	216,743	100.00%	-	-	216,743	100.00%	Republican hold
Total	1,498,437	39.74%	2,272,460	60.26%	-	-	3,770,897	100.00%	

== District 1 ==
2016 Georgia's 1st congressional district election
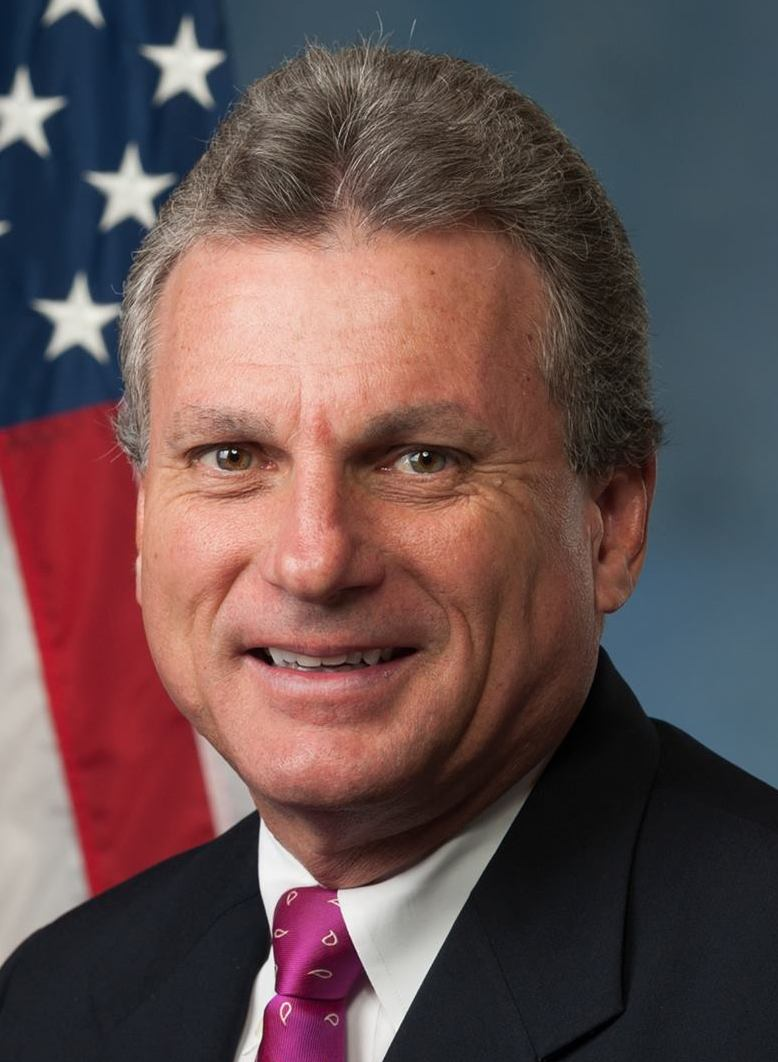
Nominee	Buddy Carter
Party	Republican
Popular vote	210,243
Percentage	99.6%
- County results Carter: >90%
U.S. Representative before election
Buddy Carter
Republican
Elected U.S. Representative
Buddy Carter
Republican

The incumbent was Republican Buddy Carter, who had represented the district since 2015. Carter was running unopposed.

=== Republican primary ===
==== Candidates ====
===== Nominee =====
- Buddy Carter, incumbent U.S. representative

==== Results ====
Republican primary results
Party	Candidate	Votes	%
Republican	Earl "Buddy" Carter (incumbent)	37,758	100.0
Total votes		37,758	100.0

=== General election ===
==== Predictions ====
Source	Ranking	As of
The Cook Political Report	Safe R	November 7, 2016
Daily Kos Elections	Safe R	November 7, 2016
Rothenberg	Safe R	November 3, 2016
Sabato's Crystal Ball	Safe R	November 7, 2016
RCP	Safe R	October 31, 2016

==== Results ====
Georgia's 1st congressional district, 2016
Party	Candidate	Votes	%
Republican	Buddy Carter (incumbent)	210,243	99.6
Democratic	Nathan Russo (write-in)	869	0.4
Total votes		211,112	100.0
Republican hold			

== District 2 ==
2016 Georgia's 2nd congressional district election
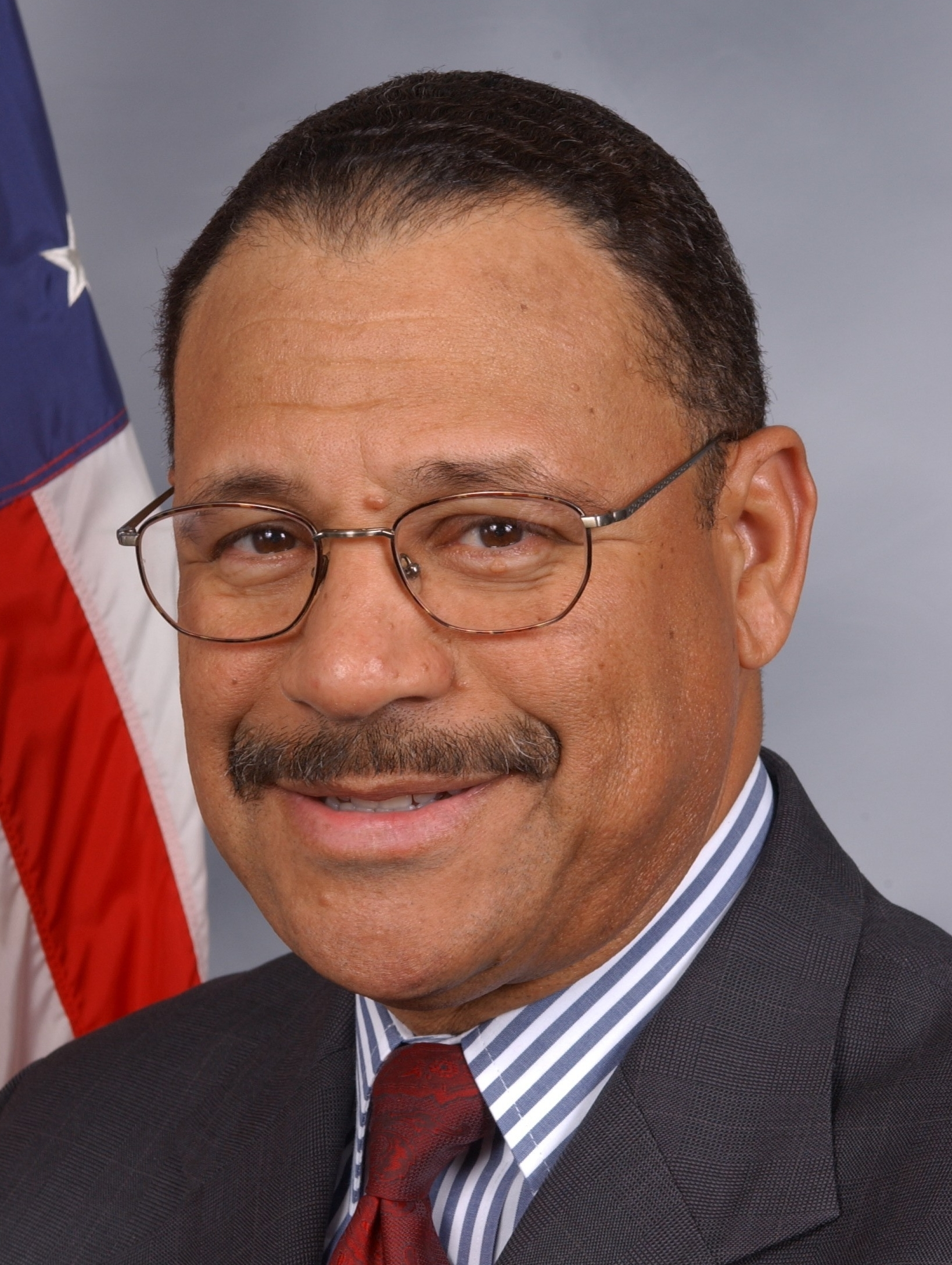

Nominee	Sanford Bishop	Greg Duke
Party	Democratic	Republican
Popular vote	148,543	94,056
Percentage	61.2%	38.8%
- County results Bishop: 50–60% 60–70% 70–80% Duke: 50–60% 60–70% 70–80%
U.S. Representative before election
Sanford Bishop
Democratic
Elected U.S. Representative
Sanford Bishop
Democratic

The incumbent was Democrat Sanford Bishop, who had represented the district since 1993. Bishop was unchallenged in the primary.

=== Democratic primary ===
==== Candidates ====
===== Nominee =====
- Sanford Bishop, incumbent U.S. representative

==== Results ====
Democratic primary results
Party	Candidate	Votes	%
Democratic	Sanford Bishop (incumbent)	55,880	100.0
Total votes		55,880	100.0

=== Republican primary ===
==== Candidates ====
===== Nominee =====
- Greg Duke, optician, former Lee County School Board member and nominee for this seat in 2014

===== Eliminated in primary =====
- Diane Vann, army nurse, candidate for Georgia's 8th congressional district in 2010 and Georgia's 12th congressional district in 2014

===== Withdrawn =====
- Bobby Scott

==== Results ====
Republican primary results
Party	Candidate	Votes	%
Republican	Greg Duke	12,959	79.0
Republican	Diane Vann	3,446	21.0
Total votes		16,405	100.0

=== General election ===
==== Predictions ====
Source	Ranking	As of
The Cook Political Report	Safe D	November 7, 2016
Daily Kos Elections	Safe D	November 7, 2016
Rothenberg	Safe D	November 3, 2016
Sabato's Crystal Ball	Safe D	November 7, 2016
RCP	Safe D	October 31, 2016

==== Results ====
Georgia's 2nd congressional district, 2016
Party	Candidate	Votes	%
Democratic	Sanford Bishop (incumbent)	148,543	61.2
Republican	Greg Duke	94,056	38.8
Total votes		242,599	100.0
Democratic hold			

== District 3 ==
2016 Georgia's 3rd congressional district election
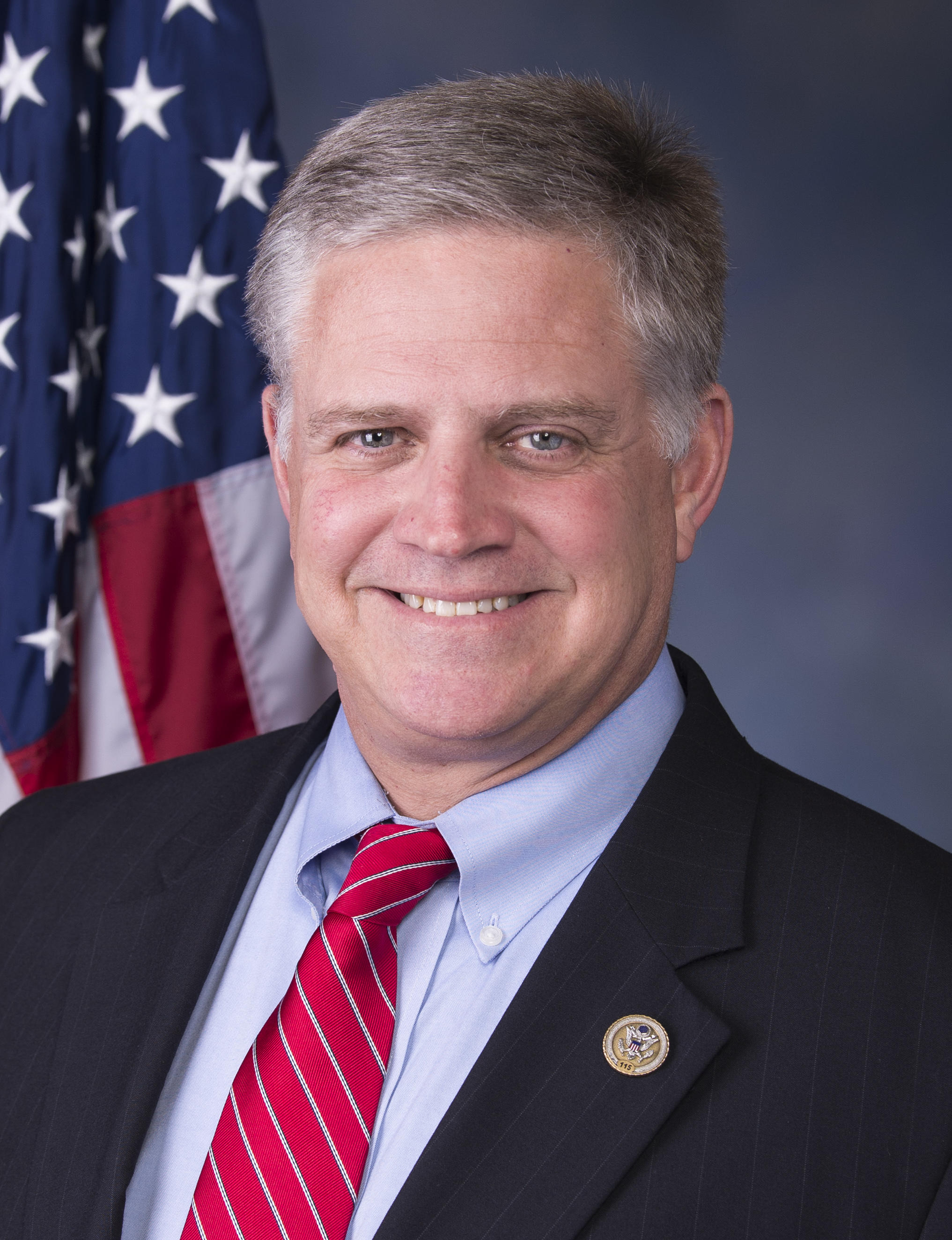

Nominee	Drew Ferguson	Angela Pendley
Party	Republican	Democratic
Popular vote	207,218	95,969
Percentage	68.3%	31.7%
- Ferguson: 50–60% 60–70% 70–80% 80–90% >90% Pendley: 50–60% 60–70% 70–80% 80–90%
U.S. Representative before election
Lynn Westmoreland
Republican
Elected U.S. Representative
Drew Ferguson
Republican

The incumbent was Republican Lynn Westmoreland, who had represented the district since 2005. Westmoreland announced he would not seek re-election.

=== Republican primary ===
==== Candidates ====
===== Nominee =====
- Drew Ferguson, former mayor of West Point

===== Eliminated in primary =====
- Sam Anders
- Mike Crane, state senator
- Chip Flanegan, business owner and candidate for this seat in 2012 & 2014
- Richard Mix
- Jim Pace
- Rod Thomas

===== Withdrawn =====
- Hayden Marlowe (running for state senate)

===== Declined =====
- Lynn Westmoreland, incumbent U.S. representative

==== Results ====
Results by county: Ferguson: 20–30%; 30–40%; 40–50%; 50–60%; Crane: 30–40%; 40–50%; Pace: 20–30%; 30–40%; 40–50%

Republican primary results
Party	Candidate	Votes	%
Republican	Mike Crane	15,584	26.9
Republican	Drew Ferguson	15,491	26.8
Republican	Jim Pace	13,312	23.0
Republican	Chip Flanegan	5,728	9.9
Republican	Richard Mix	5,285	9.1
Republican	Samuel Anders	1,657	2.9
Republican	Arnall "Rod" Thomas	812	1.4
Total votes		57,869	100.0

==== Runoff ====
Runoff results by county: Ferguson: 50–60%; 60–70%; 70–80%; Crane: 50–60%; 60–70%

Republican primary runoff results
Party	Candidate	Votes	%
Republican	Drew Ferguson	22,813	53.9
Republican	Mike Crane	19,490	46.1
Total votes		42,303	100.0

=== Democratic primary ===
==== Candidates ====
===== Nominee =====
- Angela Pendley

===== Eliminated in primary =====
- Tamarkus Cook, pastor

==== Results ====
Democratic primary results
Party	Candidate	Votes	%
Democratic	Angela Pendley	6,495	50.2
Democratic	Tamarkus Cook	6,444	49.8
Total votes		12,939	100.0

=== General election ===
==== Predictions ====
Source	Ranking	As of
The Cook Political Report	Safe R	November 7, 2016
Daily Kos Elections	Safe R	November 7, 2016
Rothenberg	Safe R	November 3, 2016
Sabato's Crystal Ball	Safe R	November 7, 2016
RCP	Safe R	October 31, 2016

==== Results ====
Georgia's 3rd congressional district, 2016
Party	Candidate	Votes	%
Republican	Drew Ferguson	207,218	68.3
Democratic	Angela Pendley	95,969	31.7
Total votes		303,187	100.0
Republican hold			

== District 4 ==
2016 Georgia's 4th congressional district election
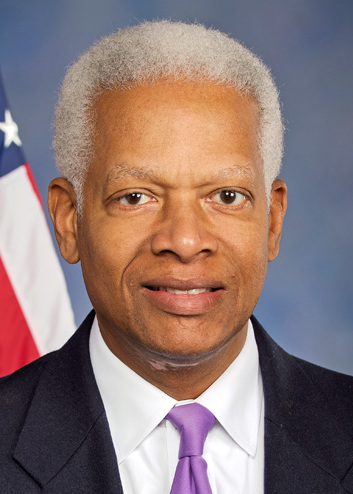

Nominee	Hank Johnson	Victor Armendariz
Party	Democratic	Republican
Popular vote	220,146	70,593
Percentage	75.7%	24.3%
- Johnson: 50–60% 60–70% 70–80% 80–90% >90% Armendariz: 50–60% 60–70% No votes
U.S. Representative before election
Hank Johnson
Democratic
Elected U.S. Representative
Hank Johnson
Democratic

The incumbent was Democratic Hank Johnson, who had represented the district since 2007. Johnson was unchallenged in the primary.

=== Democratic primary ===
==== Candidates ====
===== Nominee =====
- Hank Johnson, incumbent U.S. representative

==== Results ====
Democratic primary results
Party	Candidate	Votes	%
Democratic	Henry C. "Hank" Johnson Jr. (incumbent)	44,509	100.0
Total votes		44,509	100.0

=== Republican primary ===
==== Candidates ====
===== Nominee =====
- Victor Armendariz, business graduate

==== Results ====
Republican primary results
Party	Candidate	Votes	%
Republican	Victor Armendariz	10,260	100.0
Total votes		10,260	100.0

=== General election ===
==== Predictions ====
Source	Ranking	As of
The Cook Political Report	Safe D	November 7, 2016
Daily Kos Elections	Safe D	November 7, 2016
Rothenberg	Safe D	November 3, 2016
Sabato's Crystal Ball	Safe D	November 7, 2016
RCP	Safe D	October 31, 2016

==== Results ====
Georgia's 4th congressional district, 2016
Party	Candidate	Votes	%
Democratic	Hank Johnson (incumbent)	220,146	75.7
Republican	Victor Armendariz	70,593	24.3
Total votes		290,739	100.0
Democratic hold			

== District 5 ==
2016 Georgia's 5th congressional district election
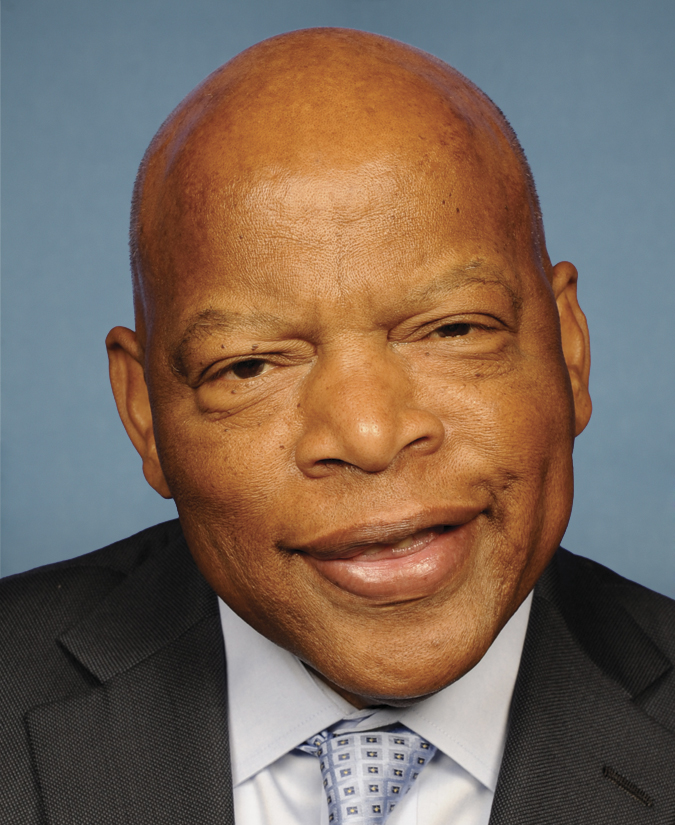

Nominee	John Lewis	Douglas Bell
Party	Democratic	Republican
Popular vote	253,781	46,768
Percentage	84.4%	15.6%
- County results Lewis: 80–90%
U.S. Representative before election
John Lewis
Democratic
Elected U.S. Representative
John Lewis
Democratic

The incumbent was Democratic John Lewis, who had represented the district since 1987. Lewis was unchallenged in the primary.

=== Democratic primary ===
==== Candidates ====
===== Nominee =====
- John Lewis, incumbent U.S. representative

==== Results ====
Democratic primary results
Party	Candidate	Votes	%
Democratic	John Lewis (incumbent)	47,313	100.0
Total votes		47,313	100.0

=== Republican primary ===
==== Candidates ====
===== Nominee =====
- Douglas Bell, small business owner

==== Results ====
Republican primary results
Party	Candidate	Votes	%
Republican	Douglas Bell	3,635	100.0
Total votes		3,635	100.0

=== General election ===
==== Predictions ====
Source	Ranking	As of
The Cook Political Report	Safe D	November 7, 2016
Daily Kos Elections	Safe D	November 7, 2016
Rothenberg	Safe D	November 3, 2016
Sabato's Crystal Ball	Safe D	November 7, 2016
RCP	Safe D	October 31, 2016

==== Results ====
Georgia's 5th congressional district, 2016
Party	Candidate	Votes	%
Democratic	John Lewis (incumbent)	253,781	84.4
Republican	Douglas Bell	46,768	15.6
Total votes		300,549	100.0
Democratic hold			

== District 6 ==
2016 Georgia's 6th congressional district election
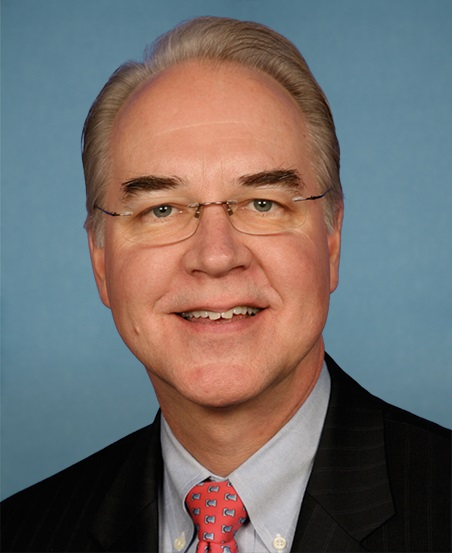

Nominee	Tom Price	Rodney Stooksbury
Party	Republican	Democratic
Popular vote	201,088	124,917
Percentage	61.2%	38.8%
- Price: 50–60% 60–70% 70–80% 80–90% Stooksbury: 50–60% 60–70% 70–80% No votes
U.S. Representative before election
Tom Price
Republican
Elected U.S. Representative
Tom Price
Republican

The incumbent was Republican Tom Price, who had represented the district since 2005.

=== Republican primary ===
==== Candidates ====
===== Nominee =====
- Tom Price, incumbent U.S. representative

==== Results ====
Republican primary results
Party	Candidate	Votes	%
Republican	Tom Price (incumbent)	32,021	100.0
Total votes		32,021	100.0

=== Democratic primary ===
==== Candidates ====
===== Nominee =====
- Rodney Stooksbury

==== Results ====
Democratic primary results
Party	Candidate	Votes	%
Democratic	Rodney Stooksbury	11,050	100.0
Total votes		11,050	100.0

=== General election ===
==== Predictions ====
Source	Ranking	As of
The Cook Political Report	Safe R	November 7, 2016
Daily Kos Elections	Safe R	November 7, 2016
Rothenberg	Safe R	November 3, 2016
Sabato's Crystal Ball	Safe R	November 7, 2016
RCP	Safe R	October 31, 2016

==== Results ====
Georgia's 6th congressional district, 2016
Party	Candidate	Votes	%
Republican	Tom Price (incumbent)	201,088	61.7
Democratic	Rodney Stooksbury	124,917	38.3
Total votes		326,005	100.0
Republican hold			

== District 7 ==
2016 Georgia's 7th congressional district election
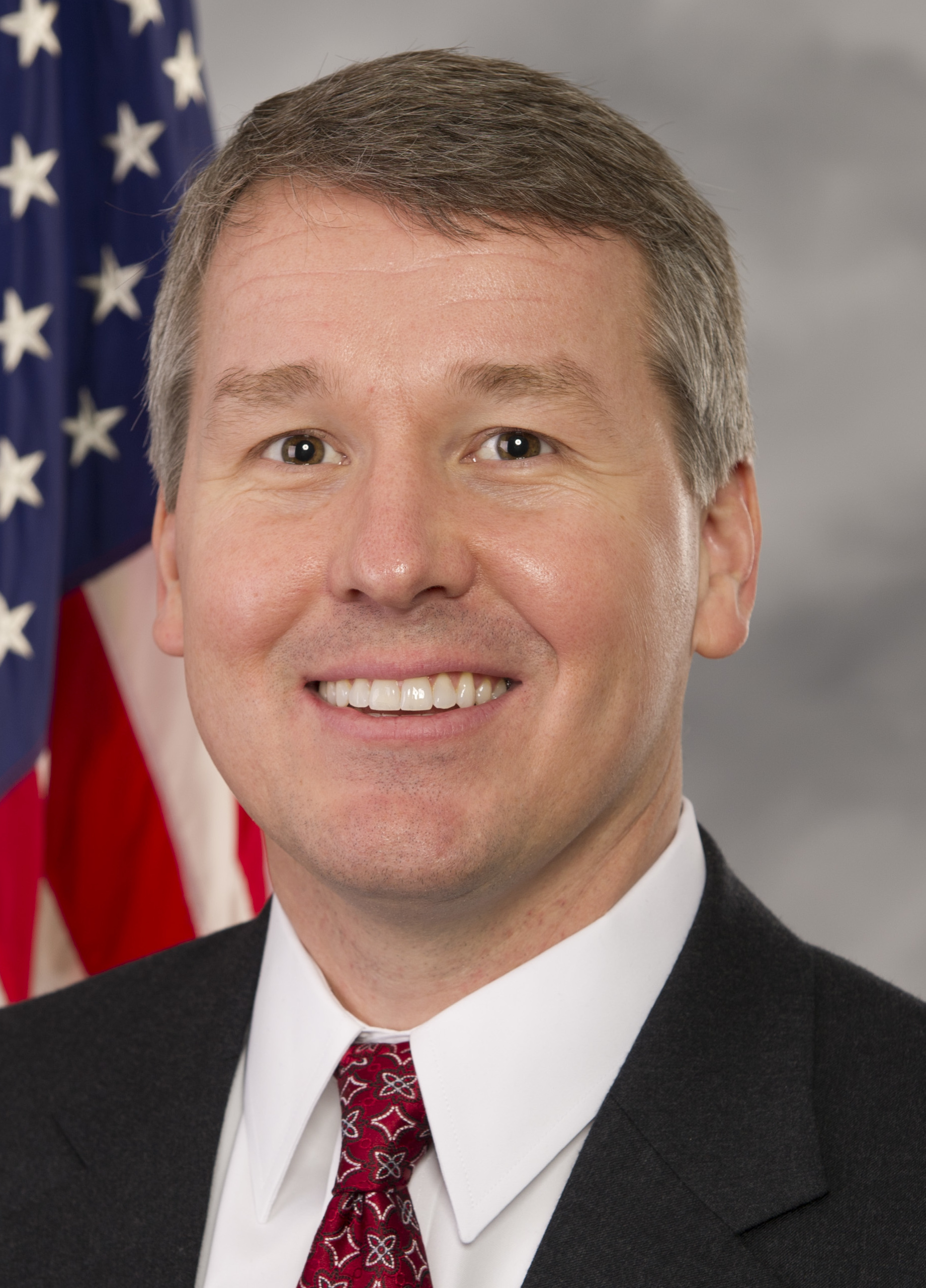

Nominee	Rob Woodall	Rashid Malik
Party	Republican	Democratic
Popular vote	174,081	114,220
Percentage	60.4%	39.6%
- Woodall: 50–60% 60–70% 70–80% 80–90% Malik: 50–60% 60–70% 70–80% 80–90% No votes
U.S. Representative before election
Rob Woodall
Republican
Elected U.S. Representative
Rob Woodall
Republican

The incumbent was Republican Rob Woodall, who had represented the district since 2011.

=== Republican primary ===
==== Candidates ====
===== Nominee =====
- Rob Woodall, incumbent U.S. representative

==== Results ====
Republican primary results
Party	Candidate	Votes	%
Republican	Rob Woodall (incumbent)	24,201	100.0
Total votes		24,201	100.0

=== Democratic primary ===
==== Candidates ====
===== Nominee =====
- Rashid Malik, entrepreneur and teacher

==== Results ====
Democratic primary results
Party	Candidate	Votes	%
Democratic	Rashid Malik	5,593	100.0
Total votes		5,593	100.0

=== General election ===
==== Predictions ====
Source	Ranking	As of
The Cook Political Report	Safe R	November 7, 2016
Daily Kos Elections	Safe R	November 7, 2016
Rothenberg	Safe R	November 3, 2016
Sabato's Crystal Ball	Safe R	November 7, 2016
RCP	Safe R	October 31, 2016

==== Results ====
Georgia's 7th congressional district, 2016
Party	Candidate	Votes	%
Republican	Rob Woodall (incumbent)	174,081	60.4
Democratic	Rashid Malik	114,220	39.6
Total votes		288,301	100.0
Republican hold			

== District 8 ==
2016 Georgia's 8th congressional district election
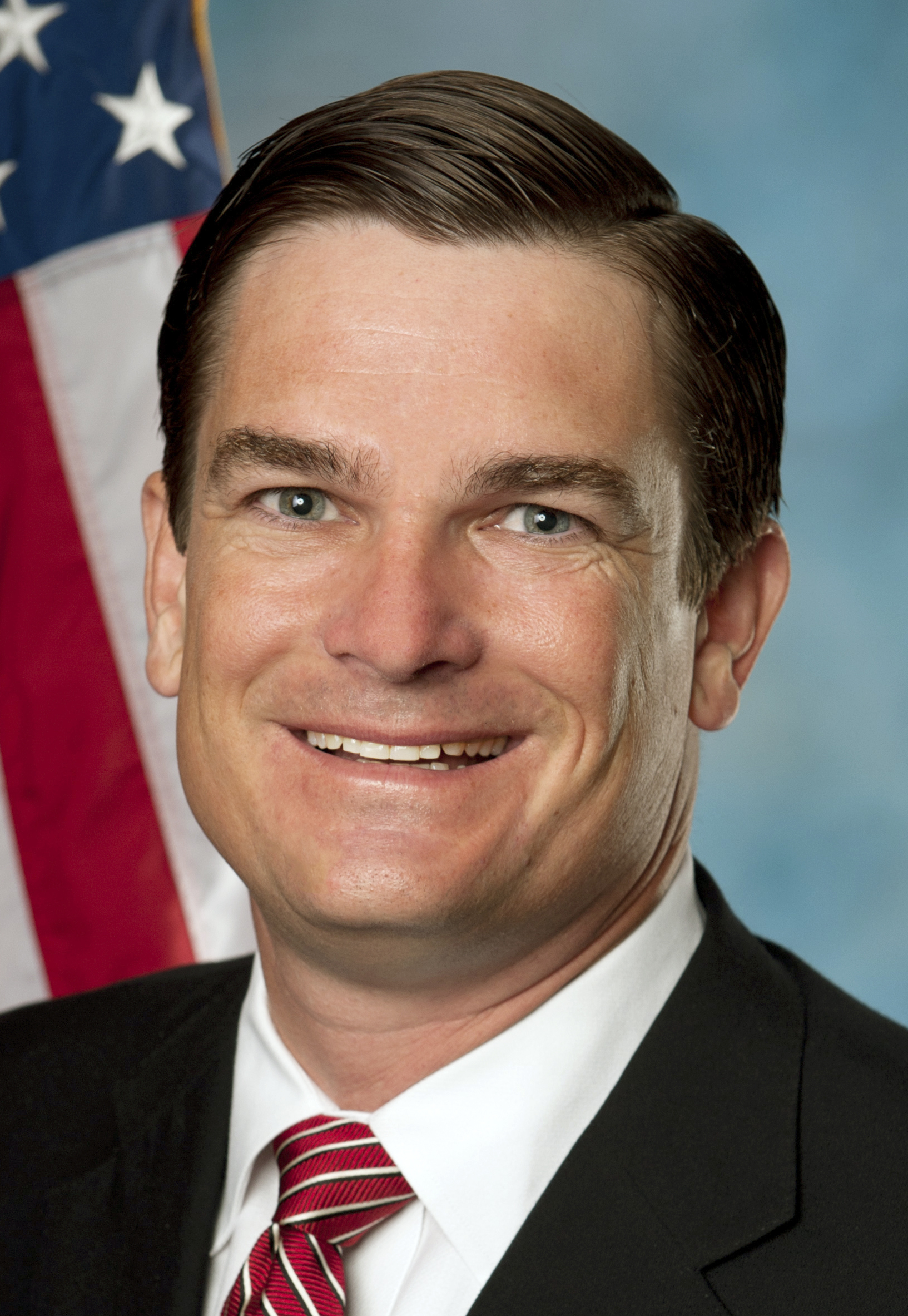

Nominee	Austin Scott	James Neal Harris
Party	Republican	Democratic
Popular vote	173,983	83,225
Percentage	67.6%	32.4%
- Scott: 50–60% 60–70% 70–80% 80–90% >90% Harris: 50–60% 60–70% 70–80% 80–90%
U.S. Representative before election
Austin Scott
Republican
Elected U.S. Representative
Austin Scott
Republican

The incumbent was Republican Austin Scott, who had represented the district since 2011.

=== Republican primary ===
==== Candidates ====
===== Nominee =====
- Austin Scott, incumbent U.S. representative

===== Eliminated in primary =====
- Angela Hicks, truck driver

==== Results ====
Republican primary results
Party	Candidate	Votes	%
Republican	Austin Scott (incumbent)	34,919	77.8
Republican	Angela Hicks	9,988	22.2
Total votes		44,907	100.0

=== Democratic primary ===
==== Candidates ====
===== Nominee =====
- James Neal Harris, retired deputy sheriff with Bibb County Sheriff’s Office and candidate for this seat in 2006

==== Results ====
Democratic primary results
Party	Candidate	Votes	%
Democratic	James Neal Harris	18,647	100.0
Total votes		18,647	100.0

=== General election ===
==== Predictions ====
Source	Ranking	As of
The Cook Political Report	Safe R	November 7, 2016
Daily Kos Elections	Safe R	November 7, 2016
Rothenberg	Safe R	November 3, 2016
Sabato's Crystal Ball	Safe R	November 7, 2016
RCP	Safe R	October 31, 2016

==== Results ====
Georgia's 8th congressional district, 2016
Party	Candidate	Votes	%
Republican	Austin Scott (incumbent)	173,983	67.6
Democratic	James Neal Harris	83,225	32.4
Total votes		257,208	100.0
Republican hold			

== District 9 ==
2016 Georgia's 9th congressional district election
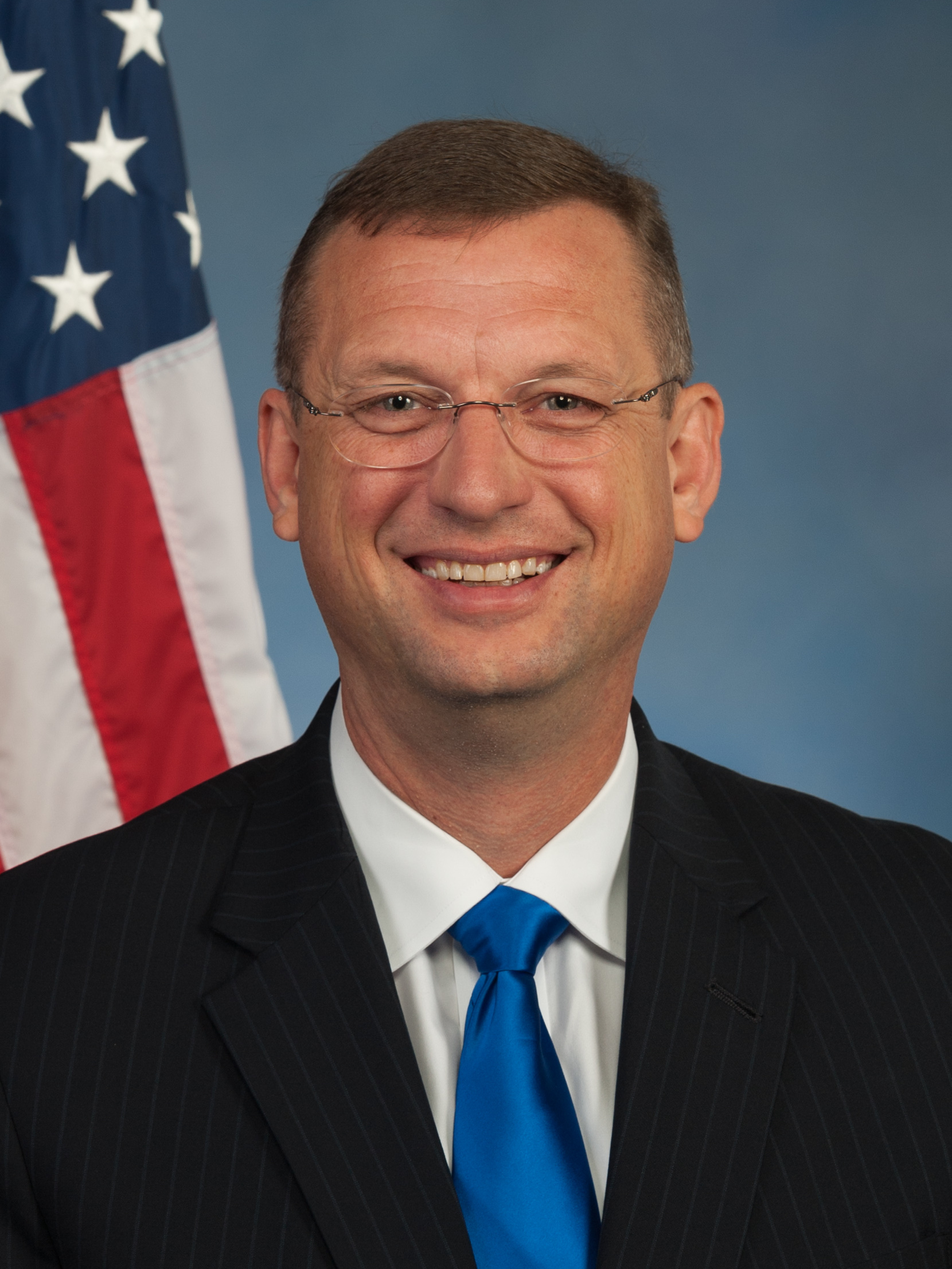
Nominee	Doug Collins
Party	Republican
Popular vote	256,535
Percentage	100.0%
- County results Collins: 100%
U.S. Representative before election
Doug Collins
Republican
Elected U.S. Representative
Doug Collins
Republican

The incumbent was Republican Doug Collins, who had represented northeastern Georgia since 2013. He was re-elected with 81% of the vote in 2014.

=== Republican primary ===
Radio host and former Hall County Commissioner Al Gainey considered running against Collins in the Republican primary, following Collins' vote to re-elect John Boehner as Speaker of the House.

==== Candidates ====
===== Nominee =====
- Doug Collins, incumbent U.S. representative

===== Eliminated in primary =====
- Paul Broun, former U.S. representative and candidate for U.S. Senate in 2014
- Roger Fitzpatrick, school principal and candidate for this seat in 2012
- Bernie Fontaine, candidate for this seat in 2014
- Mike Scupin

===== Declined =====
- Al Gainey, radio host and former Hall County commissioner

==== Results ====
Republican primary results
Party	Candidate	Votes	%
Republican	Doug Collins (incumbent)	52,080	61.3
Republican	Paul Broun	18,772	22.1
Republican	Roger Fitzpatrick	8,945	10.5
Republican	Mike Scupin	2,856	3.4
Republican	Bernie Fontaine	2,342	2.8
Total votes		84,995	100.0

=== General election ===
==== Predictions ====
Source	Ranking	As of
The Cook Political Report	Safe R	November 7, 2016
Daily Kos Elections	Safe R	November 7, 2016
Rothenberg	Safe R	November 3, 2016
Sabato's Crystal Ball	Safe R	November 7, 2016
RCP	Safe R	October 31, 2016

==== Results ====
Georgia's 9th congressional district, 2016
Party	Candidate	Votes	%
Republican	Doug Collins (incumbent)	256,535	100.0
Total votes		256,535	100.0
Republican hold			

== District 10 ==
2016 Georgia's 10th congressional district election
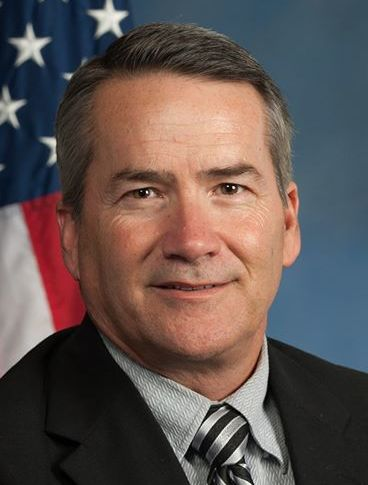
Nominee	Jody Hice
Party	Republican
Popular vote	243,725
Percentage	100.0%
- County results Hice: 100%
U.S. Representative before election
Jody Hice
Republican
Elected U.S. Representative
Jody Hice
Republican

The incumbent was Republican Jody Hice, who had represented the district since 2015.

=== Republican primary ===
==== Candidates ====
===== Nominee =====
- Jody Hice, incumbent U.S. representative

==== Results ====
Republican primary results
Party	Candidate	Votes	%
Republican	Jody Hice (incumbent)	49,062	100.0
Total votes		49,062	100.0

=== General election ===
==== Predictions ====
Source	Ranking	As of
The Cook Political Report	Safe R	November 7, 2016
Daily Kos Elections	Safe R	November 7, 2016
Rothenberg	Safe R	November 3, 2016
Sabato's Crystal Ball	Safe R	November 7, 2016
RCP	Safe R	October 31, 2016

==== Results ====
Georgia's 10th congressional district, 2016
Party	Candidate	Votes	%
Republican	Jody Hice (incumbent)	243,725	100.0
Total votes		243,725	100.0
Republican hold			

== District 11 ==
2016 Georgia's 11th congressional district election
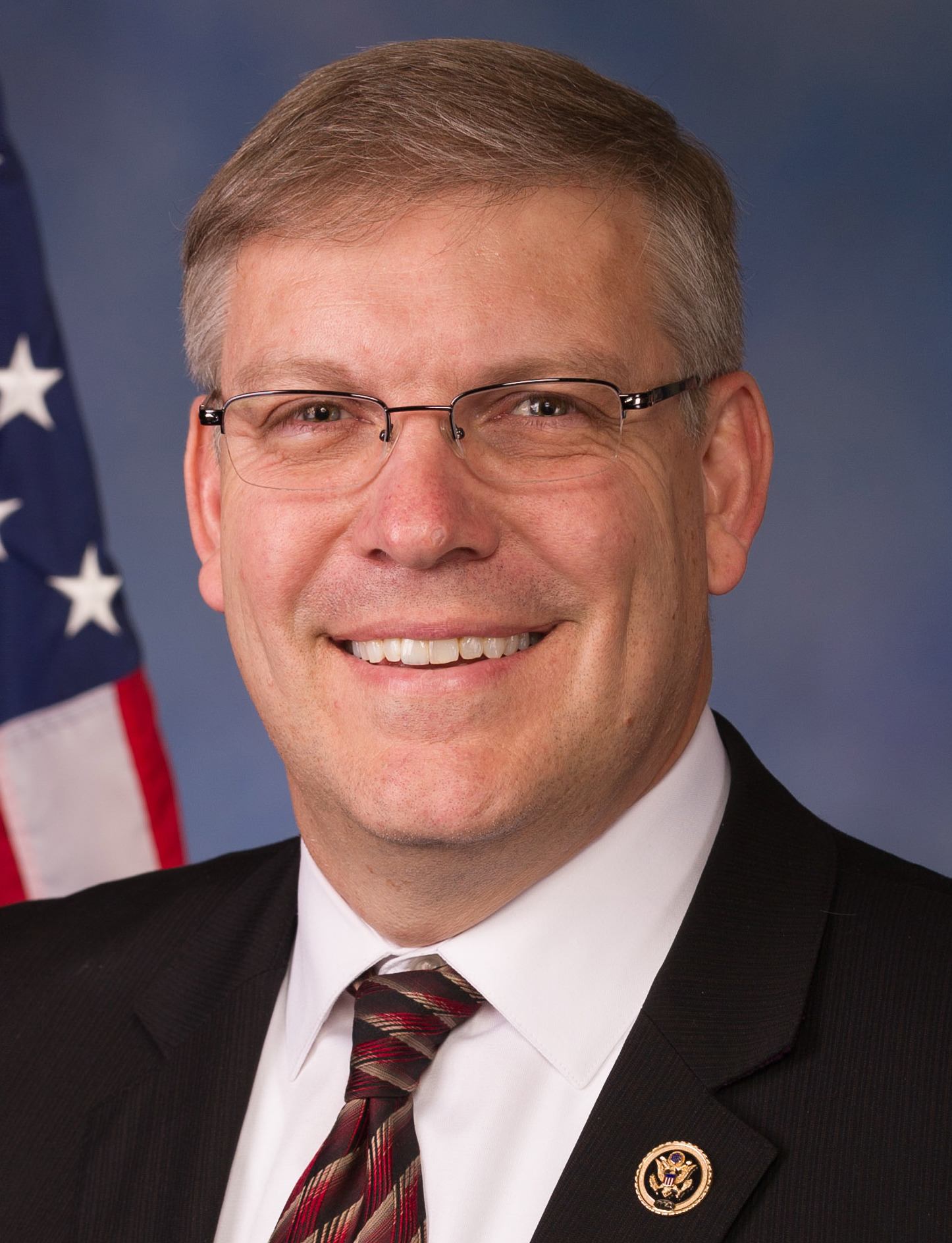

Nominee	Barry Loudermilk	Don Wilson
Party	Republican	Democratic
Popular vote	217,935	105,383
Percentage	67.4%	32.6%
- County results Loudermilk: 50–60% 60–70% 70–80%
U.S. Representative before election
Barry Loudermilk
Republican
Elected U.S. Representative
Barry Loudermilk
Republican

The incumbent was Republican Barry Loudermilk, who had represented the district since 2015.

=== Republican primary ===
==== Candidates ====
===== Nominee =====
- Barry Loudermilk, incumbent U.S. representative

===== Eliminated in primary =====
- Hayden Collins, radio talk show host
- Daniel Cowan, businessman
- Billy Davis
- William Llop, certified public accountant and candidate for this seat in 2012

==== Results ====
Republican primary results
Party	Candidate	Votes	%
Republican	Barry Loudermilk (incumbent)	29,903	60.3
Republican	Daniel Cowan	9,169	18.5
Republican	William Llop	4,857	9.8
Republican	Hayden Collins	3,247	6.5
Republican	Billy Davis	2,435	4.9
Total votes		49,611	100.0

=== Democratic primary ===
==== Candidates ====
===== Nominee =====
- Don Wilson

==== Results ====
Democratic primary results
Party	Candidate	Votes	%
Democratic	Don Wilson	6,861	100.0
Total votes		6,861	100.0

=== General election ===
==== Predictions ====
Source	Ranking	As of
The Cook Political Report	Safe R	November 7, 2016
Daily Kos Elections	Safe R	November 7, 2016
Rothenberg	Safe R	November 3, 2016
Sabato's Crystal Ball	Safe R	November 7, 2016
RCP	Safe R	October 31, 2016

==== Results ====
Georgia's 11th congressional district, 2016
Party	Candidate	Votes	%
Republican	Barry Loudermilk (incumbent)	217,935	67.4
Democratic	Don Wilson	105,383	32.6
Total votes		323,318	100.0
Republican hold			

== District 12 ==
2016 Georgia's 12th congressional district election
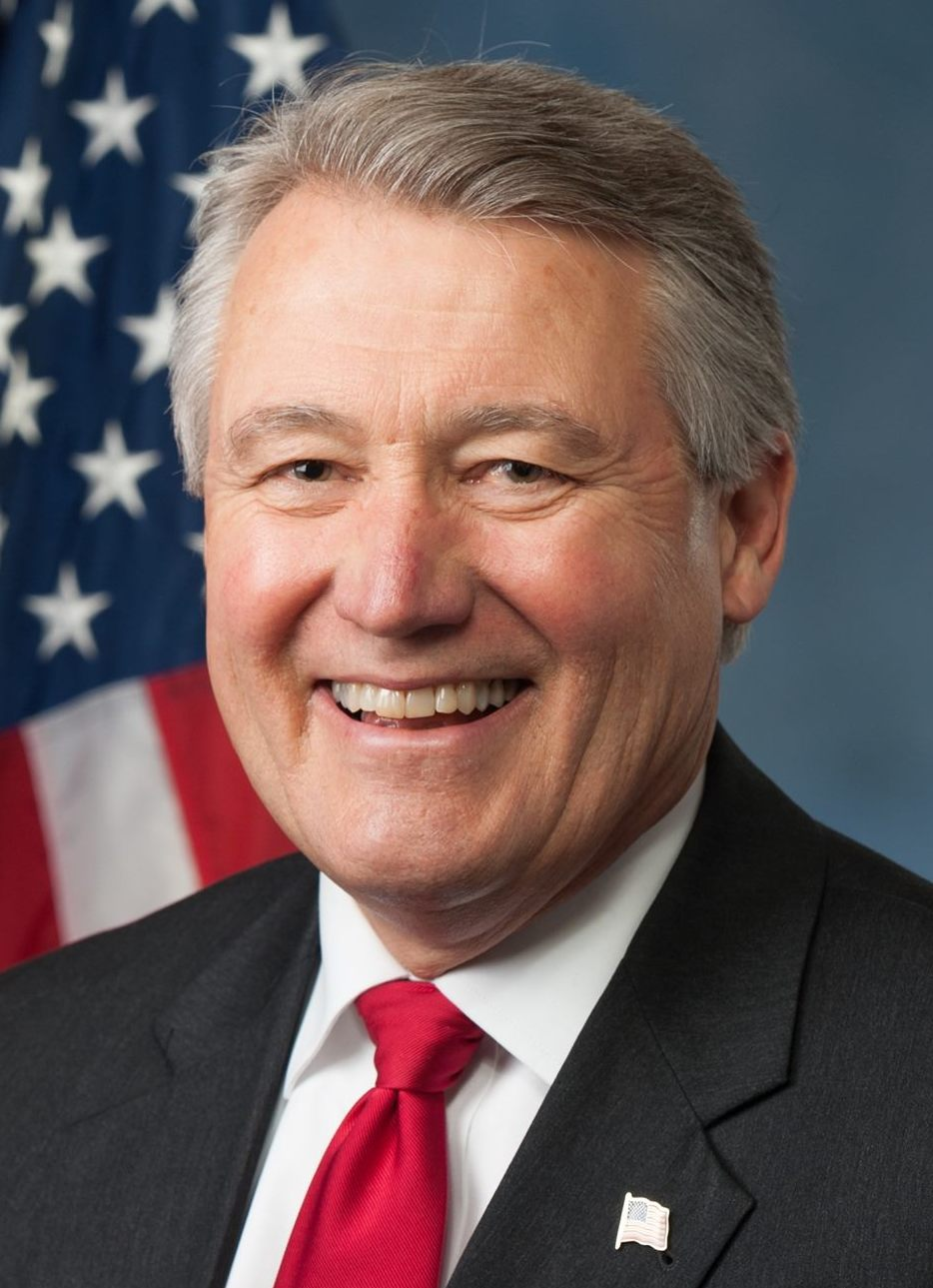

Nominee	Rick Allen	Tricia Carpenter McCracken
Party	Republican	Democratic
Popular vote	159,492	99,420
Percentage	61.6%	38.4%
- Allen: 50–60% 60–70% 70–80% 80–90% >90% McCracken: 50–60% 60–70% 70–80% 80–90% >90%
U.S. Representative before election
Rick W. Allen
Republican
Elected U.S. Representative
Rick W. Allen
Republican

The incumbent was Republican Rick W. Allen, who had represented the district since 2015.

=== Republican primary ===
==== Candidates ====
===== Nominee =====
- Rick W. Allen, incumbent U.S. representative

===== Eliminated in primary =====
- Eugene Yu, businessman and candidate for this seat in 2014

==== Results ====
Republican primary results
Party	Candidate	Votes	%
Republican	Rick Allen (incumbent)	46,686	79.0
Republican	Eugene Yu	12,441	21.0
Total votes		59,127	100.0

=== Democratic primary ===
==== Candidates ====
===== Nominee =====
- Tricia Carpenter McCracken, journalist

===== Eliminated in primary =====
- Joyce Nolin

==== Results ====
Democratic primary results
Party	Candidate	Votes	%
Democratic	Tricia Carpenter McCracken	16,138	62.3
Democratic	Joyce Nolin	9,787	37.7
Total votes		25,925	100.0

=== General election ===
==== Predictions ====
Source	Ranking	As of
The Cook Political Report	Safe R	November 7, 2016
Daily Kos Elections	Safe R	November 7, 2016
Rothenberg	Safe R	November 3, 2016
Sabato's Crystal Ball	Safe R	November 7, 2016
RCP	Safe R	October 31, 2016

==== Results ====
Georgia's 12th congressional district, 2016
Party	Candidate	Votes	%
Republican	Rick W. Allen (incumbent)	159,492	61.6
Democratic	Tricia Carpenter McCracken	99,420	38.4
Total votes		258,912	100.0
Republican hold			

== District 13 ==
2016 Georgia's 13th congressional district election
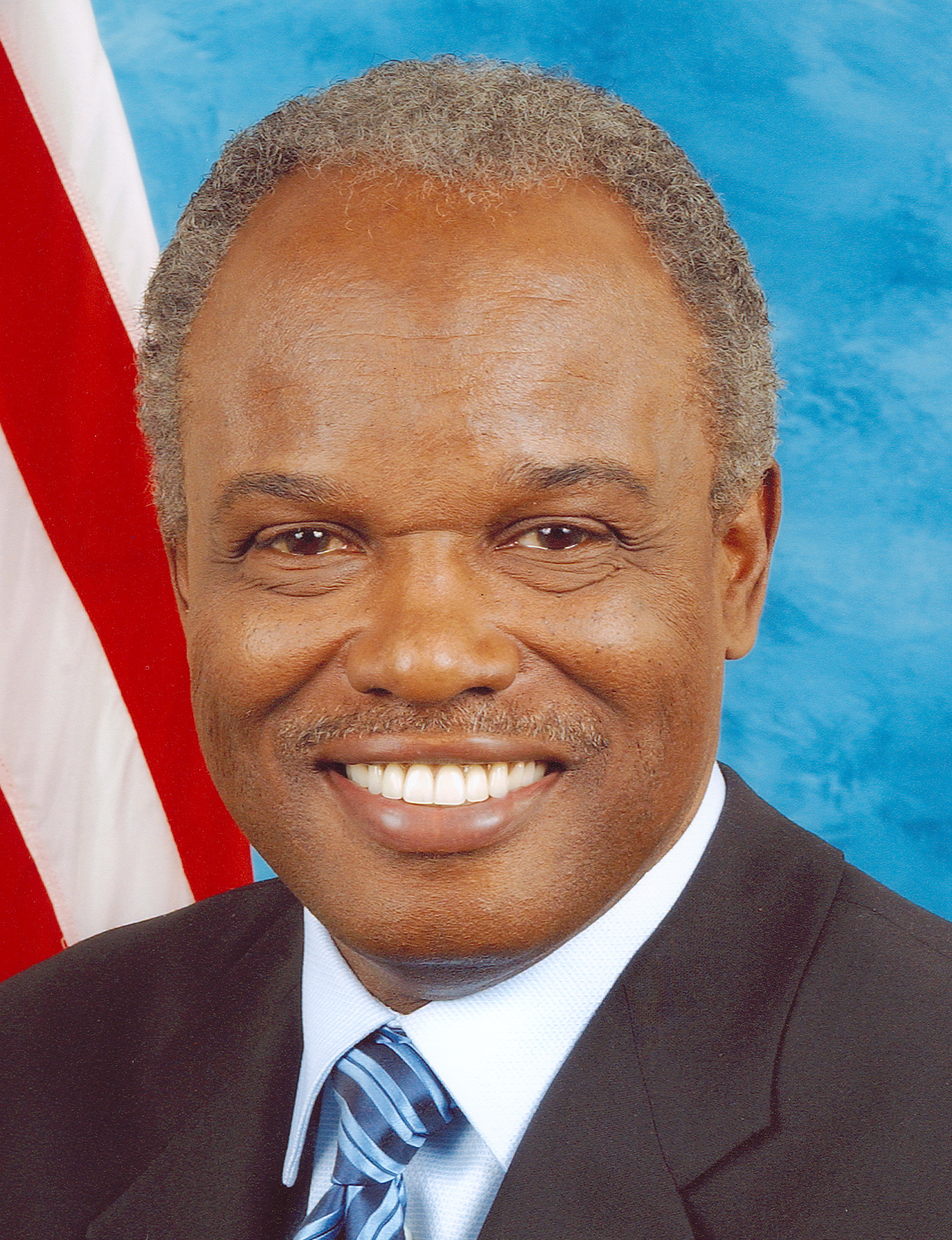
Nominee	David Scott
Party	Democratic
Popular vote	252,833
Percentage	100.0%
- County results Scott: 100%
U.S. Representative before election
David Scott
Democratic
Elected U.S. Representative
David Scott
Democratic

The incumbent was Democrat David Scott, who had represented the district since 2003.

=== Democratic primary ===
==== Candidates ====
===== Nominee =====
- David Scott, incumbent U.S. representative

==== Results ====
Democratic primary results
Party	Candidate	Votes	%
Democratic	David Scott (incumbent)	36,214	100.0
Total votes		36,214	100.0

=== General election ===
==== Predictions ====
Source	Ranking	As of
The Cook Political Report	Safe D	November 7, 2016
Daily Kos Elections	Safe D	November 7, 2016
Rothenberg	Safe D	November 3, 2016
Sabato's Crystal Ball	Safe D	November 7, 2016
RCP	Safe D	October 31, 2016

==== Results ====
Georgia's 13th congressional district, 2016
Party	Candidate	Votes	%
Democratic	David Scott (incumbent)	252,833	100.0
Total votes		252,833	100.0
Democratic hold			

== District 14 ==
2016 Georgia's 14th congressional district election
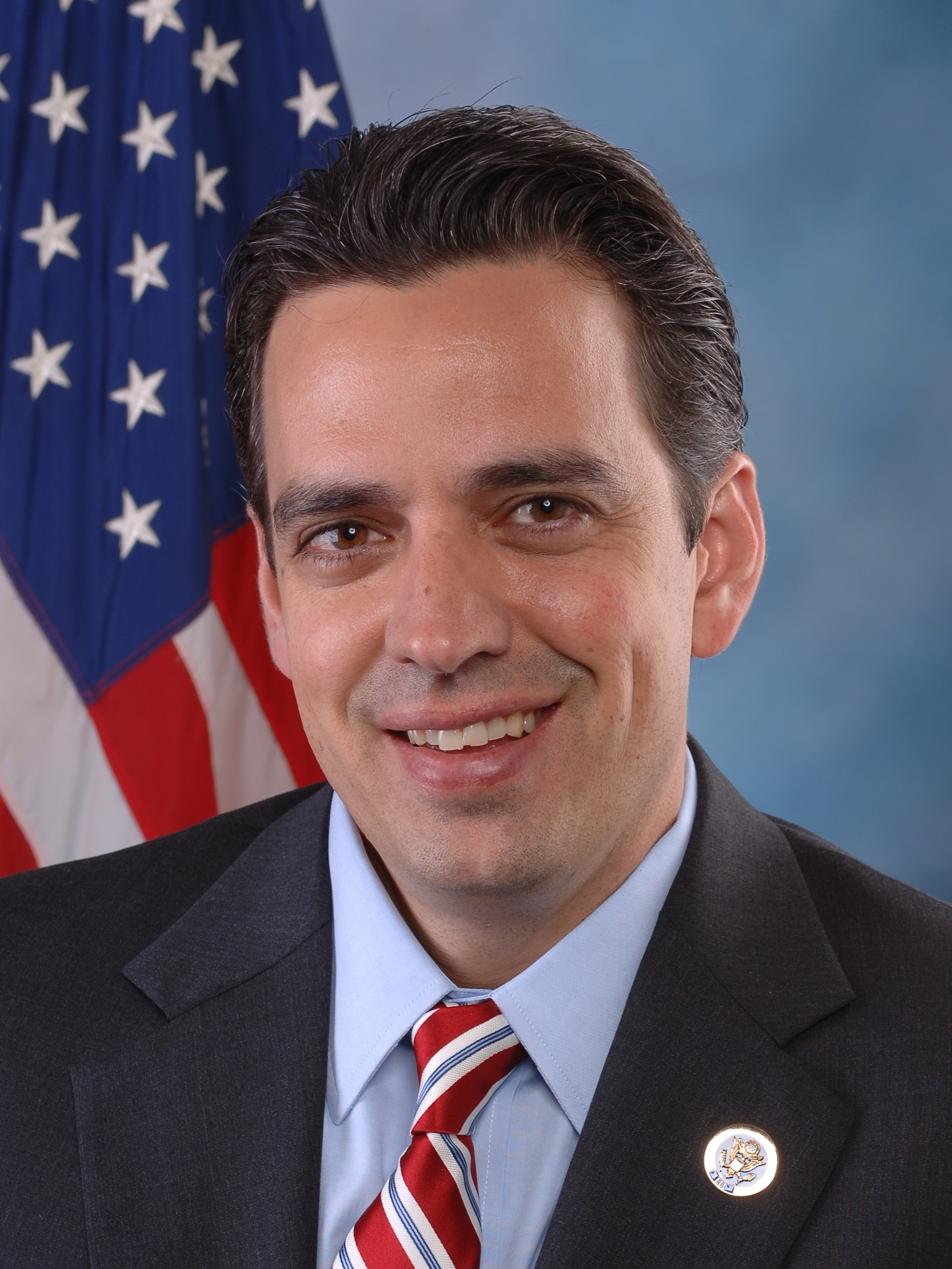
Nominee	Tom Graves
Party	Republican
Popular vote	216,743
Percentage	100.0%
- County results Graves: 100%
U.S. Representative before election
Tom Graves
Republican
Elected U.S. Representative
Tom Graves
Republican

The incumbent was Republican Tom Graves, who had represented northwestern Georgia since 2010. He was re-elected in 2014 with no general election opposition.

Mickey Tuck, an electrician and 1992 Floyd County Commission candidate, challenged Graves for the Republican nomination.

=== Republican primary ===
==== Candidates ====
===== Nominee =====
- Tom Graves, incumbent U.S. representative

===== Eliminated in primary =====
- Allan Levene, businessman and candidate for Georgia's 11th congressional district in 2014
- Mickey Tuck, electrician

==== Results ====
Republican primary results
Party	Candidate	Votes	%
Republican	Tom Graves (incumbent)	44,260	75.7
Republican	Mickey Tuck	7,493	12.8
Republican	Allan Levene	6,755	11.5
Total votes		58,508	100.0

=== General election ===
==== Predictions ====
Source	Ranking	As of
The Cook Political Report	Safe R	November 7, 2016
Daily Kos Elections	Safe R	November 7, 2016
Rothenberg	Safe R	November 3, 2016
Sabato's Crystal Ball	Safe R	November 7, 2016
RCP	Safe R	October 31, 2016

==== Results ====
Georgia's 14th congressional district, 2016
Party	Candidate	Votes	%
Republican	Tom Graves (incumbent)	216,743	100.0
Total votes		216,743	100.0
Republican hold			
