= 2010 Georgia's 9th congressional district special election =

Georgia's 9th congressional district special election, 2010
- June 8, 2010
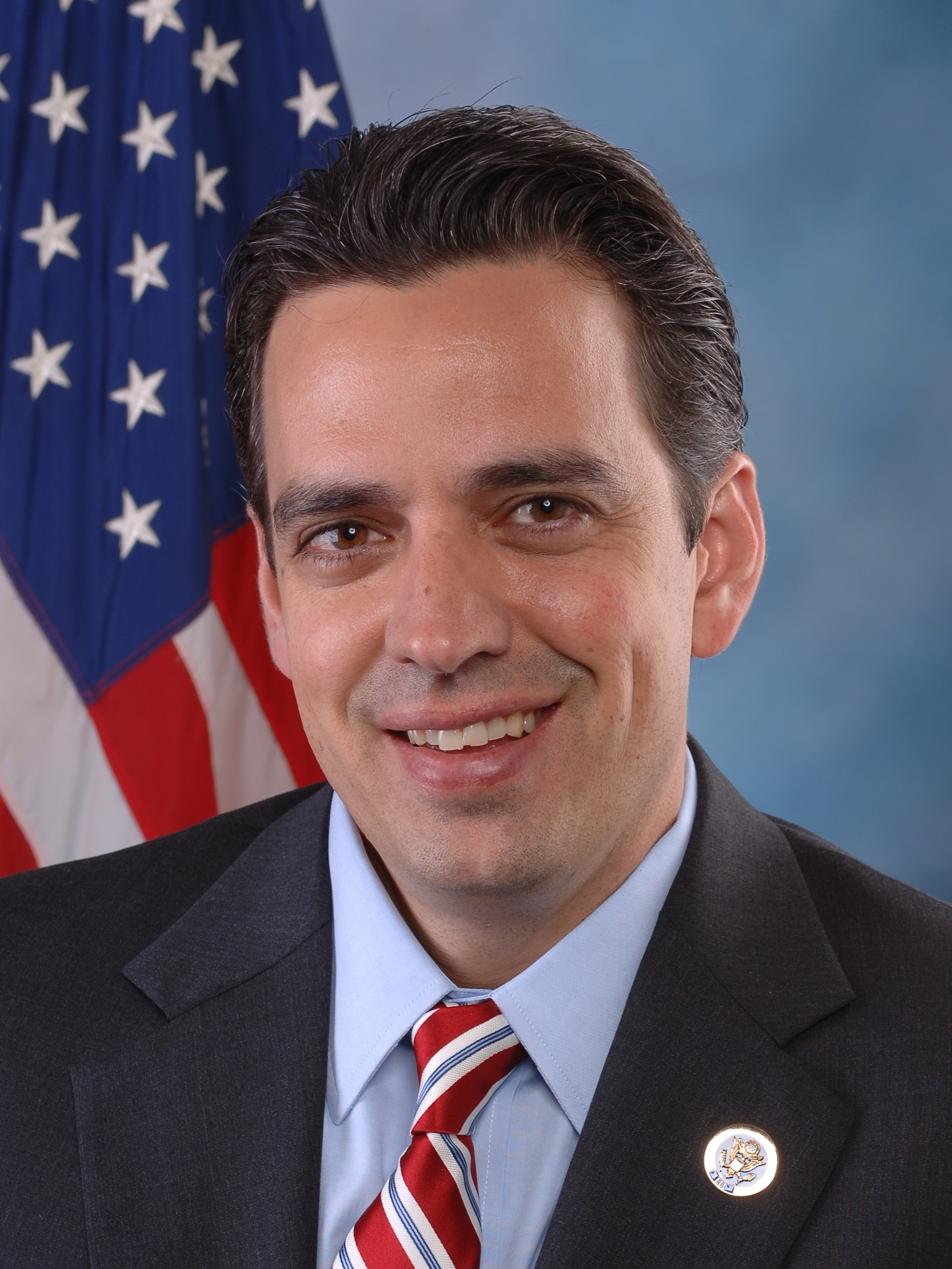

Candidate	Tom Graves	Lee Hawkins
Party	Republican	Republican
Popular vote	22,684	17,499
Percentage	56.45%	43.55%
- Runoff county results Graves: 50–60% 60–70% 70–80% 80–90% Hawkins: 50–60% 60–70%
Representative before election
Nathan Deal
Republican
Elected Representative
Tom Graves
Republican

The 2010 special election for the 9th congressional district of Georgia was held on May 11, 2010, to fill the seat left vacant by the resignation of Republican U.S. Representative Nathan Deal, who wished to concentrate on his campaign for Governor of Georgia. As no candidate received a majority in the special election, a runoff was held on June 8, 2010. The special election had originally been scheduled for April 27, but was postponed for the benefit of military and overseas voters.

== Background ==
Nathan Deal announced he was running for governor on May 1, 2009, and announced on March 1 that he would resign from Congress effective March 8 to pursue his candidacy. He was, however, persuaded to postpone his resignation until after voting on the Senate health care reform bill and health care reconciliation bill. On March 21, less than 10 minutes after the final vote, he officially resigned.

== Candidates ==
The following candidates have qualified for the ballot:

=== Republicans ===
- Chris Cates, cardiologist and Emory University medical professor
- Tom Graves, State Representative in District 12
- Lee Hawkins, State Senator in District 49
- Bert Loftman, neurosurgeon
- Bill Stephens, Vice President of Southern Highlands LLC and former Georgia State Senate Majority Leader
- Steve Tarvin, CEO of Crystal Springs Print Works Inc.

=== Democrat ===
- Mike Freeman, Episcopal minister

=== Independent ===
- Eugene Moon, marketing manager for Gainesville Welding and Rendering Equipment Inc.

== Special election results ==
2010 Georgia 9th Special Primary
Party	Candidate	Votes	%
Republican	Tom Graves	18,316	35.4
Republican	Lee Hawkins	12,012	23.2
Republican	Steve Tarvin	7,940	15.3
Republican	Chris Cates	6,137	11.8
Democratic	Mike Freeman	2,891	5.6
Republican	Bill Stephens	2,084	4.0
Republican	Bert Loftman	1,292	2.5
Independent	Eugene Moon	1,125	2.2
Total votes		51,797	100

== Run-off Results ==
No candidate won a majority of votes on May 11, so a runoff election was held between the two leading candidates, Lee Hawkins and Tom Graves.

2010 Georgia 9th Special Run-off
Party	Candidate	Votes	%
Republican	Tom Graves	22,694	56.45
Republican	Lee Hawkins	17,509	43.55
Total votes		40,203	100
