= Doug Collins (politician) =

American politician (born 1966)

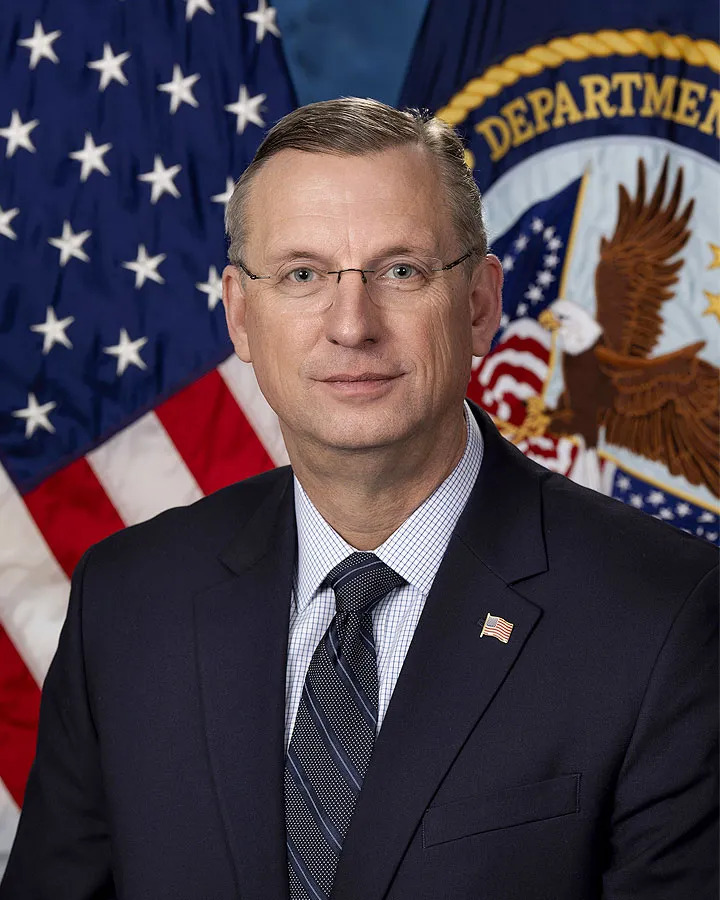
- Official portrait, 2025

12th United States Secretary of Veterans Affairs
- Incumbent
- Assumed office February 5, 2025
- President: Donald Trump
- Deputy: Paul Lawrence
- Preceded by: Denis McDonough
Other Administration positions
Acting Director of the United States Office of Government Ethics
In office February 12, 2025 – April 1, 2025
President	Donald Trump
Preceded by	Shelley Finlayson (acting)
Succeeded by	Jamieson Greer
Acting Special Counsel of the United States
In office March 5, 2025 – April 1, 2025
President	Donald Trump
Preceded by	Hampton Dellinger
Succeeded by	Jamieson Greer

Member of the U.S. House of Representatives from Georgia's 9th district
- In office January 3, 2013 – January 3, 2021
- Preceded by: Tom Graves (redistricted)
- Succeeded by: Andrew Clyde
U.S. House positions
Ranking Member of the House Judiciary Committee
In office January 3, 2019 – March 12, 2020
Preceded by	Jerry Nadler
Succeeded by	Jim Jordan
Vice Chair of the House Republican Conference
In office January 3, 2017 – January 3, 2019
Leader	Paul Ryan
Preceded by	Lynn Jenkins
Succeeded by	Mark Walker

Member of the Georgia House of Representatives from the 27th district
- In office January 3, 2007 – January 3, 2013
- Preceded by: Stacey Reece
- Succeeded by: Lee Hawkins

Personal details
- Born: Douglas Allen Collins; August 16, 1966 (age 60) Gainesville, Georgia, U.S.
- Party: Republican
- Spouse: Lisa Jordan (m. 1988)
- Children: 3
- Education: University of North Georgia (BA); New Orleans Baptist Theological Seminary (MDiv); Atlanta's John Marshall Law School (JD)
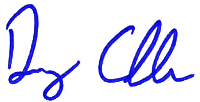
- Signature

Military service
- Allegiance: United States
- Branch/service: United States Air Force; Air Force Reserve
- Years of service: 2002–2026
- Rank: Colonel
- Unit: 94th Airlift Wing; Chaplain Corps
- Battles/wars: Iraq War; Operation Iraqi Freedom
- Collins's voice Collins supporting the 2018 Intercountry Adoption Information Act. Recorded July 10, 2018

Douglas Allen Collins (born August 16, 1966) is an American government official and politician serving as the 12th United States secretary of veterans affairs since February 2025. A member of the Republican Party, he previously served as the U.S. representative for Georgia's 9th congressional district from 2013 to 2021 and in the Georgia House of Representatives from 2007 to 2013, representing the 27th district, which includes portions of Hall County, Lumpkin County, and White County. Collins has served as a chaplain in the U.S. Air Force Reserve since 2002, and was promoted to colonel in 2023.

After Johnny Isakson resigned from the Senate, Collins announced he would run in the November 2020 special election to complete his term. He finished in third place in the state's nonpartisan blanket primary, behind Democrat Raphael Warnock and incumbent Republican Kelly Loeffler, failing to make it to the top-two runoff election. Collins was succeeded by Andrew Clyde in the House. After leaving office, Collins served as a legal counsel for Donald Trump.

On November 14, 2024, President-elect Donald Trump announced his intention to nominate Collins as the United States secretary of veterans affairs. Collins was confirmed by the United States Senate to the office on February 4, 2025, by a vote of 77–23, and took office the next day.

== Early life and education ==
Collins was born in Gainesville, Georgia. His father was a Georgia State Trooper for over 30 years. Collins is a graduate of North Hall High School. He attended North Georgia College & State University, where he received a Bachelor of Arts in political science and criminal law in 1988. He attended the New Orleans Baptist Theological Seminary, receiving his Master of Divinity (M.Div.) in 1996. Collins also earned his Juris Doctor from Atlanta's John Marshall Law School in 2007.

== Career ==
Collins worked as an intern for Georgia U.S. representative Ed Jenkins before working as a salesman, selling hazardous material safety products to Georgia's state and local governments. From 1994 to 2005, Collins was a senior pastor at Chicopee Baptist Church while co-owning a retail scrapbooking store with his wife, Lisa. Collins worked as a lawyer and has been a managing partner at the Collins and Csider law firm since 2010.

=== Military service ===
In the late 1980s, Collins served two years in the United States Navy as a navy chaplain. After the September 11 attacks, Collins joined the United States Air Force Reserve Command, where he presently serves as a chaplain (Colonel). As a member of the 94th Airlift Wing at Dobbins Air Reserve Base in Marietta, Georgia, Collins was deployed to Balad Air Base for five months in 2008 during the Iraq War.

== Georgia House of Representatives (2007–2013) ==
=== Elections ===
Collins served three terms in the Georgia House of Representatives, representing Georgia's 9th district from 2007 to 2013. After Republican incumbent state representative Stacey Reece decided he would run for the Georgia State Senate, Collins announced he would run for the vacated seat. He won both the primary and general elections unopposed. He was unopposed for reelection in 2008 and 2010.

=== Tenure ===
In 2011, Collins sponsored a plan proposed by Georgia governor Nathan Deal to reform Georgia's HOPE Scholarship program. The bill allowed for a 10% cut in scholarships and raised the level of SAT test scores and GPA required to obtain a scholarship, saving the state $300 million. Collins argued that the program would be insolvent without the cut, saying that "If you look at it at the end of the day, Georgia still leads the way in providing hope—educational hope—for those wanting to go on to post-secondary education." In 2012, he supported amending Georgia's constitution to establish a statewide commission authorizing and expanding charter schools.

In 2012, Collins signed a pledge sponsored by Americans for Prosperity promising to vote against any global warming-related legislation that would raise taxes.

=== Committee assignments ===
In the 2011–2012 legislative session, Collins was one of three administrative floor leaders for Georgia governor Nathan Deal. Collins served on the committees for:

- House Appropriations (Secretary)
- Judiciary Non-Civil
- Public Safety & Homeland Security
- Health & Human Services
- Defense and Veterans Affairs

== U.S. House of Representatives (2013–2021) ==
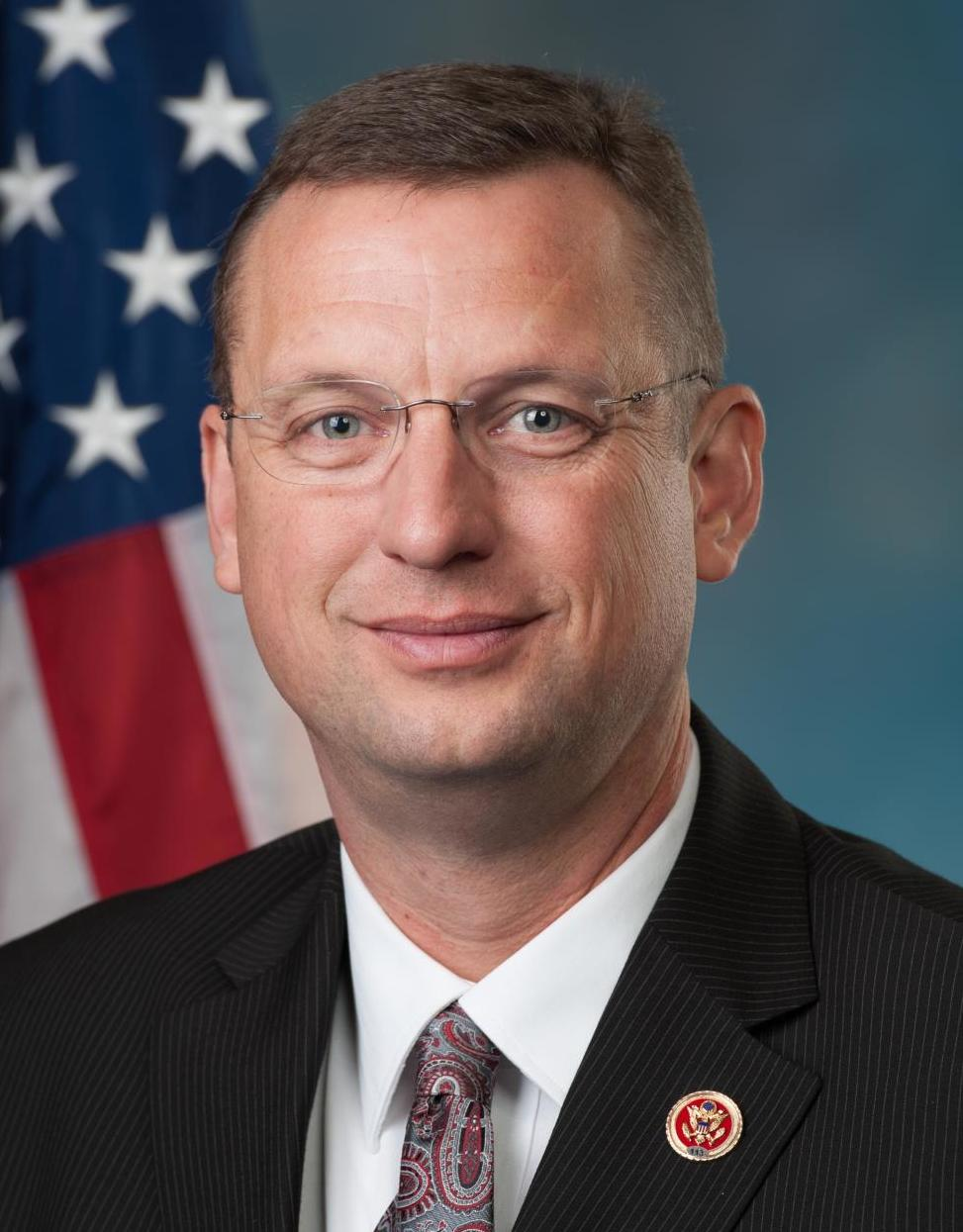
Official portrait, 113th Congress

=== 2012 election ===
In 2012, Collins ran for Congress in the redrawn 9th congressional district. The district's incumbent, Tom Graves, opted instead to run in the newly created 14th district, which had absorbed his home in Ranger. Collins faced local media personality Martha Zoller and retired principal Roger Fitzpatrick in the Republican primary. The 9th was the most Republican district in the Eastern Time Zone, with a Cook Partisan Voting Index of R+27. As a result, whoever won the Republican primary would almost certainly be the district's next representative in Congress.

Collins finished first in the primary with 42 percent of the total, but just 700 votes ahead of Zoller. Because neither had a majority, a runoff was held on August 21, 2012, and Collins defeated Zoller in that contest 55 percent to 45 percent. In the general election, Collins defeated Democrat Jody Cooley 76 percent to 24 percent.

=== 2018 election ===
After running unopposed in the 2016 election, Collins faced Democratic challenger Josh McCall in the 2018 election. Collins overwhelmingly defeated McCall with 79.6% of the vote, compared to McCall's 20.4%.

=== Committee assignments ===
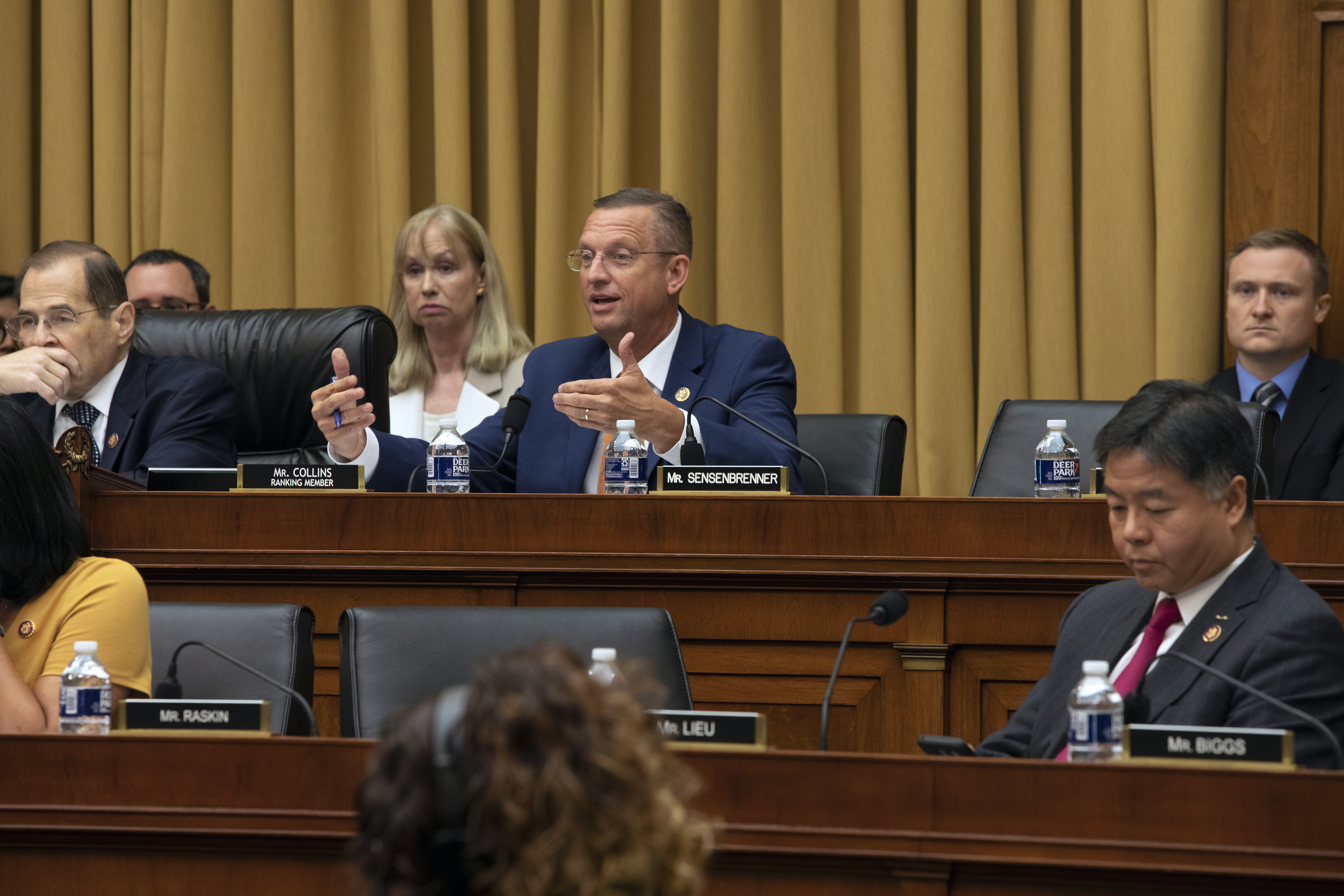
Collins speaks in 2019 as the ranking member of the House Judiciary Committee

- United States House Committee on Rules
- United States House Committee on the Judiciary
  - Subcommittee on Courts, Intellectual Property and the Internet
  - Subcommittee on Regulatory Reform, Commercial and Antitrust Law
- Committee on Oversight and Government Reform
  - Subcommittee on Federal Workforce, U.S. Postal Service and the Census
  - Subcommittee on Economic Growth, Job Creation and Regulatory Affairs

=== Caucus memberships ===
- U.S.-Japan Caucus

== 2020 U.S. Senate election ==
In January 2020, Collins announced his candidacy for the United States Senate. He ran in the special election held in November 2020 to complete the final two years of the term of retiring senator Johnny Isakson, who stepped down on December 31, 2019, citing health issues. Collins faced incumbent senator Kelly Loeffler, a Republican appointed by Georgia governor Brian Kemp to fill the seat until a special election was held. Trump had supported Collins as a replacement for Isakson.

Collins faced some initial resistance to his candidacy from senior Senate Republicans as well as from the Senate Leadership Fund (a political action committee aligned with Majority Leader Mitch McConnell) and from the National Republican Senatorial Committee, both of which backed Loeffler. Per Georgia election law, all candidates for that Senate seat (regardless of political party) competed in a nonpartisan blanket primary. If no candidate successfully earned over 50% of the vote, the top two finishers would participate in a runoff election in January 2021.

After both Collins, who finished third in the primary, and Trump lost their respective races in Georgia, they made claims about fraud in the Georgia elections. Georgia's Republican secretary of state Brad Raffensperger called Collins a "liar" and "charlatan" for his statements. Collins endorsed Loeffler in the runoff election following his primary defeat.

== Secretary of Veterans Affairs (2025–present) ==
=== Nomination and confirmation ===
On November 14, 2024, President-elect Donald Trump announced his nomination of Collins to serve as U.S. Secretary of Veterans Affairs in the second Trump administration. Collins' nomination was endorsed by the Wounded Warrior Project, AMVETS, Blinded Veterans Association, Military-Veterans Advocacy, National Defense Committee, Burn Pits 360, Wounded Paw Project, Mission Roll Call, Armed Forces Retirees Association, Heroes Athletic Association, Mission: POW/MIA, Jewish War Veterans of the USA, 75th Ranger Regiment Association, Military Order of the Purple Heart, America’s Warrior Partnership, and The Enlisted Association and the Stronghold Freedom Foundation.

Collins appeared before the U.S. Senate Committee on Veterans' Affairs on January 21, 2025. The committee advanced Collins' nomination in a 18–1 vote on January 23, 2025. On February 4, 2025, the United States Senate confirmed Collins by a 77–23 vote.

=== Tenure ===
On February 5, 2025, Collins was sworn into office by U.S. Supreme Court justice Clarence Thomas as the 12th Secretary of Veterans Affairs.

On March 4, 2025, Collins served as the "designated survivor" during President Trump's address to a joint session of Congress. He again served as the designated survivor during the 2026 State of the Union Address.

On March 5, 2025, Collins announced 72,000 jobs (15% of department employees nationwide) would be terminated from the department. Collins stated that healthcare and other critical workers under the department would not be affected by the layoffs.

== Political positions ==
=== Abortion ===
Collins opposes abortion. Hours after Supreme Court justice Ruth Bader Ginsburg died in September 2020, Collins wrote on Twitter: "RIP to the more than 30 million innocent babies that have been murdered during the decades that Ruth Bader Ginsburg defended pro-abortion laws. With @realDonaldTrump nominating a replacement that values human life, generations of unborn children have a chance to live."

=== Health care ===
Collins opposes the Affordable Care Act, also known as Obamacare. He called it an "experiment [that] has continued to fail America" and "costly for my neighbors". Collins said the passage of the Tax Cuts and Jobs Act of 2017 would not result in anyone losing health coverage.

=== President Donald Trump ===
In 2020, Collins was described as an "ardent Trump ally." He strongly defended Trump during his impeachment inquiry over the Trump-Ukraine scandal, saying that the hearings were a "sham". During his bid for the Georgia Senate seat in 2020, Collins campaigned with Roger Stone. Among the two major Republican contenders for the 2020–21 United States Senate special election in Georgia, Kelly Loeffler and Collins tried to distinguish themselves as the candidate most aligned with Trump.

In December 2020, Collins was one of 126 Republican members of the House of Representatives who signed an amicus brief in support of Texas v. Pennsylvania, a lawsuit filed at the United States Supreme Court contesting the results of the 2020 presidential election, in which Joe Biden defeated Trump. The Supreme Court declined to hear the case on the basis that Texas lacked standing under Article III of the Constitution to challenge the results of the election held by another state.

=== Tax reform ===
Collins voted in favor of the Tax Cuts and Jobs Act of 2017. He said the bill would encourage businesses to create more jobs and that the economy and communities would strengthen. He said, "We're making the IRS less ravenous and putting more money back in the hands of American families so that they can pursue more of their ambitions on their own terms."

=== LGBTQ rights ===
Collins opposes same-sex marriage. In 2015, he said, "I strongly support a constitutional amendment defining marriage between one man and one woman."

Collins also opposes the Equality Act, a bill that would expand the federal Civil Rights Act of 1964 to ban discrimination based on sexual orientation and gender identity. He voted against the bill in 2019.

Collins has written letters in defense of military chaplain Wes Modder, whom the Navy attempted to fire after he had allegedly berated students at the Naval Nuclear Power Training Command (where he was posted) who had gone to him for counseling. Modder allegedly made anti-gay comments and berated students for engaging in premarital sex.

=== Foreign policy ===
Collins supported President Donald Trump's 2017 executive order to impose a temporary ban on entry to the U.S. for citizens of seven Muslim-majority countries. He explained that "The executive order allows re-entry to lawful permanent residents and does not represent a comprehensive ban on entry to people from certain countries. In this temporary measure, President Trump has given us the opportunity to get refugee policy right going forward."

In the aftermath of the January 2020 killing of Iranian general Qasem Soleimani, Collins said during an interview on Lou Dobbs Tonight that Democrats were "in love with terrorists" and "mourn Soleimani more than they mourn our Gold Star families who are the ones who suffered under Soleimani." Democratic responses were quick, with Senator Tammy Duckworth, an Iraq War veteran who lost both legs in combat, responding, "I left parts of my body behind fighting terrorists in Iraq. I don't need to justify myself to anyone." After first defending his claims on Fox News, Collins apologized on Twitter, saying, "Let me be clear: I do not believe Democrats are in love with terrorists, and I apologize for what I said earlier this week."

== Military awards and decorations ==
(Note: Air Force Christian Chaplains Insignia; Meritorious Service Medal; Air and Space Commendation Medal with Bronze Oak Leaf; Air and Space Achievement Medal; Air Force Meritorious Unit Award with Bronze Oak Leaf; Air and Space Outstanding Unit Award with Bronze Oak Leaf; National Defense Service Medal with Bronze Star; Iraq Campaign Medal with Bronze Star; Global War on Terrorism Service Medal; Air Force Expeditionary Service Ribbon with Gold Frame; Air and Space Longevity Service Award; Armed Forces Reserve Medal; Air Force Training Ribbon.)

== Personal life ==
Collins married his wife, Lisa Jordan, in 1988. She is a retired fifth grade teacher at Mount Vernon Elementary School in Gainesville, Georgia, where the couple resides. They have three children, one of whom has spina bifida. Collins is a practicing Southern Baptist, and attends Lakewood Baptist Church.

== Books ==
- The Clock and the Calendar: A Front-Row Look at the Democrats' Obsession with Donald Trump, 2021. (ISBN 978-1637580882).

== Notes ==
U.S. House of Representatives
Preceded by Tom Graves	Member of the U.S. House of Representatives from Georgia's 9th congressional district 2013–2021	Succeeded by Andrew Clyde
Preceded by Jerry Nadler	Ranking Member of the House Judiciary Committee; 2019–2020	Succeeded by Jim Jordan
Party political offices
Preceded by Lynn Jenkins	Vice Chair of the House Republican Conference; 2017–2019	Succeeded by Mark Walker
Political offices
Preceded by Denis McDonough	United States Secretary of Veterans Affairs; 2025–present	Incumbent
Order of precedence
Preceded by Linda McMahon as United States Secretary of Education	Order of precedence of the United States as Secretary of Veterans Affairs	Succeeded by Markwayne Mullin as United States Secretary of Homeland Security
U.S. presidential line of succession
Preceded by Linda McMahon as United States Secretary of Education	Seventeenth in line as Secretary of Veterans Affairs	Succeeded by Markwayne Mullin as United States Secretary of Homeland Security
