= Martin Momtahan =

American politician

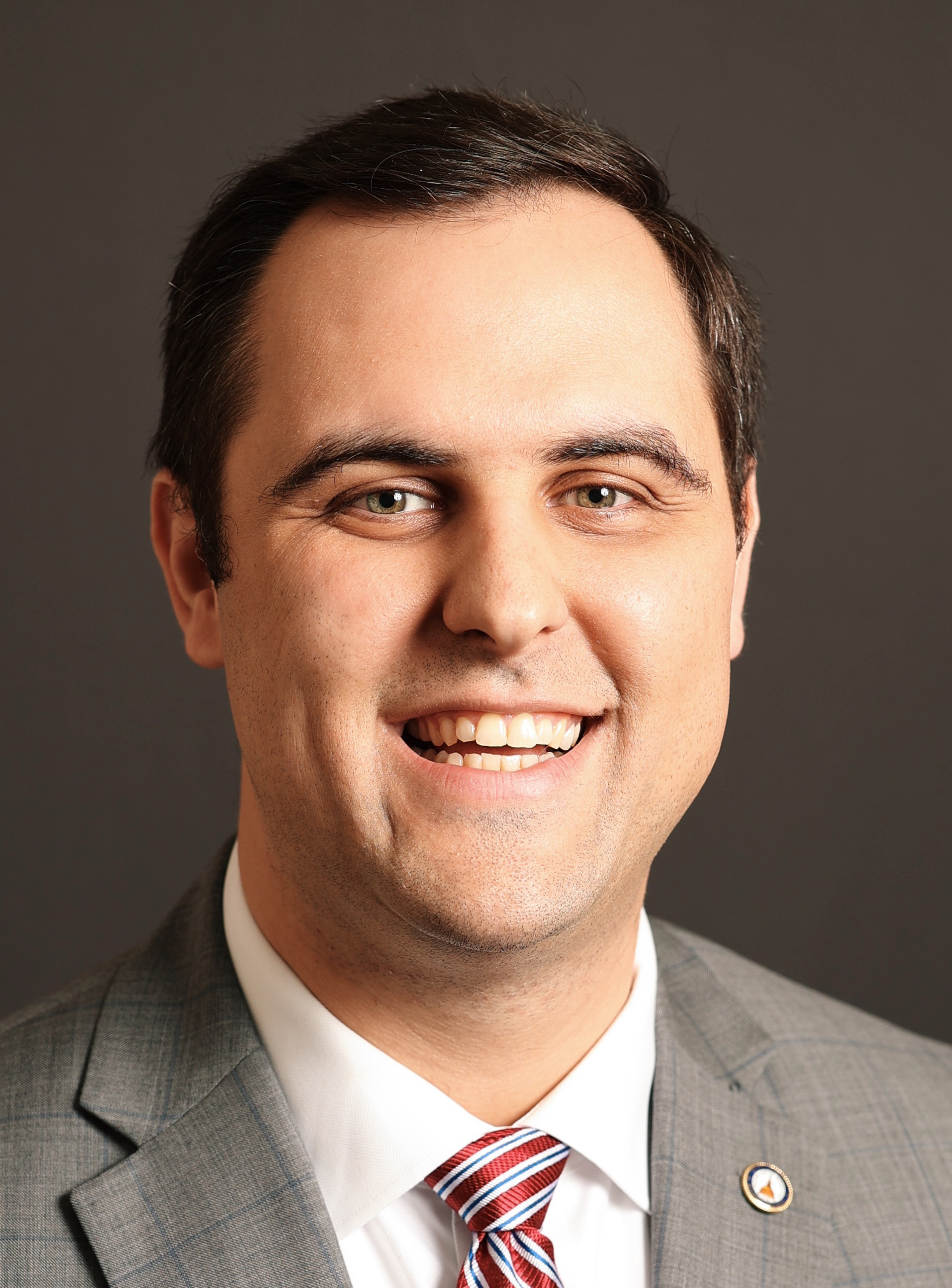

Member of the Georgia House of Representatives from the 17th district
- Incumbent
- Assumed office January 14, 2019
- Preceded by: Howard Maxwell

Personal details
- Born: Martin Arash Momtahan; March 31, 1989 (age 37)
- Party: Republican

Martin Arash Momtahan (born March 31, 1989) is an American politician who has served in the Georgia House of Representatives for the 17th district since 2019.
