= Georgia's 17th House of Representatives district =

State district in Georgia, USA

Georgia's 17th State House of Representatives district
Representative
Martin Momtahan; R–Dallas
- Demographics: 74.8% White; 16.8% Black; 4.7% Hispanic; 1.1% Asian
- Population: 58,516

District 17 elects one member of the Georgia House of Representatives. It contains parts of Paulding County.

== Members ==
- Bobby Franklin (until 2005)
- Howard Maxwell (2005–2019)
- Martin Momtahan (since 2019)
