= Stacey Reece =

American politician in Georgia

Stacey Reece is a politician in the state of Georgia. He served in the Georgia House of Representatives representing District 27. He has lived in Gainesville, Georgia.

He attended Gainesville College and North Georgia College and State University.

He was born in Dawson County, Georgia. He represented Hall County, Georgia. He campaigned for a Department of Transportation board seat.

He was succeeded by Doug Collins.
