= Georgia's 27th House of Representatives district =

State district in Georgia, USA

Georgia's 27th State House of Representatives district
Representative
Lee Hawkins; R–Gainesville
- Demographics: 77.0% White; 3.6% Black; 16.8% Hispanic; 0.9% Asian
- Population: 54,302

District 27 elects one member of the Georgia House of Representatives. It contains parts of Hall County and Lumpkin County.

== Members ==
- Stacey Reece (until 2007)
- Doug Collins (2007–2013)
- Lee Hawkins (since 2013)
