= Tom Graves =

American politician (born 1970)

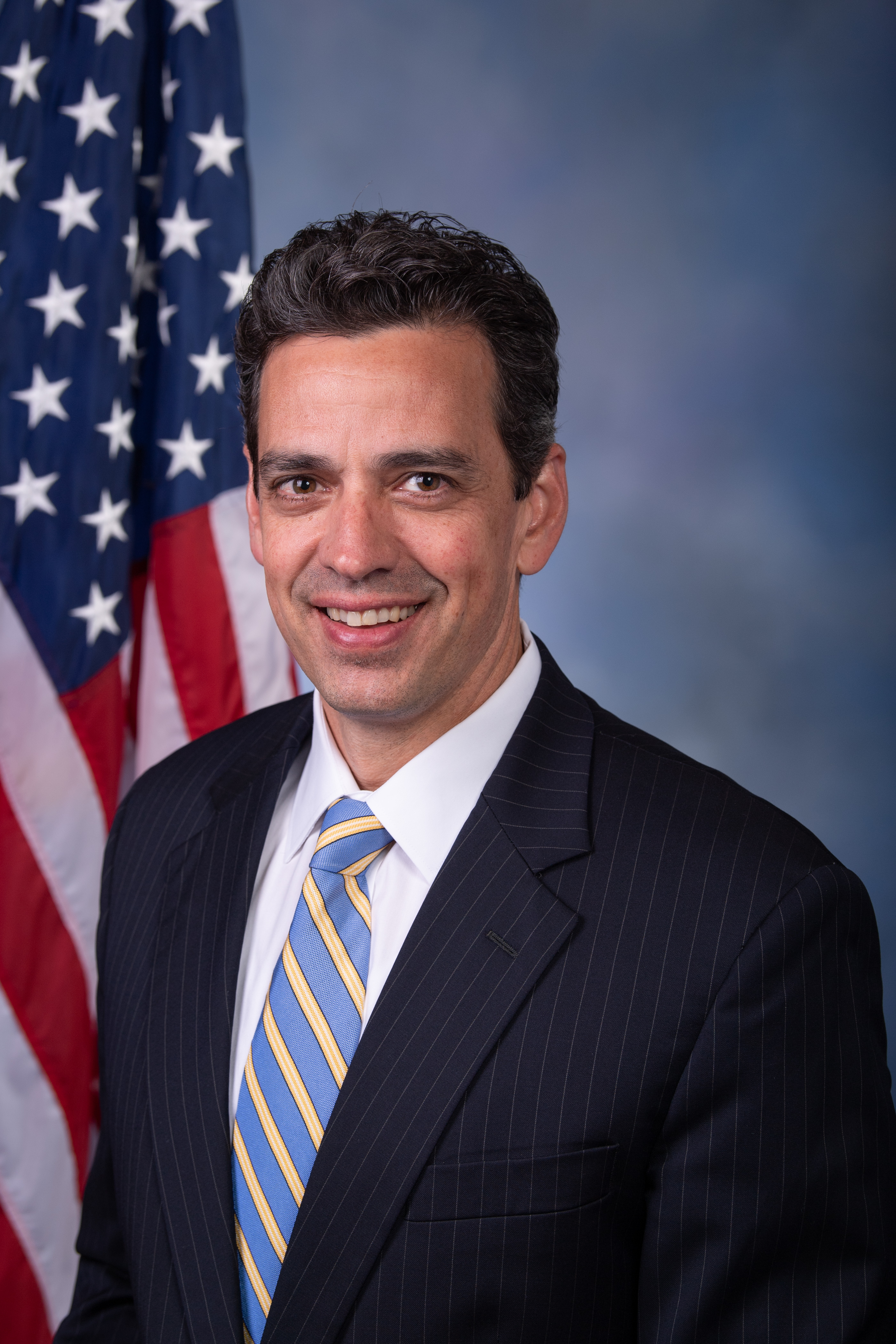
- Official portrait, c. 2019

Member of the U.S. House of Representatives from Georgia
- In office June 8, 2010 – October 4, 2020 (Note: Graves's official service begins on the date of the special election, while he was not sworn in until June 14, 2010.)
- Preceded by: Nathan Deal
- Succeeded by: Marjorie Taylor Greene
- Constituency: 9th district (2010–2013); 14th district (2013–2020)

Member of the Georgia House of Representatives
- In office January 3, 2003 – March 23, 2010
- Preceded by: Tom Shanahan
- Succeeded by: Rick Jasperse
- Constituency: 10th district (2003–2005); 12th district (2005–2010)

Personal details
- Born: John Thomas Graves Jr. February 3, 1970 (age 56) St. Petersburg, Florida, U.S.
- Party: Republican
- Spouse: Julie Howard
- Children: 3
- Education: University of Georgia (BBA)

John Thomas Graves Jr. (born February 3, 1970) is an American businessman and politician who served as the U.S. representative for Georgia's 14th congressional district from 2013 to 2020. Graves previously served one term as the U.S. representative for Georgia's 9th congressional district from 2010 to 2013, following his victory in a special election held to fill the seat left vacant by the resignation of Nathan Deal. Before his election to Congress, Graves served as a Republican member of the Georgia House of Representatives from 2003 to 2010.

Graves chose not to run for re-election in 2020, and resigned from the House of Representatives on October 4, 2020.

== Early life, education, and business career ==
Tom Graves was born in St. Petersburg, Florida, on February 3, 1970. He graduated from Cass High School in Cartersville, Georgia, where he played linebacker and offensive guard on the school football team. Graves earned his Bachelor of Business Administration from the University of Georgia. After college, he bought a landscaping company before working in real estate investment. Graves lives in Ranger, Georgia, southeast of Dalton.

In 2007, Graves and former Georgia Senate Majority Leader Chip Rogers took out a loan from Bartow County Bank to purchase and renovate a motel in Calhoun. In 2011, it was reported that Bartow County Bank had sued Rogers and Graves for defaulting on their $2.2 million bank loan. They countersued the bank in response. In August 2011, both parties dismissed their claims before going to hearing, settling the dispute out of court, and no details of the settlement were disclosed. Graves received criticism in The Atlanta Journal-Constitution on the grounds that the outcome of this business venture appeared to some individuals to undermine his stated commitment to fiscal responsibility.

== Georgia House of Representatives ==
=== Elections ===
Tom E. Shanahan retired as Representative to Georgia's 10th District in 2002, and Graves won as his successor with 60 percent of the vote. Graves later ran, unopposed, to serve as House Representative to Georgia's 12th district in 2004. He was re-elected, after two races in which he ran against primary challenger Bill Pickett in 2006 and unopposed in 2008.

=== Committee assignments ===
Graves served on the Transportation, Ways and Means committee and on the Health and Human services committee during his tenure in the Georgia House of Representatives. He also served as Vice Chairman on the Motor Vehicles committee.

=== Tenure ===
As a member of the Georgia House, Graves supported legislation to provide tax cuts and tax credits, including introducing the Jobs, Opportunity and Business Success (JOBS) Act of 2009.

Graves was named Legislator of the Year in 2009 by the American Legislative Exchange Council. Later that year, he was awarded the Guardian of Small Business award by the National Federation of Independent Business.

== U.S. House of Representatives ==
=== Elections ===
==== 2010 ====
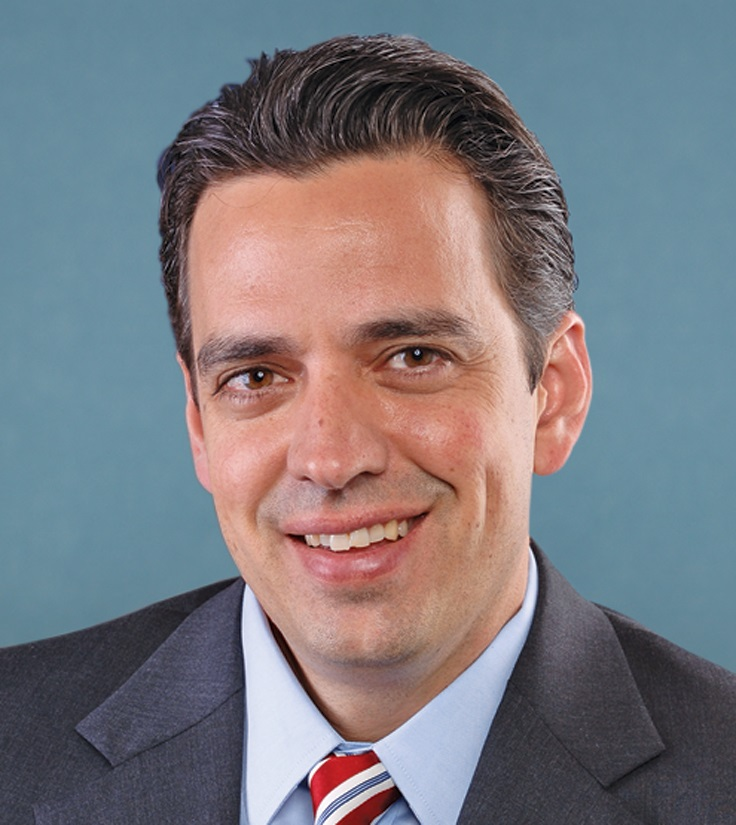
Graves during his first term in the 113th Congress

In May 2010, Graves won a special election to replace incumbent Representative Nathan Deal, who resigned to focus on his ultimately successful campaign for Governor. On June 8, 2010, Graves won the run-off for the special election against former state Senator Lee Hawkins. Graves then faced Hawkins two more times, in another primary election and run off before winning the November 2, 2010 general election unopposed. Upon his election, Graves joined the House Republican Whip team, which he later left in 2011. In January 2013, Graves rejoined the Whip team, and was a member as of 2020.

==== 2012 ====
Graves' home in Ranger, along with most of the northwestern portion of the old 9th, was drawn into the newly created 14th district during the 2012 census. He opted to run for reelection in the newly created district. The 14th was no less Republican than the 9th, and Graves won the November 6, 2012 election against Democratic challenger Daniel "Danny" Grant with 73 percent of the vote.

==== 2014 ====
Graves received 74 percent of the vote in the Republican primary against activist Kenneth Herron. He faced no general election opposition.

==== 2016 ====
Graves received 76 percent of the vote in the Republican primary against perennial candidate Allan Levene and activist Mickey Tuck. He faced no general election opposition.

Graves endorsed Senator Marco Rubio in the 2016 Republican Presidential Primary. In the same statement, Graves snubbed then-candidate Donald J. Trump: "I have trouble seeing how he lines up with the great tradition of Lincoln and Reagan, and I'm concerned that many of his statements run afoul of the Constitution, my values and my beliefs."

==== 2018 ====
Graves easily won re-election over his Democratic opponent Steven Lamar Foster, who had been arrested on DUI charges and said he "hated this county" during his arrest.

==== 2020 ====
On December 5, 2019, Graves announced that he would not run for re-election in 2020. He resigned from his seat early, on October 4, 2020.

=== Tenure ===
Graves is anti-abortion and voted in 2011 to limit funding to Planned Parenthood. He stated that he opposes abortion "without exception", including when the mother's life is at stake. In 2013, Graves voted in support of a bill which allowed abortions after 20 weeks post-fertilization if a mother's life is endangered, or if conception occurred through rape or incest. Graves did not receive an endorsement from the Georgia Right to Life PAC in the 2016 primary.

Graves was endorsed by the Atlanta Tea Party in 2010. He authored the Defund Obamacare Act in 2010 and reintroduced the bill in the 112th and 113th Congress.

Conservative Blogger Erick Erickson stated in 2014 that Graves has now become a "Judas goat" leading conservatives to the political slaughterhouse: "Graves's rapid support for McCarthy can only be seen as opportunistic," Erickson wrote, adding: "The conservative love affair with Graves was already waning. It is time to just end it. Let's see what he gets for himself by trading the veneer of conservatism."

Graves co-sponsored a balanced-budget amendment in both the 112th and 113th Congresses and supported the Cut, Cap and Balance Act of 2011, which aimed to reduce federal spending and establish caps in future spending. The same year, Graves introduced the HOME Act to allow Americans to make withdrawals from their retirement accounts to pay timely mortgage payments in 2011. He also voted against removing US troops from Afghanistan in March 2011. Graves introduced the Transportation Empowerment Act (TEA) in 2011, meant to lower the federal gas tax to 3.7 cents per gallon and transfer nearly all funding authority to U.S. states over a period of five years. Graves voted in favor of the Water Resources Reform and Development Act in 2013, which funded the Savannah Harbor Expansion Project in its expansion of the Savannah Harbor shipping channel from a depth of −42 feet to −47 feet. He also authored the Email Privacy Act with Representatives Kevin Yoder and Jared Polis. Graves led the national movement to defund the Patient Protection and Affordable Care Act ("Obamacare") in 2013.

=== Committee assignments ===
Graves was a member of the United States House Committee on Appropriations. In 2014, he was selected to serve as chairman of the Subcommittee on the Legislative Branch for the 114th Congress. His membership also included the subcommittees on Defense and Financial Services and General Government. He was chairman of the new Select Committee on the Modernization of Congress.

=== Caucus memberships ===
Graves was a member of the House Congressional Chicken Caucus, the House General Aviation Caucus, the Joint Congressional Sportsmen's Caucus, the House Congressional Balanced Budget Amendment Caucus, the House Republican Study Committee and the House Congressional Diabetes Caucus.

== Political positions ==
=== Economic issues ===
==== Tax reform ====
Graves supports tax reform and voted in favor of the Tax Cuts and Jobs Act of 2017. He called the act "a Christmas present for every American family and business", and believes "Americans will start taking home more of their hard-earned money as soon as February."

=== Barack Obama ===
In 2016, Graves called President Barack Obama a "dictator" and said that Obama "exceeded his authority" regarding gun laws.

=== Social issues ===
==== Abortion ====
Graves supports banning federal health coverage and any federal funds from funding abortions, including Affordable Care Act insurance coverage. He opposes abortions being used in sex- or race-selection. He opposes funding Planned Parenthood.

==== Cannabis ====
Graves has a "B" rating from NORML for his voting history regarding cannabis-related legislation.

=== Hacking ===
Graves introduced the Active Cyber Defense Certainty Act "to provide a defense to prosecution for fraud and related activity in connection with computers for persons defending against unauthorized intrusions into their computers, and for other purposes".

== After Congress ==
After leaving office, he became involved in political reform efforts, including joining nine other former members of Congress to co-author a 2021 opinion editorial advocating reforms of Congress.

== Personal life ==
Graves and his wife Julie, a schoolteacher, have three children together. They are active members of Belmont Baptist Church in Calhoun, Georgia.

U.S. House of Representatives
Preceded by Nathan Deal	Member of the U.S. House of Representatives from Georgia's 9th congressional district 2010–2013	Succeeded by Doug Collins
New constituency	Member of the U.S. House of Representatives from Georgia's 14th congressional district 2013–2020	Succeeded by Marjorie Taylor Greene
New office	Ranking Member of the House Modernization Committee; 2019–2020	Succeeded by William Timmons
U.S. order of precedence (ceremonial)
Preceded by John Barrow as Former U.S. Representative	Order of precedence of the United States as Former U.S. Representative	Succeeded by Rob Woodall as Former U.S. Representative
