= Lee Hawkins =

American politician (born 1950)

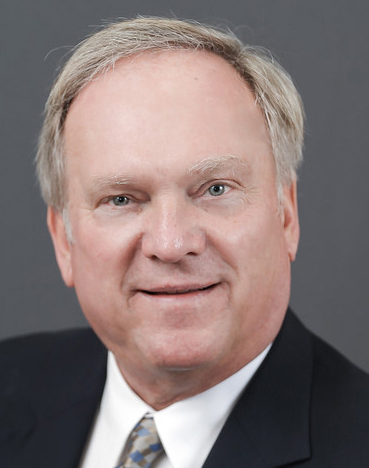
- Official portrait

Member of the Georgia House of Representatives from the 27th district
- Incumbent
- Assumed office January 14, 2013
- Preceded by: Doug Collins

Member of the Georgia State Senate from the 49th district
- In office January 8, 2007 – March 23, 2010
- Preceded by: Casey Cagle
- Succeeded by: Butch Miller

Personal details
- Born: B. Lee Hawkins; August 22, 1950 (age 75)
- Party: Republican

B. Lee Hawkins (born August 22, 1950) is an American politician from Gainesville, Georgia. He is a Republican. He is a member of the Georgia House of Representatives representing the 27th district, elected in 2012. The district covers most of north Hall County and parts of White and Forsyth counties. When he announced his candidacy, he described himself as having conservative values.

Previously he served two terms in the Georgia State Senate, from 2006 to 2010. During his second term he chaired the State and Local Government Operations committee.

In June 2010 he was one of two candidates, both Republicans, in a runoff special election for the 9th District seat in the U.S. House of Representatives. He lost to state representative Tom Graves, 58% to 42%. He also ran in the July primary and August runoff primary for the November general election for the same seat, losing the runoff to Graves 56% to 44%.

He was recognized as Legislator of the Year and various other recognitions by associations such as the Georgia Pharmacy Association, the Association of County Commissioners of Georgia, the Georgia Free Clinics, Johnson and Johnson Retirees, among others.

Hawkins has served as President of the Georgia Dental Association. He has been recognized as an Honorable Fellow and selected to the Pierre Fauchard Academy, the International College of Dentistry, and the American College of Dentists.
