= Political party strength in Georgia (U.S. state) =

The following table indicates the party of elected officials in the U.S. state of Georgia:

- Governor
- Lieutenant Governor
- Secretary of State
- Attorney General
- State School Superintendent
- Commissioner of Agriculture
- Commissioner of Insurance (formerly Comptroller General)
- Commissioner of Labor
- Treasurer (1877–1972)

The table also indicates the historical party composition in the:

- State Senate
- State House of Representatives
- State Public Service Commission
- State delegation to the United States Senate
- State delegation to the United States House of Representatives

For years in which a presidential election was held, the table indicates which party's nominees received the state's electoral votes.

Darker shading indicates confirmed partisan affiliation or majority; lighter shading indicates likely, but unconfirmed, partisan affiliation or majority.

== 1775–1788 ==
| Year | Executive offices | | | General Assembly |
| Year | Governor | Sec. of State | Atty. Gen. | General Assembly |
|---|---|---|---|---|
| 1775 | William Ewen (NP/W) (Note: President of Council of Safety.) (Note: Not a formal political party, and not to be confused with the 19th-century Whig Party.) | No such office | No such office | [?] |
| 1775 | George Walton (NP/W) | No such office | No such office | [?] |
| 1776 | George Walton (NP/W) | No such office | Williams Stephens | [?] |
| 1776 | William Ewen (NP/W) | No such office | Williams Stephens | [?] |
| 1776 | Archibald Bulloch (NP/W) (Note: President of Georgia.) (Note: Died in office.) | No such office | Williams Stephens | [?] |
| 1777 | Archibald Bulloch (NP/W) | John Milton (F) | Williams Stephens | [?] |
| 1777 | Button Gwinnett (NP/W) (Note: Died in office; after losing his bid for re-election, Gwinnett was wounded in a duel with Lachlan McIntosh on May 6, 1777 and died of his wounds two days later.) | John Milton (F) | Williams Stephens | [?] |
| 1777 | John A. Treutlen (NP/W) | John Milton (F) | Williams Stephens | [?] |
| 1778 | John Houstoun (NP/W) | John Milton (F) | Williams Stephens | [?] |
| 1779 | William Glascock (NP/W) (Note: President of Executive Council.) | John Milton (F) | Williams Stephens | [?] |
| 1779 | Seth John Cuthbert (NP/W) (Note: Temporary governor.) (Note: President of Supreme Executive Council.) | John Milton (F) | Williams Stephens | [?] |
| 1779 | John Wereat (NP/W) | John Milton (F) | Williams Stephens | [?] |
| 1779 | George Walton (NP/W) | John Milton (F) | Williams Stephens | [?] |
| 1780 | Richard Howly (NP/W) | John Milton (F) | John Milledge | [?] |
| 1780 | Humphrey Wells (NP/W) (Note: Resigned in favor of Stephen Heard.) | John Milton (F) | John Milledge | [?] |
| 1780 | Stephen Heard (NP/W) | John Milton (F) | John Milledge | [?] |
| 1780 | Myrick Davies (NP/W) | John Milton (F) | John Milledge | [?] |
| 1781 | Myrick Davies (NP/W) | John Milton (F) | Samuel Stirk | [?] |
| 1781 | Nathan Brownson (NP) | John Milton (F) | Samuel Stirk | [?] |
| 1782 | John Martin (NP) | John Milton (F) | Samuel Stirk | [?] |
| 1783 | Lyman Hall (NP) | John Milton (F) | Samuel Stirk | [?] |
| 1784 | John Houstoun (NP) | John Milton (F) | Samuel Stirk | [?] |
| 1785 | Samuel Elbert (NP) | John Milton (F) | Nathaniel Pendleton | [?] |
| 1786 | Edward Telfair (NP) | John Milton (F) | Nathaniel Pendleton | [?] |
| 1787 | George Mathews (NP) | John Milton (F) | Matthew Hall McAllister | [?] |
| 1788 | George Handley (NP) | John Milton (F) | Matthew Hall McAllister | [?] |

== 1789–1876 ==
| Year | Executive offices | | | General Assembly | | United States Congress | | | Electoral votes |
| Year | Governor | Sec. of State | Atty. Gen. | State Senate | State House | U.S. Senator (Class II) | U.S. Senator (Class III) | U.S. House | Electoral votes |
|---|---|---|---|---|---|---|---|---|---|
| 1789 | George Walton (DR) | John Milton (F) | Matthew Hall McAllister | [?] | | William Few (AA) | James Gunn (AA) | 3AA | George Washington (I) ✓ |
| 1790 | George Walton (DR) | John Milton (F) | Matthew Hall McAllister | [?] | | William Few (AA) | James Gunn (AA) | 3AA | George Washington (I) ✓ |
| 1791 | Edward Telfair (DR) | John Milton (F) | Matthew Hall McAllister | [?] | | William Few (AA) | James Gunn (AA) | 3AA | George Washington (I) ✓ |
| 1792 | Edward Telfair (DR) | John Milton (F) | George Walker | [?] | | William Few (AA) | James Gunn (AA) | 3AA | George Washington (I) ✓ |
| 1793 | Edward Telfair (DR) | John Milton (F) | George Walker | [?] | | James Jackson (AA) | James Gunn (AA) | 2AA | George Washington (I) ✓ |
| 1794 | George Mathews (DR) | John Milton (F) | George Walker | [?] | | James Jackson (AA) | James Gunn (AA) | 2AA | George Washington (I) ✓ |
| 1795 | George Mathews (DR) | John Milton (F) | George Walker | [?] | | James Jackson (DR) | James Gunn (F) | 2DR | George Washington (I) ✓ |
| 1796 | Jared Irwin (DR) | John Milton (F) | David Brydie Mitchell (DR) | [?] | | George Walton (F) | James Gunn (F) | 2DR | Thomas Jefferson (DR) ✗ |
| 1797 | Jared Irwin (DR) | John Milton (F) | David Brydie Mitchell (DR) | [?] | | Josiah Tattnall (DR) | James Gunn (F) | 2DR | Thomas Jefferson (DR) ✗ |
| 1798 | James Jackson (DR-J) (Note: Resigned to take elected seat in the United States Senate.) | John Milton (F) | David Brydie Mitchell (DR) | [?] | | Josiah Tattnall (DR) | James Gunn (F) | 2DR | Thomas Jefferson (DR) ✗ |
| 1799 | James Jackson (DR-J) | Horatio Marbury | David Brydie Mitchell (DR) | [?] | | Abraham Baldwin (DR) | James Gunn (F) | 2F | Thomas Jefferson (DR) ✗ |
| 1800 | James Jackson (DR-J) | Horatio Marbury | David Brydie Mitchell (DR) | [?] | | Abraham Baldwin (DR) | James Gunn (F) | 2F | Thomas Jefferson/ Aaron Burr (DR) ✓ |
| 1801 | James Jackson (DR-J) | Horatio Marbury | David Brydie Mitchell (DR) | [?] | | Abraham Baldwin (DR) | James Jackson (DR) | 2DR | Thomas Jefferson/ Aaron Burr (DR) ✓ |
| 1801 | David Emanuel (DR-J) (Note: As president of the state Senate, filled unexpired term.) | Horatio Marbury | David Brydie Mitchell (DR) | [?] | | Abraham Baldwin (DR) | James Jackson (DR) | 2DR | Thomas Jefferson/ Aaron Burr (DR) ✓ |
| 1802 | Josiah Tattnall (DR-J) (Note: Resigned due to declining health.) | Horatio Marbury | David Brydie Mitchell (DR) | [?] | | Abraham Baldwin (DR) | James Jackson (DR) | 2DR | Thomas Jefferson/ Aaron Burr (DR) ✓ |
| 1802 | John Milledge (DR-J) | Horatio Marbury | David Brydie Mitchell (DR) | [?] | | Abraham Baldwin (DR) | James Jackson (DR) | 2DR | Thomas Jefferson/ Aaron Burr (DR) ✓ |
| 1803 | John Milledge (DR-J) | Horatio Marbury | David Brydie Mitchell (DR) | [?] | | Abraham Baldwin (DR) | James Jackson (DR) | 4DR | Thomas Jefferson/ Aaron Burr (DR) ✓ |
| 1804 | John Milledge (DR-J) | Horatio Marbury | David Brydie Mitchell (DR) | [?] | | Abraham Baldwin (DR) | James Jackson (DR) | 4DR | Thomas Jefferson/ George Clinton (DR) ✓ |
| 1805 | John Milledge (DR-J) | Horatio Marbury | David Brydie Mitchell (DR) | [?] | | Abraham Baldwin (DR) | James Jackson (DR) | 4DR | Thomas Jefferson/ George Clinton (DR) ✓ |
| 1806 | John Milledge (DR-J) | Horatio Marbury | David Brydie Mitchell (DR) | [?] | | Abraham Baldwin (DR) | John Milledge (DR) | 4DR | Thomas Jefferson/ George Clinton (DR) ✓ |
| 1806 | Jared Irwin (DR-J) | Horatio Marbury | David Brydie Mitchell (DR) | [?] | | Abraham Baldwin (DR) | John Milledge (DR) | 4DR | Thomas Jefferson/ George Clinton (DR) ✓ |
| 1807 | Jared Irwin (DR-J) | Horatio Marbury | Robert Walker | [?] | | George Jones (DR) | John Milledge (DR) | 4DR | Thomas Jefferson/ George Clinton (DR) ✓ |
| 1808 | Jared Irwin (DR-J) | Horatio Marbury | John Hamil | [?] | | William H. Crawford (DR) | John Milledge (DR) | 4DR | James Madison/ George Clinton (DR) ✓ |
| 1809 | Jared Irwin (DR-J) | Horatio Marbury | John Forsyth (DR) | [?] | | William H. Crawford (DR) | John Milledge (DR) | 4DR | James Madison/ George Clinton (DR) ✓ |
| 1810 | David Brydie Mitchell (DR-J) | Horatio Marbury | John Forsyth (DR) | [?] | | William H. Crawford (DR) | Charles Tait (DR) | 4DR | James Madison/ George Clinton (DR) ✓ |
| 1811 | David Brydie Mitchell (DR-J) | Abner Hammond | Alexander M. Allen | [?] | | William H. Crawford (DR) | Charles Tait (DR) | 4DR | James Madison/ George Clinton (DR) ✓ |
| 1812 | David Brydie Mitchell (DR-J) | Abner Hammond | Richard H. Wilde (DR) | [?] | | William H. Crawford (DR) | Charles Tait (DR) | 4DR | James Madison/ Elbridge Gerry (DR) ✓ |
| 1813 | David Brydie Mitchell (DR-J) | Abner Hammond | Alexander M. Allen | [?] | | William B. Bulloch (DR) | Charles Tait (DR) | 6DR | James Madison/ Elbridge Gerry (DR) ✓ |
| 1814 | Peter Early (DR-J) | Abner Hammond | Alexander M. Allen | [?] | | William W. Bibb (DR) | Charles Tait (DR) | 6DR | James Madison/ Elbridge Gerry (DR) ✓ |
| 1815 | Peter Early (DR-J) | Abner Hammond | Alexander M. Allen | [?] | | William W. Bibb (DR) | Charles Tait (DR) | 6DR | James Madison/ Elbridge Gerry (DR) ✓ |
| 1816 | David Brydie Mitchell (DR-J) (Note: Resigned to become agent to the Creek people.) | Abner Hammond | Roger Lawson Gamble | [?] | | William W. Bibb (DR) | Charles Tait (DR) | 6DR | James Monroe/ Daniel D. Tompkins (DR) ✓ |
| 1817 | David Brydie Mitchell (DR-J) | Abner Hammond | Roger Lawson Gamble | [?] | | George Troup (DR) | Charles Tait (DR) | 6DR | James Monroe/ Daniel D. Tompkins (DR) ✓ |
| 1817 | William Rabun (DR-T) (Note: The Troup party was essentially the continuation of the Jackson faction (followers of James Jackson).) | Abner Hammond | Roger Lawson Gamble | [?] | | George Troup (DR) | Charles Tait (DR) | 6DR | James Monroe/ Daniel D. Tompkins (DR) ✓ |
| 1818 | William Rabun (DR-T) | Abner Hammond | Roger Lawson Gamble | [?] | | George Troup (DR) | Charles Tait (DR) | 6DR | James Monroe/ Daniel D. Tompkins (DR) ✓ |
| 1819 | William Rabun (DR-T) | Abner Hammond | Roger Lawson Gamble | [?] | | John Forsyth (DR) | John Elliott (DR) | 6DR | James Monroe/ Daniel D. Tompkins (DR) ✓ |
| 1819 | Matthew Talbot (DR-C) | Abner Hammond | Roger Lawson Gamble | [?] | | vacant | John Elliott (DR) | 6DR | James Monroe/ Daniel D. Tompkins (DR) ✓ |
| 1820 | John Clark (DR-C) | Abner Hammond | Roger Lawson Gamble | [?] | | Freeman Walker (DR) | John Elliott (DR) | 6DR | James Monroe/ Daniel D. Tompkins (DR) ✓ |
| 1821 | John Clark (DR-C) | Abner Hammond | Roger Lawson Gamble | [?] | | Freeman Walker (DR) | John Elliott (DR) | 6DR | James Monroe/ Daniel D. Tompkins (DR) ✓ |
| 1822 | John Clark (DR-C) | Abner Hammond | Thomas F. Wells | [?] | | Nicholas Ware (DR) | John Elliott (DR) | 6DR | James Monroe/ Daniel D. Tompkins (DR) ✓ |
| 1823 | John Clark (DR-C) | Everard Hamilton | Thomas F. Wells | [?] | | Nicholas Ware (DR) | John Elliott (DR) | 7DR | James Monroe/ Daniel D. Tompkins (DR) ✓ |
| 1824 | George Troup (DR-T) | Everard Hamilton | Thomas F. Wells | [?] | | Thomas W. Cobb (DR) | John Elliott (DR) | 7DR | William H. Crawford/ Nathaniel Macon (DR) ✗ |
| 1825 | George Troup (DR-T) | Everard Hamilton | Thomas F. Wells | [?] | | Thomas W. Cobb (J) | John M. Berrien (J) | 7J | William H. Crawford/ Nathaniel Macon (DR) ✗ |
| 1826 | George Troup (DR-T) | Everard Hamilton | Thomas F. Wells | [?] | | Thomas W. Cobb (J) | John M. Berrien (J) | 7J | William H. Crawford/ Nathaniel Macon (DR) ✗ |
| 1827 | George Troup (DR-T) | Everard Hamilton | George W. Crawford (W) | [?] | | Thomas W. Cobb (J) | John M. Berrien (J) | 7J | William H. Crawford/ Nathaniel Macon (DR) ✗ |
| 1828 | John Forsyth (DR-T) | Everard Hamilton | George W. Crawford (W) | [?] | | Oliver H. Prince (J) | John M. Berrien (J) | 7J | Andrew Jackson/ John C. Calhoun (D) ✓ |
| 1829 | John Forsyth (DR-T) | Everard Hamilton | George W. Crawford (W) | [?] | | George Troup (J) | vacant | 7J | Andrew Jackson/ John C. Calhoun (D) ✓ |
| 1830 | George R. Gilmer (DR-T) | Everard Hamilton | George W. Crawford (W) | [?] | | George Troup (J) | John Forsyth (J) | 7J | Andrew Jackson/ John C. Calhoun (D) ✓ |
| 1831 | George R. Gilmer (DR-T) | Everard Hamilton | Charles J. Jenkins (D) | [?] | | George Troup (J) | John Forsyth (J) | 7J | Andrew Jackson/ John C. Calhoun (D) ✓ |
| 1832 | Wilson Lumpkin (U) | Everard Hamilton | Charles J. Jenkins (D) | [?] | | George Troup (J) | John Forsyth (J) | 7J | Andrew Jackson/ Martin Van Buren (D) ✓ |
| 1833 | Wilson Lumpkin (U) | William A. Tennille | Charles J. Jenkins (D) | [?] | | George Troup (J) | John Forsyth (J) | 9J | Andrew Jackson/ Martin Van Buren (D) ✓ |
| 1834 | Wilson Lumpkin (U) | William A. Tennille | Ebenezer Starnes | [?] | | John Pendleton King (J) | vacant | 9J | Andrew Jackson/ Martin Van Buren (D) ✓ |
| 1835 | Wilson Lumpkin (U) | William A. Tennille | Ebenezer Starnes | [?] | | John Pendleton King (J) | Alfred Cuthbert (J) | 9J | Andrew Jackson/ Martin Van Buren (D) ✓ |
| 1836 | William Schley (U) | William A. Tennille | Ebenezer Starnes | 54U, 31SR | 102U, 68SR | John Pendleton King (J) | Alfred Cuthbert (J) | 7J, 2NR | Hugh Lawson White/ John Tyler (W) ✗ |
| 1837 | William Schley (U) | William A. Tennille | Ebenezer Starnes | [?] | [?] | John Pendleton King (D) | Alfred Cuthbert (D) | 8D, 1W | Hugh Lawson White/ John Tyler (W) ✗ |
| 1838 | George R. Gilmer (SR) | William A. Tennille | Ebenezer Starnes | 50SR, 42U | 103SR, 88U | Wilson Lumpkin (D) | Alfred Cuthbert (D) | 8D, 1W | Hugh Lawson White/ John Tyler (W) ✗ |
| 1839 | George R. Gilmer (SR) | William A. Tennille | Ebenezer Starnes | 50U, 37SR | 96U, 76SR | Wilson Lumpkin (D) | Alfred Cuthbert (D) | 9W | Hugh Lawson White/ John Tyler (W) ✗ |
| 1840 | Charles James McDonald (U) | William A. Tennille | James Gardner | 46SR, 28U, 1 tie | 102U, 94SR, 1? | Wilson Lumpkin (D) | Alfred Cuthbert (D) | 9W | William Henry Harrison/ John Tyler (W) ✓ |
| 1841 | Charles James McDonald (U) | William A. Tennille | James Gardner | 48W, 44D | 118W, 88D | John M. Berrien (W) | Alfred Cuthbert (D) | 9W | William Henry Harrison/ John Tyler (W) ✓ |
| 1842 | Charles James McDonald (U) | William A. Tennille | James Gardner | 51D, 38W, 1 tie | 109D, 91W, 2 ties | John M. Berrien (W) | Alfred Cuthbert (D) | 6W, 3D | William Henry Harrison/ John Tyler (W) ✓ |
| 1843 | Charles James McDonald (U) | Nathan Crawford Barnett (D) | John J. R. Flournoy | 55D, 36W, 2 ties | 118D, 87W, 2 ties | John M. Berrien (W) | Walter T. Colquitt (D) | 8D | William Henry Harrison/ John Tyler (W) ✓ |
| 1844 | George W. Crawford (W) | Nathan Crawford Barnett (D) | John J. R. Flournoy | 49D, 43W, 1? | 124W, 81D | John M. Berrien (W) | Walter T. Colquitt (D) | 5D, 3W | James K. Polk/ George M. Dallas (D) ✓ |
| 1845 | George W. Crawford (W) | Nathan Crawford Barnett (D) | John J. R. Flournoy | 49D, 43W, 1? | 124W, 81D | vacant | Walter T. Colquitt (D) | 5D, 3W | James K. Polk/ George M. Dallas (D) ✓ |
| 1846 | George W. Crawford (W) | Nathan Crawford Barnett (D) | John J. R. Flournoy | 25D, 22W | 69D, 60W, 1 tie | John M. Berrien (W) | Walter T. Colquitt (D) | 5D, 3W | James K. Polk/ George M. Dallas (D) ✓ |
| 1847 | George W. Crawford (W) | Nathan Crawford Barnett (D) | Alpheus Colvard | 25D, 22W | 69D, 60W, 1 tie | John M. Berrien (W) | Walter T. Colquitt (D) | 4W, 4D | James K. Polk/ George M. Dallas (D) ✓ |
| 1848 | George W. Towns (D) | Nathan Crawford Barnett (D) | Alpheus Colvard | 25W, 21D, 1I | 68W, 62D | John M. Berrien (W) | Herschel V. Johnson (D) | 4W, 4D | Zachary Taylor/ Millard Fillmore (W) ✓ |
| 1849 | George W. Towns (D) | George Washington Harrison | Alpheus Colvard | 25W, 21D, 1I | 68W, 62D | John M. Berrien (W) | William C. Dawson (W) | 4W, 4D | Zachary Taylor/ Millard Fillmore (W) ✓ |
| 1850 | George W. Towns (D) | George Washington Harrison | Alpheus Colvard | 25D, 22W | 65W, 61D, 1 tie, 3? | John M. Berrien (W) | William C. Dawson (W) | 5D, 3W | Zachary Taylor/ Millard Fillmore (W) ✓ |
| 1851 | George W. Towns (D) | Nathan Crawford Barnett (D) | John Troup Shewmake | 25D, 22W | 65W, 61D, 1 tie, 3? | John M. Berrien (W) | William C. Dawson (W) | 4D, 2U, 2W | Zachary Taylor/ Millard Fillmore (W) ✓ |
| 1852 | Howell Cobb (CU) (Note: Not to be confused with the 1860s Constitutional Union Party, the Georgia Constitutional Union Party was a brief merger of Southern Unionist Democrats and Whigs during the early 1850s.) | Nathan Crawford Barnett (D) | John Troup Shewmake | 39U, 8SR | 104U, 29SR | Robert M. Charlton (D) | William C. Dawson (W) | 4D, 2U, 2W | Franklin Pierce/ William R. King (D) ✓ |
| 1853 | Howell Cobb (CU) | Elihu P. Watkins | John Troup Shewmake | 39U, 8SR | 104U, 29SR | Robert Toombs (D) | William C. Dawson (W) | 6D, 2W | Franklin Pierce/ William R. King (D) ✓ |
| 1854 | Herschel V. Johnson (D) | Elihu P. Watkins | John Troup Shewmake | 78D, 33KN | 92D, 55KN | Robert Toombs (D) | William C. Dawson (W) | 6D, 2W | Franklin Pierce/ William R. King (D) ✓ |
| 1855 | Herschel V. Johnson (D) | Elihu P. Watkins | William R. McLaws | 78D, 33KN | 92D, 55KN | Robert Toombs (D) | Alfred Iverson Sr. (D) | 5D, 2KN, 1W | Franklin Pierce/ William R. King (D) ✓ |
| 1856 | Herschel V. Johnson (D) | Elihu P. Watkins | William R. McLaws | 78D, 33KN | 92D, 55KN, 1ID | Robert Toombs (D) | Alfred Iverson Sr. (D) | 5D, 2KN, 1W | James Buchanan/ John C. Breckinridge (D) ✓ |
| 1857 | Herschel V. Johnson (D) | Elihu P. Watkins | William R. McLaws | 78D, 33KN | 92D, 55KN, 1ID | Robert Toombs (D) | Alfred Iverson Sr. (D) | 5D, 2KN, 1W | James Buchanan/ John C. Breckinridge (D) ✓ |
| 1858 | Joseph E. Brown (D) (Note: Resigned following the defeat of the Confederate States of America.) | Elihu P. Watkins | William R. McLaws | 86D, 32KN | 102D, 51KN, 1ID, 1I | Robert Toombs (D) | Alfred Iverson Sr. (D) | 5D, 2KN, 1W | James Buchanan/ John C. Breckinridge (D) ✓ |
| 1859 | Joseph E. Brown (D) | Elihu P. Watkins | Alpheus M. Rogers | 86D, 32KN | 102D, 51KN, 1ID, 1I | Robert Toombs (D) | Alfred Iverson Sr. (D) | 6D, 1A, 1O | James Buchanan/ John C. Breckinridge (D) ✓ |
| 1860 | Joseph E. Brown (D) | Elihu P. Watkins | Alpheus M. Rogers | 103D, 21O | 120D, 48O, 1ID, 1I | Robert Toombs (D) | Alfred Iverson Sr. (D) | 6D, 1A, 1O | John C. Breckinridge/ Joseph Lane (SD) ✗ |
| 1861 | Joseph E. Brown (D) | Nathan Crawford Barnett (D) | Winder P. Johnson | 103D, 21O | 120D, 48O, 1ID, 1I | American Civil War/ Reconstruction | | | John C. Breckinridge/ Joseph Lane (SD) ✗ |
| 1862 | Joseph E. Brown (D) | Nathan Crawford Barnett (D) | William Watts Montgomery | American Civil War/ Reconstruction | | American Civil War/ Reconstruction | | | John C. Breckinridge/ Joseph Lane (SD) ✗ |
| 1863 | Joseph E. Brown (D) | Nathan Crawford Barnett (D) | William Watts Montgomery | American Civil War/ Reconstruction | | American Civil War/ Reconstruction | | | John C. Breckinridge/ Joseph Lane (SD) ✗ |
| 1864 | Joseph E. Brown (D) | Nathan Crawford Barnett (D) | William Watts Montgomery | American Civil War/ Reconstruction | | American Civil War/ Reconstruction | | | American Civil War |
| 1865 | Joseph E. Brown (D) | Nathan Crawford Barnett (D) | William Watts Montgomery | American Civil War/ Reconstruction | | American Civil War/ Reconstruction | | | American Civil War |
| 1865 | James Johnson (D) (Note: Provisional governor appointed by President Andrew Johnson following American Civil War.) | Nathan Crawford Barnett (D) | George Barnes (D) | American Civil War/ Reconstruction | | American Civil War/ Reconstruction | | | American Civil War |
| 1866 | Charles J. Jenkins (D) (Note: Removed from office by the military because he refused to allow state funds to be used for a racially integrated state constitutional convention; the state was still under military occupation during Reconstruction.) | Nathan Crawford Barnett (D) | John Philpot; Curren Whitehead | American Civil War/ Reconstruction | | American Civil War/ Reconstruction | | | American Civil War |
| 1867 | Charles J. Jenkins (D) | Nathan Crawford Barnett (D) | John Philpot; Curren Whitehead | American Civil War/ Reconstruction | | American Civil War/ Reconstruction | | | American Civil War |
| 1868 | Thomas H. Ruger (M) (Note: Provisional governor appointed by General George Meade.) | Nathan Crawford Barnett (D) | John Philpot; Curren Whitehead | American Civil War/ Reconstruction | | vacant | vacant | 4R, 2D | Horatio Seymour/ Francis Preston Blair Jr. (D) ✗ |
| 1868 | Rufus Bullock (R) (Note: Resigned; fled the state to avoid impeachment; was arrested in 1876 and found not guilty of embezzlement.) | David G. Cotting (R) | Henry P. Farrow (R) | American Civil War/ Reconstruction | | vacant | vacant | 4R, 2D | Horatio Seymour/ Francis Preston Blair Jr. (D) ✗ |
| 1869 | Rufus Bullock (R) | David G. Cotting (R) | Henry P. Farrow (R) | 26R, 18D | 88D, 84R, 3? | vacant | vacant | vacant | Horatio Seymour/ Francis Preston Blair Jr. (D) ✗ |
| 1870 | Rufus Bullock (R) | David G. Cotting (R) | Henry P. Farrow (R) | 26R, 18D | 88D, 84R, 3? | vacant | vacant | 4D, 3R | Horatio Seymour/ Francis Preston Blair Jr. (D) ✗ |
| 1871 | Rufus Bullock (R) | David G. Cotting (R) | Henry P. Farrow (R) | 29D, 14R, 1I | 136D, 29R, 1I, 1? | Homer V. M. Miller (D) | Joshua Hill (R) | 4D, 3R | Horatio Seymour/ Francis Preston Blair Jr. (D) ✗ |
| 1871 | Benjamin F. Conley (R) | David G. Cotting (R) | Henry P. Farrow (R) | 29D, 14R, 1I | 136D, 29R, 1I, 1? | vacant | Joshua Hill (R) | 4D, 3R | Horatio Seymour/ Francis Preston Blair Jr. (D) ✗ |
| 1872 | James Milton Smith (D) | David G. Cotting (R) | Nathaniel J. Hammond (D) | 29D, 14R, 1I | 136D, 29R, 1I, 1? | Thomas M. Norwood (D) | Joshua Hill (R) | 5D, 2R | B. Gratz Brown (LR) ✗ (Note: Liberal Republican nominee Horace Greeley died before the Electoral College voted. 6 of Georgia's 11 votes went to Greeley's running mate Brown, while 3 went to Greeley and 2 went to Democratic Georgia Governor Charles J. Jenkins) |
| 1873 | James Milton Smith (D) | Nathan Crawford Barnett (D) | Nathaniel J. Hammond (D) | 40D, 4R | 161D, 14R | Thomas M. Norwood (D) | John B. Gordon (D) | 7D, 2R | B. Gratz Brown (LR) ✗ |
| 1874 | James Milton Smith (D) | Nathan Crawford Barnett (D) | Nathaniel J. Hammond (D) | 40D, 4R | 161D, 14R | Thomas M. Norwood (D) | John B. Gordon (D) | 6D, 3R | B. Gratz Brown (LR) ✗ |
| 1875 | James Milton Smith (D) | Nathan Crawford Barnett (D) | Nathaniel J. Hammond (D) | 43D, 1R | 168D, 7R | Thomas M. Norwood (D) | John B. Gordon (D) | 8D, 1I | B. Gratz Brown (LR) ✗ |
| 1876 | James Milton Smith (D) | Nathan Crawford Barnett (D) | Nathaniel J. Hammond (D) | 43D, 1R | 168D, 7R | Thomas M. Norwood (D) | John B. Gordon (D) | 8D, 1I | Tilden/ Hendricks (D) ✗ |

== 1877–1982 ==
| Year | Executive offices | | | | | | | | | General Assembly | | PSC | United States Congress | | | Electoral votes |
| Year | Governor | Lt. Governor | Sec. of State | Atty. Gen. | School Supt. | Comm. of Ag. | Comptroller | Comm. of Labor | Treasurer | State Senate | State House | PSC | U.S. Senator (Class II) | U.S. Senator (Class III) | U.S. House | Electoral votes |
|---|---|---|---|---|---|---|---|---|---|---|---|---|---|---|---|---|
| 1877 | Alfred H. Colquitt (D) | no such office (Note: Position of lieutenant governor created in 1945 and first elected in 1946.) | Nathan Crawford; Barnett (D) | Robert N. Ely (D) | (Note: Appointed by the governor.) | | W. L. Goldsmith (D) (Note: Resigned due to an ongoing impeachment trial for corruption.) | no such office (Note: The Georgia Department of Labor was created in 1937 and placed under the control of an elected commissioner.) | J.W. Renfroe | 40D, 3ID, 1R | 159D, 8R, 8I | no such office | Benjamin Harvey Hill (D) | John B. Gordon (D) | 8D, 1I | |
| 1878 | Alfred H. Colquitt (D) | no such office | Nathan Crawford; Barnett (D) | Robert N. Ely (D) | (Note: Appointed by the governor.) | | W. L. Goldsmith (D) | no such office | J.W. Renfroe | 40D, 3ID, 1R | 159D, 8R, 8I | no such office | Benjamin Harvey Hill (D) | John B. Gordon (D) | 8D, 1I | |
| 1879 | Alfred H. Colquitt (D) | no such office | Nathan Crawford; Barnett (D) | Robert N. Ely (D) | (Note: Appointed by the governor.) | | W. L. Goldsmith (D) | no such office | J.W. Renfroe | 44D | 171D, 4R | no such office | Benjamin Harvey Hill (D) | John B. Gordon (D) | 6D, 3I | |
| 1879 | Alfred H. Colquitt (D) | no such office | Nathan Crawford; Barnett (D) | Robert N. Ely (D) | (Note: Appointed by the governor.) | | William Ambrose Wright (D) (Note: Filled vacancy.) | no such office | J.W. Renfroe | 44D | 171D, 4R | no such office | Benjamin Harvey Hill (D) | John B. Gordon (D) | 6D, 3I | |
| 1880 | Alfred H. Colquitt (D) | no such office | Nathan Crawford; Barnett (D) | Clifford Anderson (D) | (Note: Appointed by the governor.) | | William Ambrose Wright (D) | no such office | J.W. Renfroe | 44D | 171D, 4R | | Benjamin Harvey Hill (D) | Joseph E. Brown (D) | 6D, 3I | Hancock/ English (D) ✗ |
| 1881 | Alfred H. Colquitt (D) | no such office | Nathan Crawford; Barnett (D) | Clifford Anderson (D) | (Note: Appointed by the governor.) | | William Ambrose Wright (D) | no such office | D. N. Speer | 43D, 1R | 165D, 10R | | Benjamin Harvey Hill (D) | Joseph E. Brown (D) | 8D, 1I | Hancock/ English (D) ✗ |
| 1882 | Alfred H. Colquitt (D) | no such office | Nathan Crawford; Barnett (D) | Clifford Anderson (D) | (Note: Appointed by the governor.) | | William Ambrose Wright (D) | no such office | D. N. Speer | 43D, 1R | 165D, 10R | | Pope Barrow (D) | Joseph E. Brown (D) | 8D, 1I | Hancock/ English (D) ✗ |
| 1883 | Alexander H. Stephens (D) | no such office | Nathan Crawford; Barnett (D) | Clifford Anderson (D) | (Note: Appointed by the governor.) | | William Ambrose Wright (D) | no such office | D. N. Speer | 44D | 167D, 5I, 2R, 1Proh | | Alfred H. Colquitt (D) | Joseph E. Brown (D) | 10D | Hancock/ English (D) ✗ |
| 1883 | James S. Boynton (D) | no such office | Nathan Crawford; Barnett (D) | Clifford Anderson (D) | (Note: Appointed by the governor.) | | William Ambrose Wright (D) | no such office | D. N. Speer | 44D | 167D, 5I, 2R, 1Proh | | Alfred H. Colquitt (D) | Joseph E. Brown (D) | 10D | Hancock/ English (D) ✗ |
| 1883 | Henry Dickerson McDaniel (D) | no such office | Nathan Crawford; Barnett (D) | Clifford Anderson (D) | (Note: Appointed by the governor.) | | William Ambrose Wright (D) | no such office | D. N. Speer | 44D | 167D, 5I, 2R, 1Proh | | Alfred H. Colquitt (D) | Joseph E. Brown (D) | 10D | Hancock/ English (D) ✗ |
| 1884 | Henry Dickerson McDaniel (D) | no such office | Nathan Crawford; Barnett (D) | Clifford Anderson (D) | (Note: Appointed by the governor.) | | William Ambrose Wright (D) | no such office | D. N. Speer | 44D | 167D, 5I, 2R, 1Proh | | Alfred H. Colquitt (D) | Joseph E. Brown (D) | 10D | Cleveland/ Hendricks (D) ✓ |
| 1885 | Henry Dickerson McDaniel (D) | no such office | Nathan Crawford; Barnett (D) | Clifford Anderson (D) | (Note: Appointed by the governor.) | | William Ambrose Wright (D) | no such office | Robert Ulla Hardeman | 44D | 169D, 6R | | Alfred H. Colquitt (D) | Joseph E. Brown (D) | 10D | Cleveland/ Hendricks (D) ✓ |
| 1886 | Henry Dickerson McDaniel (D) | no such office | Nathan Crawford; Barnett (D) | Clifford Anderson (D) | (Note: Appointed by the governor.) | | William Ambrose Wright (D) | no such office | Robert Ulla Hardeman | 44D | 169D, 6R | | Alfred H. Colquitt (D) | Joseph E. Brown (D) | 10D | Cleveland/ Hendricks (D) ✓ |
| 1887 | John B. Gordon (D) | no such office | Nathan Crawford; Barnett (D) | Clifford Anderson (D) | (Note: Appointed by the governor.) | | William Ambrose Wright (D) | no such office | Robert Ulla Hardeman | 39D, 2R, 2I, 1Lab | 150D, 10R, 10I, 5Lab | | Alfred H. Colquitt (D) | Joseph E. Brown (D) | 10D | Cleveland/ Hendricks (D) ✓ |
| 1888 | John B. Gordon (D) | no such office | Nathan Crawford; Barnett (D) | Clifford Anderson (D) | (Note: Appointed by the governor.) | | William Ambrose Wright (D) | no such office | Robert Ulla Hardeman | 39D, 2R, 2I, 1Lab | 150D, 10R, 10I, 5Lab | | Alfred H. Colquitt (D) | Joseph E. Brown (D) | 10D | Cleveland/ Thurman (D) ✗ |
| 1889 | John B. Gordon (D) | no such office | Nathan Crawford; Barnett (D) | Clifford Anderson (D) | (Note: Appointed by the governor.) | | William Ambrose Wright (D) | no such office | Robert Ulla Hardeman | 43D, 1R | 172D, 3R | | Alfred H. Colquitt (D) | Joseph E. Brown (D) | 10D | Cleveland/ Thurman (D) ✗ |
| 1890 | John B. Gordon (D) | no such office | Nathan Crawford; Barnett (D) | George N. Lester (D) | (Note: Appointed by the governor.) | | William Ambrose Wright (D) | no such office | Robert Ulla Hardeman | 43D, 1R | 172D, 3R | | Alfred H. Colquitt (D) | Joseph E. Brown (D) | 10D | Cleveland/ Thurman (D) ✗ |
| 1890 | John B. Gordon (D) | no such office | Philip Cook (D) | George N. Lester (D) | (Note: Appointed by the governor.) | | William Ambrose Wright (D) | no such office | Robert Ulla Hardeman | 43D, 1R | 172D, 3R | | Alfred H. Colquitt (D) | Joseph E. Brown (D) | 10D | Cleveland/ Thurman (D) ✗ |
| 1891 | William J. Northen (D) | no such office | Philip Cook (D) | W. A. Little (D) | (Note: Appointed by the governor.) | Robert Taylor Nesbitt (D) | William Ambrose Wright (D) | no such office | Robert Ulla Hardeman | 44D | 171D, 4R | | Alfred H. Colquitt (D) | John B. Gordon (D) | 9D, 1Pop | Cleveland/ Thurman (D) ✗ |
| 1892 | William J. Northen (D) | no such office | Philip Cook (D) | J. M. Terrell (D) | (Note: Appointed by the governor.) | Robert Taylor Nesbitt (D) | William Ambrose Wright (D) | no such office | Robert Ulla Hardeman | 44D | 171D, 4R | | Alfred H. Colquitt (D) | John B. Gordon (D) | 9D, 1Pop | Cleveland/ Stevenson (D) ✓ |
| 1893 | William J. Northen (D) | no such office | Philip Cook (D) | J. M. Terrell (D) | (Note: Appointed by the governor.) | Robert Taylor Nesbitt (D) | William Ambrose Wright (D) | no such office | Robert Ulla Hardeman | 43D, 1Pop | 159D, 11Pop, 4R, 1? | | Alfred H. Colquitt (D) | John B. Gordon (D) | 11D | Cleveland/ Stevenson (D) ✓ |
| 1894 | William J. Northen (D) | no such office | Philip Cook (D) | J. M. Terrell (D) | (Note: Appointed by the governor.) | Robert Taylor Nesbitt (D) | William Ambrose Wright (D) | no such office | Robert Ulla Hardeman | 43D, 1Pop | 159D, 11Pop, 4R, 1? | | Patrick Walsh (D) | John B. Gordon (D) | 11D | Cleveland/ Stevenson (D) ✓ |
| 1894 | William J. Northen (D) | no such office | Allen D. Candler (D) | J. M. Terrell (D) | (Note: Appointed by the governor.) | Robert Taylor Nesbitt (D) | William Ambrose Wright (D) | no such office | Robert Ulla Hardeman | 43D, 1Pop | 159D, 11Pop, 4R, 1? | | Patrick Walsh (D) | John B. Gordon (D) | 11D | Cleveland/ Stevenson (D) ✓ |
| 1895 | William Yates Atkinson (D) | no such office | Allen D. Candler (D) | J. M. Terrell (D) | Gustavus Richard Glenn (D) (Note: Initially appointed, then later elected as the first elected Georgia state school commissioner.) | Robert Taylor Nesbitt (D) | William Ambrose Wright (D) | no such office | Robert Ulla Hardeman | 38D, 5Pop, 1R | 126D, 47Pop, 2R | | Augustus O. Bacon (D) | John B. Gordon (D) | 11D | Cleveland/ Stevenson (D) ✓ |
| 1896 | William Yates Atkinson (D) | no such office | Allen D. Candler (D) | J. M. Terrell (D) | Gustavus Richard Glenn (D) | Robert Taylor Nesbitt (D) | William Ambrose Wright (D) | no such office | Robert Ulla Hardeman | 38D, 5Pop, 1R | 126D, 47Pop, 2R | | Augustus O. Bacon (D) | John B. Gordon (D) | 11D | Bryan/ Sewall (D) ✗ |
| 1897 | William Yates Atkinson (D) | no such office | Allen D. Candler (D) | J. M. Terrell (D) | Gustavus Richard Glenn (D) | Robert Taylor Nesbitt (D) | William Ambrose Wright (D) | no such office | W. J. Speer | 37D, 6Pop, 1R | 142D, 30Pop, 3R | | Augustus O. Bacon (D) | Alexander S. Clay (D) | 11D | Bryan/ Sewall (D) ✗ |
| 1898 | William Yates Atkinson (D) | no such office | William C. Clifton (D) | J. M. Terrell (D) | Gustavus Richard Glenn (D) | Robert Taylor Nesbitt (D) | William Ambrose Wright (D) | no such office | W. J. Speer | 37D, 6Pop, 1R | 142D, 30Pop, 3R | | Augustus O. Bacon (D) | Alexander S. Clay (D) | 11D | Bryan/ Sewall (D) ✗ |
| 1898 | William Yates Atkinson (D) | no such office | Philip Cook, Jr. (D) | J. M. Terrell (D) | Gustavus Richard Glenn (D) | Robert Taylor Nesbitt (D) | William Ambrose Wright (D) | no such office | W. J. Speer | 37D, 6Pop, 1R | 142D, 30Pop, 3R | | Augustus O. Bacon (D) | Alexander S. Clay (D) | 11D | Bryan/ Sewall (D) ✗ |
| 1899 | Allen D. Candler (D) | no such office | Philip Cook, Jr. (D) | J. M. Terrell (D) | Gustavus Richard Glenn (D) | O. B. Stevens (D) (Note: Resigned to take a position on the Georgia Railroad Commission.) | William Ambrose Wright (D) | no such office | W. J. Speer | 43D, 1R | 170D, 5Pop | | Augustus O. Bacon (D) | Alexander S. Clay (D) | 11D | Bryan/ Sewall (D) ✗ |
| 1900 | Allen D. Candler (D) | no such office | Philip Cook, Jr. (D) | J. M. Terrell (D) | Gustavus Richard Glenn (D) | O. B. Stevens (D) | William Ambrose Wright (D) | no such office | W. J. Speer | 43D, 1R | 170D, 5Pop | | Augustus O. Bacon (D) | Alexander S. Clay (D) | 11D | Bryan/ Stevenson (D) ✗ |
| 1901 | Allen D. Candler (D) | no such office | Philip Cook, Jr. (D) | J. M. Terrell (D) | Gustavus Richard Glenn (D) | O. B. Stevens (D) | William Ambrose Wright (D) | no such office | R. E. Park | 43D, 1R | 166D, 9P | | Augustus O. Bacon (D) | Alexander S. Clay (D) | 11D | Bryan/ Stevenson (D) ✗ |
| 1902 | Allen D. Candler (D) | no such office | Philip Cook, Jr. (D) | Boykin Wright (D) | Gustavus Richard Glenn (D) | O. B. Stevens (D) | William Ambrose Wright (D) | no such office | R. E. Park | 43D, 1R | 166D, 9P | | Augustus O. Bacon (D) | Alexander S. Clay (D) | 11D | Bryan/ Stevenson (D) ✗ |
| 1903 | Joseph M. Terrell (D) | no such office | Philip Cook, Jr. (D) | John C. Hart (D) | William B. Merritt (D) | O. B. Stevens (D) | William Ambrose Wright (D) | no such office | R. E. Park | 40D, 2R, 2Pop | 171D, 3R, 1Pop | | Augustus O. Bacon (D) | Alexander S. Clay (D) | 11D | Bryan/ Stevenson (D) ✗ |
| 1904 | Joseph M. Terrell (D) | no such office | Philip Cook, Jr. (D) | John C. Hart (D) | William B. Merritt (D) | O. B. Stevens (D) | William Ambrose Wright (D) | no such office | R. E. Park | 40D, 2R, 2Pop | 171D, 3R, 1Pop | | Augustus O. Bacon (D) | Alexander S. Clay (D) | 11D | Parker/ Davis (D) ✗ |
| 1905 | Joseph M. Terrell (D) | no such office | Philip Cook, Jr. (D) | John C. Hart (D) | William B. Merritt (D) | O. B. Stevens (D) | William Ambrose Wright (D) | no such office | R. E. Park | 44D | 173D, 2R | | Augustus O. Bacon (D) | Alexander S. Clay (D) | 11D | Parker/ Davis (D) ✗ |
| 1905 | Joseph M. Terrell (D) | no such office | Philip Cook, Jr. (D) | John C. Hart (D) | William B. Merritt (D) | Thomas G. Hudson (D) (Note: Resigned to run for governor.) | William Ambrose Wright (D) | no such office | R. E. Park | 44D | 173D, 2R | | Augustus O. Bacon (D) | Alexander S. Clay (D) | 11D | Parker/ Davis (D) ✗ |
| 1906 | Joseph M. Terrell (D) | no such office | Philip Cook, Jr. (D) | John C. Hart (D) | William B. Merritt (D) | Thomas G. Hudson (D) | William Ambrose Wright (D) | no such office | R. E. Park | 44D | 173D, 2R | | Augustus O. Bacon (D) | Alexander S. Clay (D) | 11D | Parker/ Davis (D) ✗ |
| 1907 | Joseph M. Terrell (D) | no such office | Philip Cook, Jr. (D) | John C. Hart (D) | Jere M. Pound (D) (Note: Resigned to accept the presidency of the Gordon Military Institute.) | Thomas G. Hudson (D) | William Ambrose Wright (D) | no such office | R. E. Park | 44D | 170D, 3R, 2Pop, 8? | 5D | Augustus O. Bacon (D) | Alexander S. Clay (D) | 11D | Parker/ Davis (D) ✗ |
| 1907 | Hoke Smith (D) | no such office | Philip Cook, Jr. (D) | John C. Hart (D) | Jere M. Pound (D) | Thomas G. Hudson (D) | William Ambrose Wright (D) | no such office | R. E. Park | 44D | 170D, 3R, 2Pop, 8? | 5D | Augustus O. Bacon (D) | Alexander S. Clay (D) | 11D | Parker/ Davis (D) ✗ |
| 1908 | Hoke Smith (D) | no such office | Philip Cook, Jr. (D) | John C. Hart (D) | Jere M. Pound (D) | Thomas G. Hudson (D) | William Ambrose Wright (D) | no such office | R. E. Park | 44D | 170D, 3R, 2Pop, 8? | 5D | Augustus O. Bacon (D) | Alexander S. Clay (D) | 11D | Bryan/ Kern (D) ✗ |
| 1909 | Hoke Smith (D) | no such office | Philip Cook, Jr. (D) | John C. Hart (D) | Jere M. Pound (D) | Thomas G. Hudson (D) | William Ambrose Wright (D) | no such office | J. Pope Brown | 44D | 184D | 5D | Augustus O. Bacon (D) | Alexander S. Clay (D) | 11D | Bryan/ Kern (D) ✗ |
| 1909 | Joseph Mackey Brown (D) | no such office | Philip Cook, Jr. (D) | John C. Hart (D) | Jere M. Pound (D) | Thomas G. Hudson (D) | William Ambrose Wright (D) | no such office | J. Pope Brown | 44D | 184D | 5D | Augustus O. Bacon (D) | Alexander S. Clay (D) | 11D | Bryan/ Kern (D) ✗ |
| 1910 | Joseph Mackey Brown (D) | no such office | Philip Cook, Jr. (D) | John C. Hart (D) | Jere M. Pound (D) | Thomas G. Hudson (D) | William Ambrose Wright (D) | no such office | J. Pope Brown | 44D | 184D | 5D | Augustus O. Bacon (D) | Alexander S. Clay (D) | 11D | Bryan/ Kern (D) ✗ |
| 1910 | Joseph Mackey Brown (D) | no such office | Philip Cook, Jr. (D) | Hewlett A. Hall (D) | Marion L. Brittain (D) (Note: Resigned to take the position of President of the Georgia School of Technology.) | Thomas G. Hudson (D) | William Ambrose Wright (D) | no such office | J. Pope Brown | 44D | 184D | 5D | Augustus O. Bacon (D) | Joseph M. Terrell (D) | 11D | Bryan/ Kern (D) ✗ |
| 1911 | Joseph Mackey Brown (D) | no such office | Philip Cook, Jr. (D) | Hewlett A. Hall (D) | Marion L. Brittain (D) | Thomas G. Hudson (D) | William Ambrose Wright (D) | no such office | W. J. Speer | 43D, 1R | 183D, 1R | 5D | Augustus O. Bacon (D) | Joseph M. Terrell (D) | 11D | Bryan/ Kern (D) ✗ |
| 1911 | Hoke Smith (D) | no such office | Philip Cook, Jr. (D) | Thomas S. Felder (D) | Marion L. Brittain (D) | Thomas G. Hudson (D) | William Ambrose Wright (D) | no such office | W. J. Speer | 43D, 1R | 183D, 1R | 5D | Augustus O. Bacon (D) | Joseph M. Terrell (D) | 11D | Bryan/ Kern (D) ✗ |
| 1911 | John M. Slaton (D) | no such office | Philip Cook, Jr. (D) | Thomas S. Felder (D) | Marion L. Brittain (D) | Thomas G. Hudson (D) | William Ambrose Wright (D) | no such office | W. J. Speer | 43D, 1R | 183D, 1R | 5D | Augustus O. Bacon (D) | Hoke Smith (D) | 11D | Bryan/ Kern (D) ✗ |
| 1912 | Joseph Mackey Brown (D) | no such office | Philip Cook, Jr. (D) | Thomas S. Felder (D) | Marion L. Brittain (D) | Thomas G. Hudson (D) | William Ambrose Wright (D) | no such office | W. J. Speer | 43D, 1R | 183D, 1R | 5D | Augustus O. Bacon (D) | Hoke Smith (D) | 11D | Wilson/ Marshall (D) ✓ |
| 1912 | Joseph Mackey Brown (D) | no such office | Philip Cook, Jr. (D) | Thomas S. Felder (D) | Marion L. Brittain (D) | James J. Conner (D) | William Ambrose Wright (D) | no such office | W. J. Speer | 43D, 1R | 183D, 1R | 5D | Augustus O. Bacon (D) | Hoke Smith (D) | 11D | Wilson/ Marshall (D) ✓ |
| 1913 | John M. Slaton (D) | no such office | Philip Cook, Jr. (D) | Thomas S. Felder (D) | Marion L. Brittain (D) | James D. Price (D) | William Ambrose Wright (D) | no such office | W. J. Speer | 43D, 1R | 183D, 1R | 5D | Augustus O. Bacon (D) | Hoke Smith (D) | 12D | Wilson/ Marshall (D) ✓ |
| 1914 | John M. Slaton (D) | no such office | Philip Cook, Jr. (D) | Warren Grice (D) | Marion L. Brittain (D) | James D. Price (D) | William Ambrose Wright (D) | no such office | W. J. Speer | 43D, 1R | 183D, 1R | 5D | Augustus O. Bacon (D) | Hoke Smith (D) | 12D | Wilson/ Marshall (D) ✓ |
| 1914 | John M. Slaton (D) | no such office | Philip Cook, Jr. (D) | Warren Grice (D) | Marion L. Brittain (D) | James D. Price (D) | William Ambrose Wright (D) | no such office | W. J. Speer | 43D, 1R | 183D, 1R | 5D | William Stanley West (D) | Hoke Smith (D) | 12D | Wilson/ Marshall (D) ✓ |
| 1914 | John M. Slaton (D) | no such office | Philip Cook, Jr. (D) | Warren Grice (D) | Marion L. Brittain (D) | James D. Price (D) | William Ambrose Wright (D) | no such office | W. J. Speer | 43D, 1R | 183D, 1R | 5D | Thomas W. Hardwick (D) | Hoke Smith (D) | 12D | Wilson/ Marshall (D) ✓ |
| 1915 | Nathaniel Edwin Harris (D) | no such office | Philip Cook, Jr. (D) | Clifford Walker (D) | Marion L. Brittain (D) | James D. Price (D) | William Ambrose Wright (D) | no such office | W. J. Speer | 43D, 1R | 188D, 1R | 5D | Thomas W. Hardwick (D) | Hoke Smith (D) | 12D | Wilson/ Marshall (D) ✓ |
| 1916 | Nathaniel Edwin Harris (D) | no such office | Philip Cook, Jr. (D) | Clifford Walker (D) | Marion L. Brittain (D) | James D. Price (D) | William Ambrose Wright (D) | no such office | W. J. Speer | 43D, 1R | 188D, 1R | 5D | Thomas W. Hardwick (D) | Hoke Smith (D) | 12D | Wilson/ Marshall (D) ✓ |
| 1917 | Hugh Dorsey (D) | no such office | Philip Cook, Jr. (D) | Clifford Walker (D) | Marion L. Brittain (D) | J. J. Brown (D) | William Ambrose Wright (D) | no such office | W. J. Speer | 44D | 188D, 1R | 5D | Thomas W. Hardwick (D) | Hoke Smith (D) | 12D | Wilson/ Marshall (D) ✓ |
| 1918 | Hugh Dorsey (D) | no such office | Philip Cook, Jr. (D) | Clifford Walker (D) | Marion L. Brittain (D) | J. J. Brown (D) | William Ambrose Wright (D) | no such office | W. J. Speer | 44D | 188D, 1R | 5D | Thomas W. Hardwick (D) | Hoke Smith (D) | 12D | Wilson/ Marshall (D) ✓ |
| 1918 | Hugh Dorsey (D) | no such office | Henry Strange (D) | Clifford Walker (D) | Marion L. Brittain (D) | J. J. Brown (D) | William Ambrose Wright (D) | no such office | W. J. Speer | 44D | 188D, 1R | 5D | Thomas W. Hardwick (D) | Hoke Smith (D) | 12D | Wilson/ Marshall (D) ✓ |
| 1919 | Hugh Dorsey (D) | no such office | Samuel McLendon (D) | Clifford Walker (D) | Marion L. Brittain (D) | J. J. Brown (D) | William Ambrose Wright (D) | no such office | W. J. Speer | 51D | 190D, 3R | 5D | William J. Harris (D) | Hoke Smith (D) | 12D | Wilson/ Marshall (D) ✓ |
| 1920 | Hugh Dorsey (D) | no such office | Samuel McLendon (D) | R. A. Denny (D) | Marion L. Brittain (D) | J. J. Brown (D) | William Ambrose Wright (D) | no such office | W. J. Speer | 51D | 190D, 3R | 5D | William J. Harris (D) | Hoke Smith (D) | 12D | Cox/ Roosevelt (D) ✗ |
| 1921 | Thomas W. Hardwick (D) | no such office | Samuel McLendon (D) | George M. Napier (D) | Marion L. Brittain (D) | J. J. Brown (D) | William Ambrose Wright (D) | no such office | W. J. Speer | 50D, 1R | 202D, 4R | 5D | William J. Harris (D) | Thomas E. Watson (D) | 12D | Cox/ Roosevelt (D) ✗ |
| 1922 | Thomas W. Hardwick (D) | no such office | Samuel McLendon (D) | George M. Napier (D) | Marion L. Brittain (D) | J. J. Brown (D) | William Ambrose Wright (D) | no such office | W. J. Speer | 50D, 1R | 202D, 4R | 5D | William J. Harris (D) | Thomas E. Watson (D) | 12D | Cox/ Roosevelt (D) ✗ |
| 1922 | Thomas W. Hardwick (D) | no such office | Samuel McLendon (D) | George M. Napier (D) | Marvin M. Parks (D) | J. J. Brown (D) | William Ambrose Wright (D) | no such office | W. J. Speer | 50D, 1R | 202D, 4R | 5D | William J. Harris (D) | Rebecca Latimer Felton (D) | 12D | Cox/ Roosevelt (D) ✗ |
| 1922 | Thomas W. Hardwick (D) | no such office | Samuel McLendon (D) | George M. Napier (D) | Marvin M. Parks (D) | J. J. Brown (D) | William Ambrose Wright (D) | no such office | W. J. Speer | 50D, 1R | 202D, 4R | 5D | William J. Harris (D) | Walter F. George (D) | 12D | Cox/ Roosevelt (D) ✗ |
| 1923 | Clifford Walker (D) | no such office | Samuel McLendon (D) | George M. Napier (D) | Nathaniel H. Ballard (D) | J. J. Brown (D) | William Ambrose Wright (D) | no such office | W. J. Speer | 51D | 205D, 1R | 5D | William J. Harris (D) | Walter F. George (D) | 12D | Cox/ Roosevelt (D) ✗ |
| 1924 | Clifford Walker (D) | no such office | Samuel McLendon (D) | George M. Napier (D) | Nathaniel H. Ballard (D) | J. J. Brown (D) | William Ambrose Wright (D) | no such office | W. J. Speer | 51D | 205D, 1R | 5D | William J. Harris (D) | Walter F. George (D) | 12D | Davis/ Bryan (D) ✗ |
| 1925 | Clifford Walker (D) | no such office | Samuel McLendon (D) | George M. Napier (D) | Fort E. Land (D) | J. J. Brown (D) | William Ambrose Wright (D) | no such office | W. J. Speer | 50D, 1R | 204D, 2R | 5D | William J. Harris (D) | Walter F. George (D) | 12D | Davis/ Bryan (D) ✗ |
| 1926 | Clifford Walker (D) | no such office | Samuel McLendon (D) | George M. Napier (D) | Fort E. Land (D) | J. J. Brown (D) | William Ambrose Wright (D) | no such office | W. J. Speer | 50D, 1R | 204D, 2R | 5D | William J. Harris (D) | Walter F. George (D) | 12D | Davis/ Bryan (D) ✗ |
| 1927 | Lamartine Griffin Hardman (D) | no such office | Samuel McLendon (D) | George M. Napier (D) | Fort E. Land (D) | Eugene Talmadge (D) | William Ambrose Wright (D) | no such office | W. J. Speer | 50D, 1R | 204D, 2R | 5D | William J. Harris (D) | Walter F. George (D) | 12D | Davis/ Bryan (D) ✗ |
| 1927 | Lamartine Griffin Hardman (D) | no such office | Samuel McLendon (D) | George M. Napier (D) | Mell L. Duggan (D) | Eugene Talmadge (D) | William Ambrose Wright (D) | no such office | W. J. Speer | 50D, 1R | 204D, 2R | 5D | William J. Harris (D) | Walter F. George (D) | 12D | Davis/ Bryan (D) ✗ |
| 1928 | Lamartine Griffin Hardman (D) | no such office | Samuel McLendon (D) | George M. Napier (D) | Mell L. Duggan (D) | Eugene Talmadge (D) | William Ambrose Wright (D) | no such office | W. J. Speer | 50D, 1R | 204D, 2R | 5D | William J. Harris (D) | Walter F. George (D) | 12D | Smith/ Robinson (D) ✗ |
| 1928 | Lamartine Griffin Hardman (D) | no such office | George Henry Carswell (D) | George M. Napier (D) | Mell L. Duggan (D) | Eugene Talmadge (D) | William Ambrose Wright (D) | no such office | W. J. Speer | 50D, 1R | 204D, 2R | 5D | William J. Harris (D) | Walter F. George (D) | 12D | Smith/ Robinson (D) ✗ |
| 1929 | Lamartine Griffin Hardman (D) | no such office | George Henry Carswell (D) | George M. Napier (D) | Mell L. Duggan (D) | Eugene Talmadge (D) | William Ambrose Wright (D) | no such office | W. J. Speer | 51D | 204D, 3R | 5D | William J. Harris (D) | Walter F. George (D) | 12D | Smith/ Robinson (D) ✗ |
| 1929 | Lamartine Griffin Hardman (D) | no such office | George Henry Carswell (D) | George M. Napier (D) | Mell L. Duggan (D) | Eugene Talmadge (D) | William B. Harrison (D) (Note: Removed from office by Governor Eugene Talmadge due to a dispute over authorizing funds for certain charitable organizations.) | no such office | W. J. Speer | 51D | 204D, 3R | 5D | William J. Harris (D) | Walter F. George (D) | 12D | Smith/ Robinson (D) ✗ |
| 1930 | Lamartine Griffin Hardman (D) | no such office | George Henry Carswell (D) | George M. Napier (D) | Mell L. Duggan (D) | Eugene Talmadge (D) | William B. Harrison (D) | no such office | W. J. Speer | 51D | 204D, 3R | 5D | William J. Harris (D) | Walter F. George (D) | 12D | Smith/ Robinson (D) ✗ |
| 1931 | Richard Russell Jr. (D) | no such office | John B. Wilson (D) | George M. Napier (D) | Mell L. Duggan (D) | Eugene Talmadge (D) | William B. Harrison (D) | no such office | M. L. Ledford | 50D, 1R | 207D | 5D | William J. Harris (D) | Walter F. George (D) | 12D | Smith/ Robinson (D) ✗ |
| 1932 | Richard Russell Jr. (D) | no such office | John B. Wilson (D) | George M. Napier (D) | Mell L. Duggan (D) | Eugene Talmadge (D) | William B. Harrison (D) | no such office | M. L. Ledford | 50D, 1R | 207D | 5D | William J. Harris (D) | Walter F. George (D) | 12D | Roosevelt/ Garner (D) ✓ |
| 1932 | Richard Russell Jr. (D) | no such office | John B. Wilson (D) | Lawrence S. Camp (D) | Mell L. Duggan (D) | Eugene Talmadge (D) | William B. Harrison (D) | no such office | M. L. Ledford | 50D, 1R | 207D | 5D | John S. Cohen (D) | Walter F. George (D) | 12D | Roosevelt/ Garner (D) ✓ |
| 1933 | Eugene Talmadge (D) | no such office | John B. Wilson (D) | M. J. Yeomans (D) | Mauney D. Collins (D) (Note: Retired.) | G. C. Adams (D) | William B. Harrison (D) | no such office | George B. Hamilton (D) | 50D, 1R | 205D | 5D | Richard Russell Jr. (D) | Walter F. George (D) | 10D | Roosevelt/ Garner (D) ✓ |
| 1934 | Eugene Talmadge (D) | no such office | John B. Wilson (D) | M. J. Yeomans (D) | Mauney D. Collins (D) | G. C. Adams (D) | William B. Harrison (D) | no such office | George B. Hamilton (D) | 50D, 1R | 205D | 5D | Richard Russell Jr. (D) | Walter F. George (D) | 10D | Roosevelt/ Garner (D) ✓ |
| 1935 | Eugene Talmadge (D) | no such office | John B. Wilson (D) | M. J. Yeomans (D) | Mauney D. Collins (D) | Tom Linder (D) | William B. Harrison (D) | no such office | George B. Hamilton (D) | 50D, 1R | 203D, 2R | 5D | Richard Russell Jr. (D) | Walter F. George (D) | 10D | Roosevelt/ Garner (D) ✓ |
| 1936 | Eugene Talmadge (D) | no such office | John B. Wilson (D) | M. J. Yeomans (D) | Mauney D. Collins (D) | Tom Linder (D) | William B. Harrison (D) | no such office | George B. Hamilton (D) | 50D, 1R | 203D, 2R | 5D | Richard Russell Jr. (D) | Walter F. George (D) | 10D | Roosevelt/ Garner (D) ✓ |
| 1936 | Eugene Talmadge (D) | no such office | John B. Wilson (D) | M. J. Yeomans (D) | Mauney D. Collins (D) | Tom Linder (D) | Glenn B. Carreker (D) (Note: Appointed by Governor Eugene Talmadge to replace William B. Harrison, an action disputed by Harrison.) | no such office | George B. Hamilton (D) | 50D, 1R | 203D, 2R | 5D | Richard Russell Jr. (D) | Walter F. George (D) | 10D | Roosevelt/ Garner (D) ✓ |
| 1936 | Eugene Talmadge (D) | no such office | John B. Wilson (D) | M. J. Yeomans (D) | Mauney D. Collins (D) | Tom Linder (D) | Homer C. Parker (D) (Note: Appointed by Governor Eugene Talmadge to replace Carreker and fill out the remainder of the term.) | no such office | George B. Hamilton (D) | 50D, 1R | 203D, 2R | 5D | Richard Russell Jr. (D) | Walter F. George (D) | 10D | Roosevelt/ Garner (D) ✓ |
| 1937 | Eurith D. Rivers (D) | no such office | John B. Wilson (D) | M. J. Yeomans (D) | Mauney D. Collins (D) | Columbus Roberts (D) | William B. Harrison (D) (Note: Restored to his office at the beginning of the 1937 legislative term.) | no such office | George B. Hamilton (D) | 50D, 1R | 204D, 1R | 5D | Richard Russell Jr. (D) | Walter F. George (D) | 10D | Roosevelt/ Garner (D) ✓ |
| 1938 | Eurith D. Rivers (D) | no such office | John B. Wilson (D) | M. J. Yeomans (D) | Mauney D. Collins (D) | Columbus Roberts (D) | William B. Harrison (D) | Ben Huiet (D) | George B. Hamilton (D) | 50D, 1R | 204D, 1R | 5D | Richard Russell Jr. (D) | Walter F. George (D) | 10D | Roosevelt/ Garner (D) ✓ |
| 1939 | Eurith D. Rivers (D) | no such office | John B. Wilson (D) | M. J. Yeomans (D) | Mauney D. Collins (D) | Columbus Roberts (D) | William B. Harrison (D) | Ben Huiet (D) | George B. Hamilton (D) | 51D, 1R | 204D, 1R | 5D | Richard Russell Jr. (D) | Walter F. George (D) | 10D | Roosevelt/ Garner (D) ✓ |
| 1939 | Eurith D. Rivers (D) | no such office | John B. Wilson (D) | Ellis Arnall (D) | Mauney D. Collins (D) | Columbus Roberts (D) | William B. Harrison (D) | Ben Huiet (D) | George B. Hamilton (D) | 51D, 1R | 204D, 1R | 5D | Richard Russell Jr. (D) | Walter F. George (D) | 10D | Roosevelt/ Garner (D) ✓ |
| 1940 | Eurith D. Rivers (D) | no such office | John B. Wilson (D) | Ellis Arnall (D) | Mauney D. Collins (D) | Columbus Roberts (D) | William B. Harrison (D) | Ben Huiet (D) | George B. Hamilton (D) | 51D, 1R | 204D, 1R | 5D | Richard Russell Jr. (D) | Walter F. George (D) | 10D | Roosevelt/ Wallace (D) ✓ |
| 1940 | Eurith D. Rivers (D) | no such office | John B. Wilson (D) | Ellis Arnall (D) | Mauney D. Collins (D) | Columbus Roberts (D) | Downing Musgrove (D) | Ben Huiet (D) | George B. Hamilton (D) | 51D, 1R | 204D, 1R | 5D | Richard Russell Jr. (D) | Walter F. George (D) | 10D | Roosevelt/ Wallace (D) ✓ |
| 1941 | Eugene Talmadge (D) | no such office | John B. Wilson (D) | Ellis Arnall (D) | Mauney D. Collins (D) | Tom Linder (D) | Homer C. Parker (D) | Ben Huiet (D) | George B. Hamilton (D) | 51D, 1R | 204D, 1R | 5D | Richard Russell Jr. (D) | Walter F. George (D) | 10D | Roosevelt/ Wallace (D) ✓ |
| 1942 | Eugene Talmadge (D) | no such office | John B. Wilson (D) | Ellis Arnall (D) | Mauney D. Collins (D) | Tom Linder (D) | Homer C. Parker (D) | Ben Huiet (D) | George B. Hamilton (D) | 51D, 1R | 204D, 1R | 5D | Richard Russell Jr. (D) | Walter F. George (D) | 10D | Roosevelt/ Wallace (D) ✓ |
| 1943 | Ellis Arnall (D) | no such office | John B. Wilson (D) | T. Grady Head (D) | Mauney D. Collins (D) | Tom Linder (D) | Homer C. Parker (D) | Ben Huiet (D) | George B. Hamilton (D) | 51D, 1R | 204D, 1R | 5D | Richard Russell Jr. (D) | Walter F. George (D) | 10D | Roosevelt/ Wallace (D) ✓ |
| 1944 | Ellis Arnall (D) | no such office | John B. Wilson (D) | T. Grady Head (D) | Mauney D. Collins (D) | Tom Linder (D) | Homer C. Parker (D) | Ben Huiet (D) | George B. Hamilton (D) | 51D, 1R | 204D, 1R | 5D | Richard Russell Jr. (D) | Walter F. George (D) | 10D | Roosevelt/ Truman (D) ✓ |
| 1945 | Ellis Arnall (D) | no such office | John B. Wilson (D) | Eugene Cook (D) | Mauney D. Collins (D) | Tom Linder (D) | Homer C. Parker (D) | Ben Huiet (D) | George B. Hamilton (D) | 51D, 1R | 204D, 1R | 5D | Richard Russell Jr. (D) | Walter F. George (D) | 10D | Roosevelt/ Truman (D) ✓ |
| 1946 | Ellis Arnall (D) | no such office | John B. Wilson (D) | Eugene Cook (D) | Mauney D. Collins (D) | Tom Linder (D) | Homer C. Parker (D) | Ben Huiet (D) | George B. Hamilton (D) | 51D, 1R | 204D, 1R | 5D | Richard Russell Jr. (D) | Walter F. George (D) | 10D | Roosevelt/ Truman (D) ✓ |
| 1946 | Ellis Arnall (D) | no such office | Benjamin W. Fortson Jr. (D) (Note: Appointed secretary of state in 1946 to fill the unexpired term of John B. Wilson, who died in office.) | Eugene Cook (D) | Mauney D. Collins (D) | Tom Linder (D) | William R. Mitchell (D) | Ben Huiet (D) | George B. Hamilton (D) | 51D, 1R | 204D, 1R | 5D | Richard Russell Jr. (D) | Walter F. George (D) | 10D | Roosevelt/ Truman (D) ✓ |
| 1947 | Ellis Arnall (D) | Melvin E. Thompson (D) | Benjamin W. Fortson Jr. (D) | Eugene Cook (D) | Mauney D. Collins (D) | Tom Linder (D) | Zack D. Cravey (D) | Ben Huiet (D) | George B. Hamilton (D) | 53D, 1R | 204D, 1R | 5D | Richard Russell Jr. (D) | Walter F. George (D) | 10D | Roosevelt/ Truman (D) ✓ |
| 1947 | Herman Talmadge (D) | Melvin E. Thompson (D) | Benjamin W. Fortson Jr. (D) | Eugene Cook (D) | Mauney D. Collins (D) | Tom Linder (D) | Zack D. Cravey (D) | Ben Huiet (D) | George B. Hamilton (D) | 53D, 1R | 204D, 1R | 5D | Richard Russell Jr. (D) | Walter F. George (D) | 10D | Roosevelt/ Truman (D) ✓ |
| 1947 | Melvin E. Thompson (D) (Note: Eugene Talmadge was elected to a third non-consecutive term in 1946 but died before taking office. Incumbent Governor Ellis Arnall and Lieutenant Governor-elect Melvin E. Thompson both claimed the office. The state legislature chose Eugene Talmadge's son, Herman Talmadge, to be governor, and he took office in January 1947, but the state Supreme Court later that year declared this unconstitutional and declared Thompson the rightful acting governor, and Talmadge stepped down after 67 days in office.) | vacant | Benjamin W. Fortson Jr. (D) | Eugene Cook (D) | Mauney D. Collins (D) | Tom Linder (D) | Zack D. Cravey (D) | Ben Huiet (D) | George B. Hamilton (D) | 53D, 1R | 204D, 1R | 5D | Richard Russell Jr. (D) | Walter F. George (D) | 10D | Roosevelt/ Truman (D) ✓ |
| 1948 | Melvin E. Thompson (D) | vacant | Benjamin W. Fortson Jr. (D) | Eugene Cook (D) | Mauney D. Collins (D) | Tom Linder (D) | Zack D. Cravey (D) | Ben Huiet (D) | George B. Hamilton (D) | 53D, 1R | 204D, 1R | 5D | Richard Russell Jr. (D) | Walter F. George (D) | 10D | Truman/ Barkley (D) ✓ |
| 1948 | Herman Talmadge (D) (Note: Talmadge defeated Thompson in a special election in September 1948.) | Marvin Griffin (D) | Benjamin W. Fortson Jr. (D) | Eugene Cook (D) | Mauney D. Collins (D) | Tom Linder (D) | Zack D. Cravey (D) | Ben Huiet (D) | George B. Hamilton (D) | 53D, 1R | 204D, 1R | 5D | Richard Russell Jr. (D) | Walter F. George (D) | 10D | Truman/ Barkley (D) ✓ |
| 1949 | Herman Talmadge (D) | Marvin Griffin (D) | Benjamin W. Fortson Jr. (D) | Eugene Cook (D) | Mauney D. Collins (D) | Tom Linder (D) | Zack D. Cravey (D) | Ben Huiet (D) | George B. Hamilton (D) | 53D, 1R | 203D, 2R | 5D | Richard Russell Jr. (D) | Walter F. George (D) | 10D | Truman/ Barkley (D) ✓ |
| 1950 | Herman Talmadge (D) | Marvin Griffin (D) | Benjamin W. Fortson Jr. (D) | Eugene Cook (D) | Mauney D. Collins (D) | Tom Linder (D) | Zack D. Cravey (D) | Ben Huiet (D) | George B. Hamilton (D) | 53D, 1R | 203D, 2R | 5D | Richard Russell Jr. (D) | Walter F. George (D) | 10D | Truman/ Barkley (D) ✓ |
| 1951 | Herman Talmadge (D) | Marvin Griffin (D) | Benjamin W. Fortson Jr. (D) | Eugene Cook (D) | Mauney D. Collins (D) | Tom Linder (D) | Zack D. Cravey (D) | Ben Huiet (D) | George B. Hamilton (D) | 54D | 204D, 1R | 5D | Richard Russell Jr. (D) | Walter F. George (D) | 10D | Truman/ Barkley (D) ✓ |
| 1952 | Herman Talmadge (D) | Marvin Griffin (D) | Benjamin W. Fortson Jr. (D) | Eugene Cook (D) | Mauney D. Collins (D) | Tom Linder (D) | Zack D. Cravey (D) | Ben Huiet (D) | George B. Hamilton (D) | 54D | 204D, 1R | 5D | Richard Russell Jr. (D) | Walter F. George (D) | 10D | Stevenson/ Sparkman (D) ✗ |
| 1953 | Herman Talmadge (D) | Marvin Griffin (D) | Benjamin W. Fortson Jr. (D) | Eugene Cook (D) | Mauney D. Collins (D) | Tom Linder (D) | Zack D. Cravey (D) | Ben Huiet (D) | George B. Hamilton (D) | 53D, 1R | 204D, 1R | 5D | Richard Russell Jr. (D) | Walter F. George (D) | 10D | Stevenson/ Sparkman (D) ✗ |
| 1954 | Herman Talmadge (D) | Marvin Griffin (D) | Benjamin W. Fortson Jr. (D) | Eugene Cook (D) | Mauney D. Collins (D) | Tom Linder (D) | Zack D. Cravey (D) | Ben Huiet (D) | George B. Hamilton (D) | 53D, 1R | 204D, 1R | 5D | Richard Russell Jr. (D) | Walter F. George (D) | 10D | Stevenson/ Sparkman (D) ✗ |
| 1955 | Marvin Griffin (D) | Ernest Vandiver (D) | Benjamin W. Fortson Jr. (D) | Eugene Cook (D) | Mauney D. Collins (D) | Phil Campbell (D) | Zack D. Cravey (D) | Ben Huiet (D) | George B. Hamilton (D) | 53D, 1R | 202D, 3R | 5D | Richard Russell Jr. (D) | Walter F. George (D) | 10D | Stevenson/ Sparkman (D) ✗ |
| 1956 | Marvin Griffin (D) | Ernest Vandiver (D) | Benjamin W. Fortson Jr. (D) | Eugene Cook (D) | Mauney D. Collins (D) | Phil Campbell (D) | Zack D. Cravey (D) | Ben Huiet (D) | George B. Hamilton (D) | 53D, 1R | 202D, 3R | 5D | Richard Russell Jr. (D) | Walter F. George (D) | 10D | Stevenson/ Kefauver (D) ✗ |
| 1957 | Marvin Griffin (D) | Ernest Vandiver (D) | Benjamin W. Fortson Jr. (D) | Eugene Cook (D) | Mauney D. Collins (D) | Phil Campbell (D) | Zack D. Cravey (D) | Ben Huiet (D) | George B. Hamilton (D) | 53D, 1R | 202D, 3R | 5D | Richard Russell Jr. (D) | Herman Talmadge (D) | 10D | Stevenson/ Kefauver (D) ✗ |
| 1958 | Marvin Griffin (D) | Ernest Vandiver (D) | Benjamin W. Fortson Jr. (D) | Eugene Cook (D) | Claude Purcell (D) (Note: Resigned after the United States District Court for the Southern District of Georgia ordered Taliaferro County School District to desegregate following the court's decision on Turner vs. Goolsby.) | Phil Campbell (D) | Zack D. Cravey (D) | Ben Huiet (D) | George B. Hamilton (D) | 53D, 1R | 202D, 3R | 5D | Richard Russell Jr. (D) | Herman Talmadge (D) | 10D | Stevenson/ Kefauver (D) ✗ |
| 1959 | Ernest Vandiver (D) | Garland T. Byrd (D) | Benjamin W. Fortson Jr. (D) | Eugene Cook (D) | Claude Purcell (D) | Phil Campbell (D) | Zack D. Cravey (D) | Ben Huiet (D) | George B. Hamilton (D) | 53D, 1R | 202D, 3R | 5D | Richard Russell Jr. (D) | Herman Talmadge (D) | 10D | Stevenson/ Kefauver (D) ✗ |
| 1960 | Ernest Vandiver (D) | Garland T. Byrd (D) | Benjamin W. Fortson Jr. (D) | Eugene Cook (D) | Claude Purcell (D) | Phil Campbell (D) | Zack D. Cravey (D) | Ben Huiet (D) | George B. Hamilton (D) | 53D, 1R | 202D, 3R | 5D | Richard Russell Jr. (D) | Herman Talmadge (D) | 10D | Kennedy/ Johnson (D) ✓ |
| 1961 | Ernest Vandiver (D) | Garland T. Byrd (D) | Benjamin W. Fortson Jr. (D) | Eugene Cook (D) | Claude Purcell (D) | Phil Campbell (D) | Zack D. Cravey (D) | Ben Huiet (D) | Jack B. Ray (D) | 53D, 1R | 203D, 2R | 5D | Richard Russell Jr. (D) | Herman Talmadge (D) | 10D | Kennedy/ Johnson (D) ✓ |
| 1962 | Ernest Vandiver (D) | Garland T. Byrd (D) | Benjamin W. Fortson Jr. (D) | Eugene Cook (D) | Claude Purcell (D) | Phil Campbell (D) | Zack D. Cravey (D) | Ben Huiet (D) | Jack B. Ray (D) | 53D, 1R | 203D, 2R | 5D | Richard Russell Jr. (D) | Herman Talmadge (D) | 10D | Kennedy/ Johnson (D) ✓ |
| 1963 | Carl Sanders (D) | Peter Zack Geer (D) | Benjamin W. Fortson Jr. (D) | Eugene Cook (D) | Claude Purcell (D) | Phil Campbell (D) | James L. Bentley (D) | Ben Huiet (D) | Jack B. Ray (D) | 50D, 4R | 203D, 2R | 5D | Richard Russell Jr. (D) | Herman Talmadge (D) | 10D | Kennedy/ Johnson (D) ✓ |
| 1964 | Carl Sanders (D) | Peter Zack Geer (D) | Benjamin W. Fortson Jr. (D) | Eugene Cook (D) | Claude Purcell (D) | Phil Campbell (D) | James L. Bentley (D) | Ben Huiet (D) | Jack B. Ray (D) | 50D, 4R | 203D, 2R | 5D | Richard Russell Jr. (D) | Herman Talmadge (D) | 10D | Goldwater/ Miller (R) ✗ |
| 1965 | Carl Sanders (D) | Peter Zack Geer (D) | Benjamin W. Fortson Jr. (D) | Arthur K. Bolton (D) | Claude Purcell (D) | Phil Campbell (D) | James L. Bentley (D) | Ben Huiet (D) | Jack B. Ray (D) | 44D, 9R, 2I | 198D, 7R | 5D | Richard Russell Jr. (D) | Herman Talmadge (D) | 9D, 1R | Goldwater/ Miller (R) ✗ |
| 1966 | Carl Sanders (D) | Peter Zack Geer (D) | Benjamin W. Fortson Jr. (D) | Arthur K. Bolton (D) | Jack P. Nix (D) | Phil Campbell (D) | James L. Bentley (D) | Ben Huiet (D) | Jack B. Ray (D) | 44D, 9R, 2I | 188D, 17R | 5D | Richard Russell Jr. (D) | Herman Talmadge (D) | 9D, 1R | Goldwater/ Miller (R) ✗ |
| 1967 | Lester Maddox (D) | George T. Smith (D) | Benjamin W. Fortson Jr. (D) | Arthur K. Bolton (D) | Jack P. Nix (D) | Phil Campbell (D) | James L. Bentley (D) | Sam Caldwell (D) | Jack B. Ray (D) | 46D, 7R, 1I | 183D, 22R | 5D | Richard Russell Jr. (D) | Herman Talmadge (D) | 8D, 2R | Goldwater/ Miller (R) ✗ |
| 1968 | Lester Maddox (D) | George T. Smith (D) | Benjamin W. Fortson Jr. (D) | Arthur K. Bolton (D) | Jack P. Nix (D) | Phil Campbell (R) (Note: Switched parties from Democratic to Republican after the 1968 Democratic National Convention.) | James L. Bentley (R) | Sam Caldwell (D) | Jack B. Ray (R) | 46D, 7R, 1I | 183D, 22R | 3D, 2R | Richard Russell Jr. (D) | Herman Talmadge (D) | 8D, 2R | Wallace/ LeMay (AI) ✗ |
| 1969 | Lester Maddox (D) | George T. Smith (D) | Benjamin W. Fortson Jr. (D) | Arthur K. Bolton (D) | Jack P. Nix (D) | Tommy Irvin (D) | James L. Bentley (R) | Sam Caldwell (D) | Jack B. Ray (R) | 48D, 7R, 1I | 169D, 26R | 3D, 2R | Richard Russell Jr. (D) | Herman Talmadge (D) | 8D, 2R | Wallace/ LeMay (AI) ✗ |
| 1970 | Lester Maddox (D) | George T. Smith (D) | Benjamin W. Fortson Jr. (D) | Arthur K. Bolton (D) | Jack P. Nix (D) | Tommy Irvin (D) | James L. Bentley (R) | Sam Caldwell (D) | Jack B. Ray (R) | 48D, 7R, 1I | 169D, 26R | 3D, 2R | Richard Russell Jr. (D) | Herman Talmadge (D) | 8D, 2R | Wallace/ LeMay (AI) ✗ |
| 1971 | Jimmy Carter (D) | Lester Maddox (D) | Benjamin W. Fortson Jr. (D) | Arthur K. Bolton (D) | Jack P. Nix (D) | Tommy Irvin (D) | Johnnie L. Caldwell (D) | Sam Caldwell (D) | Bill Burson (D) | 50D, 6R | 173D, 22R | 4D, 1R | Richard Russell Jr. (D) | Herman Talmadge (D) | 8D, 2R | Wallace/ LeMay (AI) ✗ |
| 1971 | Jimmy Carter (D) | Lester Maddox (D) | Benjamin W. Fortson Jr. (D) | Arthur K. Bolton (D) | Jack P. Nix (D) | Tommy Irvin (D) | Johnnie L. Caldwell (D) | Sam Caldwell (D) | Bill Burson (D) | 50D, 6R | 173D, 22R | 4D, 1R | David H. Gambrell (D) | Herman Talmadge (D) | 8D, 2R | Wallace/ LeMay (AI) ✗ |
| 1972 | Jimmy Carter (D) | Lester Maddox (D) | Benjamin W. Fortson Jr. (D) | Arthur K. Bolton (D) | Jack P. Nix (D) | Tommy Irvin (D) | Johnnie L. Caldwell (D) | Sam Caldwell (D) | Bill Burson (D) | 50D, 6R | 173D, 22R | 5D | David H. Gambrell (D) | Herman Talmadge (D) | 8D, 2R | Nixon/ Agnew (R) ✓ |
| 1972 | Jimmy Carter (D) | Lester Maddox (D) | Benjamin W. Fortson Jr. (D) | Arthur K. Bolton (D) | Jack P. Nix (D) | Tommy Irvin (D) | Johnnie L. Caldwell (D) | Sam Caldwell (D) | Bill Burson (D) | 50D, 6R | 173D, 22R | 5D | Sam Nunn (D) | Herman Talmadge (D) | 8D, 2R | Nixon/ Agnew (R) ✓ |
| 1973 | Jimmy Carter (D) | Lester Maddox (D) | Benjamin W. Fortson Jr. (D) | Arthur K. Bolton (D) | Jack P. Nix (D) | Tommy Irvin (D) | Johnnie L. Caldwell (D) | Sam Caldwell (D) | Office Abolished | 48D, 8R | 152D, 27R | 5D | Sam Nunn (D) | Herman Talmadge (D) | 9D, 1R | Nixon/ Agnew (R) ✓ |
| 1974 | Jimmy Carter (D) | Lester Maddox (D) | Benjamin W. Fortson Jr. (D) | Arthur K. Bolton (D) | Jack P. Nix (D) | Tommy Irvin (D) | Johnnie L. Caldwell (D) | Sam Caldwell (D) | Office Abolished | 48D, 8R | 152D, 27R | 5D | Sam Nunn (D) | Herman Talmadge (D) | 9D, 1R | Nixon/ Agnew (R) ✓ |
| 1975 | George Busbee (D) | Zell Miller (D) | Benjamin W. Fortson Jr. (D) | Arthur K. Bolton (D) | Jack P. Nix (D) | Tommy Irvin (D) | Johnnie L. Caldwell (D) | Sam Caldwell (D) | Office Abolished | 51D, 5R | 155D, 24R | 5D | Sam Nunn (D) | Herman Talmadge (D) | 10D | Nixon/ Agnew (R) ✓ |
| 1976 | George Busbee (D) | Zell Miller (D) | Benjamin W. Fortson Jr. (D) | Arthur K. Bolton (D) | Jack P. Nix (D) | Tommy Irvin (D) | Johnnie L. Caldwell (D) | Sam Caldwell (D) | Office Abolished | 51D, 5R | 155D, 24R | 5D | Sam Nunn (D) | Herman Talmadge (D) | 10D | Carter/ Mondale (D) ✓ |
| 1977 | George Busbee (D) | Zell Miller (D) | Benjamin W. Fortson Jr. (D) | Arthur K. Bolton (D) | Jack P. Nix (D) | Tommy Irvin (D) | Johnnie L. Caldwell (D) | Sam Caldwell (D) | Office Abolished | 52D, 4R | 158D, 24R | 5D | Sam Nunn (D) | Herman Talmadge (D) | 10D | Carter/ Mondale (D) ✓ |
| 1977 | George Busbee (D) | Zell Miller (D) | Benjamin W. Fortson Jr. (D) | Arthur K. Bolton (D) | Charles McDaniel (D) | Tommy Irvin (D) | Johnnie L. Caldwell (D) | Sam Caldwell (D) | Office Abolished | 52D, 4R | 158D, 24R | 5D | Sam Nunn (D) | Herman Talmadge (D) | 10D | Carter/ Mondale (D) ✓ |
| 1978 | George Busbee (D) | Zell Miller (D) | Benjamin W. Fortson Jr. (D) | Arthur K. Bolton (D) | Charles McDaniel (D) | Tommy Irvin (D) | Johnnie L. Caldwell (D) | Sam Caldwell (D) | Office Abolished | 52D, 4R | 158D, 24R | 5D | Sam Nunn (D) | Herman Talmadge (D) | 10D | Carter/ Mondale (D) ✓ |
| 1979 | George Busbee (D) | Zell Miller (D) | Benjamin W. Fortson Jr. (D) | Arthur K. Bolton (D) | Charles McDaniel (D) | Tommy Irvin (D) | Johnnie L. Caldwell (D) | Sam Caldwell (D) | Office Abolished | 51D, 5R | 160D, 20R | 5D | Sam Nunn (D) | Herman Talmadge (D) | 9D, 1R | Carter/ Mondale (D) ✓ |
| 1979 | George Busbee (D) | Zell Miller (D) | David Poythress (D) (Note: Governor George Busbee appointed Poythress secretary of state to fill a vacancy created by the death of Fortson.) | Arthur K. Bolton (D) | Charles McDaniel (D) | Tommy Irvin (D) | Johnnie L. Caldwell (D) | Sam Caldwell (D) | Office Abolished | 51D, 5R | 160D, 20R | 5D | Sam Nunn (D) | Herman Talmadge (D) | 9D, 1R | Carter/ Mondale (D) ✓ |
| 1980 | George Busbee (D) | Zell Miller (D) | David Poythress (D) | Arthur K. Bolton (D) | Charles McDaniel (D) | Tommy Irvin (D) | Johnnie L. Caldwell (D) | Sam Caldwell (D) | Office Abolished | 51D, 5R | 160D, 20R | 5D | Sam Nunn (D) | Herman Talmadge (D) | 9D, 1R | Carter/ Mondale (D) ✗ |
| 1981 | George Busbee (D) | Zell Miller (D) | David Poythress (D) | Mike Bowers (D) | Charles McDaniel (D) | Tommy Irvin (D) | Johnnie L. Caldwell (D) | Sam Caldwell (D) | Office Abolished | 51D, 5R | 157D, 23R | 5D | Sam Nunn (D) | Mack Mattingly (R) | 9D, 1R | Carter/ Mondale (D) ✗ |
| 1982 | George Busbee (D) | Zell Miller (D) | David Poythress (D) | Mike Bowers (D) | Charles McDaniel (D) | Tommy Irvin (D) | Johnnie L. Caldwell (D) | Sam Caldwell (D) | Office Abolished | 51D, 5R | 157D, 23R | 5D | Sam Nunn (D) | Mack Mattingly (R) | 9D, 1R | Carter/ Mondale (D) ✗ |

== 1983–present ==
| Year | Executive offices | | | | | | | | General Assembly | | PSC | United States Congress | | | Electoral votes |
| Year | Governor | Lt. Governor | Sec. of State | Atty. Gen. | School Supt. | Comm. of Ag. | Comm. of Ins. (Note: Office of "comptroller general" renamed to "commissioner of insurance") | Comm. of Labor | State Senate | State House | PSC | U.S. Senator (Class II) | U.S. Senator (Class III) | U.S. House | Electoral votes |
|---|---|---|---|---|---|---|---|---|---|---|---|---|---|---|---|
| 1983 | Joe Frank Harris (D) | Zell Miller (D) | Max Cleland (D) | Mike Bowers (D) | Charles McDaniel (D) | Tommy Irvin (D) | Johnnie L. Caldwell (D) | Sam Caldwell (D) | 49D, 7R | 156D, 24R | 5D | Sam Nunn (D) | Mack Mattingly (R) | 9D, 1R | |
| 1984 | Joe Frank Harris (D) | Zell Miller (D) | Max Cleland (D) | Mike Bowers (D) | Charles McDaniel (D) | Tommy Irvin (D) | Johnnie L. Caldwell (D) | Joe Tanner (D) (Note: Resigned to accept an appointment as commissioner of the state Department of Natural Resources.) | 49D, 7R | 156D, 24R | 5D | Sam Nunn (D) | Mack Mattingly (R) | 9D, 1R | Reagan/ Bush (R) ✓ |
| 1985 | Joe Frank Harris (D) | Zell Miller (D) | Max Cleland (D) | Mike Bowers (D) | Charles McDaniel (D) | Tommy Irvin (D) | Johnnie L. Caldwell (D) | Joe Tanner (D) | 47D, 9R | 154D, 26R | 5D | Sam Nunn (D) | Mack Mattingly (R) | 8D, 2R | Reagan/ Bush (R) ✓ |
| 1985 | Joe Frank Harris (D) | Zell Miller (D) | Max Cleland (D) | Mike Bowers (D) | Charles McDaniel (D) | Tommy Irvin (D) | Warren D. Evans (D) (Note: Appointed Insurance Commissioner in 1985 to fill the vacancy created by the retirement of Johnnie L. Caldwell.) | Joe Tanner (D) | 47D, 9R | 154D, 26R | 5D | Sam Nunn (D) | Mack Mattingly (R) | 8D, 2R | Reagan/ Bush (R) ✓ |
| 1986 | Joe Frank Harris (D) | Zell Miller (D) | Max Cleland (D) | Mike Bowers (D) | Charles McDaniel (D) | Tommy Irvin (D) | Warren D. Evans (D) | Joe Tanner (D) | 47D, 9R | 154D, 26R | 5D | Sam Nunn (D) | Mack Mattingly (R) | 8D, 2R | Reagan/ Bush (R) ✓ |
| 1987 | Joe Frank Harris (D) | Zell Miller (D) | Max Cleland (D) | Mike Bowers (D) | Werner Rogers (D) | Tommy Irvin (D) | Warren D. Evans (D) | Joe Tanner (D) | 46D, 10R | 153D, 27R | 5D | Sam Nunn (D) | Wyche Fowler (D) | 8D, 2R | Reagan/ Bush (R) ✓ |
| 1988 | Joe Frank Harris (D) | Zell Miller (D) | Max Cleland (D) | Mike Bowers (D) | Werner Rogers (D) | Tommy Irvin (D) | Warren D. Evans (D) | Joe Tanner (D) | 46D, 10R | 153D, 27R | 5D | Sam Nunn (D) | Wyche Fowler (D) | 8D, 2R | Bush/ Quayle (R) ✓ |
| 1989 | Joe Frank Harris (D) | Zell Miller (D) | Max Cleland (D) | Mike Bowers (D) | Werner Rogers (D) | Tommy Irvin (D) | Warren D. Evans (D) | Joe Tanner (D) | 45D, 11R | 145D, 35R | 5D | Sam Nunn (D) | Wyche Fowler (D) | 9D, 1R | Bush/ Quayle (R) ✓ |
| 1990 | Joe Frank Harris (D) | Zell Miller (D) | Max Cleland (D) | Mike Bowers (D) | Werner Rogers (D) | Tommy Irvin (D) | Warren D. Evans (D) | Ray Hollingsworth (D) | 45D, 11R | 145D, 35R | 5D | Sam Nunn (D) | Wyche Fowler (D) | 9D, 1R | Bush/ Quayle (R) ✓ |
| 1991 | Zell Miller (D) | Pierre Howard (D) | Max Cleland (D) | Mike Bowers (D) | Werner Rogers (D) | Tommy Irvin (D) | Tim Ryles (D) | Al Scott (D) | 45D, 11R | 144D, 36R | 5D | Sam Nunn (D) | Wyche Fowler (D) | 9D, 1R | Bush/ Quayle (R) ✓ |
| 1992 | Zell Miller (D) | Pierre Howard (D) | Max Cleland (D) | Mike Bowers (D) | Werner Rogers (D) | Tommy Irvin (D) | Tim Ryles (D) | David Poythress (D) (Note: Poythress was elected to fill Tanner's unexpired term.) | 45D, 11R | 144D, 36R | 5D | Sam Nunn (D) | Wyche Fowler (D) | 9D, 1R | Clinton/ Gore (D) ✓ |
| 1993 | Zell Miller (D) | Pierre Howard (D) | Max Cleland (D) | Mike Bowers (D) | Werner Rogers (D) | Tommy Irvin (D) | Tim Ryles (D) | David Poythress (D) | 39D, 17R | 128D, 52R | 4D, 1R | Sam Nunn (D) | Paul Coverdell (R) | 7D, 4R | Clinton/ Gore (D) ✓ |
| 1994 | Zell Miller (D) | Pierre Howard (D) | Max Cleland (D) | Mike Bowers (R) (Note: Switched parties to Republican.) | Werner Rogers (D) | Tommy Irvin (D) | Tim Ryles (D) | David Poythress (D) | 39D, 17R | 128D, 52R | 4D, 1R | Sam Nunn (D) | Paul Coverdell (R) | 7D, 4R | Clinton/ Gore (D) ✓ |
| 1995 | Zell Miller (D) | Pierre Howard (D) | Max Cleland (D) | Mike Bowers (R) | Linda Schrenko (R) | Tommy Irvin (D) | John Oxendine (R) | David Poythress (D) | 36D, 20R | 114D, 66R | 3R, 2D | Sam Nunn (D) | Paul Coverdell (R) | 7R, 4D | Clinton/ Gore (D) ✓ |
| 1995 | Zell Miller (D) | Pierre Howard (D) | Max Cleland (D) | Mike Bowers (R) | Linda Schrenko (R) | Tommy Irvin (D) | John Oxendine (R) | David Poythress (D) | 36D, 20R | 114D, 66R | 3R, 2D | Sam Nunn (D) | Paul Coverdell (R) | 8R, 3D (Note: In April 1995 incumbent Democrat Nathan Deal switched parties to Republican.) | Clinton/ Gore (D) ✓ |
| 1996 | Zell Miller (D) | Pierre Howard (D) | Max Cleland (D) | Mike Bowers (R) | Linda Schrenko (R) | Tommy Irvin (D) | John Oxendine (R) | David Poythress (D) | 36D, 20R | 114D, 66R | 4R, 1D (Note: Democrat Bob Durden switched parties to Republican in 1995.) | Sam Nunn (D) | Paul Coverdell (R) | 8R, 3D | Dole/ Kemp (R) ✗ |
| 1997 | Zell Miller (D) | Pierre Howard (D) | Lewis A. Massey (D) | Mike Bowers (R) | Linda Schrenko (R) | Tommy Irvin (D) | John Oxendine (R) | David Poythress (D) | 34D, 22R | 102D, 78R | 4R, 1D | Max Cleland (D) | Paul Coverdell (R) | 8R, 3D | Dole/ Kemp (R) ✗ |
| 1997 | Zell Miller (D) | Pierre Howard (D) | Lewis A. Massey (D) | Thurbert Baker (D) | Linda Schrenko (R) | Tommy Irvin (D) | John Oxendine (R) | David Poythress (D) | 34D, 22R | 102D, 78R | 4R, 1D | Max Cleland (D) | Paul Coverdell (R) | 8R, 3D | Dole/ Kemp (R) ✗ |
| 1998 | Zell Miller (D) | Pierre Howard (D) | Lewis A. Massey (D) | Thurbert Baker (D) | Linda Schrenko (R) | Tommy Irvin (D) | John Oxendine (R) | David Poythress (D) | 34D, 22R | 102D, 78R | 4R, 1NP (Note: Governor Zell Miller appointed Lauren "Bubba" McDonald Jr. as a nonpartisan to the seat vacated by Democrat Mac Barber.) | Max Cleland (D) | Paul Coverdell (R) | 8R, 3D | Dole/ Kemp (R) ✗ |
| 1998 | Zell Miller (D) | Pierre Howard (D) | Lewis A. Massey (D) | Thurbert Baker (D) | Linda Schrenko (R) | Tommy Irvin (D) | John Oxendine (R) | Marti Fullerton (D) (Note: Served on an interim basis after Poythress resigned in order to run for governor.) | 34D, 22R | 102D, 78R | 4R, 1NP | Max Cleland (D) | Paul Coverdell (R) | 8R, 3D | Dole/ Kemp (R) ✗ |
| 1999 | Roy Barnes (D) | Mark Taylor (D) | Cathy Cox (D) | Thurbert Baker (D) | Linda Schrenko (R) | Tommy Irvin (D) | John Oxendine (R) | Mike Thurmond (D) | 34D, 22R | 102D, 78R | 4R, 1NP | Max Cleland (D) | Paul Coverdell (R) | 8R, 3D | Dole/ Kemp (R) ✗ |
| 2000 | Roy Barnes (D) | Mark Taylor (D) | Cathy Cox (D) | Thurbert Baker (D) | Linda Schrenko (R) | Tommy Irvin (D) | John Oxendine (R) | Mike Thurmond (D) | 34D, 22R | 102D, 78R | 4R, 1NP | Max Cleland (D) | Paul Coverdell (R) | 8R, 3D | Bush/ Cheney (R) ✓ |
| 2000 | Roy Barnes (D) | Mark Taylor (D) | Cathy Cox (D) | Thurbert Baker (D) | Linda Schrenko (R) | Tommy Irvin (D) | John Oxendine (R) | Mike Thurmond (D) | 34D, 22R | 102D, 78R | 4R, 1NP | Max Cleland (D) | Zell Miller (D) | 8R, 3D | Bush/ Cheney (R) ✓ |
| 2001 | Roy Barnes (D) | Mark Taylor (D) | Cathy Cox (D) | Thurbert Baker (D) | Linda Schrenko (R) | Tommy Irvin (D) | John Oxendine (R) | Mike Thurmond (D) | 32D, 24R | 105D, 74R, 1I | 3R, 1D, 1NP | Max Cleland (D) | Zell Miller (D) | 8R, 3D | Bush/ Cheney (R) ✓ |
| 2002 | Roy Barnes (D) | Mark Taylor (D) | Cathy Cox (D) | Thurbert Baker (D) | Linda Schrenko (R) | Tommy Irvin (D) | John Oxendine (R) | Mike Thurmond (D) | 32D, 24R | 105D, 74R, 1I | 3R, 1D, 1NP | Max Cleland (D) | Zell Miller (D) | 8R, 3D | Bush/ Cheney (R) ✓ |
| 2003 | Sonny Perdue (R) | Mark Taylor (D) | Cathy Cox (D) | Thurbert Baker (D) | Kathy Cox (R) (Note: Resigned.) | Tommy Irvin (D) | John Oxendine (R) | Mike Thurmond (D) | 30R, 26D (Note: Recently reelected incumbent Democrats Don Cheeks, Dan Lee, Rooney Bowen, and Jack Hill switched parties to Republican between the November 2002 election and the beginning of the legislative session in January 2003.) | 107D, 72R, 1I | 4R, 1D | Saxby Chambliss (R) | Zell Miller (D) | 8R, 5D | Bush/ Cheney (R) ✓ |
| 2004 | Sonny Perdue (R) | Mark Taylor (D) | Cathy Cox (D) | Thurbert Baker (D) | Kathy Cox (R) | Tommy Irvin (D) | John Oxendine (R) | Mike Thurmond (D) | 30R, 26D | 107D, 72R, 1I | 4R, 1D | Saxby Chambliss (R) | Zell Miller (D) | 8R, 5D | Bush/ Cheney (R) ✓ |
| 2005 | Sonny Perdue (R) | Mark Taylor (D) | Cathy Cox (D) | Thurbert Baker (D) | Kathy Cox (R) | Tommy Irvin (D) | John Oxendine (R) | Mike Thurmond (D) | 34R, 22D | 100R, 79D, 1I (Note: Recently reelected incumbent Democrat Chuck Sims switched parties to Republican between the November 2004 election and the beginning of the legislative session in January 2005.) | 4R, 1D | Saxby Chambliss (R) | Johnny Isakson (R) | 7R, 6D | Bush/ Cheney (R) ✓ |
| 2006 | Sonny Perdue (R) | Mark Taylor (D) | Cathy Cox (D) | Thurbert Baker (D) | Kathy Cox (R) | Tommy Irvin (D) | John Oxendine (R) | Mike Thurmond (D) | 34R, 22D | 101R, 78D, 1I (Note: Greg Morris switched from the Democratic to the Republican Party in August 2005.) | 4R, 1D | Saxby Chambliss (R) | Johnny Isakson (R) | 7R, 6D | Bush/ Cheney (R) ✓ |
| 2007 | Sonny Perdue (R) | Casey Cagle (R) | Karen Handel (R) (Note: Resigned to seek the Republican gubernatorial nomination.) | Thurbert Baker (D) | Kathy Cox (R) | Tommy Irvin (D) | John Oxendine (R) | Mike Thurmond (D) | 34R, 22D | 106R, 74D | 5R | Saxby Chambliss (R) | Johnny Isakson (R) | 7R, 6D | Bush/ Cheney (R) ✓ |
| 2008 | Sonny Perdue (R) | Casey Cagle (R) | Karen Handel (R) | Thurbert Baker (D) | Kathy Cox (R) | Tommy Irvin (D) | John Oxendine (R) | Mike Thurmond (D) | 34R, 22D | 106R, 74D | 5R | Saxby Chambliss (R) | Johnny Isakson (R) | 7R, 6D | McCain/ Palin (R) ✗ |
| 2009 | Sonny Perdue (R) | Casey Cagle (R) | Karen Handel (R) | Thurbert Baker (D) | Kathy Cox (R) | Tommy Irvin (D) | John Oxendine (R) | Mike Thurmond (D) | 34R, 22D | 105R, 75D | 5R | Saxby Chambliss (R) | Johnny Isakson (R) | 7R, 6D | McCain/ Palin (R) ✗ |
| 2010 | Sonny Perdue (R) | Casey Cagle (R) | Brian Kemp (R) (Note: Brian Kemp was appointed Secretary of State, January 4, 2010, to fill the unexpired term of Karen Handel.) | Thurbert Baker (D) | Brad Bryant (I) | Tommy Irvin (D) | John Oxendine (R) | Mike Thurmond (D) | 34R, 22D | 105R, 74D, 1I (Note: Bobby Parham resigned after the 2009 legislative session and was succeeded by independent Rusty Kidd.) | 5R | Saxby Chambliss (R) | Johnny Isakson (R) | 7R, 6D | McCain/ Palin (R) ✗ |
| 2011 | Nathan Deal (R) | Casey Cagle (R) | Brian Kemp (R) | Sam Olens (R) | John Barge (R) | Gary Black (R) | Ralph Hudgens (R) | Mark Butler (R) | 36R, 20D (Note: Tim Golden switched from the Democratic to the Republican Party after the November 2, 2010 General Election.) | 116R, 63D, 1I (Note: Eight state representatives—C. Ellis Black, Amy Carter, Mike Cheokas, Bubber Epps, Gerald Greene, Bob Hanner, Doug McKillip, and Alan Powell—switched from the Democratic to the Republican Party after the November 2, 2010 General Election.) | 5R | Saxby Chambliss (R) | Johnny Isakson (R) | 8R, 5D | McCain/ Palin (R) ✗ |
| 2012 | Nathan Deal (R) | Casey Cagle (R) | Brian Kemp (R) | Sam Olens (R) | John Barge (R) | Gary Black (R) | Ralph Hudgens (R) | Mark Butler (R) | 36R, 20D | 116R, 63D, 1I | 5R | Saxby Chambliss (R) | Johnny Isakson (R) | 8R, 5D | Romney/ Ryan (R) ✗ |
| 2013 | Nathan Deal (R) | Casey Cagle (R) | Brian Kemp (R) | Sam Olens (R) | John Barge (R) | Gary Black (R) | Ralph Hudgens (R) | Mark Butler (R) | 38R, 18D | 119R, 60D, 1I | 5R | Saxby Chambliss (R) | Johnny Isakson (R) | 9R, 5D | Romney/ Ryan (R) ✗ |
| 2014 | Nathan Deal (R) | Casey Cagle (R) | Brian Kemp (R) | Sam Olens (R) | John Barge (R) | Gary Black (R) | Ralph Hudgens (R) | Mark Butler (R) | 38R, 18D | 119R, 60D, 1I | 5R | Saxby Chambliss (R) | Johnny Isakson (R) | 9R, 5D | Romney/ Ryan (R) ✗ |
| 2015 | Nathan Deal (R) | Casey Cagle (R) | Brian Kemp (R) | Sam Olens (R) | Richard Woods (R) | Gary Black (R) | Ralph Hudgens (R) | Mark Butler (R) | 38R, 18D | 119R, 60D, 1I | 5R | David Perdue (R) | Johnny Isakson (R) | 10R, 4D | Romney/ Ryan (R) ✗ |
| 2016 | Nathan Deal (R) | Casey Cagle (R) | Brian Kemp (R) | Sam Olens (R) | Richard Woods (R) | Gary Black (R) | Ralph Hudgens (R) | Mark Butler (R) | 39R, 17D (Note: JaNice Van Ness won a special election to succeed Ronald Ramsey Sr., flipping the seat from Democratic to Republican.) | 119R, 60D, 1I | 5R | David Perdue (R) | Johnny Isakson (R) | 10R, 4D | Trump/ Pence (R) ✓ |
| 2017 | Nathan Deal (R) | Casey Cagle (R) | Brian Kemp (R) | Chris Carr (R) | Richard Woods (R) | Gary Black (R) | Ralph Hudgens (R) | Mark Butler (R) | 38R, 18D | 118R, 62D | 5R | David Perdue (R) | Johnny Isakson (R) | 10R, 4D | Trump/ Pence (R) ✓ |
| 2018 | Nathan Deal (R) | Casey Cagle (R) | Brian Kemp (R) | Chris Carr (R) | Richard Woods (R) | Gary Black (R) | Ralph Hudgens (R) | Mark Butler (R) | 38R, 18D | 118R, 62D | 5R | David Perdue (R) | Johnny Isakson (R) | 10R, 4D | Trump/ Pence (R) ✓ |
| 2019 | Brian Kemp (R) | Geoff Duncan (R) | Brad Raffensperger (R) | Chris Carr (R) | Richard Woods (R) | Gary Black (R) | Jim Beck (R) (Note: Suspended following indictment for fraud.) | Mark Butler (R) | 35R, 21D | 106R, 74D | 5R | David Perdue (R) | Johnny Isakson (R) | 9R, 5D | Trump/ Pence (R) ✓ |
| 2019 | Brian Kemp (R) | Geoff Duncan (R) | Brad Raffensperger (R) | Chris Carr (R) | Richard Woods (R) | Gary Black (R) | John F. King (R) (Note: Temporary appointment pending the outcome of the investigation into Jim Beck.) | Mark Butler (R) | 35R, 21D | 106R, 74D | 5R | David Perdue (R) | Johnny Isakson (R) | 9R, 5D | Trump/ Pence (R) ✓ |
| 2020 | Brian Kemp (R) | Geoff Duncan (R) | Brad Raffensperger (R) | Chris Carr (R) | Richard Woods (R) | Gary Black (R) | John F. King (R) | Mark Butler (R) | 35R, 21D | 106R, 74D | 5R | David Perdue (R) | Kelly Loeffler (R) | 9R, 5D | Biden/ Harris (D) ✓ |
| 2021 | Brian Kemp (R) | Geoff Duncan (R) | Brad Raffensperger (R) | Chris Carr (R) | Richard Woods (R) | Gary Black (R) | John F. King (R) | Mark Butler (R) | 34R, 22D | 103R, 77D | 5R | Jon Ossoff (D) | Raphael Warnock (D) | 8R, 6D | Biden/ Harris (D) ✓ |
| 2022 | Brian Kemp (R) | Geoff Duncan (R) | Brad Raffensperger (R) | Chris Carr (R) | Richard Woods (R) | Gary Black (R) | John F. King (R) | Mark Butler (R) | 34R, 22D | 103R, 77D | 5R | Jon Ossoff (D) | Raphael Warnock (D) | 8R, 6D | Biden/ Harris (D) ✓ |
| 2023 | Brian Kemp (R) | Burt Jones (R) | Brad Raffensperger (R) | Chris Carr (R) | Richard Woods (R) | Tyler Harper (R) | John F. King (R) | Bruce Thompson (R) | 33R, 23D | 101R, 79D | 5R | Jon Ossoff (D) | Raphael Warnock (D) | 9R, 5D | Biden/ Harris (D) ✓ |
| 2024 | Brian Kemp (R) | Burt Jones (R) | Brad Raffensperger (R) | Chris Carr (R) | Richard Woods (R) | Tyler Harper (R) | John F. King (R) | Bruce Thompson (R) | 33R, 23D | 102R, 78D (Note: Mesha Mainor switched from the Democratic to the Republican Party in July 2023.) | 5R | Jon Ossoff (D) | Raphael Warnock (D) | 9R, 5D | Trump/ Vance (R) ✓ |
| 2025 | Brian Kemp (R) | Burt Jones (R) | Brad Raffensperger (R) | Chris Carr (R) | Richard Woods (R) | Tyler Harper (R) | John F. King (R) | Bárbara Rivera Holmes (R) (Note: Appointed Labor Commissioner in 2025 to fill the unexpired term of Bruce Thompson, who died in office.) | 33R, 23D | 100R, 80D | 5R | Jon Ossoff (D) | Raphael Warnock (D) | 9R, 5D | Trump/ Vance (R) ✓ |
| 2026 | Brian Kemp (R) | Burt Jones (R) | Brad Raffensperger (R) | Chris Carr (R) | Richard Woods (R) | Tyler Harper (R) | John F. King (R) | Bárbara Rivera Holmes (R) | 33R, 23D | 99R, 81D | 3R, 2D | Jon Ossoff (D) | Raphael Warnock (D) | 9R, 5D | Trump/ Vance (R) ✓ |
| 2027 | Keisha Lance Bottoms (D) | Josh McLaurin (D) | Penny Brown Reynolds (D) | Tanya Miller (D) | Lydia Powell (D) | Katherine Juhan-Arnold (D) | Keisha Waites (D) | Nikki Porcher (D) | 29R, 27D | 92D, 88R | 3D, 2R | Jon Ossoff (D) | Raphael Warnock (D) | 9R, 5D | Trump/ Vance (R) ✓ |

Key to party colors and abbreviations for members of the U.S. Congress and other politicians or officials
| Alaskan Independence (AKIP) Know Nothing (KN) American Labor (AL) Anti-Jacksonian (Anti-J); National Republican (NR) Anti-Administration (AA) Anti-Masonic (Anti-M) Conservative (Con) Covenant (Cov) | Democratic (D) Democratic–Farmer–Labor (DFL) Democratic–NPL (D-NPL) Dixiecrat (Dix), States' Rights (SR) Democratic-Republican (DR) Farmer–Labor (FL) Federalist (F); Pro-Administration (PA) | Free Soil (FS) Fusion (Fus) Greenback (GB) Independence (IPM) Jacksonian (J) Liberal (Lib) Libertarian (L) National Union (NU) | Nonpartisan League (NPL) Nullifier (N) Opposition Northern (O); Opposition Southern (O) Populist (Pop) Progressive (Prog) Prohibition (Proh) Readjuster (Rea) | Republican (R) Silver (Sv) Silver Republican (SvR) Socialist (Soc) Union (U) Unconditional Union (UU) Vermont Progressive (VP) Whig (W) | Independent (I) Nonpartisan (NP) |

== See also ==
- Politics in Georgia
- Politics of Georgia
