= 2026 Georgia State Superintendent of Schools election =

- November 3, 2026

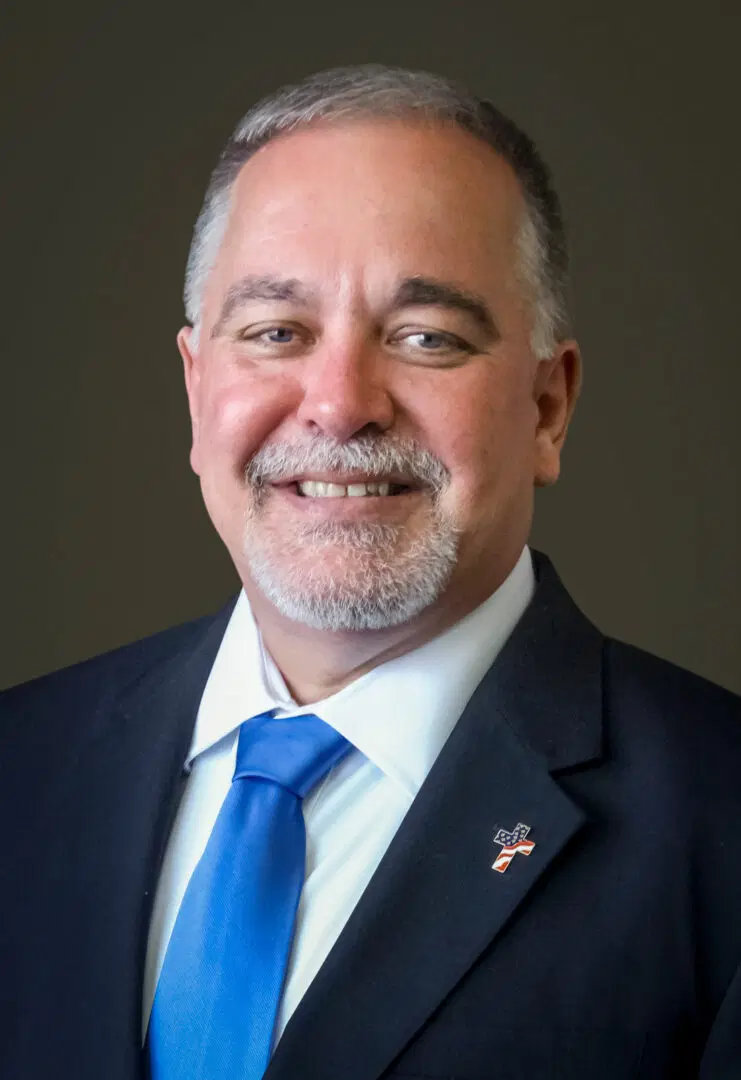
Candidate	Lydia Powell	Richard Woods
Party	Democratic	Republican
Popular vote	2,275,556	1,890,226
Percentage	54.62%	45.38%
- Powell: 50–60% 60–70% 70–80% 80–90% Woods: 50–60% 60–70% 70–80% 80–90% 90–100% Tie: 50%
Superintendent before election
Richard Woods
Republican
Elected Superintendent
Lydia Powell
Democratic

The 2026 Georgia State Superintendent of Schools election was held on November 3, 2026, to elect the Georgia Superintendent of Schools. Primary elections were held on May 19, and primary runoff elections were held on June 16. Three-term incumbent Republican superintendent Richard Woods ran for re-election. In the November 3, 2026 general election, Woods lost his bid for a fourth term to Democratic challenger Lydia Powell.

== Republican primary ==
=== Candidates ===
==== Nominee ====
- Richard Woods, incumbent superintendent

==== Eliminated in runoff ====
- Bubba Longgrear, superintendent of Candler County

==== Eliminated in primary ====
- Nelva Lee, business owner
- Mesha Mainor, former state representative from the 56th district (2021–2025) (Note: Initially elected as a Democrat, defecting in 2023)
- Randell Trammell, business executive

=== Results ===
Primary results by county: Woods: 30–40%; 40–50%; 50–60%; 60–70%; 70–80%; Longgrear: 40–50%; 50–60%; 70–80%; 80–90%

Republican primary
Party	Candidate	Votes	%
Republican	Richard Woods (incumbent)	428,895	49.9
Republican	Bubba Longgrear	250,208	29.1
Republican	Randell Trammell	121,064	14.1
Republican	Mesha Mainor	35,040	4.1
Republican	Nelva Lee	24,643	2.9
Total votes		859,850	100.0

=== Runoff ===
==== Results ====
Runoff results by county: Woods: 50–60%; 60–70%; 70–80%; Longgrear: 50–60%; 60–70%; 70–80%; 80–90%

Republican primary runoff
Party	Candidate	Votes	%
Republican	Richard Woods (incumbent)	344,958	51.5
Republican	Bubba Longgrear	325,029	48.5
Total votes		669,997	100.0

== Democratic primary ==
=== Candidates ===
==== Nominee ====
- Lydia Catalina Powell, educator

==== Eliminated in primary ====
- Anton Anthony, Hancock County school superintendent
- Otha Thornton, nominee for superintendent in 2018

==== Endorsements ====
Anton Anthony

Organizations

- Georgia Association of Educators

=== Results ===
Primary results by county: Powelll: 30–40%; 40–50%; 50–60%; 60–70%; Anthony: 40–50%; 50–60%; 70–80%; Thornton: 70–80%

Democratic primary
Party	Candidate	Votes	%
Democratic	Lydia Catalina Powell	511,811	50.5
Democratic	Anton Anthony	302,219	29.8
Democratic	Otha Thornton	199,815	19.7
Total votes		1,013,845	100.0

== General election ==
=== Candidates ===
- Lydia Catalina Powell, educator
- Richard Woods, incumbent superintendent

=== Results ===
2026 Georgia State Superintendent of Schools election results
Party	Candidate	Votes	%	±%
Democratic	Lydia Powell	2,275,556	54.62	+8.81
Republican	Richard Woods (incumbent)	1,890,226	45.38	−8.81
Total votes		4,165,782	100.00	

Counties that flipped from Republican to Democratic

- Baldwin (largest city: Milledgeville)
- Burke (largest city: Waynesboro)
- Clay (largest city: Fort Gaines)
- Fayette (largest city: Peachtree City)
- Houston (largest city: Warner Robins)
- Jefferson (largest city: Louisville)
- Peach (largest city: Fort Valley)
- Sumter (largest city: Americus)
- Terrell (largest city: Dawson)
- Warren (largest city: Warrenton)
- Washington (largest city: Sandersville)

Counties that flipped from Republican to Tied

- Chattahoochee (largest city: Cusseta)
