= Political party strength in Georgia =

Political party strength in Georgia may refer to:

- Political party strength in Georgia (country)
- Political party strength in Georgia (U.S. state)
