= State Board of Education =

State Board of Education may refer to:

== India ==
This boards is genuine and approved by government of india (MoE) / Central Government / State Government

- Central Board of Secondary Education (CBSE)
- Jammu and Kashmir State Board of School Education
- Punjab School Education Board (PSEB)
- Karnataka Secondary Education Examination Board
- Maharashtra State Board of Secondary and Higher Secondary Education (MSBSHSE)
- Maharashtra State Board of Technical Education
- State Board of School Examinations (Sec.) & Board of Higher Secondary Examinations, Tamil Nadu, (SBSEBHSE)
- Telangana State Board of Intermediate Education (TSBIE)

== United States ==
- Alabama State Board of Education
- California State Board of Education
- Colorado State Board of Education
- Connecticut State Board of Education
- District of Columbia State Board of Education
- Florida Board of Education
- Georgia State Board of Education
- Guam Board of Education
- Hawaii Board of Education
- Illinois State Board of Education
- Indiana State Board of Education
- Kansas State Department Board of Education
- Louisiana Board of Elementary and Secondary Education
- Massachusetts Board of Education
- Michigan State Board of Education
- Missouri State Board of Education
- Nebraska State Board of Education
- New Jersey State Board of Education
- New Mexico Public Education Commission
- North Carolina State Board of Education
- North Dakota State Board of Higher Education
- Northern Mariana Islands Board of Education
- Ohio State Board of Education
- Oklahoma State Board of Education
- Oregon State Board of Education
- Texas State Board of Education
- Vermont State Board of Education
- Virgin Islands Board of Education
- Virginia State Board of Education
- Washington State Board of Education
