= John Randolph Lewis =

American dentist, soldier, administrator, and postmaster

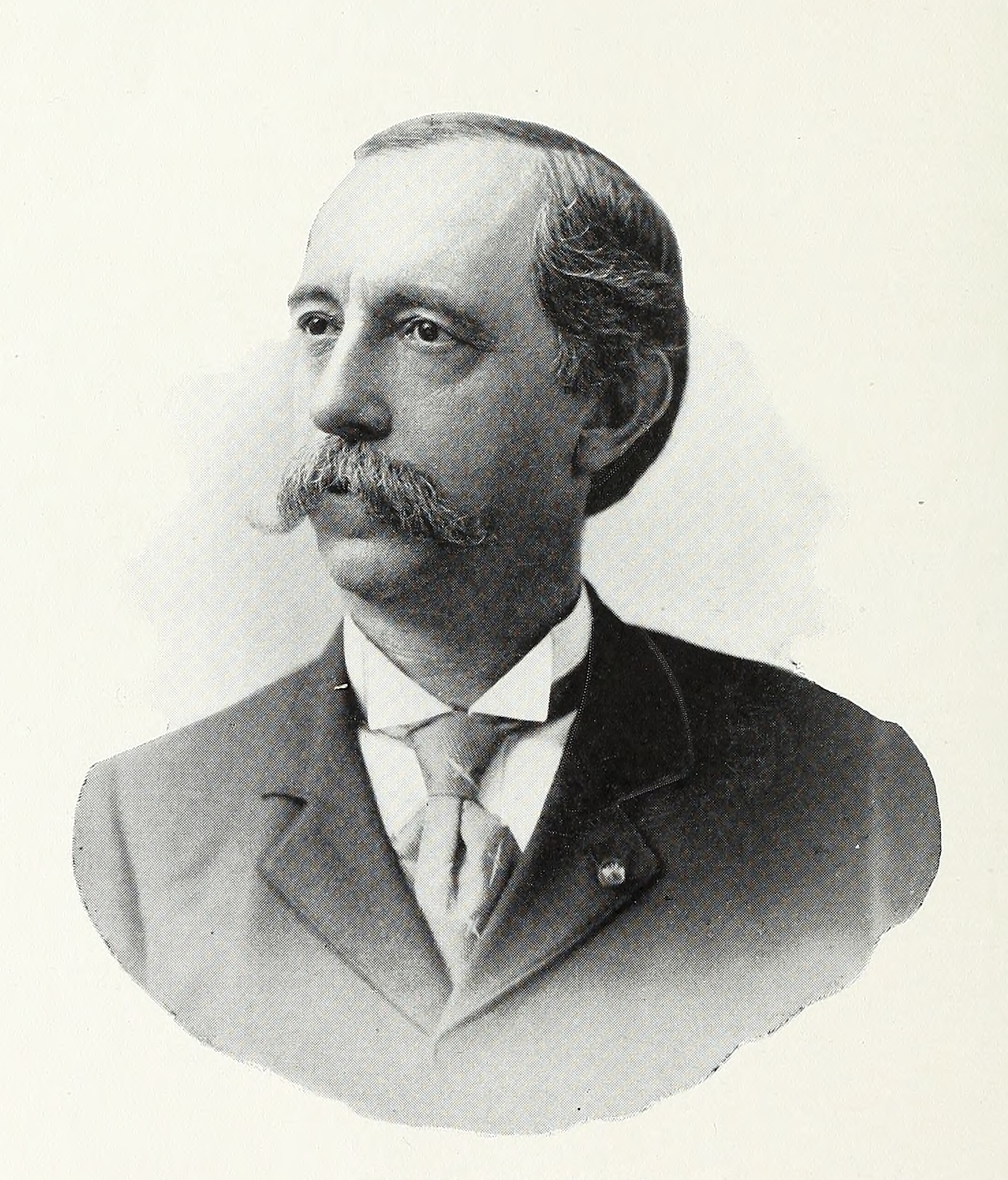
- Born: September 22, 1834; Edinboro, Pennsylvania, U.S.
- Died: February 8, 1900 (aged 65); Chicago, Illinois, U.S.
- Resting place: Arlington National Cemetery
- Education: Pennsylvania College of Dental Surgery; University of Vermont
- Occupations: Dentist; soldier; administrator; postmaster
- Military career
- Allegiance: United States
- Branch: Union Army
- Service years: 1861–1865
- Rank: Brevet Brigadier General
- Units: 1st Vermont Volunteer Infantry Regiment; 5th Vermont Volunteer Infantry Regiment; Veteran Reserve Corps
- Conflicts: American Civil War

Brigadier-General John Randolph Lewis (September 22, 1834 – February 8, 1900) was an American dentist, soldier, administrator, and postmaster, known for his work with the Freedmen's Bureau.

== Early life ==
Lewis was born in Edinboro, Pennsylvania. He left home when he was 15 and moved to Buffalo, New York, where he studied dentistry with his uncle John Lewis; there, in 1856, he married Frances Helen Mattice.

He also studied at the Pennsylvania College of Dental Surgery, graduating with a DDS in 1858. He and his wife later moved to Burlington, Vermont, where he earned an MD from the University of Vermont, and continued to practice dentistry until the outbreak of the American Civil War.

== Civil War ==
On April 20, 1861, Lewis enlisted in the Union Army, joining the 1st Vermont Volunteer Infantry Regiment as a private in Company H. He fought in the Battle of Big Bethel in June 1861.

In September 1861, he joined the 5th Vermont Volunteer Infantry Regiment as a captain in Company I. In July 1862, he was promoted to Major; and in October 1862, he was promoted to Lieutenant Colonel.

During the Battle of White Oak Swamp in June 1862, Lewis was struck in the right leg by a fragment of an artillery shell. He later participated in all the 5th Regiment's battles with the exception of Mine Run and Antietam until May 1864, when his left arm was amputated at the shoulder as a result of injuries he suffered during the first day of the Battle of the Wilderness. He was then transported to Fredericksburg, and then Buffalo, where his wife tended him during his convalescence. In September 1864, he was honorably discharged, and joined the Veteran Reserve Corps (VRC) as a colonel; in March 1865, he was promoted to brigadier general.

Lewis served on the VRC's examining board until the war's end in June 1865, "inspecting men in hospitals" to ascertain whether they were injured too badly to return to duty.

== Post-war years ==
After the war ended, Lewis transferred to Elmira Prison, where he relieved Benjamin F. Tracy as Post Commander, and "paroled and sent home all the prisoners". In December 1865 he was sent to Nashville, where he served as staff inspector-general (or assistant inspector-general) for Clinton Fisk.

After "about six months" in this position, Lewis relieved Fisk as assistant commissioner for the Tennessee Freedmen's Bureau, a position he retained until January 1867, when Oliver Otis Howard reassigned him to Georgia; there, he was staff inspector-general for Caleb C. Sibley, assistant commissioner of the Georgia Bureau.

In March 1867, Lewis mustered out of the Army; later that year, he was appointed a major in the 44th Infantry Regiment "at the personal request" of Ulysses S. Grant, who "was aware that Lewis's amputation" would prevent him from practicing dentistry. In October 1868, Sibley retired, and Lewis replaced him as assistant commissioner. The Bureau's dwindling influence — "by January, 1869, [Lewis] supervised only nine officials" — led Lewis to place increased value on setting up an education system for newly emancipated people.

In April 1870, Lewis retired from the military, now a colonel; Rufus Bullock subsequently asked him to become Georgia's first State School Superintendent, a position to which he was confirmed by the Georgia State Senate. Lewis established the public school system, but conflicts with the Georgia State Legislature — and his association with the intensely unpopular Bullock, who under threat of violence was forced to resign the governorship and flee the state — led him to retire after two years.

In 1873, he left Georgia for Iowa, where he went into business with Lewis A. Grant; in 1876, however, he "returned East", and in 1880 settled again in Georgia. Historian Paul A. Cimbala notes that Lewis was more accepted by the people of Atlanta at this point, as he had "different priorities": namely, "business and boosterism, not blacks". This increased popularity led to his filling several civic roles, including assistant secretary of the 1881 International Cotton Exposition and secretary of the 1895 Cotton States and International Exposition; as well, he was named Postmaster of Atlanta in 1889 or 1890, a position he held for four years. Cimbala further observes that, following Lewis's death in Chicago, the Atlanta Constitution published an obituary that detailed Lewis's military record and activities with veterans' organizations, but omitted all mention of the Freedmen's Bureau, stating only that Lewis "came to Georgia to reside".
