= Lydia Powell =

American educator and politician (born 1976)

Georgia Superintendent-elect of Schools
- Assuming office January 2027
- Governor: Keisha Lance Bottoms (elect)
- Succeeding: Richard Woods

Personal details
- Born: Lydia Catalina Powell; May 27, 1976 (age 50) Queens, New York, U.S.
- Party: Democratic
- Education: Florida A&M University; University of Sarasota; Florida State University

Lydia Catalina Powell (born May 27, 1976) is an American educator and politician serving as the Georgia Superintendent-elect of Schools. She was previously an assistant principal of Hampton High School in Henry County, Georgia, owner of the diversity consulting company Powell and Associates, and adjunct professor of educational leadership at Thomas University.

== Early life and education ==
Powell was born on May 27, 1976 in Queens, New York. She graduated from Northwest High School. She earned a B.A. in political science education with a minor in Spanish from Florida A&M University in 1998. Powell earned a doctorate in educational leadership from the University of Sarasota in 2008. She is a member of Delta Sigma Theta. In 2021, Powell completed a M.S. in emotional disturbances and learning disabilities at Florida State University.

== Career ==
Powell was a social studies teacher in Lee County, Florida where she also coached cheer and step team. Powell moved to Georgia and worked as a social studies teacher, administrator, and culture inclusion trainer. She has served as an adjunct professor of educational leadership at Thomas University. She owns Powell and Associates, a diversity consulting company. As of 2026, Powell was an assistant principal of Hampton High School in Henry County, Georgia.

During the 2026 Georgia State Superintendent of Schools election, Powell won a three-candidate Democratic primary with 50.5 percent of the vote. Powell won the general election, defeating incumbent Richard Woods. She campaigned on universal preschool, less reliance on standardized testing, and strengthening student support in rural Georgia. Specifically, she advocates for improving partnerships with school resource officers, social services, the Georgia Department of Family and Children Services.

== See also ==
- List of African-American statewide elected officials
- Timeline of African-American firsts

Political offices
Preceded by Richard Woods	Georgia State Superintendent of Schools; Assuming office 2027	Elect
Party political offices
Preceded by Alisha Thomas Searcy	Democratic nominee for Georgia State Superintendent of Schools; 2026	Most recent
