= William Bradley Bryant =

American lawyer

Brad Bryant

Georgia Superintendent of Schools
- In office July 2010 – Jan. 2011
- Governor: Sonny Perdue
- Preceded by: Kathy Cox
- Succeeded by: John Barge

Personal details
- Party: Republican
- Profession: Attorney

William Bradley "Brad" Bryant was appointed superintendent of public schools for the U.S. state of Georgia by Gov. Sonny Perdue in 2010, filling the vacancy left by the resignation of Kathy Cox. He considered a bid to run for superintendent as an independent in the 2010 election (filing for partisan primaries had passed before his appointment), but he failed to collect enough valid petition signatures to win a place on the general election ballot.

From 2003 until his appointment as superintendent, Bryant served as a member of the state Board of Education. Previously, he had served on the DeKalb County Board of Education for twelve years, including seven years as its Chair.

Bryant holds a Bachelor’s from Presbyterian College in South Carolina, a Masters in Business Administration from the University of Georgia and a Juris Doctor from Mercer University.
