= John Barge =

American politician in Georgia

John David Barge

Georgia Superintendent of Schools
- In office January 10, 2011 – January 12, 2015
- Governor: Nathan Deal
- Preceded by: William Bradley Bryant
- Succeeded by: Richard Woods

Personal details
- Born: September 19, 1966 (age 59) Smyrna, Georgia
- Party: Republican
- Spouse: Loraine
- Children: 1
- Education: Berry College (BA); University of West Georgia (MA, EdS); University of Georgia (EdD)

John David Barge (born September 19, 1966) is the former superintendent of schools for the U.S. state of Georgia, serving from January 10, 2011 to January 12, 2015.

== Early life ==
Barge was born on September 19, 1966 in Smyrna, Georgia to Leland Jerry Barge (1939–1985) and Norma Rowland (1939–2013). He also had a stepfather named Homer "Billy" Watts (1937–2015). He was the youngest of five children. Barge graduated from Berry College in Rome, Georgia, with a bachelor's degree, from the University of West Georgia with master's and specialist's degrees, and from the University of Georgia with a doctorate in educational leadership.

== Career ==
His career in education includes roles as a high school and middle school teacher, assistant principal, and principal. He also served as the state director of career, technical, and agriculture education for the Georgia Department of Education. Prior to being elected state school superintendent, Barge served as the director of secondary curriculum and instruction with the Bartow County School System. He later became the superintendent of schools for the U.S. state of Georgia from January 10, 2011 to January 12, 2015.

He was a candidate for Governor of Georgia in the 2014 election, finishing third in the Republican primary with 11.5% of the vote. In 2020, Barge ran for the United States House of Representatives in Georgia's 14th congressional district, but was defeated in the Republican primary held on June 9, 2020.

Since 2024, Barge serves as the headmaster of Unity Christian School in Rome, Georgia.

== Personal life ==
Barge has been married to Loraine since 1992 and has one daughter. In 2009, his wife was diagnosed with breast cancer. Later, in 2012, his wife was diagnosed with Non-Hodgkin lymphoma. She survived both.

Party political offices
Preceded by Kathy Cox	Republican nominee for Georgia Superintendent of Schools; 2010	Succeeded by Richard Woods
Political offices
Preceded by William Bradley Bryant	Georgia Superintendent of Schools; 2011–2015	Succeeded by Richard Woods
