= Linda Schrenko =

American politician (born 1949)

Georgia Superintendent of Schools
- In office 1995–2003
- Governor: Zell Miller; Roy Barnes
- Preceded by: Werner Rogers
- Succeeded by: Kathy Cox

Personal details
- Born: July 24, 1949 (age 77)

Linda Schrenko is a former superintendent of schools in the U.S. state of Georgia who was convicted on an embezzlement scheme and sentenced to 8 years in federal prison.

== Biography ==
Schrenko was born on July 24, 1949, in Millen, Georgia. She received a bachelor's degree in education from Augusta College in 1972, after which she worked as a teacher and in other educational jobs until her election as superintendent.

== As superintendent ==
In 1994, Schrenko, a Republican, defeated the Democratic incumbent to be elected as Superintendent of Schools, becoming the first woman, and first Republican elected to statewide office in Georgia. She was re-elected in 1998.

During her tenure, she generated controversy by advocating the teaching of creationism in schools and so was often in conflict with Governor Roy Barnes. She also came under harsh criticism for creating the Georgia Criterion Referenced Competency Test.

== Campaign for governor ==
In 2002, Schrenko sought the Republican nomination for governor of Georgia against Bill Byrne and Sonny Perdue. Schrenko and Byrne were defeated by Perdue, who avoided a runoff by claiming a majority of the primary votes.

== Criminal conviction ==
The 2002 gubernatorial race would lead to Schrenko's downfall. She stole $600,000 in federal funds set aside for educational services for deaf children and those in the governor's honors programs. With the help of her deputy, campaign manager and lover Merle Temple, Schrenko funneled the money into her campaign.

On November 10, 2004, Schrenko was indicted by a federal grand jury on charges stemming from the 2002 embezzlement. The indictment alleged that a substantial portion of the funds in question had been used to fund Schrenko's campaign for governor and facial plastic surgery.

She pleaded guilty to fraud and money laundering, and was sentenced to eight years in prison on July 12, 2006. She was also fined $414,000 in restitution and was required to serve three years' probation and 100 hours of community service upon being released. Schrenko was released from federal prison on March 6, 2013.

Party political offices
First	Republican nominee for Georgia Superintendent of Schools; 1994, 1998	Succeeded by Kathy Cox
