= Kathy Cox (American politician) =

American politician (born 1964)

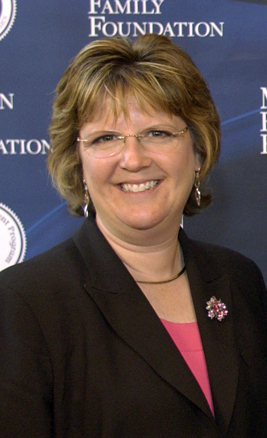

Member of the Georgia House of Representatives from the 105th district
- In office January 3, 1999 – January 3, 2003
- Preceded by: Dan Lakly
- Succeeded by: David E. Lucas, Sr.

Georgia Superintendent of Schools
- In office January 13, 2003 – June 30, 2010
- Governor: Sonny Perdue
- Preceded by: Linda Schrenko
- Succeeded by: Brad Bryant

Personal details
- Born: August 10, 1964 (age 62) Plainfield, New Jersey, U.S.
- Party: Republican
- Occupation: Educator, politician

Kathy Cox (born August 10, 1964) is a former superintendent of public schools for the U.S. state of Georgia and is a Republican. A high school teacher by occupation, Cox also served two terms, from 1998 to 2002, in the Georgia House of Representatives, representing Peachtree City, Georgia, prior to her election as superintendent in 2002. Cox sought re-election in 2006, defeating Democratic challenger Denise Majette (a former U.S. representative), earning almost 60 percent of the vote.

Cox is not related to Cathy Cox, a Democrat who was Georgia's elected secretary of state from 1999 until 2007. The similarity in names became the subject of mostly humorous news stories in 2002, when Kathy Cox's defeated opponent, Barbara Christmas, complained that she had lost because of voter confusion between the two Coxes.

On September 5, 2008, Cox made history for an American television game show Are You Smarter than a 5th Grader? to win the $1,000,000 top prize (and the first to win according to the sequence in which the shows were broadcast). Cox was given the final question: "Who was the longest reigning British monarch?", to which she correctly answered Queen Victoria. (Note: At the time of Cox's appearance on Are You Smarter than a 5th Grader, Queen Victoria was the longest-reigning British monarch. Her record was surpassed by Queen Elizabeth II in 2015.) Cox intended to donate all her winnings to three schools in Georgia: Georgia Academy for the Blind in Macon, Atlanta Area School for the Deaf in Clarkston, and Georgia School for the Deaf in Cave Spring. All three schools are under the auspices of the Georgia Board of Education. These plans were affected by her personal bankruptcy in late 2008.

In May 2010, she announced her resignation effective July 1, 2010 in order to take a position as CEO of a new non-profit U.S. Education Delivery Institute in Washington D.C. She did not seek a third term in office. Georgia Governor Sonny Perdue appointed Brad Bryant as the interim State School Superintendent until a replacement (John Barge, a Republican) was elected in November 2010.

In 2018, Cox resumed her teaching career, teaching U.S. History at Eagle's Landing High School in Henry County, Georgia.

== Evolution controversy ==
In 2004, Cox proposed striking the word "evolution" from Georgia textbooks and replacing it with the phrase "biological changes over time." In justifying her decision, she claimed evolution was a buzzword that created problems for teachers in conservative and rural areas, and that she had not been attempting to water down the subject matter. Among those criticizing the proposal were former President Jimmy Carter–a Georgia resident, a Democrat and a well-known Baptist–saying he was "..embarrassed by Superintendent Kathy Cox's attempt to censor and distort the education of Georgia's students... there can be no incompatibility between Christian faith and proven facts concerning geology, biology, and astronomy."

== Personal bankruptcy ==
On November 17, 2008, Cox and her husband declared Chapter 7 bankruptcy due to the failure of her husband's home construction business, listing $3.5 million in debt and $650,000 in assets. The bankruptcy also affected the money won for the schools on Are You Smarter than a 5th Grader? Fidelity Investments, the investor charged in creating a fund for the donor schools, donated the winnings back to Fox in December 2008 from the schools, placing the prize in a limbo that would not benefit anyone.

On August 19, 2009, protesters representing deaf and blind children picketed the office of bankruptcy attorney Gary W. Brown in Newnan, over his efforts to take control of the winnings. According to Brown, the winnings belong to the bankruptcy estate, and should be used to pay back creditors.

In October 2010, U.S. Bankruptcy Judge W. Homer Drake signed off on an agreement to split the $1 million winnings into two equal parts: one half for creditors and the other half for the three state-run schools for the blind and deaf.

== Note ==
Party political offices
Preceded by Linda Schrenko	Republican nominee for Georgia Superintendent of Schools; 2002, 2006	Succeeded by John Barge
