= Georgia State Board of Education =

The Georgia State Board of Education (SBOE), alongside the Georgia State School Superintendent, oversees the Georgia Department of Education. Established by Article VIII, Section II of the Georgia State Constitution, the SBOE consists of fifteen members, fourteen of whom are appointed by the Governor of Georgia. Its statutory responsibilities are to provide all children in Georgia with a high-quality education and to ensure the efficient operation of the public school system. To those ends, the SBOE evaluates local school board decisions, oversees the Quality Basic Education (QBE) Fund, and promulgates state-wide rules related to curriculum, teacher certification, and school board governance.

== Background ==
Prior to the passage of Article VIII of the Georgia State Constitution in 1983, members of the SBOE were elected. Now, with State Senate approval, the Governor appoints one member from each of Georgia's fourteen Congressional districts to serve a seven-year term. Georgia's Teacher of the Year serves for one year ex officio, but they do not have voting power. All fifteen members, in addition to the Georgia State School Superintendent, meet regularly in the offices of the Georgia Department of Education in Atlanta, Georgia.

One of the SBOE's institutional responsibilities is to review appeals of local school board decisions. Typically, these cases relate to student discipline or the termination of personnel. Title 20 of the Georgia Code lays out the process for appealing a case to the SBOE, beginning with a written request submitted to the district's local school superintendent within 30 days of receiving a decision. Each decision is written and published on the Georgia Department of Education's website.

== Criticism ==
The Georgia State Board of Education has been criticized for its policies related to critical race theory (CRT) in schools. On June 3, 2021, the SBOE passed a resolution to deny private and federal funding to schools that teach students about systemic racism. The resolution also requires social science curriculum to treat racism and slavery as betrayals of the U.S.'s founding principles. Although the resolution does not explicitly mention critical race theory, the SBOE developed the statement in support of Governor Brian Kemp's opposition to CRT in K-12 classrooms.

Various advocacy groups, including the ACLU, view the resolution as an attempt to censor discussions about racism in classrooms. Likewise, the three dissenting SBOE members argue that the statement denies the existence of racism by declaring that Georgia is not a racist state. In response to this criticism, proponents of the resolution point to its emphasis on sharing multiple perspectives. Rather than restricting discussions, they argue, the resolution ensures that social science curriculum is unbiased.
