= Richard Woods (politician) =

American politician and educator

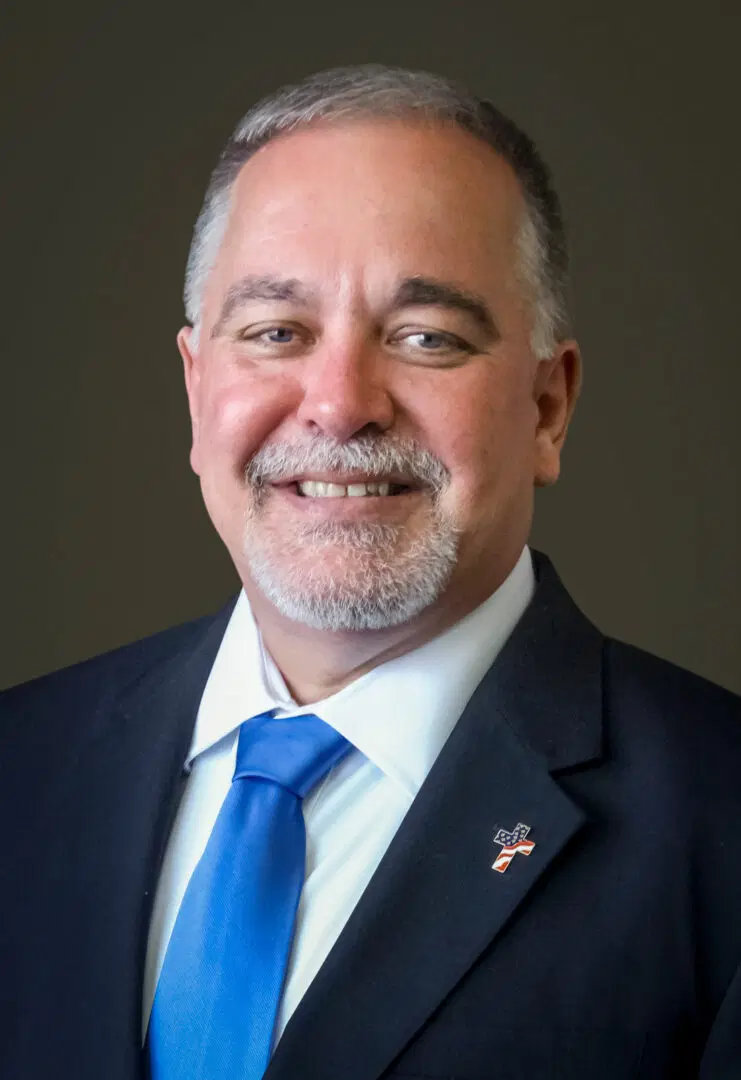

Georgia Superintendent of Schools
- Incumbent
- Assumed office January 12, 2015
- Governor: Nathan Deal; Brian Kemp
- Preceded by: John Barge

Personal details
- Born: Pensacola, Florida, U.S.
- Party: Republican
- Spouse: Lisha
- Education: Kennesaw State University (BA); Valdosta State University (MA)
- Website: Office website Campaign website

Richard Woods is an American politician and educator who is currently the Georgia Superintendent of Schools, a position he was elected to in 2014. He was reelected to his position in 2018, defeating his Democratic opponent Otha Thornton with slightly over 53% of the vote. Woods received his bachelor's degree from Kennesaw State University and his master's degree from Valdosta State University. His career in education has spanned over twenty-five years, including fourteen in the classroom as a high school teacher. He spent an additional eight years working as a school administrator, in positions such as assistant principal and alternative school director. Woods also worked as a purchasing agent for a multi-national laser company and has been a small business owner. In the November 3, 2026 general election, Woods lost his bid for a fourth term to Democratic challenger Lydia Powell.

== Personal life ==
Woods was born in Pensacola, Florida, as part of a military family. The family moved frequently, living in California, Hawaii, and Virginia before finally settling in Georgia. Woods is a graduate of Fitzgerald High School. He is married to Lisha, a retired educator of thirty years, and has been a long-time resident of Tifton.

Party political offices
Preceded by John Barge	Republican nominee for Georgia Superintendent of Schools; 2014, 2018, 2022	Most recent
Political offices
Preceded by John Barge	Georgia Superintendent of Schools; 2015–present	Succeeded by Lydia Powell elect
