= Georgia Department of Education =

Government agency of Georgia (U.S. state)

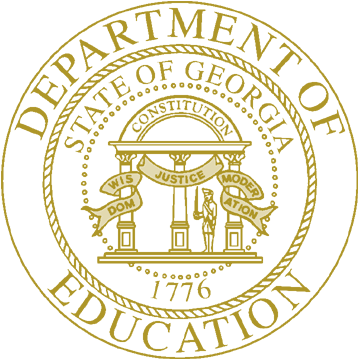
- Seal

- Logo

Department overview
- Formed: 1870
- Jurisdiction: Georgia
- Headquarters: 205 Jesse Hill Jr. Drive SE at Martin Luther King Jr. Drive, Atlanta, Georgia
- Employees: 935 (2025)
- Annual budget: $128,000,000 (2026)
- Department executive: Richard Woods, State School Superintendent
- Website: gadoe.org

The Georgia Department of Education (GaDOE) is an American agency that governs public education in the state of Georgia. The department manages funding and testing for local educational agencies accountable for student achievement. The department is managed by the State Superintendent of Schools and State Board of Education. The state school superintendent serves as the department's chief executive, and is a publicly elected position currently held by Richard Woods (since 2015). Former Superintendents of the department have included Linda Schrenko, Kathy Cox, William Bradley Bryant, John Barge, and Charles McDaniel; the first superintendent was John Randolph Lewis, in 1871.

The department is headquartered in the 2054 Twin Towers East building at 205 Jesse Hill Jr. Drive SE at Martin Luther King Jr. Drive in downtown Atlanta.

== History ==
Public education in Georgia began with the original 1777 Constitution of Georgia, which established that "[s]chools shall be erected in each county, and supported at the general expense of the State, as the legislature shall hereafter point out." Despite this, the State government often did little to provide for the funding up until the 1820's, when the State began creating "monetary funds" to fund county academies. In 1822, the Georgia General Assembly approved the creation of a "poor school fund", and that each county should appoint its own official to "superintend the education of the poor children". The advancement of public funding for education eventually stagnated, and provisions providing for local taxes to fund local schools were repealed. It wasn't until the efforts of Governor Joseph E. Brown that efforts gained steam, and eventually in 1858 secured $100,000 for schools through the earnings of the Western and Atlantic Railroad.

The same act in 1858 also allowed each county to convene its own "board of examiners" to certify teachers, and an act of the following year allowed each county to convene a board of education. Finally, in 1870, the Georgia State Board of Education was established, and was originally composed of the Governor, the Attorney General, the Secretary of State, the Comptroller General and the State School Commissioner. The commissioner was to be appointed by the governor and confirmed by the Georgia State Senate, which is still in place today. In addition to its general responsibilities, the board also had the express authority to "prescribe, from time to time, what text-books and books of reference shall be used in the common schools of the State: Provided, [t]hat the Bible shall not be excluded from the public schools of the State."

Today, both the Georgia Board of Education and the state school superintendent oversee the Department of Education.

== Organization ==
The following five offices compose the Georgia Department of Education: the Office of Standards, Instruction and Assessment, the Office of Finance and Business Operations, the Office of Policy and External Affairs, the Office of Education Support and Improvement, and the Office of Technology Services.

=== Office of Standards, Instruction and Assessment ===
The Office of Standards, Instructions and Assessment is made up of three Divisions: the Division of Standards Based Learning, which works to provide learning materials and instruction to assist teachers in making sure their students are prepared for graduation and beyond, the Division of Innovative Instruction, which provides educational programs and material for students, and the Division of Assessment and Accountability, which assesses student achievements and provides data to teachers and schools in order to better learn from their strengths and weaknesses.

=== Office of Finance and Business Operations ===
The Office of Finance and Business Operations has seven divisions: Account Services, Budget Services, Facility Services, Financial Review, Internal Support, Pupil Transportation and School Nutrition. For the most part these divisions see to the financial needs of the Department of Education and the schools in Georgia. However, the Pupil Transportation and School Nutrition divisions also work to interpret of laws and regulations and provide leadership and training assistance.

=== Office of Policy and External Affairs ===
The Office of Policy and External Affairs maintains divisions which deal with charter schools, communication, human resources, policy and state schools.

=== Office of Education Support and Improvement ===
Several divisions make up the Office of Education Support and Improvement. Learning Support provides services to schools, teachers and students. Migrant Education works with eligible children in Georgia. School Improvement helps schools by putting together a "statewide system" of tools and resources.

=== Office of Technology Services ===
The Office of Technology Services is split into two divisions: the Instructional Technology division, which integrates technology into the classroom and the Information Technology division, which builds infrastructures so information can be given to decision makers in the state.

== State exams ==
The State of Georgia requires students to take several state tests, generally administered through the Georgia Milestones Assessment System. Elementary and middle school students take End of Grade assessments, while high schoolers take End of Course Assessments for certain courses.

== Rulings ==
In 2021 the Department of Education banned teaching that "indoctrinates" students about racism.

== List of superintendents ==
=== Appointed ===
- John Randolph Lewis
- Gustavus Orr
- James Schley Hook

=== Elected ===
- Gustavus Richard Glenn
- William B. Merritt
- Jere M. Pound
- Marion L. Brittain
- Marvin M. Parks
- Nathaniel H. Ballard
- Fort E. Land
- Mell L. Duggan
- Mauney D. Collins
- Claude Purcell
- Jack P. Nix
- Charles McDaniel
- Werner Rogers
- Linda Schrenko
- Kathy Cox
- William Bradley Bryant
- John Barge
- Richard Woods
