= 1988 United States presidential election in Georgia =

- November 8, 1988
- Turnout: 61.53% (of registered voters); 47.41% (of voting age population)

Nominee	George H. W. Bush	Michael Dukakis
Party	Republican	Democratic
Home state	Texas	Massachusetts
Running mate	Dan Quayle	Lloyd Bentsen
Electoral vote	12	0
Popular vote	1,081,331	714,792
Percentage	59.75%	39.50%
County results
Bush
40–50%
50–60%
60–70%
70–80%
Dukakis
40–50%
50–60%
60–70%
70–80%
President before election
Ronald Reagan
Republican
Elected President
George H. W. Bush
Republican

The 1988 United States presidential election in Georgia took place on November 8, 1988. All 50 states and the District of Columbia were part of the 1988 United States presidential election. Georgia voters chose 12 electors to the Electoral College, which selected the president and vice president. Georgia was won by incumbent Vice President George H. W. Bush of Texas, who was running against Massachusetts Governor Michael Dukakis. Bush ran with Indiana Senator Dan Quayle as vice president, and Dukakis ran with Texas Senator Lloyd Bentsen.

Only two counties failed to give one of the major party nominees an outright majority: Clarke, which gave Dukakis a narrow plurality, and Bibb, which gave Bush a narrow plurality. Bush won four counties that had voted for Walter Mondale in 1984, out of only seven such counties nationwide. (Note: These seven counties that voted for Mondale in 1984 and Bush in 1988 were Lincoln County and Hardeman County, Tennessee – in both of which Bush was only the second-ever GOP winner after Richard Nixon in 1972 – Strom Thurmond’s home county of Edgefield, South Carolina, and the four Georgia counties of Bibb, Taylor, Telfair and Mitchell.) Georgia was one of only two states that Bush carried in 1988 which had voted for Jimmy Carter in 1980, the other being Maryland.

== Background ==
Georgia was the only former Confederate state that supported the Democratic presidential nominee in any of the 1980, 1984, and 1988 presidential elections. In 1986, 37% of white voters identified as Democrats.

Mack Mattingly's election to the U.S. Senate in 1980 made him the first Republican statewide official since Reconstruction, but he was defeated by Wyche Fowler in the 1986 election. However, the Republicans increased their seat total in the Georgia General Assembly from 28 to 48 seats between 1980 and 1989.

== Primaries ==
=== Democratic primary ===
The racial composition of the Democratic primary electorate was 64% white and 36% black. Al Gore won 53% of the white vote. Jesse Jackson won with a plurality of the vote.

1988 Georgia Democratic presidential primary results
Candidate	Vote received	
Candidate	#	%
Jesse Jackson	247,831	39.80%
Albert Gore, Jr.	201,490	32.36%
Michael Dukakis	97,179	15.61%
Dick Gephardt	41,489	6.66%
Gary Hart	15,852	2.55%
Paul Simon	8,388	1.35%
Uncommitted	7,276	1.17%
Bruce Babbitt	3,247	0.52%
Total	622,752	100%

=== Republican primary ===
Among white voters, 49% participated in the Republican primary.

George H. W. Bush won Georgia in the Republican primary, but supporters of Pat Robertson staged a walkout of the state's convention in protest of the delegate selection. Two competing delegate slates were sent to the Republican National Convention. The Georgian delegation was divided equally between the Bush and Robertson supporters to avoid controversy, but John Stuckey Jr., a Bush supporter and chair of the Georgia Republican Party, threatened to resign in protest of the deal. The Robertson delegates attempted to have Brant Frost IV, Robertson's campaign chair for Georgia, be selected as the chair of the Georgia delegation, but was rejected in favor of U.S. Representative Pat Swindall.

Georgia's national committeeman was sought by the Bush-backed Newt Gingrich, Robertson-backed incumbent Carl Gillis, and Joe Rogers. Gillis won the position. Bush's campaign formed a twenty-one-member steering committee for Georgia, which only included two supporters of Robertson. Gillis operated a separate Bush campaign in southern Georgia.

1988 Georgia Republican presidential primary results
Candidate	Vote received	
Candidate	#	%
George H.W. Bush	215,516	53.75%
Bob Dole	94,749	23.63%
Pat Robertson	65,163	16.25%
Jack Kemp	23,409	5.84%
Pete Du Pont	1,309	0.33%
Alexander Haig	782	0.20%
Total	400,928	100.00%

== Campaign ==
Speaker Tom Murphy initially supported Dukakis, but withdrew his support in October due to his stance on capital punishment and gun control. Lester Maddox, a former Democratic governor, criticized Dukakis as a "socialist and revolutionary leftist" and promised to conduct an anti-Dukakis campaign in six southern states. Dukakis planned on conducting a tour of the state in October, but it was canceled as scheduling conflicts prevented state Democratic leaders from joining him.

Bush won 134 counties and all of the metropolitan areas in the state. Dukakis won 25 counties, 15 of which had a majority black population and six of which had a black population of 40%-50%. Among white voters, 72% supported Bush, while 27% supported Dukakis. However, the Democrats retained control of the state legislature and nine of the state's ten seats in the U.S. House of Representatives.

== Results ==
1988 United States presidential election in Georgia
Party	Candidate	Running mate	Votes	Percentage	Electoral votes
Republican	George H. W. Bush	Dan Quayle	1,081,331	59.75%	12
Democratic	Michael Dukakis	Lloyd Bentsen	714,792	39.50%	0
Libertarian	Ron Paul	Andre Marrou	8,435	0.47%	0
New Alliance Party	Lenora Fulani	Joyce Dattner	5,099	0.28%	0
Write-Ins	—	—	15 (Note: These write-in votes were not separated by county but given only as a state-wide total.)	>0.01%	0
Totals			1,809,672	100.0%	12

=== Results by county ===
County	George H.W. Bush Republican		Michael Dukakis Democratic		Ron Paul Libertarian		Leonora Fulani New Alliance		Margin		Total votes cast
County	#	%	#	%	#	%	#	%	#	%	Total votes cast
Appling	3,000	61.74%	1,837	37.81%	13	0.27%	9	0.19%	1,163	23.93%	4,859
Atkinson	1,126	55.60%	887	43.80%	5	0.25%	7	0.35%	239	11.80%	2,025
Bacon	1,407	64.13%	780	35.55%	5	0.23%	2	0.09%	627	28.58%	2,194
Baker	629	46.66%	707	52.45%	10	0.74%	2	0.15%	-78	-5.79%	1,348
Baldwin	5,852	59.05%	4,008	40.44%	26	0.26%	25	0.25%	1,844	18.61%	9,911
Banks	1,590	61.58%	984	38.11%	3	0.12%	5	0.19%	606	23.47%	2,582
Barrow	4,738	65.64%	2,442	33.83%	32	0.44%	6	0.08%	2,296	31.81%	7,218
Bartow	8,039	61.63%	4,884	37.44%	113	0.87%	8	0.06%	3,155	24.19%	13,044
Ben Hill	2,005	51.17%	1,867	47.65%	32	0.82%	14	0.36%	138	3.52%	3,918
Berrien	2,030	59.36%	1,381	40.38%	7	0.20%	2	0.06%	649	18.98%	3,420
Bibb	22,179	49.96%	22,084	49.74%	78	0.18%	55	0.12%	95	0.22%	44,396
Bleckley	1,950	62.14%	1,175	37.44%	9	0.29%	4	0.13%	775	24.70%	3,138
Brantley	1,539	51.18%	1,450	48.22%	10	0.33%	8	0.27%	89	2.96%	3,007
Brooks	2,136	58.54%	1,500	41.11%	6	0.16%	7	0.19%	636	17.43%	3,649
Bryan	2,802	66.16%	1,423	33.60%	5	0.12%	5	0.12%	1,379	32.56%	4,235
Bulloch	6,354	64.88%	3,417	34.89%	19	0.19%	4	0.04%	2,937	29.99%	9,794
Burke	2,988	50.89%	2,861	48.72%	10	0.17%	13	0.22%	127	2.17%	5,872
Butts	2,184	55.66%	1,730	44.09%	4	0.10%	6	0.15%	454	11.57%	3,924
Calhoun	644	41.52%	901	58.09%	6	0.39%	0	0.00%	-257	-16.57%	1,551
Camden	2,913	57.68%	2,090	41.39%	35	0.69%	12	0.24%	823	16.29%	5,050
Candler	1,261	58.82%	877	40.90%	4	0.19%	2	0.09%	384	17.92%	2,144
Carroll	10,754	69.20%	4,706	30.28%	49	0.32%	32	0.21%	6,048	38.92%	15,541
Catoosa	9,319	72.02%	3,588	27.73%	21	0.16%	12	0.09%	5,731	44.29%	12,940
Charlton	1,327	57.60%	943	40.93%	18	0.78%	16	0.69%	384	16.67%	2,304
Chatham	35,623	58.12%	25,063	40.89%	336	0.55%	267	0.44%	10,560	17.23%	61,289
Chattahoochee	454	55.57%	362	44.31%	1	0.12%	0	0.00%	92	11.26%	817
Chattooga	3,665	62.17%	2,206	37.42%	22	0.37%	2	0.03%	1,459	24.75%	5,895
Cherokee	14,593	76.45%	4,378	22.94%	101	0.53%	16	0.08%	10,215	53.51%	19,088
Clarke	11,150	49.66%	11,154	49.68%	109	0.49%	39	0.17%	-4	-0.02%	22,452
Clay	398	40.04%	595	59.86%	1	0.10%	0	0.00%	-197	-19.82%	994
Clayton	28,225	65.43%	14,689	34.05%	167	0.39%	56	0.13%	13,536	31.38%	43,137
Clinch	863	58.91%	594	40.55%	4	0.27%	4	0.27%	269	18.36%	1,465
Cobb	106,621	72.70%	39,297	26.79%	607	0.41%	133	0.09%	67,324	45.91%	146,658
Coffee	4,019	58.91%	2,777	40.71%	20	0.29%	6	0.09%	1,242	18.20%	6,822
Colquitt	5,653	65.04%	2,998	34.50%	24	0.28%	16	0.18%	2,655	30.54%	8,691
Columbia	16,401	77.75%	4,617	21.89%	56	0.27%	20	0.09%	11,784	55.86%	21,094
Cook	1,555	55.69%	1,226	43.91%	4	0.14%	7	0.25%	329	11.78%	2,792
Coweta	9,668	69.41%	4,212	30.24%	33	0.24%	16	0.11%	5,456	39.17%	13,929
Crawford	1,235	47.55%	1,340	51.60%	14	0.54%	8	0.31%	-105	-4.05%	2,597
Crisp	2,916	62.94%	1,690	36.48%	15	0.32%	12	0.26%	1,226	26.46%	4,633
Dade	2,539	69.16%	1,120	30.51%	6	0.16%	6	0.16%	1,419	38.65%	3,671
Dawson	1,908	71.03%	761	28.33%	16	0.60%	1	0.04%	1,147	42.70%	2,686
Decatur	3,866	61.95%	2,348	37.62%	9	0.14%	18	0.29%	1,518	24.33%	6,241
DeKalb	90,179	48.94%	92,521	50.21%	945	0.51%	605	0.33%	-2,342	-1.27%	184,250
Dodge	2,677	54.95%	2,164	44.42%	15	0.31%	16	0.33%	513	10.53%	4,872
Dooly	1,386	45.88%	1,613	53.39%	18	0.60%	4	0.13%	-227	-7.51%	3,021
Dougherty	15,520	50.86%	12,579	41.22%	1,415	4.64%	1,003	3.29%	2,941	9.64%	30,517
Douglas	13,493	72.24%	5,086	27.23%	77	0.41%	22	0.12%	8,407	45.01%	18,678
Early	1,918	58.46%	1,359	41.42%	2	0.06%	2	0.06%	559	17.04%	3,281
Echols	422	62.99%	245	36.57%	2	0.30%	1	0.15%	177	26.42%	670
Effingham	3,933	67.13%	1,905	32.51%	14	0.24%	7	0.12%	2,028	34.62%	5,859
Elbert	2,796	56.77%	2,118	43.01%	11	0.22%	0	0.00%	678	13.76%	4,925
Emanuel	3,530	58.95%	2,387	39.86%	54	0.90%	17	0.28%	1,143	19.09%	5,988
Evans	1,707	62.01%	1,023	37.16%	14	0.51%	9	0.33%	684	24.85%	2,753
Fannin	4,271	66.45%	2,123	33.03%	27	0.42%	6	0.09%	2,148	33.42%	6,427
Fayette	16,443	77.84%	4,593	21.74%	73	0.35%	14	0.07%	11,850	56.10%	21,123
Floyd	14,697	62.85%	8,548	36.55%	111	0.47%	30	0.13%	6,149	26.30%	23,386
Forsyth	7,947	76.83%	2,347	22.69%	42	0.41%	8	0.08%	5,600	54.14%	10,344
Franklin	2,615	58.57%	1,842	41.25%	6	0.13%	2	0.04%	773	17.32%	4,465
Fulton	91,785	42.75%	120,752	56.25%	906	0.42%	1,246	0.58%	-28,967	-13.50%	214,689
Gilmer	3,353	70.65%	1,363	28.72%	24	0.51%	6	0.13%	1,990	41.93%	4,746
Glascock	580	73.42%	210	26.58%	0	0.00%	0	0.00%	370	46.84%	790
Glynn	11,126	63.18%	6,339	35.99%	78	0.44%	68	0.39%	4,787	27.19%	17,611
Gordon	6,051	71.65%	2,369	28.05%	18	0.21%	7	0.08%	3,682	43.60%	8,445
Grady	2,989	61.10%	1,883	38.49%	10	0.20%	10	0.20%	1,106	22.61%	4,892
Greene	1,432	43.93%	1,818	55.77%	9	0.28%	1	0.03%	-386	-11.84%	3,260
Gwinnett	66,372	75.47%	20,948	23.82%	523	0.59%	97	0.11%	45,424	51.65%	87,940
Habersham	4,871	69.45%	2,114	30.14%	22	0.31%	7	0.10%	2,757	39.31%	7,014
Hall	17,415	68.71%	7,782	30.71%	110	0.43%	37	0.15%	9,633	38.00%	25,344
Hancock	621	23.99%	1,947	75.20%	11	0.42%	10	0.39%	-1,326	-51.21%	2,589
Haralson	4,529	65.17%	2,404	34.59%	15	0.22%	2	0.03%	2,125	30.58%	6,950
Harris	3,414	63.94%	1,905	35.68%	17	0.32%	3	0.06%	1,509	28.26%	5,339
Hart	3,044	54.88%	2,476	44.64%	20	0.36%	7	0.13%	568	10.24%	5,547
Heard	1,551	63.77%	874	35.94%	3	0.12%	4	0.16%	677	27.83%	2,432
Henry	10,882	71.11%	4,348	28.41%	57	0.37%	17	0.11%	6,534	42.70%	15,304
Houston	15,748	64.02%	8,664	35.22%	106	0.43%	79	0.32%	7,084	28.80%	24,597
Irwin	1,226	57.00%	918	42.68%	4	0.19%	3	0.14%	308	14.32%	2,151
Jackson	4,407	62.56%	2,607	37.00%	17	0.24%	14	0.20%	1,800	25.56%	7,045
Jasper	1,474	55.08%	1,188	44.39%	10	0.37%	4	0.15%	286	10.69%	2,676
Jeff Davis	2,050	62.03%	1,242	37.58%	7	0.21%	6	0.18%	808	24.45%	3,305
Jefferson	2,788	54.13%	2,346	45.54%	10	0.19%	7	0.14%	442	8.59%	5,151
Jenkins	1,288	57.30%	953	42.39%	7	0.31%	0	0.00%	335	14.91%	2,248
Johnson	1,567	62.83%	927	37.17%	0	0.00%	0	0.00%	640	25.66%	2,494
Jones	3,618	57.41%	2,662	42.24%	11	0.17%	11	0.17%	956	15.17%	6,302
Lamar	2,035	57.83%	1,416	40.24%	53	1.51%	15	0.43%	619	17.59%	3,519
Lanier	725	50.81%	698	48.91%	1	0.07%	3	0.21%	27	1.90%	1,427
Laurens	6,929	57.89%	4,879	40.76%	133	1.11%	29	0.24%	2,050	17.13%	11,970
Lee	2,875	74.04%	995	25.62%	10	0.26%	3	0.08%	1,880	48.42%	3,883
Liberty	3,100	51.24%	2,906	48.03%	32	0.53%	12	0.20%	194	3.21%	6,050
Lincoln	1,417	60.97%	893	38.43%	8	0.34%	6	0.26%	524	22.54%	2,324
Long	858	55.32%	681	43.91%	4	0.26%	8	0.52%	177	11.41%	1,551
Lowndes	10,855	62.63%	6,427	37.08%	35	0.20%	16	0.09%	4,428	25.55%	17,333
Lumpkin	2,688	67.20%	1,286	32.15%	19	0.48%	7	0.18%	1,402	35.05%	4,000
Macon	1,412	38.19%	2,268	61.35%	7	0.19%	10	0.27%	-856	-23.16%	3,697
Madison	3,724	69.10%	1,639	30.41%	15	0.28%	11	0.20%	2,085	38.69%	5,389
Marion	804	48.67%	844	51.09%	2	0.12%	2	0.12%	-40	-2.42%	1,652
McDuffie	3,231	65.04%	1,704	34.30%	12	0.24%	21	0.42%	1,527	30.74%	4,968
McIntosh	1,273	45.08%	1,527	54.07%	13	0.46%	11	0.39%	-254	-8.99%	2,824
Meriwether	3,101	51.31%	2,934	48.54%	9	0.15%	0	0.00%	167	2.77%	6,044
Miller	1,105	68.00%	515	31.69%	2	0.12%	3	0.18%	590	36.31%	1,625
Mitchell	2,590	53.29%	2,260	46.50%	5	0.10%	5	0.10%	330	6.79%	4,860
Monroe	2,570	56.38%	1,970	43.22%	11	0.24%	7	0.15%	600	13.16%	4,558
Montgomery	1,228	57.49%	903	42.28%	5	0.23%	0	0.00%	325	15.21%	2,136
Morgan	2,108	58.10%	1,508	41.57%	12	0.33%	0	0.00%	600	16.53%	3,628
Murray	3,996	70.11%	1,679	29.46%	16	0.28%	9	0.16%	2,317	40.65%	5,700
Muscogee	23,058	54.90%	18,772	44.70%	112	0.27%	58	0.14%	4,286	10.20%	42,000
Newton	5,809	64.77%	3,111	34.69%	35	0.39%	14	0.16%	2,698	30.08%	8,969
Oconee	4,265	67.89%	1,990	31.68%	26	0.41%	1	0.02%	2,275	36.21%	6,282
Oglethorpe	1,951	62.61%	1,154	37.03%	7	0.22%	4	0.13%	797	25.58%	3,116
Paulding	7,329	72.63%	2,717	26.92%	36	0.36%	9	0.09%	4,612	45.71%	10,091
Peach	2,782	48.00%	2,972	51.28%	20	0.35%	22	0.38%	-190	-3.28%	5,796
Pickens	3,021	67.52%	1,430	31.96%	14	0.31%	9	0.20%	1,591	35.56%	4,474
Pierce	1,947	55.49%	1,558	44.40%	1	0.03%	3	0.09%	389	11.09%	3,509
Pike	2,074	63.35%	1,176	35.92%	23	0.70%	1	0.03%	898	27.43%	3,274
Polk	5,454	64.46%	2,977	35.18%	23	0.27%	7	0.08%	2,477	29.28%	8,461
Pulaski	1,400	48.48%	1,476	51.11%	7	0.24%	5	0.17%	-76	-2.63%	2,888
Putnam	2,111	57.74%	1,532	41.90%	7	0.19%	6	0.16%	579	15.84%	3,656
Quitman	296	40.11%	436	59.08%	4	0.54%	2	0.27%	-140	-18.97%	738
Rabun	2,278	63.14%	1,301	36.06%	16	0.44%	13	0.36%	977	27.08%	3,608
Randolph	1,319	48.94%	1,369	50.80%	4	0.15%	3	0.11%	-50	-1.86%	2,695
Richmond	27,566	57.12%	20,489	42.46%	118	0.24%	85	0.18%	7,077	14.66%	48,258
Rockdale	12,413	73.77%	4,330	25.73%	65	0.39%	18	0.11%	8,083	48.04%	16,826
Schley	635	58.91%	439	40.72%	3	0.28%	1	0.09%	196	18.19%	1,078
Screven	2,178	59.52%	1,461	39.93%	12	0.33%	8	0.22%	717	19.59%	3,659
Seminole	1,469	55.54%	1,171	44.27%	2	0.08%	3	0.11%	298	11.27%	2,645
Spalding	7,730	63.68%	4,318	35.57%	57	0.47%	33	0.27%	3,412	28.11%	12,138
Stephens	4,329	66.09%	2,185	33.36%	27	0.41%	9	0.14%	2,144	32.73%	6,550
Stewart	832	42.17%	1,136	57.58%	3	0.15%	2	0.10%	-304	-15.41%	1,973
Sumter	4,289	55.93%	3,332	43.45%	23	0.30%	24	0.31%	957	12.48%	7,668
Talbot	802	38.93%	1,248	60.58%	6	0.29%	4	0.19%	-446	-21.65%	2,060
Taliaferro	306	39.38%	469	60.36%	1	0.13%	1	0.13%	-163	-20.98%	777
Tattnall	3,172	65.03%	1,694	34.73%	8	0.16%	4	0.08%	1,478	30.30%	4,878
Taylor	1,145	50.13%	1,134	49.65%	3	0.13%	2	0.09%	11	0.48%	2,284
Telfair	1,805	50.21%	1,765	49.10%	13	0.36%	12	0.33%	40	1.11%	3,595
Terrell	1,517	52.22%	1,383	47.61%	2	0.07%	3	0.10%	134	4.61%	2,905
Thomas	6,572	64.78%	3,530	34.80%	24	0.24%	19	0.19%	3,042	29.98%	10,145
Tift	4,760	65.80%	2,446	33.81%	16	0.22%	12	0.17%	2,314	31.99%	7,234
Toombs	4,433	78.89%	1,152	20.50%	25	0.44%	9	0.16%	3,281	58.39%	5,619
Towns	1,783	65.12%	942	34.40%	11	0.40%	2	0.07%	841	30.72%	2,738
Treutlen	970	57.19%	726	42.81%	0	0.00%	0	0.00%	244	14.38%	1,696
Troup	9,484	67.31%	4,562	32.38%	36	0.26%	7	0.05%	4,922	34.93%	14,089
Turner	1,312	50.52%	1,122	43.20%	90	3.47%	73	2.81%	190	7.32%	2,597
Twiggs	1,261	41.96%	1,730	57.57%	9	0.30%	5	0.17%	-469	-15.61%	3,005
Union	2,396	65.39%	1,258	34.33%	10	0.27%	0	0.00%	1,138	31.06%	3,664
Upson	4,614	63.05%	2,666	36.43%	26	0.36%	12	0.16%	1,948	26.62%	7,318
Walker	10,487	68.63%	4,753	31.11%	31	0.20%	9	0.06%	5,734	37.52%	15,280
Walton	5,974	65.56%	3,091	33.92%	31	0.34%	16	0.18%	2,883	31.64%	9,112
Ware	4,819	52.59%	4,292	46.84%	26	0.28%	26	0.28%	527	5.75%	9,163
Warren	897	44.78%	1,091	54.47%	6	0.30%	9	0.45%	-194	-9.69%	2,003
Washington	2,752	51.12%	2,615	48.58%	5	0.09%	11	0.20%	137	2.54%	5,383
Wayne	3,340	57.93%	2,417	41.92%	8	0.14%	1	0.02%	923	16.01%	5,766
Webster	361	45.70%	427	54.05%	2	0.25%	0	0.00%	-66	-8.35%	790
Wheeler	709	51.64%	658	47.92%	4	0.29%	2	0.15%	51	3.72%	1,373
White	2,648	71.65%	1,028	27.81%	19	0.51%	1	0.03%	1,620	43.84%	3,696
Whitfield	12,761	73.12%	4,618	26.46%	40	0.23%	32	0.18%	8,143	46.66%	17,451
Wilcox	1,235	53.26%	1,079	46.53%	5	0.22%	0	0.00%	156	6.73%	2,319
Wilkes	1,810	53.71%	1,549	45.96%	8	0.24%	3	0.09%	261	7.75%	3,370
Wilkinson	1,546	45.30%	1,831	53.65%	25	0.73%	11	0.32%	-285	-8.35%	3,413
Worth	2,668	66.55%	1,311	32.70%	20	0.50%	10	0.25%	1,357	33.85%	4,009
Totals	1,081,331	59.75%	714,792	39.50%	8,435	0.47%	5,099	0.28%	366,539	20.25%	1,809,672

==== Counties that flipped from Republican to Democratic ====
- Clarke
- DeKalb
- Pulaski
- Randolph

==== Counties that flipped from Democratic to Republican ====
- Bibb
- Mitchell
- Taylor
- Telfair
- Washington

== See also ==
- Presidency of George H. W. Bush
- 1988 Democratic National Convention - held in Atlanta, GA

== Works cited ==
- Black, Earl; Black, Merle (2002). The Rise of Southern Republicans. Harvard University Press. ISBN 067400728X.
- Black, Earl; Black, Merle (1992). The Vital South: How Presidents Are Elected. Harvard University Press. ISBN 0674941306.
- Moreland, Laurence; Steed, Robert; Baker, Tod, eds. (1991). The 1988 Presidential Election in the South: Continuity Amidst Change in Southern Party Politics. Praeger Publishers. ISBN 0275931455.
