= 1992 United States presidential election in Georgia =

- November 3, 1992

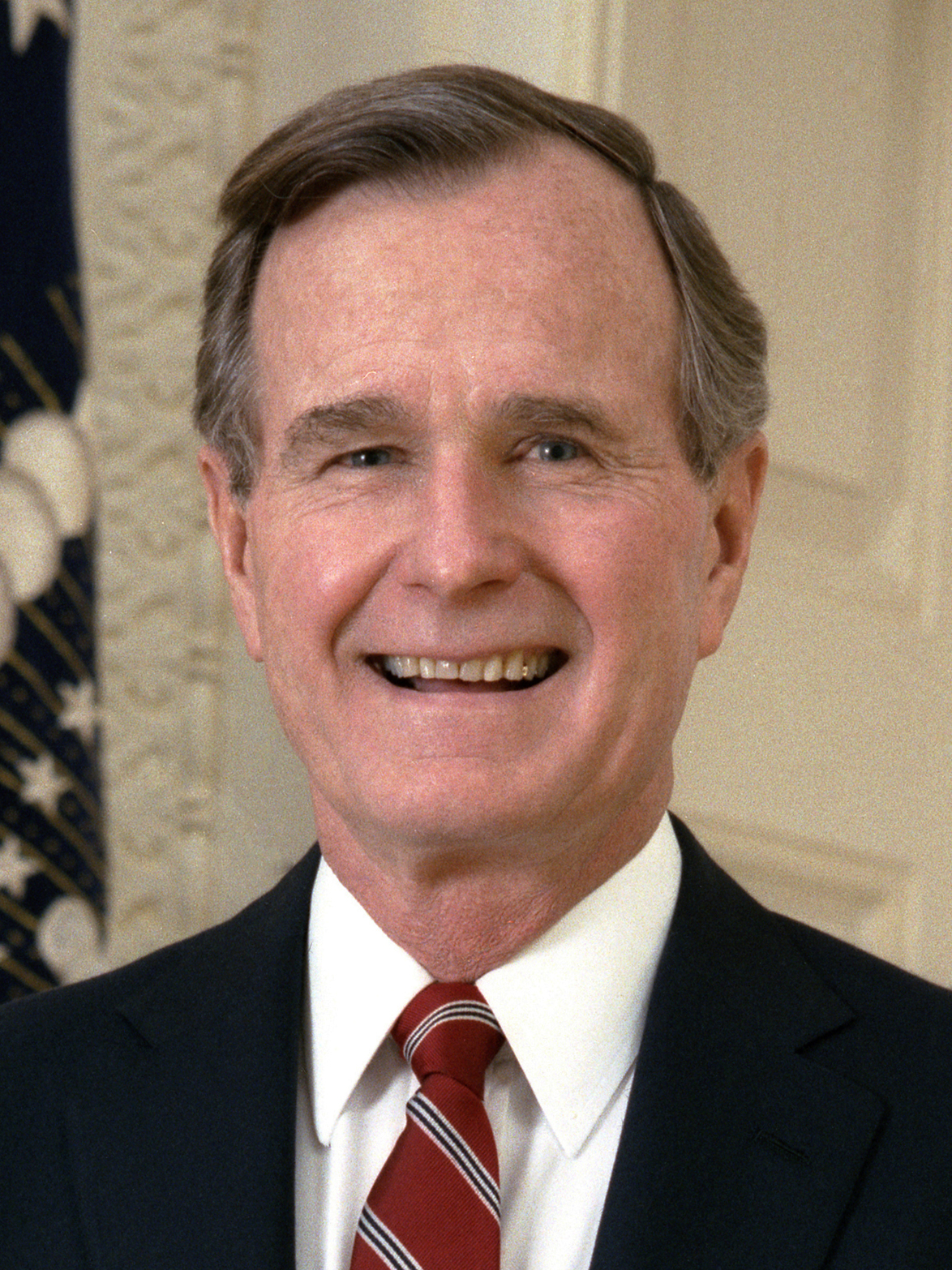

Nominee	Bill Clinton	George H. W. Bush	Ross Perot
Party	Democratic	Republican	Independent
Home state	Arkansas	Texas	Texas
Running mate	Al Gore	Dan Quayle	James Stockdale
Electoral vote	13	0	0
Popular vote	1,008,966	995,252	309,657
Percentage	43.47%	42.88%	13.34%

Clinton
30–40%
40–50%
50–60%
60–70%
70–80%
80–90%
90–100%
Bush
30–40%
40–50%
50–60%
60–70%
70–80%
80–90%
Perot
40–50%
Tie
43.87% Clinton & Bush
President before election
George H. W. Bush
Republican
Elected President
Bill Clinton
Democratic

The 1992 United States presidential election in Georgia took place on November 3, 1992, and was part of the 1992 United States presidential election. Voters chose 13 representatives, or electors to the Electoral College, who voted for president and vice president.

Georgia was won by Governor Bill Clinton (D-AR). The presidential contest in Georgia was the closest of any state that year, with Clinton winning 43.47% to 42.88% over Incumbent President George H. W. Bush (R-TX) by a thin margin of 0.59%. This made it the first time that Georgia had voted Democratic since 1980, when it voted for Jimmy Carter, the former governor. The state flipped back into the Republican column in 1996 and stayed there until 2020. From the mid-1960s into the 1990s, Georgia was a swing state in presidential elections, but also a state where Democrats generally dominated at the state and local level. Billionaire businessman Ross Perot (I-TX) finished third, with a significant 13.34% of the popular vote.

== Background ==
Georgia gave the Democratic nominee John F. Kennedy his second best result in the 1960 election, but the state broke away from the Democrats by voting for Republican nominee Barry Goldwater in 1964 and American Independent nominee George Wallace in 1968. Democratic nominee Jimmy Carter his home state of Georgia in 1976 and 1980. The Republican nominee won Georgia in the 1984 and 1988 presidential elections.

Wyche Fowler defeated incumbent Republican U.S. Senator Mack Mattingly in the 1986 election. In 1988, the Democrats retained control of the state legislature and nine of the state's ten seats in the U.S. House of Representatives despite losing the state in the presidential election.

In September 1991, Governor Zell Miller proposed that Georgia's primaries should be held on March 3, 1992, one week ahead of Super Tuesday, in order to not be overshadowed by larger states. The state legislature approved this idea in January 1992.

== Primary ==
=== Democratic ===
Bill Clinton was endorsed by U.S. Senator Sam Nunn, Miller, Speaker of the Georgia House of Representatives Tom Murphy, and other major Democratic figures in the state. Miller introduced Clinton to Paul Begala, who managed Miller's 1990 gubernatorial campaign, and James Carville. Bob Kerrey had the support of Secretary of State Max Cleland and Agricultural Commissioner Tommy Irvin.

Jesse Jackson won Georgia in the 1988 Democratic primary and Clinton was suffering from a lack of support among black voters. Around 10% of black voters in the south supported him in January 1992, compared to 34% for Jerry Brown. Clinton was endorsed by U.S. Representative John Lewis, Mayor Maynard Jackson, and former Mayor Andrew Young. Mike Thurmond, the chair of the Legislative Black Caucus, supported Paul Tsongas.

Tsongas spent $122,295 in the Atlanta media market compared to Clinton's $115,740. Brown only paid for ads on cable television.

Clinton placed first in 158 of the state's 159 counties. He received 52% of the white vote, had a five to one margin with black voters compared to Tsongas, and won 80% of high school dropouts. Kerry withdrew after the primary on March 5, and Tom Harkin on March 9.

1992 Georgia Democratic presidential primary results
Candidate	Vote received/	
Candidate	#	%
Bill Clinton	259,907	57.17%
Paul E. Tsongas	109,148	24.01%
Edmund G. Brown, Jr.	36,808	8.10%
Bob Kerrey	22,033	4.85%
Uncommitted	17,256	3.80%
Tom Harkin	9,479	2.08%
Total	454,631	100%

=== Republican ===
Pat Buchanan focused more on the Georgia primary rather than the ones occurring in Maryland and Colorado on the same day. Buchanan spent $387,723 on television ads in the state compared to George H. W. Bush's $216,053. Buchanan received 44–47% of the male vote and around 25% of female voters. 86% of his supporters stated that they voted for him to send a message to Bush.

1992 Georgia Republican presidential primary results
Candidate	Vote received	
Candidate	#	%
George H. W. Bush	291,905	64.30%
Patrick J. Buchanan	162,082	35.70%
Total	453,987	100%

== General ==
137,182 signatures were required for Ross Perot to appear on the ballot. His supporters submitted the signatures on June 27, and they were certified on August 31.

The vice presidential debate was hosted in Atlanta on October 13.

As of the 2020 presidential election, this is the last time that Democrats would carry Pickens, Franklin, Lumpkin, Morgan, Lincoln, Brantley, Bacon, Worth, Bleckley, Monroe, Jeff Davis, Jones, Candler, Haralson, and Laurens counties. Ware County was tied, making this the last time it did not vote Republican, and the last time any county in the United States was tied between the Democratic and Republican parties.

The Republicans won in the concurrent U.S. Senate election. Their seat total in the Georgia House of Representatives rose from 34 to 50 and in the Georgia State Senate from 11 to 13.

== Results ==
1992 United States presidential election in Georgia
Party	Candidate	Running mate	Votes	Percentage	Electoral votes
Democratic	Bill Clinton	Al Gore	1,008,966	43.47%	13
Republican	George H. W. Bush (incumbent)	Dan Quayle (incumbent)	995,252	42.88%	0
Independent	Ross Perot	James Stockdale	309,657	13.34%	0
Libertarian	Andre Marrou	Nancy Lord	7,110	0.31%	0
America First	James "Bo" Gritz (write-in)	Cyril Minett	78 (Note: These write-in votes were not separated by county but given only as a state-wide total.)	0.00%	0
New Alliance Party	Lenora Fulani (write-in)	Maria Elizabeth Muñoz	44	0.00%	0
Other write-ins	—	—	10	0.00%	0
Socialist Workers	James Warren (write-in)	Estelle DeBates	9	0.00%	0
Taxpayers	Howard Phillips (write-in)	Albion Knight, Jr.	7	0.00%	0
Totals			2,321,133	100.00%	13
Voter turnout (voting age)					47%

=== Results by county ===
County	Bill Clinton Democratic		George H.W. Bush Republican		Ross Perot Independent		Andre Marrou Libertarian		Margin		Total votes cast
County	#	%	#	%	#	%	#	%	#	%	Total votes cast
Appling	2,455	40.73%	2,514	41.71%	1,047	17.37%	11	0.18%	-59	-0.98%	6,027
Atkinson	1,056	48.33%	779	35.65%	342	15.65%	8	0.37%	277	12.68%	2,185
Bacon	1,423	42.67%	1,301	39.01%	604	18.11%	7	0.21%	122	3.66%	3,335
Baker	864	58.86%	391	26.63%	210	14.31%	3	0.20%	473	32.23%	1,468
Baldwin	5,813	49.31%	4,262	36.16%	1,679	14.24%	34	0.29%	1,551	13.15%	11,788
Banks	1,530	41.68%	1,551	42.25%	583	15.88%	7	0.19%	-21	-0.57%	3,671
Barrow	3,991	39.98%	4,328	43.36%	1,633	16.36%	30	0.30%	-337	-3.38%	9,982
Bartow	6,675	39.29%	7,742	45.57%	2,500	14.71%	73	0.43%	-1,067	-6.28%	16,990
Ben Hill	2,348	52.60%	1,476	33.06%	619	13.87%	21	0.47%	872	19.54%	4,464
Berrien	2,103	46.29%	1,637	36.03%	796	17.52%	7	0.15%	466	10.26%	4,543
Bibb	28,070	51.93%	19,847	36.72%	6,021	11.14%	111	0.21%	8,223	15.21%	54,049
Bleckley	1,710	43.23%	1,570	39.69%	662	16.73%	14	0.35%	140	3.54%	3,956
Brantley	1,883	44.06%	1,541	36.06%	840	19.65%	10	0.23%	342	8.00%	4,274
Brooks	1,895	43.92%	1,779	41.23%	630	14.60%	11	0.25%	116	2.69%	4,315
Bryan	2,031	34.26%	2,789	47.05%	1,095	18.47%	13	0.22%	-758	-12.79%	5,928
Bulloch	4,903	38.78%	5,690	45.00%	2,020	15.98%	31	0.25%	-787	-6.22%	12,644
Burke	3,647	53.17%	2,390	34.84%	807	11.77%	15	0.22%	1,257	18.33%	6,859
Butts	2,448	50.46%	1,768	36.45%	619	12.76%	16	0.33%	680	14.01%	4,851
Calhoun	1,301	64.47%	464	22.99%	248	12.29%	5	0.25%	837	41.48%	2,018
Camden	2,952	38.99%	3,517	46.45%	1,077	14.22%	26	0.34%	-565	-7.46%	7,572
Candler	1,192	43.27%	1,014	36.81%	541	19.64%	8	0.29%	178	6.46%	2,755
Carroll	8,404	37.21%	10,750	47.60%	3,358	14.87%	74	0.33%	-2,346	-10.39%	22,586
Catoosa	4,817	32.70%	7,599	51.59%	2,290	15.55%	25	0.17%	-2,782	-18.89%	14,731
Charlton	1,127	38.97%	1,333	46.09%	427	14.76%	5	0.17%	-206	-7.12%	2,892
Chatham	31,533	43.75%	31,925	44.30%	8,269	11.47%	342	0.47%	-392	-0.55%	72,069
Chattahoochee	604	50.42%	413	34.47%	177	14.77%	4	0.33%	191	15.95%	1,198
Chattooga	2,976	46.47%	2,439	38.09%	965	15.07%	24	0.37%	537	8.38%	6,404
Cherokee	8,113	27.77%	16,054	54.95%	4,950	16.94%	97	0.33%	-7,941	-27.18%	29,214
Clarke	15,403	53.12%	10,459	36.07%	2,987	10.30%	149	0.51%	4,944	17.05%	28,998
Clay	778	65.00%	264	22.06%	155	12.95%	0	0.00%	514	42.94%	1,197
Clayton	25,890	44.65%	23,965	41.33%	7,942	13.70%	192	0.33%	1,925	3.32%	57,989
Clinch	759	41.32%	790	43.00%	286	15.57%	2	0.11%	-31	-1.68%	1,837
Cobb	63,960	32.45%	103,734	52.62%	28,747	14.58%	690	0.35%	-39,774	-20.17%	197,131
Coffee	3,275	39.27%	3,778	45.31%	1,256	15.06%	30	0.36%	-503	-6.04%	8,339
Colquitt	3,891	37.86%	4,680	45.54%	1,682	16.37%	23	0.22%	-789	-7.68%	10,276
Columbia	7,115	25.23%	16,657	59.07%	4,379	15.53%	49	0.17%	-9,542	-33.84%	28,200
Cook	1,731	48.02%	1,318	36.56%	537	14.90%	19	0.53%	413	11.46%	3,605
Coweta	7,093	34.51%	9,814	47.75%	3,587	17.45%	59	0.29%	-2,721	-13.24%	20,553
Crawford	1,648	51.78%	974	30.60%	549	17.25%	12	0.38%	674	21.18%	3,183
Crisp	2,610	45.72%	2,253	39.46%	823	14.42%	23	0.40%	357	6.26%	5,709
Dade	1,782	37.09%	2,191	45.61%	823	17.13%	8	0.17%	-409	-8.52%	4,804
Dawson	1,399	35.95%	1,696	43.58%	790	20.30%	7	0.18%	-297	-7.63%	3,892
Decatur	3,198	43.11%	3,142	42.35%	1,068	14.40%	11	0.15%	56	0.76%	7,419
DeKalb	124,559	57.82%	70,282	32.62%	19,741	9.16%	853	0.40%	54,277	25.20%	215,435
Dodge	3,002	47.82%	2,287	36.43%	978	15.58%	11	0.18%	715	11.39%	6,278
Dooly	1,993	58.84%	1,034	30.53%	350	10.33%	10	0.30%	959	28.31%	3,387
Dougherty	15,236	49.26%	12,455	40.27%	3,178	10.27%	62	0.20%	2,781	8.99%	30,931
Douglas	8,869	33.27%	13,349	50.08%	4,362	16.36%	77	0.29%	-4,480	-16.81%	26,657
Early	1,970	47.55%	1,457	35.17%	652	15.74%	64	1.54%	513	12.38%	4,143
Echols	312	34.25%	361	39.63%	238	26.13%	0	0.00%	-49	-5.38%	911
Effingham	2,690	33.78%	3,814	47.90%	1,443	18.12%	16	0.20%	-1,124	-14.12%	7,963
Elbert	3,025	49.05%	2,372	38.46%	757	12.28%	13	0.21%	653	10.59%	6,167
Emanuel	2,951	45.93%	2,662	41.43%	755	11.75%	57	0.89%	289	4.50%	6,425
Evans	1,230	41.55%	1,244	42.03%	480	16.22%	6	0.20%	-14	-0.48%	2,960
Fannin	2,902	40.33%	3,255	45.24%	1,028	14.29%	10	0.14%	-353	-4.91%	7,195
Fayette	8,430	26.60%	17,576	55.47%	5,598	17.67%	83	0.26%	-9,146	-28.87%	31,687
Floyd	11,614	41.69%	12,378	44.43%	3,779	13.56%	89	0.32%	-764	-2.74%	27,860
Forsyth	4,936	28.89%	8,652	50.64%	3,453	20.21%	45	0.26%	-3,716	-21.75%	17,086
Franklin	2,505	42.29%	2,391	40.37%	1,014	17.12%	13	0.22%	114	1.92%	5,923
Fulton	147,459	57.29%	85,451	33.20%	23,578	9.16%	921	0.36%	62,008	24.09%	257,409
Gilmer	2,311	39.25%	2,661	45.19%	879	14.93%	37	0.63%	-350	-5.94%	5,888
Glascock	316	31.19%	516	50.94%	180	17.77%	1	0.10%	-200	-19.75%	1,013
Glynn	8,581	37.42%	11,242	49.02%	3,053	13.31%	56	0.24%	-2,661	-11.60%	22,932
Gordon	4,103	36.59%	5,265	46.95%	1,818	16.21%	27	0.24%	-1,162	-10.36%	11,213
Grady	2,520	41.77%	2,370	39.28%	1,126	18.66%	17	0.28%	150	2.49%	6,033
Greene	2,259	55.67%	1,307	32.21%	483	11.90%	9	0.22%	952	23.46%	4,058
Gwinnett	44,253	29.39%	81,822	54.34%	23,926	15.89%	575	0.38%	-37,569	-24.95%	150,576
Habersham	3,098	33.92%	4,569	50.02%	1,444	15.81%	23	0.25%	-1,471	-16.10%	9,134
Hall	11,214	34.58%	16,108	49.67%	5,043	15.55%	68	0.21%	-4,894	-15.09%	32,433
Hancock	2,461	77.95%	506	16.03%	189	5.99%	1	0.03%	1,955	61.92%	3,157
Haralson	3,281	43.05%	3,142	41.23%	1,167	15.31%	31	0.41%	139	1.82%	7,621
Harris	2,679	38.49%	3,316	47.64%	954	13.71%	11	0.16%	-637	-9.15%	6,960
Hart	3,614	47.50%	2,607	34.26%	1,376	18.08%	12	0.16%	1,007	13.24%	7,609
Heard	1,456	44.49%	1,190	36.36%	617	18.85%	10	0.31%	266	8.13%	3,273
Henry	7,817	32.19%	12,634	52.03%	3,769	15.52%	64	0.26%	-4,817	-19.84%	24,284
Houston	12,270	37.47%	14,119	43.11%	6,263	19.12%	96	0.29%	-1,849	-5.64%	32,748
Irwin	1,366	48.44%	973	34.50%	465	16.49%	16	0.57%	393	13.94%	2,820
Jackson	3,792	41.37%	3,976	43.38%	1,381	15.07%	16	0.17%	-184	-2.01%	9,165
Jasper	1,485	49.12%	1,153	38.14%	373	12.34%	12	0.40%	332	10.98%	3,023
Jeff Davis	2,031	41.01%	1,947	39.32%	958	19.35%	16	0.32%	84	1.69%	4,952
Jefferson	3,220	53.77%	2,077	34.68%	685	11.44%	7	0.12%	1,143	19.09%	5,989
Jenkins	1,401	51.36%	929	34.05%	394	14.44%	4	0.15%	472	17.31%	2,728
Johnson	1,473	44.70%	1,314	39.88%	502	15.24%	6	0.18%	159	4.82%	3,295
Jones	3,338	45.86%	2,770	38.05%	1,159	15.92%	12	0.16%	568	7.81%	7,279
Lamar	2,065	46.83%	1,707	38.71%	600	13.61%	38	0.86%	358	8.12%	4,410
Lanier	811	47.34%	600	35.03%	298	17.40%	4	0.23%	211	12.31%	1,713
Laurens	6,184	43.99%	6,146	43.72%	1,602	11.39%	127	0.90%	38	0.27%	14,059
Lee	1,811	30.65%	3,061	51.81%	1,024	17.33%	12	0.20%	-1,250	-21.16%	5,908
Liberty	3,853	48.80%	2,832	35.87%	1,176	14.90%	34	0.43%	1,021	12.93%	7,895
Lincoln	1,327	44.86%	1,149	38.84%	479	16.19%	3	0.10%	178	6.02%	2,958
Long	874	44.66%	719	36.74%	355	18.14%	9	0.46%	155	7.92%	1,957
Lowndes	9,019	40.64%	10,276	46.30%	2,864	12.91%	33	0.15%	-1,257	-5.66%	22,192
Lumpkin	2,010	39.91%	1,972	39.16%	1,035	20.55%	19	0.38%	38	0.75%	5,036
McDuffie	2,640	40.82%	2,955	45.69%	860	13.30%	13	0.20%	-315	-4.87%	6,468
McIntosh	1,925	54.73%	1,027	29.20%	550	15.64%	15	0.43%	898	25.53%	3,517
Macon	2,491	65.45%	944	24.80%	363	9.54%	8	0.21%	1,547	40.65%	3,806
Madison	2,393	34.72%	3,351	48.61%	1,129	16.38%	20	0.29%	-958	-13.89%	6,893
Marion	1,145	55.69%	711	34.58%	198	9.63%	2	0.10%	434	21.11%	2,056
Meriwether	4,002	54.67%	2,364	32.30%	942	12.87%	12	0.16%	1,638	22.37%	7,320
Miller	934	42.13%	826	37.26%	455	20.52%	2	0.09%	108	4.87%	2,217
Mitchell	3,052	52.67%	1,917	33.08%	818	14.12%	8	0.14%	1,135	19.59%	5,795
Monroe	2,774	44.97%	2,423	39.28%	949	15.39%	22	0.36%	351	5.69%	6,168
Montgomery	1,185	45.28%	1,009	38.56%	416	15.90%	7	0.27%	176	6.72%	2,617
Morgan	2,057	46.17%	1,797	40.34%	596	13.38%	5	0.11%	260	5.83%	4,455
Murray	2,764	38.31%	3,256	45.13%	1,186	16.44%	8	0.11%	-492	-6.82%	7,214
Muscogee	25,476	49.68%	21,386	41.70%	4,327	8.44%	91	0.18%	4,090	7.98%	51,280
Newton	5,811	42.54%	5,804	42.49%	1,998	14.63%	46	0.34%	7	0.05%	13,659
Oconee	2,745	33.99%	4,125	51.08%	1,182	14.64%	24	0.30%	-1,380	-17.09%	8,076
Oglethorpe	1,491	40.26%	1,590	42.94%	620	16.74%	2	0.05%	-99	-2.68%	3,703
Paulding	5,212	34.54%	7,180	47.59%	2,654	17.59%	42	0.28%	-1,968	-13.05%	15,088
Peach	3,677	52.73%	2,327	33.37%	947	13.58%	22	0.32%	1,350	19.36%	6,973
Pickens	2,359	41.04%	2,332	40.57%	1,037	18.04%	20	0.35%	27	0.47%	5,748
Pierce	1,852	41.41%	1,899	42.46%	708	15.83%	13	0.29%	-47	-1.05%	4,472
Pike	1,651	40.23%	1,822	44.40%	623	15.18%	8	0.19%	-171	-4.17%	4,104
Polk	4,872	45.67%	4,158	38.98%	1,598	14.98%	40	0.37%	714	6.69%	10,668
Pulaski	1,756	50.88%	1,075	31.15%	614	17.79%	6	0.17%	681	19.73%	3,451
Putnam	2,149	45.78%	1,756	37.41%	775	16.51%	14	0.30%	393	8.37%	4,694
Quitman	523	56.72%	284	30.80%	113	12.26%	2	0.22%	239	25.92%	922
Rabun	1,878	40.63%	1,902	41.15%	825	17.85%	17	0.37%	-24	-0.52%	4,622
Randolph	1,756	59.34%	887	29.98%	315	10.65%	1	0.03%	869	29.36%	2,959
Richmond	28,910	48.57%	24,227	40.70%	6,290	10.57%	96	0.16%	4,683	7.87%	59,523
Rockdale	7,003	30.86%	11,945	52.64%	3,664	16.15%	78	0.34%	-4,942	-21.78%	22,690
Schley	601	46.37%	511	39.43%	180	13.89%	4	0.31%	90	6.94%	1,296
Screven	1,940	44.43%	1,705	39.05%	709	16.24%	12	0.27%	235	5.38%	4,366
Seminole	1,193	47.36%	850	33.74%	468	18.58%	8	0.32%	343	13.62%	2,519
Spalding	6,392	40.63%	7,262	46.15%	2,044	12.99%	36	0.23%	-870	-5.52%	15,734
Stephens	2,976	35.04%	4,047	47.65%	1,448	17.05%	22	0.26%	-1,071	-12.61%	8,493
Stewart	1,540	52.94%	1,186	40.77%	175	6.02%	8	0.28%	354	12.17%	2,909
Sumter	4,489	48.96%	3,616	39.44%	1,046	11.41%	17	0.19%	873	9.52%	9,168
Talbot	1,768	65.92%	671	25.02%	238	8.87%	5	0.19%	1,097	40.90%	2,682
Taliaferro	755	68.26%	269	24.32%	80	7.23%	2	0.18%	486	43.94%	1,106
Tattnall	2,360	39.72%	2,566	43.18%	996	16.76%	20	0.34%	-206	-3.46%	5,942
Taylor	1,508	52.51%	1,078	37.53%	281	9.78%	5	0.17%	430	14.98%	2,872
Telfair	2,238	53.39%	1,324	31.58%	613	14.62%	17	0.41%	914	21.81%	4,192
Terrell	1,942	55.90%	1,143	32.90%	384	11.05%	5	0.14%	799	23.00%	3,474
Thomas	4,841	40.52%	5,500	46.03%	1,591	13.32%	16	0.13%	-659	-5.51%	11,948
Tift	3,930	41.07%	4,485	46.87%	1,139	11.90%	15	0.16%	-555	-5.80%	9,569
Toombs	2,648	35.35%	3,609	48.18%	1,210	16.15%	23	0.31%	-961	-12.83%	7,490
Towns	1,487	40.15%	1,674	45.19%	537	14.50%	6	0.16%	-187	-5.04%	3,704
Treutlen	1,116	47.61%	898	38.31%	318	13.57%	12	0.51%	218	9.30%	2,344
Troup	6,412	37.63%	8,118	47.64%	2,488	14.60%	21	0.12%	-1,706	-10.01%	17,039
Turner	1,669	55.19%	936	30.95%	370	12.24%	49	1.62%	733	24.24%	3,024
Twiggs	2,097	61.82%	853	25.15%	432	12.74%	10	0.29%	1,244	36.67%	3,392
Union	2,304	40.74%	2,533	44.78%	804	14.21%	15	0.27%	-229	-4.04%	5,656
Upson	3,740	41.55%	4,053	45.03%	1,186	13.18%	22	0.24%	-313	-3.48%	9,001
Walker	6,217	35.55%	8,489	48.54%	2,748	15.71%	34	0.19%	-2,272	-12.99%	17,488
Walton	4,821	38.91%	5,619	45.35%	1,923	15.52%	28	0.23%	-798	-6.44%	12,391
Ware	4,573	43.87%	4,573	43.87%	1,263	12.12%	15	0.14%	0	0.00%	10,424
Warren	1,239	56.97%	751	34.53%	180	8.28%	5	0.23%	488	22.44%	2,175
Washington	3,508	52.16%	2,384	35.45%	820	12.19%	13	0.19%	1,124	16.71%	6,725
Wayne	3,052	40.41%	3,381	44.77%	1,107	14.66%	12	0.16%	-329	-4.36%	7,552
Webster	600	65.86%	208	22.83%	103	11.31%	0	0.00%	392	43.03%	911
Wheeler	880	51.80%	601	35.37%	214	12.60%	4	0.24%	279	16.43%	1,699
White	1,756	33.58%	2,477	47.37%	981	18.76%	15	0.29%	-721	-13.79%	5,229
Whitfield	7,335	32.98%	12,003	53.97%	2,866	12.89%	35	0.16%	-4,668	-20.99%	22,239
Wilcox	1,365	50.13%	916	33.64%	433	15.90%	9	0.33%	449	16.49%	2,723
Wilkes	1,955	49.34%	1,535	38.74%	464	11.71%	8	0.20%	420	10.60%	3,962
Wilkinson	2,286	56.14%	1,232	30.26%	520	12.77%	34	0.83%	1,054	25.88%	4,072
Worth	2,578	44.17%	2,344	40.16%	905	15.50%	10	0.17%	234	4.01%	5,837
Totals	1,008,966	43.47%	995,252	42.88%	309,657	13.34%	7,258	0.31%	13,714	0.59%	2,321,133

==== Counties that flipped from Republican to Democratic ====
- Atkinson
- Bacon
- Baldwin
- Ben Hill
- Berrien
- Bibb
- Bleckley
- Brantley
- Brooks
- Burke
- Butts
- Candler
- Chattahoochee
- Chattooga
- Clayton
- Cook
- Crisp
- Decatur
- Dodge
- Dougherty
- Early
- Elbert
- Emanuel
- Franklin
- Grady
- Haralson
- Hart
- Heard
- Irwin
- Jasper
- Jeff Davis
- Jefferson
- Jenkins
- Johnson
- Jones
- Lamar
- Lanier
- Laurens
- Liberty
- Lincoln
- Long
- Lumpkin
- Meriwether
- Miller
- Mitchell
- Monroe
- Montgomery
- Morgan
- Muscogee
- Newton
- Pickens
- Polk
- Putnam
- Richmond
- Schley
- Screven
- Seminole
- Sumter
- Taylor
- Telfair
- Terrell
- Treutlen
- Turner
- Ware (tied in 1992)
- Washington
- Wheeler
- Wilcox
- Wilkes
- Worth

== Works cited ==
- Moreland, Laurence; Steed, Robert; Baker, Tod, eds. (1991). The 1988 Presidential Election in the South: Continuity Amidst Change in Southern Party Politics. Praeger Publishers. ISBN 0275931455.
- Steed, Robert; Moreland, Laurence; Baker, Tod, eds. (1994). The 1992 Presidential Election in the South: Current Patterns of Southern Party and Electoral Politics. Praeger Publishers. ISBN 0275945340.
