= Bob Shaw (Georgia politician) =

American politician and singer (1929–2024)

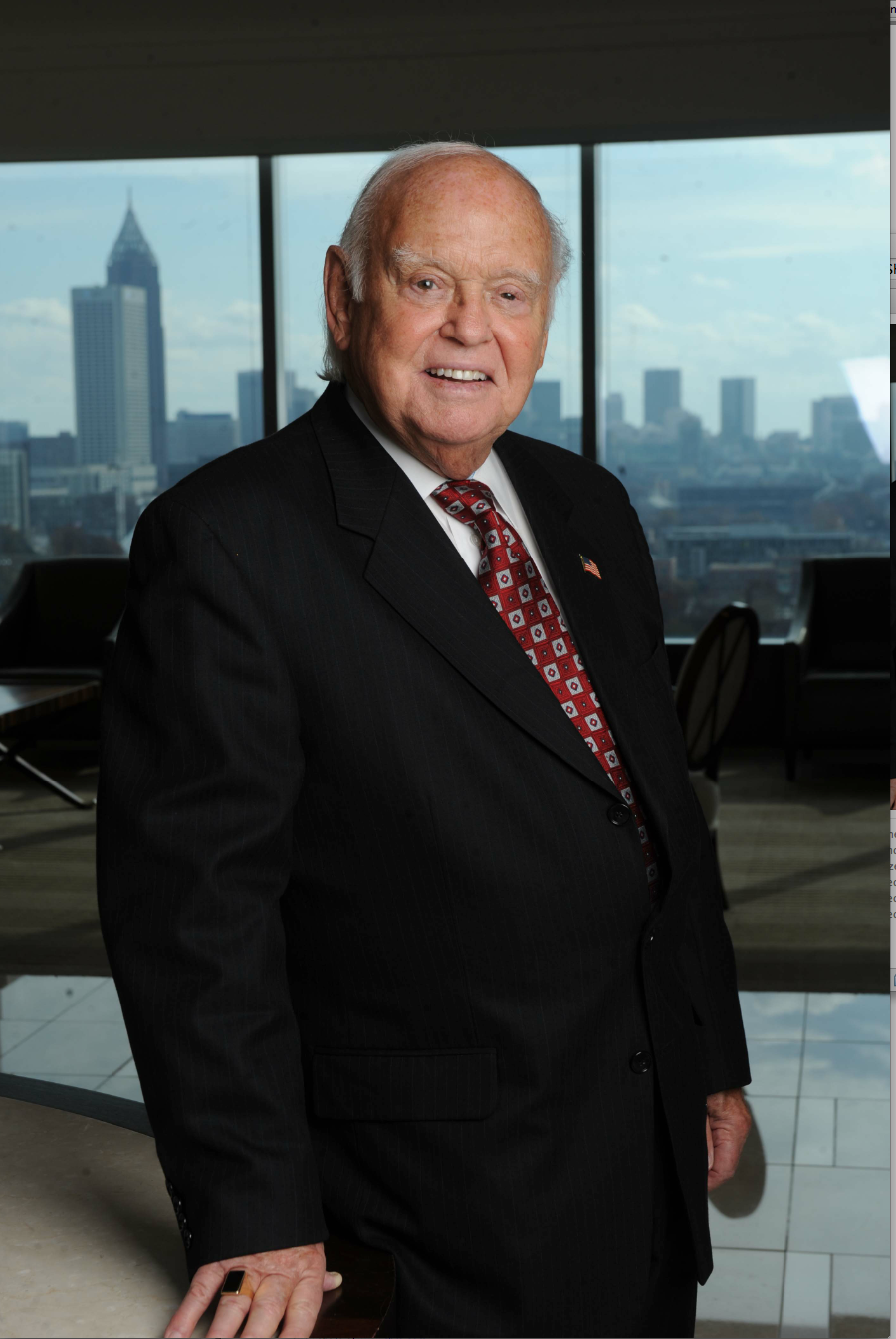

Chairman of the Georgia Republican Party
- In office 1971–1975
- Preceded by: Wiley Wasden
- Succeeded by: Mack Mattingly

Vice Chairman of the Republican National Committee
- In office 1972–1975

Chairman of the Development Authority of Fulton County
- In office 2008–2019

Personal details
- Born: August 21, 1929 Bronwood, Georgia, U.S.
- Died: February 27, 2024 (aged 94) Atlanta, Georgia, U.S.
- Party: Republican
- Spouse: Elaine Smith
- Education: Georgia State University
- Musical career
- Genres: Gospel
- Instrument: Vocals
- Formerly of: The Homeland Harmony Quartet, The Revelaires Quartet, The Harmoneers Quartet, The Sunshine Boys

Robert Jennings Shaw (August 21, 1929 – February 27, 2024) was an American gospel music singer and political leader. He was a two time inductee into the Georgia Music Hall of Fame, as well as the Atlanta Country Music Hall of Fame.

As a political leader for more than thirty years, Shaw served multiple terms as Vice Chairman of the Republican National Committee, as Chairman of the Georgia Republican Party, and as Chairman of the Fulton County Republican Party. Under his leadership, Shaw recruited multiple future elected officials from the state of Georgia, United States to run for office including Paul Coverdell and Newt Gingrich.

== Early life ==
Bob Shaw was born to Robert Edwards Shaw and Vesta (Jennings) Shaw in Bronwood, Georgia in Terrell County, Georgia. During the Great Depression, his father worked as a sharecropper, service station owner, and mechanic before moving the family to Marietta, Georgia in 1934.

Shaw's religious life in his youth was shaped by the influence of his mother who maintained a devoutly Christian household. His parents would take him to gospel music shows where he developed a passion for music and singing. Through the exposure to music, he learned how to read the shape notes in hymnals before he learned how to read words.

In 1946, Shaw graduated from Marietta High School (Georgia) where he competed in American football and baseball. Upon graduating, he attended the Georgia Institute of Technology, where he was a member of the 1947 Georgia Tech baseball team. After leaving the baseball team, he transferred to The University of Georgia in Atlanta, now Georgia State University.

After graduating from high school, Shaw joined the Georgia Air National Guard, where he was a member of the 116th Air Force Group at Dobbins Air Reserve Base. At the outbreak of the Korean War, he was placed on active duty on October 18, 1950, where he would remain for the next three years. During the Korean War, Shaw was stationed at Misawa Air Base in Misawa, Japan, on the northern end of the Honshu Island, working as an administrator at a military hospital, achieving the rank of Sergeant Major.

== Gospel music career ==
In 1949, Shaw became the lead singer of The Homeland Harmony Quartet Southern gospel group. He estimated that he and his fellow musicians traveled, "as many as 100,000 miles on the road in a single year," in a 1948 Packard station wagon.

In 1952, after returning from the Korean War, Shaw became the lead singer of the newly formed The Revelaires Quartet, formed in Atlanta, along with Dan Huskey, Tommy Rainer, "Big" Jim Waits, and Jerry Briggs. In 1953, while performing a show on the same bill as The Jordanaires, who became famous as the backup band for Elvis Presley, The Jordanaires asked Shaw to become a permanent member of the band, but he declined. In 1955, after The Revelaires appeared on the television show Arthur Godfrey and His Friends, Shaw departed the band to spend more time with his family.

In 1956, Shaw became the director of music at First Baptist Chattahoochee in the Whittier Mill Village neighborhood of Atlanta. He served in his position of Minister of Music for nearly sixty years until December 28, 2015.

In 1992, Shaw joined The Harmoneers Quartet following the death of the group's founding member Fred Calvin Maples. The Harmoneers Quartet, which had been formed in 1943 in Knoxville, Tennessee, had been one of the most successful gospel music acts in the South for more than four decades. In 1996, Shaw joined The Sunshine Boys, a long-running Georgia based gospel group that had originally formed in 1938.

In 2002, Shaw was inducted into the Georgia Music Hall of Fame for his work with The Harmoneers Quartet, and again in 2005 for his work with The Sunshine Boys. In 2006, he was inducted into the Atlanta Country Music Hall of Fame.

== Political career ==
In 1961, Shaw met future state legislator Rodney Mims Cook Sr. Cook and future federal court judge Richard Cameron Freeman who were attempting to build an organized state Republican Party. Shaw credited Cook with taking him to the Fulton County Republican Party headquarters and demanding that they, "Put him to work."

Shaw credited the 1964 United States presidential election in Georgia campaign of Barry Goldwater with giving the Georgia Republican Party the motivation to better organize as a party. That same year, he ran an unsuccessful campaign for the Georgia State Senate against future United States District Court for the Northern District of Georgia judge Horace Ward. Shaw stated the loss in the campaign taught him that the Republican Party needed to do a better job of connecting with voters and getting them out to vote.

The 1966 Georgia gubernatorial election was the first time since the Reconstruction era that the Georgia Republican Party nominated a gubernatorial candidate. That same year, Shaw was elected as the First Vice Chairman of the Fulton County Republican Party, and in 1968, he was elected to his first term as Chairman of the Fulton County Republican Party. Shaw would eventually serve six terms as county party chairman between 1968 and 1998.

In 1971, Shaw began his first term as Chairman of the Georgia Republican Party following the resignation of the previous chairman, Wiley Wasden. Shaw convinced the party leadership to amend the party bylaws to elect chairmen in off-election years so they could have time to implement a campaign strategy. It was during these years that he began a long-term friendship with former U.S. Representative and Secretary of the Army Bo Callaway. Callaway was the first Republican elected to serve in the U.S. Congress from Georgia since Reconstruction.

In 1972, Shaw's first full year as Chairman of the Georgia Republican Party, the party achieved their greatest success in state elections since Reconstruction when Republican candidates won more than 100 state and local elections in Georgia. During the 1972 United States presidential election in Georgia, more than 75% of the state of Georgia voted for Richard Nixon as President of the United States. Future Democratic Governor of Georgia Zell Miller credited Shaw's connection with the common voter to the growing success of the Republican Party by stating, "Bob speaks the language of the service station operator."

In 1972, Shaw was selected as Vice Chairman to the Republican National Committee, serving alongside future President of the United States, and then Chair of the Republican Party, George H. W. Bush. This role gave Shaw tremendous influence within the national party. He was described as, "The President's Man in the Southeast insofar as Party matters are concerned."

During Shaw's years leading the state party, he recruited future members of the U.S. House of Representatives Paul Coverdell and Newt Gingrich to run for public office. In 1970, he recruited Coverdell, also in the insurance industry, to run for the Georgia State Senate where he won a seat representing northern Fulton County. In 1974, Gingrich, a history professor from West Georgia College, ran for the Georgia's 6th congressional district.

In 1998, the Georgia Republican Party honored Shaw with the Pioneer Award. In 2006, he was named as the Chairman Emeritus of the Fulton County Republican Party. In a 2019 letter, former Georgia Speaker of the House of Representatives David Ralston mentioned of Shaw, "When they write the history of the Republican Party in modern Georgia, many will be chapters based on you and your work."

In 1993, Shaw was selected to join the board of directors for the Development Authority of Fulton County. In 2008, he was elected to serve as Chairman of the Board of Directors for the Development Authority of Fulton County. He served in that role until his retirement in 2019.

During his time at Chairman of the Development Authority of Fulton County, Shaw was selected to serve as the Chairman of the Joint Development Authority of Metropolitan Atlanta. He was also a member of the board of directors for the Georgia Chamber of Commerce.

== Personal life ==
Shaw became engaged to Elaine Smith, a fashion model, on October 1, 1950. Nine days later he was drafted into the Korean War. The two were married on Christmas Day, 1950. Together they had four daughters and were married until her death in 2016.

From 1974, Shaw and his family lived in the Atlanta suburb of Sandy Springs, Georgia. He enjoyed reading during his free time, and frequently devoted time to Bible study. His favorite book in his youth was Think and Grow Rich by Napoleon Hill, which he credited with having a transformational influence on him during his years as a young businessman.

Shaw died on February 27, 2024, at the age of 94.
