= 1980 United States Senate election in Georgia =

- November 4, 1980
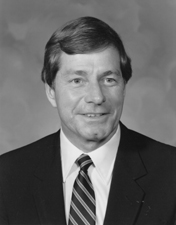

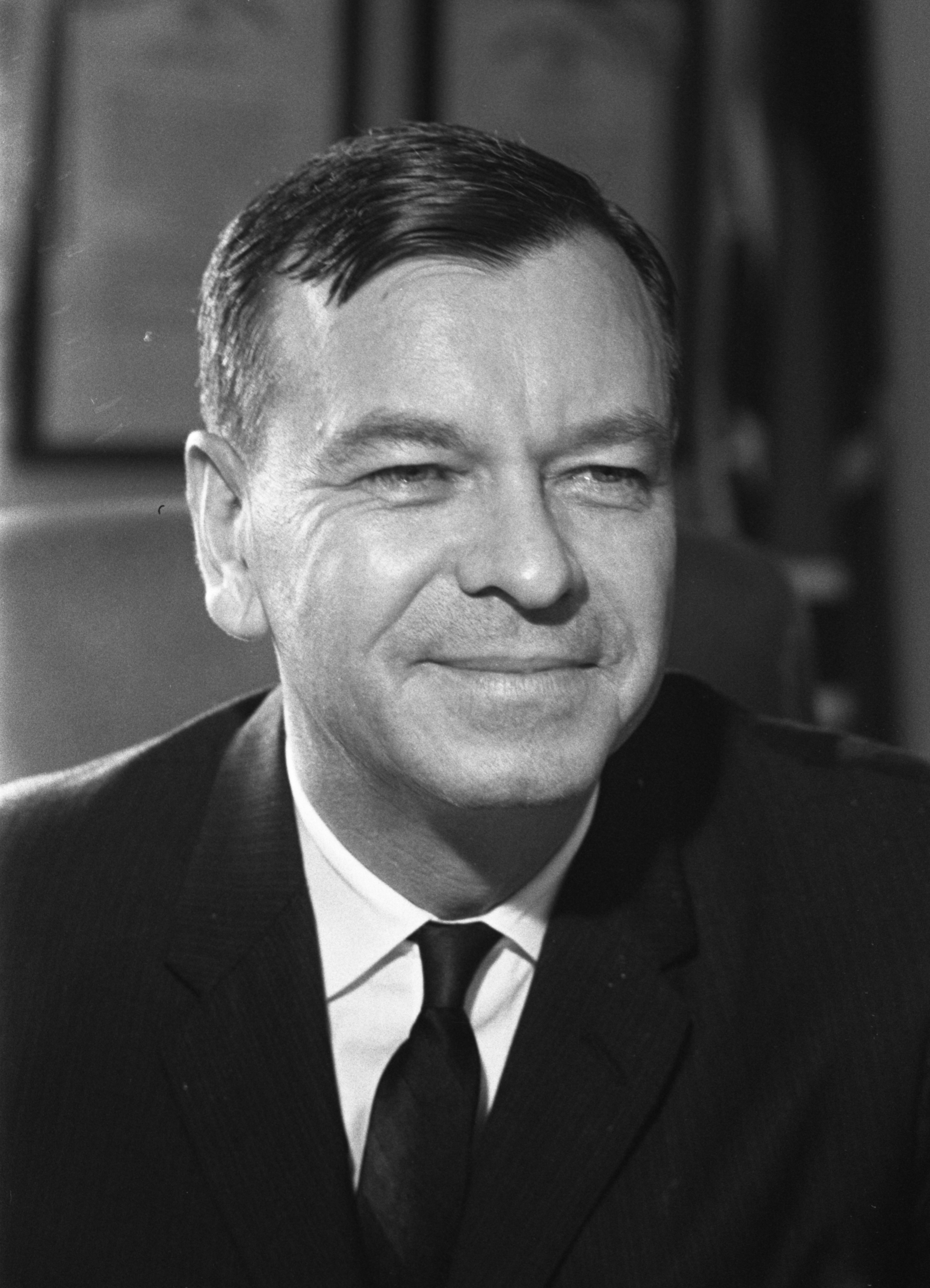
Nominee	Mack Mattingly	Herman Talmadge
Party	Republican	Democratic
Popular vote	803,686	776,143
Percentage	50.87%	49.13%
- County results Mattingly: 50–60% 60–70% 70–80% Talmadge: 50–60% 60–70% 70–80% 80–90%
U.S. senator before election
Herman Talmadge
Democratic
Elected U.S. Senator
Mack Mattingly
Republican

The 1980 United States Senate election in Georgia was held on November 4, 1980. Democratic incumbent Herman Talmadge ran for re-election to a fifth term in office but lost narrowly to Mack Mattingly.

Mattingly benefited considerably from Talmadge's ethical and legal problems. Mattingly became the first Republican senator from the state since the Reconstruction era in 1873 and the first Republican senator elected from Georgia by direct election.

As of 2026, this is the last time any Democratic incumbent senator lost while the Democratic presidential nominee carried the state's electoral votes on the same day. (Note: In 1992, Bill Clinton carried the electoral votes of Georgia, but incumbent Democratic Senator Wyche Fowler lost re-election. However, this did not occur on the same day as the presidential election. In fact, Fowler won the popular vote by a margin of 49% to 48% in the first round, which was simultaneous with the presidential election. However, because no candidate achieved >50% of the vote, a runoff was required, which the Democrat lost 51% to 49% on November 24, three weeks later.) This is also the only Senate election (as of 2026) in which the Republican carried Fulton County in its current form and the first of three consecutive elections for this seat in which the incumbent was defeated.

== Democratic primary ==
=== Candidates ===
==== Declared ====
- John Francis Collins
- Dawson Mathis, U.S. representative from Albany
- Zell Miller, lieutenant governor of Georgia
- J. B. Stoner, white supremacist and terrorist
- Herman Talmadge, incumbent U.S. senator since 1957
- Norman Underwood, judge of the Georgia Court of Appeals

=== Campaign ===
Talmadge's ethical issues made him uniquely vulnerable, especially after being censured in 1979. Because Georgia was seen as a strongly Democratic state, five primary opponents declared their candidacies for the Democratic nomination. Strongest among these candidates was Lieutenant Governor Zell Miller. Miller launched his campaign with support from black voters, organized labor, and the liberal wing of the Georgia Democratic Party. He campaigned against Talmadge on the argument that Talmadge had "disgraced" Georgia. Miller also attacked Talmadge's history as a segregationist and boasted of support from black leaders including Atlanta mayor Maynard Jackson and State Senator Julian Bond.

In the six-man primary held August 5, Miller and Talmadge advanced to a run-off election. Talmadge won the run-off election with 58.6% of the vote.

=== Results ===
Democratic primary results
Party	Candidate	Votes	%
Democratic	Herman Talmadge (incumbent)	432,215	41.99%
Democratic	Zell Miller	247,766	24.07%
Democratic	Norman Underwood	183,683	17.85%
Democratic	Dawson Mathis	133,729	12.99%
Democratic	J. B. Stoner	19,664	1.91%
Democratic	John F. Collins	12,243	1.19%
Total votes		1,029,300	100.00%

Democratic primary runoff results
Party	Candidate	Votes	%
Democratic	Herman Talmadge (incumbent)	559,615	58.58%
Democratic	Zell Miller	395,773	41.43%
Total votes		955,388	100.00%

== Republican primary ==
=== Candidates ===
- Mack Mattingly, businessman and chair of the Georgia Republican Party

Mattingly was unopposed for the Republican nomination.

== General election ==
=== Candidates ===
- Mack Mattingly, businessman and chair of the Georgia Republican Party (Republican)
- Herman Talmadge, incumbent U.S. senator since 1957 (Democratic)

=== Results ===
1980 United States Senate election, Georgia
Party	Candidate	Votes	%	±%
Republican	Mack Mattingly	803,686	50.87%	+22.63%
Democratic	Herman Talmadge (incumbent)	776,143	49.13%	−22.63%
Majority		27,543	1.74%	−41.78%
Turnout		1,579,829		
Republican gain from Democratic		Swing	22.63%	

== See also ==
- 1980 United States Senate elections
