= 2000 United States Senate special election in Georgia =

- November 7, 2000
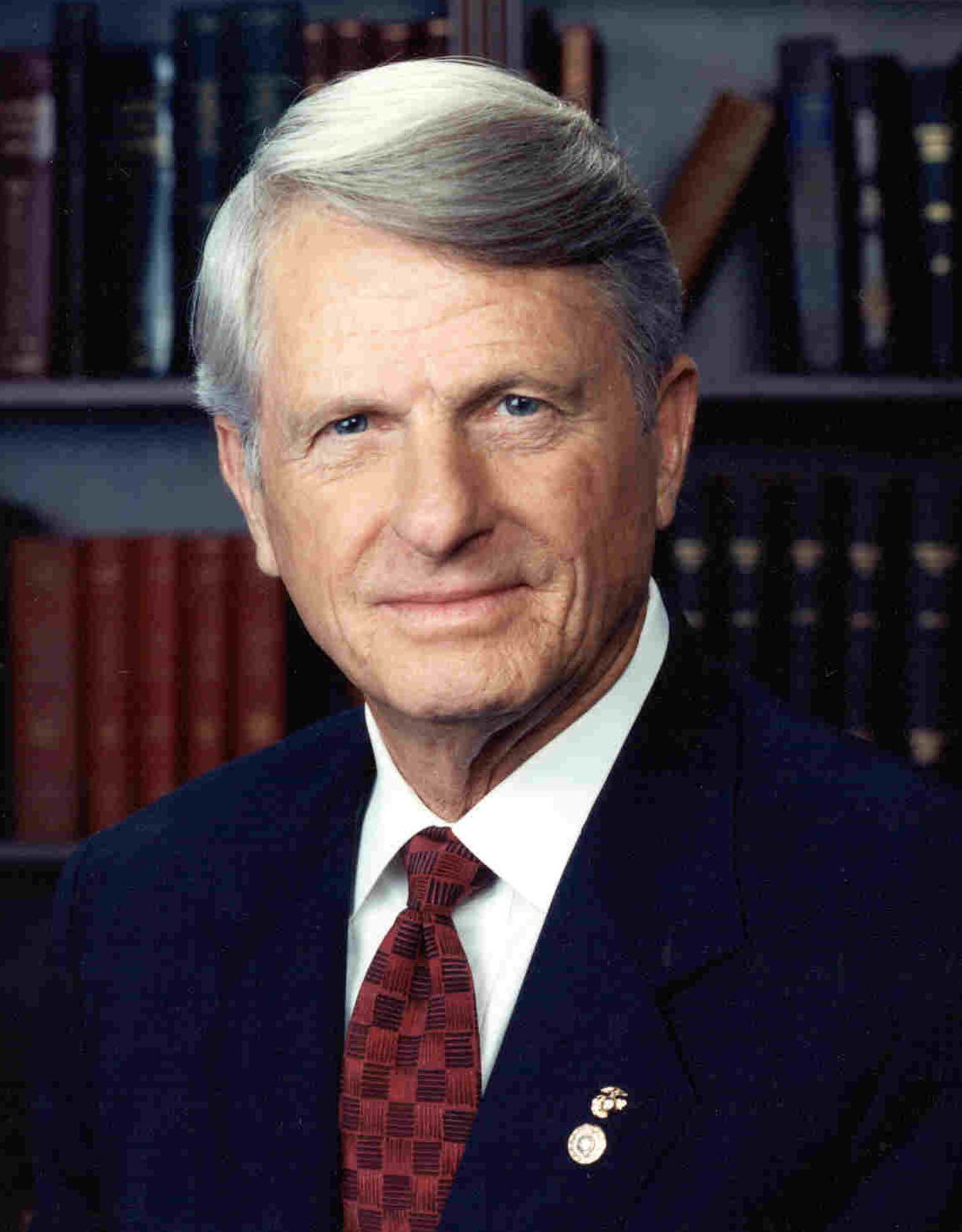

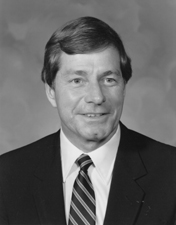
Nominee	Zell Miller	Mack Mattingly
Party	Democratic	Republican
Popular vote	1,413,224	920,478
Percentage	58.19%	37.90%
- Miller: 40–50% 50–60% 60–70% 70–80% 80–90% >90% Mattingly: 40–50% 50–60% 60–70% 70–80% Tie: 40–50% 50% No data
U.S. senator before election
Zell Miller (Note: In July 2000, Miller was appointed by Governor Roy Barnes to fill the vacancy caused by the death of Senator Paul Coverdell.)
Democratic
Elected U.S. Senator
Zell Miller
Democratic

The 2000 United States Senate special election in Georgia was held on November 7, 2000, to complete the unexpired term of the late Paul Coverdell. Appointed Democratic incumbent Zell Miller won over Republican former senator Mack Mattingly in a landslide of over 20 points, carrying 149 of the state's 159 counties.

Although this race was held on a nonpartisan basis, the Democratic Party would not win a U.S. Senate seat in Georgia again until 2021, when Raphael Warnock won a special election to fill the same seat and Jon Ossoff won the regular election for the state's Class 2 seat. Until Ossoff was elected to a second term in 2026, this was the last time a Democrat won a Senate race in the state by double digits.

== Background ==
Republican incumbent Paul Coverdell died suddenly of a cerebral hemorrhage on July 17, 2000. Democratic governor Roy Barnes appointed Democratic former governor Zell Miller to fill the vacant seat until a successor could be elected. A special election to fill the remainder of Coverdell's term was scheduled for November 7, concurrent with regularly scheduled elections.

== Candidates ==
Under Georgia election law at the time, the special election would be non-partisan. Each candidate ran without a party label; the parties listed below are those with which the candidate would have run if given the opportunity:

- Ben Ballenger (Republican)
- Jeff Gates (Green)
- Paul Robert MacGregor (Libertarian)
- Mack Mattingly, former ambassador to Seychelles and former U.S. senator (Republican)
- Zell Miller, incumbent U.S. senator and former governor (Democratic)
- Winnie Walsh (Independent)
- Bobby Wood (Republican)

== Campaign ==
One of the biggest campaign issues was Social Security; Miller attacked Mattingly for supporting a raise in the eligible age. Mattingly fought back by connecting Miller to Massachusetts senator Ted Kennedy and for a vote to block legislation aimed at protecting Social Security.

Mattingly sought to gain support by tying the campaign to the concurrent presidential election. He said he would vote for the Republican nominee, Texas governor George W. Bush, who was very popular in the state, and challenged Miller to publicly state which presidential candidate he supported. Miller conceded he would vote for Democratic vice president Al Gore, because as governor, Miller had worked with Gore on drought relief, welfare reform, and the 1996 Summer Olympics, though he contended that this "does not mean I agree with all of his policies."

In early October, a poll showed Miller leading with 59% of the vote, despite the fact that Bush was leading Gore in the state by a double-digit margin.

=== Debates ===
- Complete video of debate, October 15, 2000

=== Polling ===
Poll source	Date(s)	Sample size	Margin of error	Zell Miller (D)	Mack Mattingly (R)	Other / undecided (Note: Calculated by taking the difference of 100% and all other candidates combined.)
Harris Insights & Analytics	November 3, 2000	6,862	—	57%	40%	3%
Marketing Workshop	October 29, 2000	512 (Note: Average of multiple versions or turnout models listed in the poll.)	—	55%	32%	13%
Rasmussen Reports	October 22, 2000	1,029	—	53%	36%	11%

== Results ==
General election results
Party	Candidate	Votes	%	±%
Nonpartisan	Zell Miller (incumbent)	1,413,224	58.19%	+13.04%
Nonpartisan	Mack Mattingly	920,478	37.90%	−14.47%
Nonpartisan	Paul Robert MacGregor	25,942	1.07%	−1.41%
Nonpartisan	Ben Ballenger	22,975	0.95%	+0.95%
Nonpartisan	Jeff Gates	21,249	0.88%	+0.88%
Nonpartisan	Bobby Wood	12,499	0.51%	+0.51%
Nonpartisan	Winnie Walsh	11,875	0.49%	+0.49%
Majority		492,746	20.29%	+13.07%
Total votes		2,428,242	100.00%	0.00%
Democratic hold				

=== Counties that flipped from Republican to Democratic ===
- Atkinson (largest city: Pearson)
- Baldwin (largest city: Milledgeville)
- Berrien (largest city: Nashville)
- Brooks (largest city: Quitman)
- Chattooga (largest city: Summerville)
- Clinch (largest city: Homerville)
- Cook (largest city: Adel)
- Crawford (largest city: Roberta)
- Crisp (largest city: Cordele)
- Decatur (largest city: Bainbridge)
- Dodge (largest city: Eastman)
- Emanuel (largest city: Swainsboro)
- Grady (largest city: Cairo)
- Hart (largest city: Hartwell)
- Heard (largest city: Franklin)
- Irwin (largest city: Ocilla)
- Jasper (largest city: Monticello)
- Jenkins (largest city: Millen)
- Johnson (largest city: Wrightsville)
- Lanier (largest city: Lakeland)
- Miller (largest city: Colquitt)
- Montgomery (largest city: Mount Vernon)
- Pulaski (largest city: Hawkinsville)
- Putnam (largest city: Eatonton)
- Schley (largest city: Ellaville)
- Screven (largest city: Sylvania)
- Seminole (largest city: Donalsonville)
- Turner (largest city: Ashburn)
- Wilcox (largest city: Abbeville)
- Cobb (largest city: Marietta)
- Gwinnett (largest city: Peachtree Corners)
- Henry (largest city: Stockbridge)
- Rockdale (largest town: Conyers)
- Bacon (largest town: Alma)
- Banks (largest town: Baldwin)
- Bartow (largest town: Cartersville)
- Bleckley (largest town: Cochran)
- Brantley (largest town: Nahunta)
- Bryan (largest town: Richmond Hill)
- Bulloch (largest town: Stateboro)
- Camden (largest town: St. Marys)
- Candler (largest town: Metter)
- Carroll (largest town: Carrollton)
- Catoosa (largest town: Fort Oglethorpe)
- Charlton (largest town: Folkston)
- Coffee (largest town: Douglas)
- Colquitt (largest town: Moultrie)
- Dade (largest town: Trenton)
- Dawson (largest town: Dawsonville)
- Douglas (largest town: Douglasville)
- Echols (largest town: Statenville)
- Effingham (largest town: Rincon)
- Evans (largest town: Claxton)
- Fannin (largest town: Blue Ridge)
- Floyd (largest town: Rome)
- Franklin (largest town: Lavonia)
- Glascock (largest town: Gibson)
- Gordon (largest town: Calhoun)
- Habersham (largest town: Cornelia)
- Hall (largest town: Gainesville)
- Gilmer (largest town: Ellijay)
- Harris (largest town: Pine Mountain)
- Haralson (largest town: Bremen)
- Houston (largest town: Warner Robins)
- Jones (largest town: Gray)
- Jackson (largest town: Jefferson)
- Jeff Davis (largest town: Hazlehurst)
- Lincoln (largest town: Lincolnton)
- Lowndes (largest town: Valdosta)
- Lumpkin (largest town: Dahlonega)
- Madison (largest town: Comer)
- McDuffie (largest town: Thomson)
- Monroe (largest town: Forsyth)
- Murray (largest town: Chatsworth)
- Newton (largest town: Covington)
- Oconee (largest town: Watkinsville)
- Oglethorpe (largest town: Crawford)
- Paulding (largest town: Dallas)
- Morgan (largest town: Madison)
- Pike (largest town: Zebulon)
- Pickens (largest town: Jasper)
- Rabun (largest town: Clayton)
- Spalding (largest town: Griffin)
- Stephens (largest town: Toccoa)
- Tattnall (largest town: Glennville)
- Tifton (largest town: Tifton)
- Towns (largest town: Young Harris)
- Troup (largest town: LaGrange)
- Union (largest town: Blairsville)
- Upson (largest town: Thomaston)
- Walton (largest town: Monroe)
- Ware (largest town: Waycross)
- Walker (largest town: Lafayette)
- Wayne (largest town: Jesup)
- White (largest town: Cleveland)
- Whitfield (largest town: Dalton)
- Worth (largest town: Sylvester)
- Appling (largest town: Baxley)
- Thomas (largest town: Thomasville)
- Laurens (largest town: Dublin)

== See also ==
- 2000 United States Senate elections
