= Volunteer Protection Act =

Volunteer Protection Act of 1997
- Long title: An Act to provide certain protections to volunteers, nonprofit organizations, and governmental entities in lawsuits based on the activities of volunteers.
- Enacted by: the 105th United States Congress

Citations
- Public law: Pub. L. 105-19
- Statutes at Large: 111 Stat. 218

Legislative history
- Introduced in the Senate as S. 543 by Paul Coverdell on April 9, 1997; Signed into law by President Bill Clinton on June 18, 1997

The federal Volunteer Protection Act of 1997 (the VPA or the Act) aims to promote volunteerism by limiting, and in many cases completely eliminating, a volunteer's risk of tort liability when acting for nonprofit organizations or government entities. The act states that “No volunteer of a nonprofit organization or governmental entity shall be liable for harm caused by an act or omission of the volunteer on behalf of the organization or entity if the volunteer was acting within its scope of the volunteer’s responsibilities in the nonprofit organization or governmental entity at the time of the act or omission.”

== Introduction ==
People who volunteer to assist nonprofit organizations or government agencies or programs run the risk that their actions, while well-intentioned, may cause harm to another. If those actions are deemed negligent, the volunteer may face civil liability for damages caused by the negligent conduct.
