= Wyche Fowler =

American politician and ambassador (born 1940)

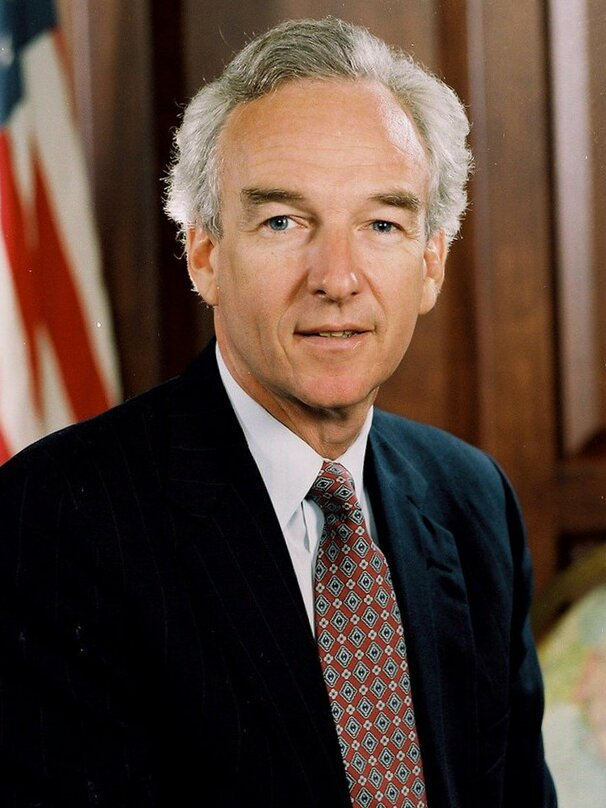
- Official portrait, c. 1990

22nd United States Ambassador to Saudi Arabia
- In office September 14, 1996 – March 1, 2001
- President: Bill Clinton; George W. Bush
- Preceded by: Ray Mabus
- Succeeded by: Robert W. Jordan

United States Senator from Georgia
- In office January 3, 1987 – January 3, 1993
- Preceded by: Mack Mattingly
- Succeeded by: Paul Coverdell

Member of the U.S. House of Representatives from Georgia's 5th district
- In office April 6, 1977 – January 3, 1987
- Preceded by: Andrew Young
- Succeeded by: John Lewis

President of the Atlanta City Council
- In office January 7, 1974 – 1976
- Preceded by: Maynard Jackson
- Succeeded by: Carl Ware

Personal details
- Born: William Wyche Fowler Jr. October 6, 1940 (age 85) Atlanta, Georgia, U.S.
- Party: Democratic
- Children: 2
- Education: Davidson College (BA); Emory University (JD)

Military service
- Allegiance: United States
- Branch/service: United States Army
- Years of service: 1962–1964

William Wyche Fowler Jr. (/ˈwaɪʃ ˈfaʊlər/; born October 6, 1940) is an American attorney, politician, and diplomat. A member of the Democratic Party, he served as a U.S. Senator from Georgia from 1987 to 1993. He had previously served in the U.S. House of Representatives from 1977 to 1987.

== Early life and education ==
Fowler was born in Atlanta, Georgia. He attended Davidson College, and then served in the United States Army as an intelligence officer. After discharge, he returned to school to earn a J.D. degree from Emory University School of Law.

== Career ==
From 1965 to 1966, Fowler became the chief of staff for Congressman Charles Weltner, and after holding this post for two years, he resigned to become a private attorney. In 1969, he was elected to 5th Ward, Position 2 on the Atlanta Board of Aldermen, and from 1974 to 1976, he served as president of the Atlanta City Council, using this position as a stepping stone to Congress.

=== U.S. Congress ===
On April 5, 1977, Fowler was elected in a special election to the U.S. House of Representatives, to fill the vacancy caused by Andrew Young's resignation upon appointment as US Ambassador to the United Nations. He defeated John Lewis in the election.

In 1986, as a U.S. Representative, Fowler narrowly defeated the incumbent Republican Senator Mack Mattingly. Fowler served as the junior senator from Georgia. Fowler's voting record was liberal on social concerns and moderate on economic and national security issues.

On October 15, 1991, Fowler was one of eleven Democrats who voted to confirm the nomination of Clarence Thomas to the U.S. Supreme Court in a 52–48 vote, the narrowest margin of approval in more than a century.

He unexpectedly lost his re-election bid in 1992 to Georgia state Senator Paul Coverdell (who would later become leader of the state's Republican party). Fowler won a small plurality of the vote against Coverdell on general election night 1992, but Georgia law requires a runoff election between the two candidates with the highest vote totals if no one candidate receives over 50 percent (a majority) of the total vote, and a Libertarian Party candidate received enough votes to keep Fowler's total below 50 percent-plus-one. In the runoff on November 24, 1992, Coverdell upset Fowler by a narrow margin.

The New York Times noted that "he was the key figure in orchestrating a compromise on financing for the National Endowment for the Arts."

=== Post-Congress ===
After his re-election defeat, Fowler was selected to serve as the 22nd United States Ambassador to Saudi Arabia in the Clinton Administration. Ambassador Fowler was criticized in a congressional report following the 9/11 attacks for pressuring consular officers to issue visas in the Kingdom, although the report did not mention him in connection to any particular visa cases of the 9/11 hijackers. Fowler left after George W. Bush took office, and was succeeded by attorney Robert W. Jordan.

After leaving the position, Fowler joined the law firm of Powell, Goldstein, Frazer, and Murphy, and he joined several corporate and academic boards, including those of the Carter Center at Emory University and the Morehouse School of Medicine. He also became board chairman of the Middle East Institute and is a member of the ReFormers Caucus of Issue One.

== Personal life ==
Fowler has been married at least twice. His second marriage in 1990 was to Donna Hulsizer, then the issues director for People for the American Way. He has a daughter and a son.

As of 2019, Fowler lives in Georgia and West University Place, Texas, where he teaches part-time at Rice University.

== Relevant literature ==
- Johnstone, R. William. 2025. Wyche Fowler: A Political Life in Georgia, Congress, and Abroad. Mercer University Press.

U.S. House of Representatives
Preceded by Andrew Young	Member of the U.S. House of Representatives from Georgia's 5th congressional district 1977–1987	Succeeded by John Lewis
U.S. Senate
Preceded by Mack Mattingly	U.S. Senator (Class 3) from Georgia; 1987–1993; Served alongside: Sam Nunn	Succeeded by Paul Coverdell
Party political offices
Preceded by Herman Talmadge	Democratic nominee for U.S. Senator from Georgia (Class 3); 1986, 1992	Succeeded by Michael Coles
Diplomatic posts
Preceded by Ray Mabus	United States Ambassador to Saudi Arabia; 1996–2001	Succeeded by Robert W. Jordan
U.S. order of precedence (ceremonial)
Preceded by Mack Mattingly as Former U.S. Senator	Order of precedence of the United States	Succeeded by David Perdue as Former U.S. Senator
