= Fred Calvin Maples =

Southern Gospel Singer

- Born: 1910
- Died: February 28, 1987 (aged 76–77); Lilburn, Georgia, U.S.
- Resting place: Westview Cemetery
- Occupation: Singer
- Spouse: Inez Wright
- Children: 3 daughters

Fred Calvin Maples (1910 – February 28, 1987) was an American Southern gospel singer and Baptist minister. He was the founder of the Harmoneers Quartet in the 1940s. He later served as the minister of music and education at Pinecrest Baptist Church in Morrow, Georgia. He was inducted into the Southern Gospel Museum and Hall of Fame posthumously in 2003.
