= 1986 United States Senate election in Georgia =

- November 8, 1986
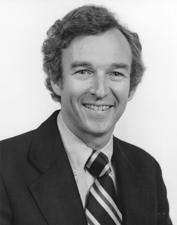

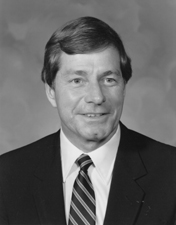
Nominee	Wyche Fowler	Mack Mattingly
Party	Democratic	Republican
Popular vote	623,707	601,241
Percentage	50.92%	49.08%
- Fowler: 50–60% 60–70% 70–80% Mattingly: 50–60% 60–70%
U.S. senator before election
Mack Mattingly
Republican
Elected U.S. Senator
Wyche Fowler
Democratic

The 1986 United States Senate election in Georgia was held on November 4, 1986. Republican incumbent Mack Mattingly ran for re-election to a second term but was narrowly defeated by U.S. representative Wyche Fowler.

This was the last time a Democrat was elected to this seat for a full term until 2022 and the second of three consecutive elections for this seat in which the incumbent was defeated.

== Republican primary ==
=== Candidates ===
- Mack Mattingly, incumbent U.S. Senator

== Democratic primary ==
=== Candidates ===
- Jerry Belsky, supporter of Lyndon LaRouche
- Wyche Fowler, U.S. representative from Atlanta
- Hamilton Jordan, former White House chief of staff
- John D. Russell, former state representative from Winder (1981–85) and nephew of Richard Russell Jr.

=== Results ===
Democratic primary results
Party	Candidate	Votes	%
Democratic	Wyche Fowler	314,787	50.26%
Democratic	Hamilton Jordan	196,307	31.34%
Democratic	John D. Russell	100,881	16.11%
Democratic	Jerry Belsky	14,365	2.29%
Total votes		626,340	100.00%

== General election ==
=== Candidates ===
- Wyche Fowler, U.S. representative from Atlanta (Democratic)
- Mack Mattingly, incumbent U.S. senator since 1981 (Republican)

=== Results ===
1986 United States Senate election in Georgia
Party	Candidate	Votes	%	±%
Democratic	Wyche Fowler	623,707	50.92%	+1.79%
Republican	Mack Mattingly (incumbent)	601,241	49.08%	−1.79%
Write-in		60	0.00%	N/A
Total votes		1,225,008	100.00%	N/A
Democratic gain from Republican				

== See also ==
- 1986 United States Senate elections
