= Mack Mattingly =

American politician (born 1931)

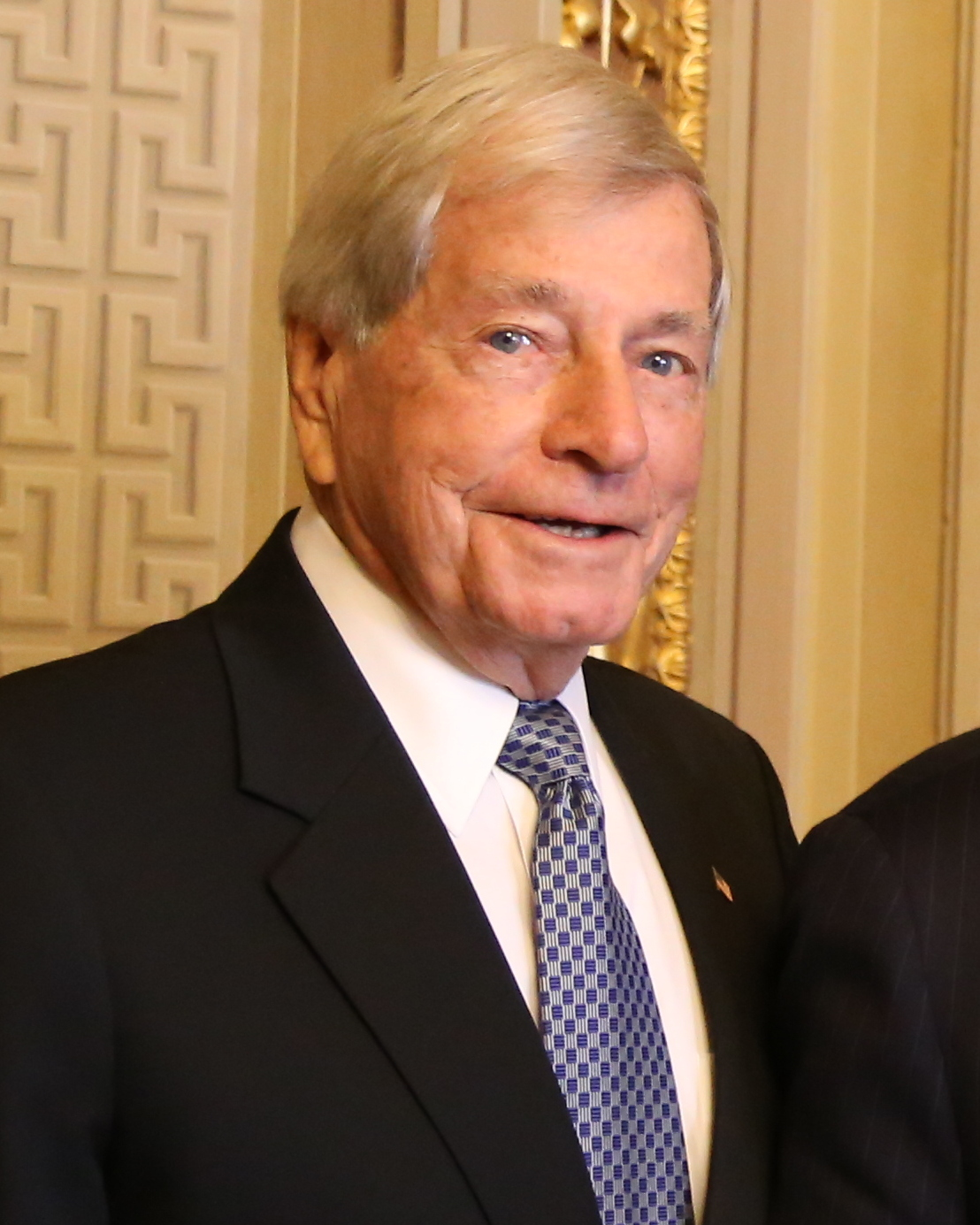
- Mattingly in 2017

United States Ambassador to Seychelles
- In office September 22, 1992 – March 1, 1993
- President: George H. W. Bush; Bill Clinton
- Preceded by: Dick Carlson
- Succeeded by: Carl Stokes

United States Senator from Georgia
- In office January 3, 1981 – January 3, 1987
- Preceded by: Herman Talmadge
- Succeeded by: Wyche Fowler

Chair of the Georgia Republican Party
- In office 1975–1977
- Preceded by: Bob Shaw
- Succeeded by: Rodney Cook

Personal details
- Born: Mack Francis Mattingly; January 7, 1931 (age 95) Anderson, Indiana, U.S.
- Party: Republican
- Spouses: Carolyn Longcamp (m. 1957; died 1997); Leslie Davisson (m. 1998)
- Children: 2
- Education: Indiana University, Bloomington (BS)

Military service
- Branch: United States Air Force
- Service years: 1951–1955
- Rank: Staff Sergeant

Mack Francis Mattingly (born January 7, 1931) is an American diplomat and politician from Georgia who served as a member of the United States Senate for one term from 1981 to 1987. He was the first Republican to have served in the U.S. Senate from that state since the Reconstruction era, and was also the first Republican ever to have been elected to the United States Senate from Georgia by popular vote.

== Early life ==
Mattingly was born in Anderson, Indiana, on January 7, 1931. He served four years in the United States Air Force from 1951 to 1955 and was stationed at Hunter Army Airfield in Savannah, Georgia. He became a staff sergeant. In 1957, he earned a Bachelor of Science degree in marketing from Indiana University Bloomington. Afterward, he worked for twenty years for IBM in Georgia and later operated his own business, M's Inc., which sold office supplies and equipment in Brunswick, Georgia.

== Early political career ==
Mattingly first became active in politics in 1964 when he served as chairman of U.S. Senator Barry Goldwater's campaign for president in Georgia's 8th congressional district. Goldwater carried Georgia. Two years later, Mattingly would help Bo Callaway organize the Georgia Republican Party and joined his ticket as a candidate for the U.S. House of Representatives against Congressman W. S. Stuckey Jr. Mattingly lost the race but was elected a member of the Georgia Republican Party State Executive Committee and served as Vice Chairman from 1968 until 1975. He served as Chairman of the Georgia Republican Party from 1975 to 1977 when he began exploring a race for the U.S. Senate.

== U.S. Senate tenure ==
In 1980, Mattingly scored a historic upset, defeating longtime Democratic Senator Herman Talmadge, outpolling Ronald Reagan who lost the state in the presidential election to native son Jimmy Carter. Mattingly served in the Senate from January 1981 until January 1987, with membership on the United States Senate Committee on Appropriations, chairing first the United States Senate Appropriations Subcommittee on the Legislative Branch and later the United States Senate Appropriations Subcommittee on Military Construction, Veterans Affairs, and Related Agencies. Mattingly also served at various times on the United States Senate Committee on Banking, Housing, and Urban Affairs, the United States Senate Committee on Homeland Security and Governmental Affairs, the United States Congressional Joint Economic Committee and the United States Senate Select Committee Ethics. He is perhaps best remembered as a proponent of the line-item veto, a position that earned him recognition by President Ronald Reagan during his 1985 State of the Union address.

Mattingly also garnered attention in 1981 when he submitted a budget proposal that would remove several sections of Playboy Magazine if the magazine wished to continue receiving federal funding for its Braille edition. While the motion would fail, a 1986 amendment from Representative Chalmers Wylie would successfully defund Playboy's Braille edition. This would be later reversed by a 1986 ruling in federal district court from Judge Thomas Hogan, who ruled that Congress' actions were a violation of the First Amendment. Production of the Playboy Braille edition resumed in January 1987.

=== 1986 campaign ===
In 1986, Mattingly was narrowly defeated in his bid for re-election by Congressman Wyche Fowler of Atlanta.

== Post senatorial career ==
In 1987, Reagan appointed Mattingly assistant secretary-general for defense support for NATO in Brussels, Belgium. In 1988, Mattingly received the Secretary of Defense Medal for Outstanding Public Service. In 1992, President George H. W. Bush appointed Mattingly ambassador to Seychelles. He served in this position until 1993.

Mattingly remains active on several corporate and nonprofit boards. Mattingly ran against Democrat Zell Miller in the 2000 special election to replace the deceased Senator Paul Coverdell, but Miller succeeded in holding the seat to which he had been appointed by Governor Roy Barnes.

Mattingly endorsed Fred Thompson for president in the 2008 Republican primary, and John McCain in the general. He would support Newt Gingrich for president in the 2012 Republican primary, and Mitt Romney in the general. He initially supported Jeb Bush but later Donald Trump for president in the 2016 Republican primary after Bush dropped out, and he supported Trump again in 2020. However, he did not vote for Trump in 2024.

== Personal life ==
Mattingly married Carolyn Longcamp in 1957, and they had two daughters, Jane and Anne. Carolyn Mattingly died in 1997. In 1998, he married Leslie Davisson, a lawyer, mediator and former judge. He currently lives on St. Simons Island, Georgia. He continues to be active in Republican politics, and he serves on a number of corporate boards.

Party political offices
Preceded by Bob Shaw	Chair of the Georgia Republican Party; 1975–1977	Succeeded by Rodney Cook
Preceded by Jerry Johnson	Republican nominee for U.S. Senator from Georgia (Class 3); 1980, 1986	Succeeded by Paul Coverdell
Preceded by Paul Coverdell	Republican nominee for U.S. Senator from Georgia (Class 3); 2000	Succeeded by Johnny Isakson
U.S. Senate
Preceded by Herman Talmadge	U.S. Senator (Class 3) from Georgia; 1981–1987; Served alongside: Sam Nunn	Succeeded by Wyche Fowler Jr.
Diplomatic posts
Preceded by Richard W. Carlson	United States Ambassador to Seychelles; 1992–1993	Succeeded by Stephen Malott
U.S. order of precedence (ceremonial)
Preceded by Robert Torricelli as Former U.S. Senator	Order of precedence of the United States	Succeeded by Wyche Fowler as Former U.S. Senator
