= Paul Coverdell =

American politician (1939–2000)

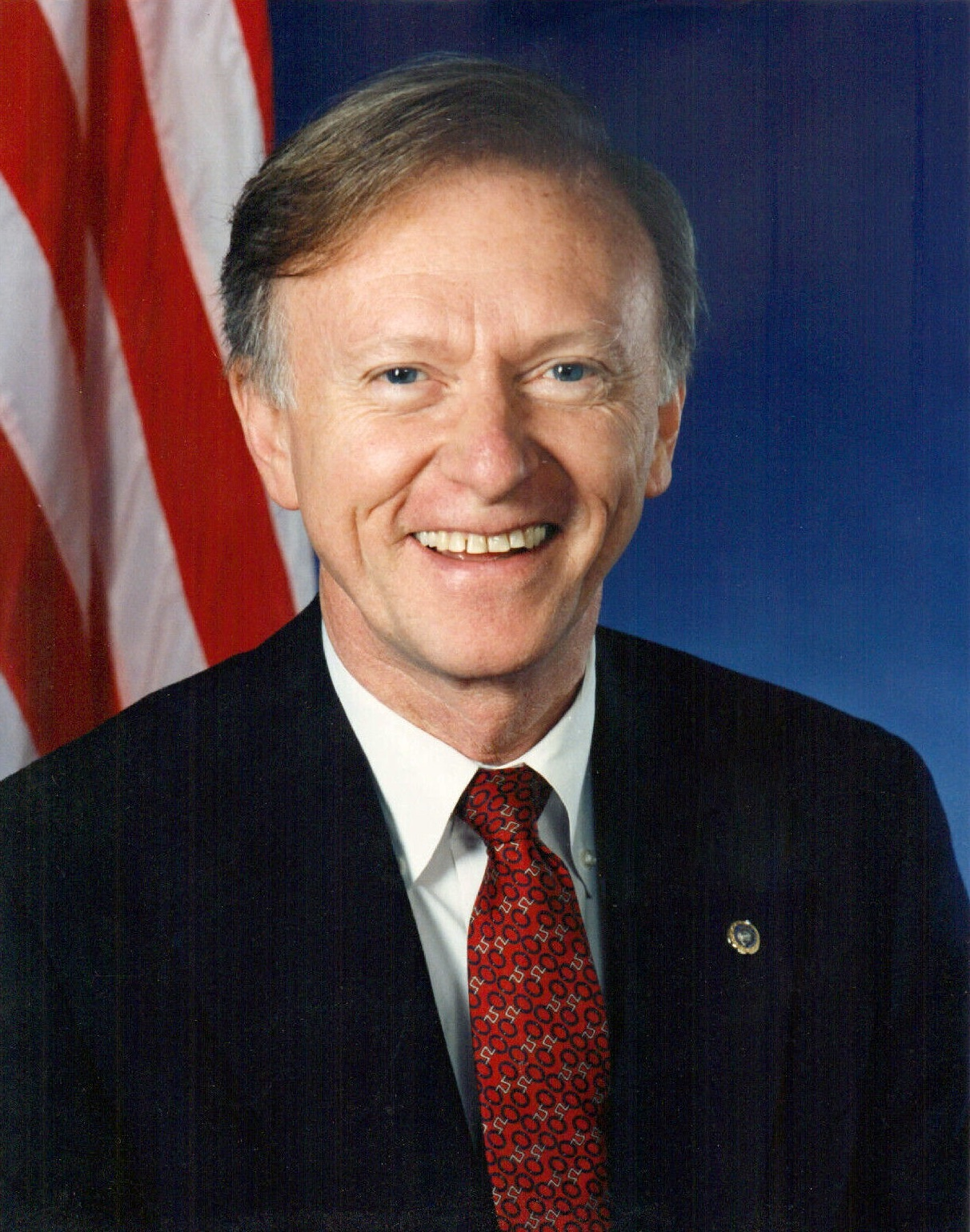
- Official portrait, 1998

United States Senator from Georgia
- In office January 3, 1993 – July 18, 2000
- Preceded by: Wyche Fowler
- Succeeded by: Zell Miller

11th Director of the Peace Corps
- In office May 2, 1989 – September 4, 1991
- President: George H. W. Bush
- Preceded by: Loret Miller Ruppe
- Succeeded by: Elaine Chao

Member of the Georgia Senate
- In office January 11, 1971 – May 2, 1989
- Preceded by: Jack Hardy
- Succeeded by: Michael J. Egan
- Constituency: 56th (1971–1973); 40th (1973–1989)

Personal details
- Born: Paul Douglas Coverdell; January 20, 1939 Des Moines, Iowa, U.S.
- Died: July 18, 2000 (aged 61) Atlanta, Georgia, U.S.
- Party: Republican
- Spouse: Nancy Nally Coverdell (m. 1967)
- Education: University of Missouri

Military service
- Branch/service: United States Army
- Years of service: 1962–1964
- Rank: Captain

Paul Douglas Coverdell (January 20, 1939 – July 18, 2000) was an American politician who served as a United States senator from Georgia from 1993 until his death in 2000. A member of the Republican Party, he previously served as the director of the Peace Corps from 1989 to 1991 under President George H. W. Bush.

== Early life ==
Coverdell was born in Des Moines, Iowa in 1939 and lived much of his childhood in the Midwest. Coverdell graduated from Lee's Summit High School in Lees Summit, Missouri. and went on to graduate from the University of Missouri in 1961 with a degree in journalism. While in college, Coverdell was a member of Phi Kappa Psi fraternity.

Coverdell joined the Army in 1962 and served as a captain in Okinawa, Taiwan, and Korea. After completing his service Coverdell settled in Atlanta with his wife, Nancy. Coverdell began a career in insurance, founding the firm Coverdell & Co. Inc. with his father and becoming president of the family business in 1965.

== Georgia State Senator (1970–1989) ==
Coverdell was unsuccessful in his first attempt to win election to the state senate in 1968 but he ran again and won in 1970 representing north Fulton County. Coverdell began serving as Senate Minority Leader in 1974, a position he held until he left the Georgia Senate in 1989. Coverdell worked with Democrats to accomplish his goals. Roy Barnes, a Democrat who would later be elected Governor of Georgia, said that when he joined the Georgia State Senate, Republican Coverdell took him under his political wing. "He showed that people of different parties could discuss their personal strengths and weaknesses," Barnes said. "I never worried that Paul would disclose anything I said." During Coverdell's time as minority leader he worked for pension reform, supported DUI legislation, and raising the legal drinking age in Georgia.

In 1977 Coverdell lost a special election to Wyche Fowler to succeed Andrew Young. After Coverdell's loss in 1977, he began working to develop a base for national Republican candidates and a viable statewide Republican Party organization. In 1985 Coverdell was elected Chairman of the Georgia GOP.

In 1978, Coverdell was vacationing in Maine and decided to look up former chairman of the Republican National Committee George H. W. Bush. Coverdell found Bush's address in a phone book, went to his home, knocked on the door and introduced himself to the future president. Bush and Coverdell became close friends and over the next fourteen years Bush and Coverdell would help each other on a number of occasions. In 1980, Coverdell was finance chairman in Georgia when Bush first ran for the Republican nomination for president. In 1988, Coverdell was the Southern steering committee chairman for the Bush campaign. Coverdell's efforts paid off in 1988 when Bush carried Georgia's twelve electoral votes. When Bush was elected president, Coverdell sent a letter. "If I can help, I'd like to help," Coverdell wrote. Bush appointed Coverdell to head the Peace Corps.

== Peace Corps Director (1989–1991) ==
Coverdell was sworn in as Director of the Peace Corps on May 2, 1989, in a ceremony in the Oval Office. At the same time Coverdell stepped down from the Georgia State Senate, a post he had held for 15 years and resigned as president of Coverdell and Co. Inc to devote his time to the Peace Corps. Coverdell's primary initiative as Peace Corps Director was the creation of the "World Wise Schools" program. The program linked students in the United States with Peace Corps volunteers serving around the world. During the time Coverdell was in office, the World Wise Schools program connected volunteers with 5,000 classrooms in the United States. Coverdell was well regarded among the Peace Corps community. In the fall of 2000, after his death, a tribute was held in his honor at the Peace Corps Headquarters to honor his life and legacy.

=== Peace Corps enters Eastern Europe ===
Coverdell sent the first Peace Corps volunteers to Eastern Europe after the fall of the Berlin Wall. On June 15, 1990, President George H. W. Bush hosted a send off for volunteers headed for Poland and Hungary. "The key you carry with you will be the English language—what Paul calls the language of commerce and understanding. And just as national literacy has long been the key to power, so today English literacy has become the key to progress. Like your liberty, your language came to you as a birthright and a credit to the dreams and sacrifices of those who came before. And today you're investing that birthright in the ancient dreams and the new ideas of faraway peoples and their own nations reborn. Your investment is America's investment in the consolidation of democracy and independence in Central and Eastern Europe. Peace Corps programs in Poland and Hungary, and then soon in Czechoslovakia, are another tangible element of America's sustained commitment to Central and Eastern Europe's democratic transformation toward a Europe whole and free."

=== Coverdell's support for the Peace Corps ===
After Coverdell was elected to the Senate he continued his support for the Peace Corps and supported legislation to expand it. In testimony before the International Relations Committee in the House of Representatives on March 18, 1998, Coverdell testified in support of expansion. "I want to point out that the goal of increasing the number of Peace Corps volunteers spans three Presidencies. Under the distinguished leadership of former Director, the late Director Ruppe, the concept of moving toward 10,000 American volunteers throughout the world began to be articulated by the Reagan Administration. During my directorship we continued the pursuit of expanding the volunteer corps. We were there at a rather unique moment in world history, and the emphasis necessarily began to shift to responding to a host of nations experiencing freedom for the first time in nearly half a century, many more years, and so the emphasis began to move toward the opening, as the chairman alluded to, of new country programs. These new countries can be the beneficiary of our activities if we pursue expanding the volunteer corps."

=== Controversy over trips to Georgia ===
Meanwhile, Coverdell had his eye on the Senate seat held by Wyche Fowler, the man who defeated him in the special election for Congress in 1977. The Associated Press reported on September 4, 1991, that Coverdell had resigned as director of the Peace Corps and was considering a run for the Senate. There is some controversy over Coverdell's use of the office of Peace Corps Director and his subsequent run for the Senate. The New York Times reported on September 27, 1992, that Coverdell's tenure as head of the Peace Corps was likely to be one of the issues in the 1992 Senate race in Georgia and that Coverdell had been "accused of using the office to plot his political future in Georgia." However, Charlton Heston, who came to Georgia to campaign on Coverdell's behalf in the Senate election, wrote for the National Review in 1992: "He served (as Peace Corps director) effectively, but it hardly seemed an ideal launching pad for national elective office." In 2001, the Georgia trips issue returned to the news when some senators proposed renaming the Peace Corps building after Coverdell.

== 1992 U.S. Senate election ==
In 1992, Coverdell faced an uphill fight to win a U.S. Senate seat and had to campaign in four separate elections (all-candidate primary, primary runoff, all-party general, and general runoff). Coverdell was not a natural campaigner. Senator Phil Gramm, then chairman of the National Republican Senatorial Committee, said he was appalled the first time he saw Coverdell speak. "Paul got up and spoke in that squeaky voice and he sort of had a way of jumping up and down when he was speaking and waving his hands," Gramm said. "But little did I know ... that this man had the heart of a lion."

Facing four other candidates in the Republican primary, Coverdell failed to win 50% of the vote and was forced into a runoff against Bob Barr that he won by only 1,600 votes. The general election also proved difficult. Democratic incumbent Wyche Fowler beat Coverdell by 30,000 votes on election day, but because the Libertarian candidate, Jim Hudson, had won 3 percent of the vote another runoff election was required. On November 24, Coverdell won the runoff by slightly over 16,000 votes, aided by an endorsement from Hudson, who was no longer in the race; he became only the second Republican Georgia sent to the Senate since Reconstruction. President Bush showed his support for Coverdell and Barbara Bush campaigned for Coverdell during the Senate race.

Coverdell was also aided by a memorable ad campaign, highlighted by the "Jingle" television and radio spots featuring a ditty written and sung by senior citizen Margie Lopp.

== United States Senator (1993–2000) ==
=== Service in the Senate ===
Coverdell served on the Senate Foreign Relations Committee, Agriculture Committee, and Small Business Committee. After the death of Senator John Chafee on October 24, 1999, a seat opened up on the Senate Finance Committee and Coverdell relinquished his seat on the Foreign Relations Committee to fill the seat. Coverdell sponsored legislation used by millions of Americans to fund college educations for their children originally called Education IRAs but now known as Coverdell Education Savings Accounts (CESAs) or Coverdell Plans for short. Coverdell ESAs allow money to grow tax deferred and proceeds to be withdrawn tax free for qualified education expenses at a qualified institution.

Coverdell sponsored the Volunteer Protection Act, a complex law that, in general, protects volunteers who serve nonprofit organizations and governmental entities from legal liability for tort claims based on simple negligence, provided that certain conditions are met. However critics of the law say that providing immunity to a volunteer who has injured someone as a consequence of his carelessness clashes with the charitable goal of helping others, that nonprofits should be held to the same standard of care as for-profit organizations, and that the Act would not be necessary at all if nonprofits carried adequate general liability insurance. Coverdell also worked against tax increases, to protect federal lands in national parks, and for humanitarian concerns.

In 1998, Coverdell, running with the slogan "Coverdell Works," made history by becoming the first Republican from Georgia ever to be re-elected to the U.S. Senate. In 1999 before an exploratory committee was formed, Coverdell took on the job of liaison between then Governor George W. Bush's campaign and the Senate. Early in the campaign, Coverdell's job was to line up Republican senators to endorse Governor Bush instead of Senator John McCain and he succeeded in getting the endorsement of almost every Senate Republican. After Bush locked up the nomination, Coverdell dealt with requests from senators who wanted to talk to Bush. "We don't want black holes," Coverdell said. "We want people feeling they are part of the effort. We want to create good will."

=== Death ===
On a trip to Georgia for a weekend of speaking engagements and constituency services, Coverdell complained of a severe headache. Diagnosed with a cerebral hemorrhage, Coverdell underwent surgery at Piedmont Hospital in Atlanta on July 17, 2000. He never regained consciousness and died early in the evening of July 18, 2000. He was 61 years old.

More than 50 senators and representatives from both parties joined 900 other mourners at Coverdell's funeral at the Peachtree United Methodist Church in Atlanta. Texas governor George W. Bush took time from the 2000 presidential campaign to attend the services with his wife Laura. President Clinton also released a statement expressing his condolences to the Coverdell family. Former president George H. W. Bush, a close friend of Coverdell, did not attend, but a family friend read his tribute. Bush wrote:

He loved politics and was a clear example of politics being a noble calling. He leaves behind a legacy that quiet is good, caring about the other guy matters.

== Legacy and honors ==
Coverdell was often described as a quiet, soft-spoken man, but he left profound marks on the governments of both the state of Georgia and the nation in a relatively brief period of time through the Coverdell Education Savings Accounts, which are used by millions of Americans to fund college educations for their children, and the establishment of a strong Republican Party in Georgia.

Coverdell left a legacy of civility in government. Political columnist David Broder wrote that Coverdell's "name rarely appeared in the headlines, and his face was not seen on magazine covers or the Sunday TV shows" but that he was admired and cherished by his colleagues. Democratic senator Dianne Feinstein remembered that "(Coverdell) was not only a good senator, he was a good and decent man ... a very nice man." Senator Olympia Snowe said "People like Paul Coverdell exist in the world — good, honorable, trustworthy people who call us to our better nature." George H. W. Bush honored Coverdell at the inauguration of the University of Georgia's Coverdell Center for Biomedical and Health Sciences on April 6, 2006: "In the Washington world of bitter partisanship, Paul was the voice of reason."

George W. Bush said:

Paul Coverdell was a man of unusual abilities and striking character. He spoke with candor when others might hide the unpleasant truth. He was wise and reasonable in a city that often lacks both virtues. He was a man of principle who understood our political system's essential need for compromise. He was respected by both allies and adversaries.

Coverdell's state Senate papers are held by Georgia State University, while his papers from the Peace Corps and United States Senate are housed at the Ina Dillard Russell Library of Georgia College & State University in Milledgeville, which also has a public policy institute named in his honor.

The Peace Corps' headquarters in Washington, D.C., was named for Coverdell. The World Wise School program that he started was rebranded with his name in his honor as well as the renaming of the Fellows/USA program, a graduate school benefit program for returned Peace Corps Volunteers, to bear his name. He was an esteemed Director of the agency and many programs were rebranded to bear his name in recognition of the work he provided to create them.

Coverdell was also honored by the Georgia General Assembly in 2005 with a resolution to rename the Legislative Office Building the "Paul Coverdell Legislative Office Building." The move came under some criticism as, ironically, Paul Coverdell had opposed the funding for the building while he was serving in the Georgia Senate.

Coverdell was survived by his wife Nancy, who later became a presidential elector in 2000 on the Bush-Cheney ticket.

== See also ==
- List of members of the United States Congress who died in office (2000–present)#2000s

Georgia State Senate
Preceded by Jack Hardy	Member of the Georgia State Senate from the 56th district January 11, 1971–January 8, 1973	Succeeded by Tom Moore
Preceded by E. Earl Patton Jr.	Member of the Georgia State Senate from the 40th district January 8, 1973–May 2, 1989	Succeeded by Michael J. Egan
Government offices
Preceded by Loret Miller Ruppe	Director of the Peace Corps; May 2, 1989–September 4, 1991	Succeeded by Elaine Chao
U.S. Senate
Preceded by Wyche Fowler, Jr.	U.S. senator (Class 3) from Georgia; January 3, 1993–July 18, 2000; Served alongside: Sam Nunn, Max Cleland	Succeeded by Zell Miller
Party political offices
Preceded by Mack Mattingly	Republican Party nominee for United States Senator from Georgia (Class 3); 1992, 1998	Succeeded by Mack Mattingly
Preceded by Connie Mack III	Vice Chair of the Senate Republican Conference; 1997–2001	Succeeded by Kay Bailey Hutchison
