= Georgia Republican Party =

U.S. State affiliate of the Republican Party

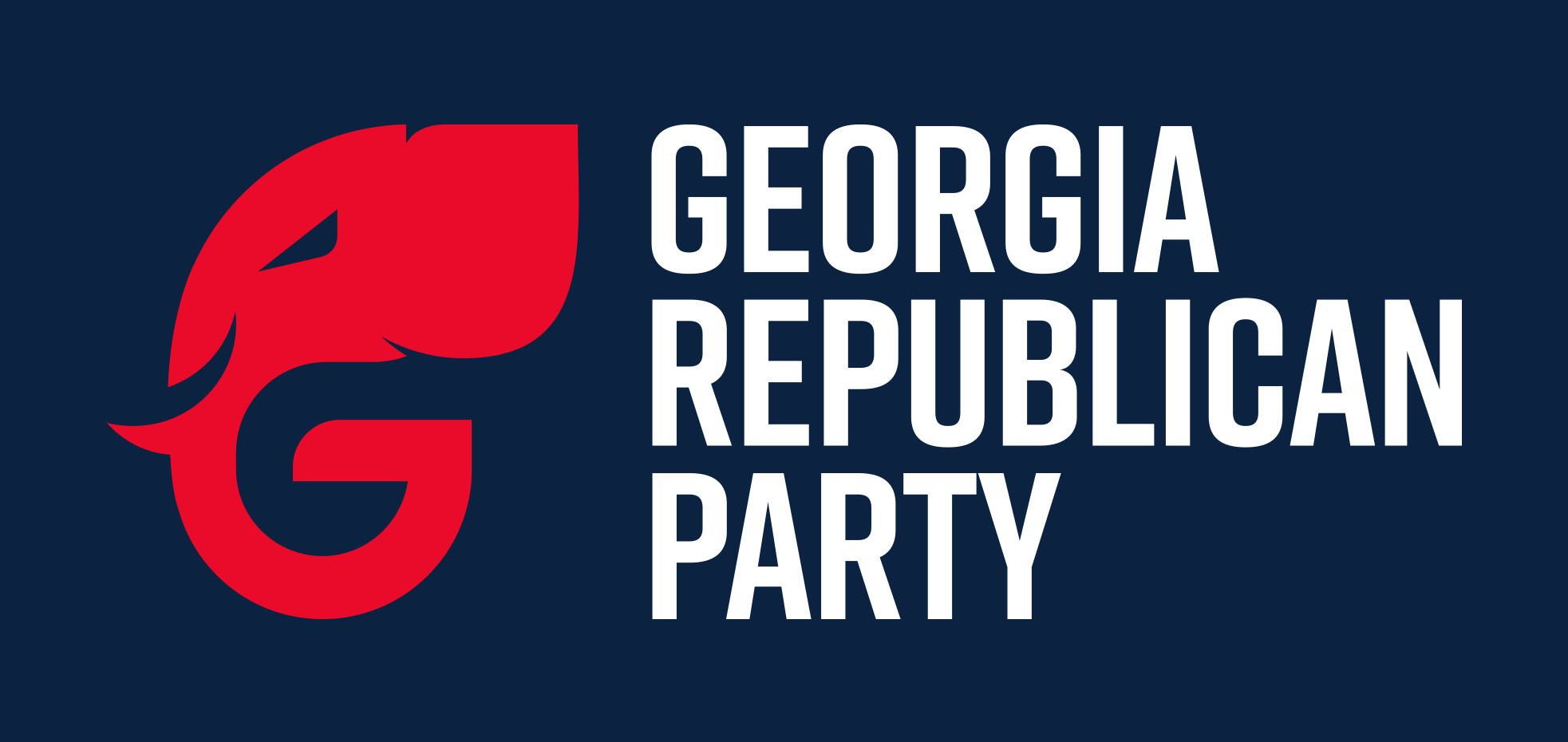
- Abbreviation: GAGOP
- Chairperson: Joshua McKoon
- Governor of Georgia: Brian Kemp
- Lieutenant Governor of Georgia: Burt Jones
- House Speaker: Jon G. Burns
- Founded: 1867
- Headquarters: 3110 Maple Drive; Atlanta, Georgia 30305
- Ideology: Conservatism in the United States
- National affiliation: Republican Party
- Colors: Red
- Statewide Executive Offices: 11 / 13
- Seats in the United States Senate: 0 / 2
- Seats in the United States House of Representatives: 9 / 14
- Georgia Senate: 33 / 56
- Georgia House of Representatives: 102 / 180

Election symbol

Website
- www.gagop.org

The Georgia Republican Party (GAGOP) is the affiliate of the Republican Party in the U.S. state of Georgia and one of the two major political parties in the state. It is chaired by Joshua McKoon.

From 2002 to 2026, it was Georgia's dominant party, having control of all nine of Georgia's statewide executive offices, nine of 14 of Georgia's seats in the United States House of Representatives, and had majorities in both houses of the General Assembly.

== Current structure ==
Joshua McKoon is the current state chairman. Travis Bowden is the executive director. Jason Thompson is serving as Republican National Committeeman representing Georgia. Thompson was reelected in June 2020 to a four-year term after being first elected in 2018 to fill the term of Randy Evans, who was appointed ambassador to Luxembourg by President Donald Trump. Ginger Howard was first elected at the 2016 State Convention as the current RNC Committeewoman and was reelected in June 2020 to a second term. Republicans hold every statewide, elected constitutional office in Georgia, as well as majorities in both the State House and the State Senate. Former senators Kelly Loeffler and David Perdue were defeated in the 2020-21 United States Senate election in Georgia and the 2020–21 United States Senate special election in Georgia respectively, and Republicans hold nine out of 14 of Georgia's seats in the U.S. House of Representatives.

The Republican National Committee (RNC) handles the national party day-to-day operations. Campaigns, events, and other party related activities are handled by the RNC. The chairman of the RNC is chosen by the president when the Republicans have the White House or otherwise by the party's state committees. There has never been a chairman from Georgia. The RNC, under the direction of the party's presidential candidate, supervises the Republican National Convention, raises funds, and coordinates campaign strategy. On the local level there are similar state committees in every state and most large cities, counties and legislative districts, but they have far less money and influence than the national body.

== History ==
=== Reconstruction and Jim Crow ===
Foster Blodgett, the chair of the party, opposed the removal of John Pope as governor of the Third Military District stating that "Reconstruction is now on a pivot" and that without action "the South would be forever lost to the Democrats".

Rufus Bullock received the Republican gubernatorial nomination from the delegates of the constitutional convention rather than a party convention. Bullock was elected governor. Support for the Republicans came from the 44% of the state's population that was African American, along with whites from the mountainous north. Bullock was the first Republican governor of Georgia, but he was threatened with impeachment and fled the state in 1871, leaving the governorship to Benjamin Conley, the president of the Georgia Senate. (In modern times, the lieutenant governor is the next in line if the governor cannot serve. However, the role of lieutenant governor had not yet been created by that time.) Conley, the second Republican governor of the state, only lasted 72 days: the legislature quickly called a special election, and Conley was succeeded by a Democrat, James Milton Smith, resulting in the end of Reconstruction in Georgia.

On September 3, 1868, the Georgia House of Representatives voted to expel all twenty-five black members and the Georgia State Senate expelled its three black members days later. Congress refused to seat Georgia's delegation in 1869, and ordered new state legislative elections for December 1870; the Republicans lost these elections.

After 1882, the Republican Party did not offer a full slate of candidates in Georgia (gubernatorial nor otherwise), cementing Democratic one-party rule in the state. By the turn of the 20th century, the party had developed a reputation among white Georgians as a "Negro party" led by corrupt whites and plagued by local infighting. Black Georgians who could register to vote tended to vote for Republicans, who remained a minority in the General Assembly throughout the Jim Crow era. After the resignation of W. H. Rogers of McIntosh County in 1907 and the full disenfranchisement of African-Americans was completed in 1908; however, only white legislators could be elected by black voters.

Republicans were absent from the State House in 1899–1902, 1909–1910, and 1931–1934, and from the State Senate in 1879–1880, 1883–1886, 1891–1894, 1905–1910, 1917–1920, 1923–1924, 1929–1930 and 1951–1952, with many of these periods resulting in no opposition of any kind to Democratic legislators. Most Republican representation in the General Assembly from the end of Reconstruction to the beginning of the Civil Rights era came from Fannin and surrounding Northeastern counties in the Appalachian region, largely owing to the history of anti-Confederate sentiment in the Appalachian region dating from the Civil War.

The Republican Party in Georgia, lacking electoral representation, was further weakened by internal rifts between party activists, with African-American party activists being criticized by White Republican activists for doling out political patronage for federal office jobs and for "dominating" the party leadership. Party leaders By the late 1920 and into the 1930s, White party activists under the leadership made an effort to clean up corruption, but also sought to suppress African-American party leadership. African-American members were removed from the state central committee as well as from the Georgia delegation to the Republican National Committee, and African-American party activists complained to the RNC leadership about the growing racism of party leadership. In 1936, a compromise was made in which African-Americans would be reserved one-third membership on the state committee, but would not be allowed to higher office nor control over patronage, a mandate which would hold over the next few decades.

A further split would occur along similar lines in 1944, when the Georgia delegation to the Republican National Convention split into two factions, one led by outgoing state chair Clint Hager and the other rallying around Committeeman Walter H. Johnson. The former group elected Roy G. Foster as their chair while the latter group elected W. Roscoe Tucker, but the latter faction had more success being recognized by the national convention as representing the Georgia party, and would emerge as the prevailing faction by 1952, when the Tucker faction (which was pro-Eisenhower) was seated by the national convention over Foster's pro-Taft stance, and Foster folded his faction into the Tucker faction.

=== Split and resurgence (1952–1990) ===
In addition, the 1952 election was the first time that Georgia figured so highly in both the primary and general presidential election for the Republican Party, with Georgia emerging as a key state to help Eisenhower win the nomination and then giving Eisenhower 30% of the popular vote. Much of these gains were due to the efforts of state chair Elbert Tuttle and activist Kiliaen Townsend, who organized a groundswell of support for Eisenhower within Atlanta's growing urban middle and upper class. Townsend had previously organized support for Thomas E. Dewey's campaign in 1948, and Dewey's loss to Harry Truman halted further activity by Townsend until 1950, Eisenhower then appointed state chair Elbert Tuttle as a judge on the Fifth Circuit Court of Appeals, which would then prove crucial for future Republican gains.

While the King v. Chapman ended the white Democratic primary system in Georgia in 1946, ending a practice which locked out anti-Democrat opposition for decades, the Supreme Court decision in Baker v. Carr (1962) was instrumental in opening up the electoral system for the Republican Party in Georgia. Tuttle, as a federal judge, would chair the panel which decided in which courts the multiple subsequent suits against the county unit system were tried, and then directed the legislature's reapportionment to give urban and suburban citizens, including African-American and many white immigrant Republican voters, a shot at fairer representation. Besides the election of the first African-American members to the General Assembly since 1910 as well as the election of Carl Sanders as the first urban Democrat to the governorship since 1917, Tuttle's destruction of the county unit system also led to an immediate increase in the number of Republican members in the General Assembly, the election of the first minority leaders in both houses, as well as the 1964 election of Bo Callaway as the first Republican member of Congress from Georgia since Reconstruction. Republican presence in the General Assembly would go from a single Republican, Charles William Kiker of Fannin County, in the Georgia Senate and three Republicans in the House by 1960 to seven Senate and 26 House Republicans in 1970.

In 1957, the Little Rock Crisis caused backlash among Republican voters, but the party organization remained intact. A motion to censure President Eisenhower for the deployment of troops at Little Rock was rebuffed by the state party.

In 1966, Callaway ran for and received the plurality of votes for governor but failed to win, when the election was decided by the Democratic Party-controlled Georgia legislature in favor of Democrat Lester Maddox. In the 1970s, amid the Watergate Scandal, the rise of Democratic president Jimmy Carter from Georgia, led to the self-proclaimed "dark days" for the Republican Party that led to a decade of failed elections and tough incidents. Georgia Republicans struggled through the 1960s, 1970s and 1980s to become a major party, occasionally winning victories such as the election of Newt Gingrich in 1979. Republican U.S. Senator Mack Mattingly was elected in 1980.

=== Rise to prominence ===
The party's fortunes finally began to turn in the 1990s. During the decade, Republicans gained a majority in the congressional delegation after a redistricting plan adopted by the General Assembly controlled by Democrats backfired. Also, Georgia played a pivotal role in national affairs, as Congressman Newt Gingrich propelled to the top, becoming Speaker of the U.S. House of Representatives.

In 2002, Sonny Perdue was elected as the first Republican governor of Georgia since Reconstruction. He served as governor from 2003 to 2011 for two terms. Republicans gained control of both chambers of the state legislature in 2002 and 2004.

=== Trumpism ===
In 2021, the Georgia Republican Party censured Georgia Secretary of State Brad Raffensperger. The censure resolution accused Raffensperger of failing to perform his duties in "accordance with the laws of the Constitution of the State of Georgia" following the 2020 election. Others argue the censure was caused by Raffensperger's rejection of then-President Donald Trump's false claim that he, and not Joe Biden, won the most votes in the state. At the same time, Governor Brian Kemp faced similar scrutiny for his rejection of Trump's false claims of fraud. Both Kemp and Raffensperger would soundly defeat Trump-backed primary challenges in the 2022 Republican primaries.

== Symbols and name ==
The mascot (symbol) of the Georgia Republican Party is the elephant. The elephant was originally constructed by artist Thomas Nast, in response to the criticism of a possible third term by President Ulysses S. Grant.

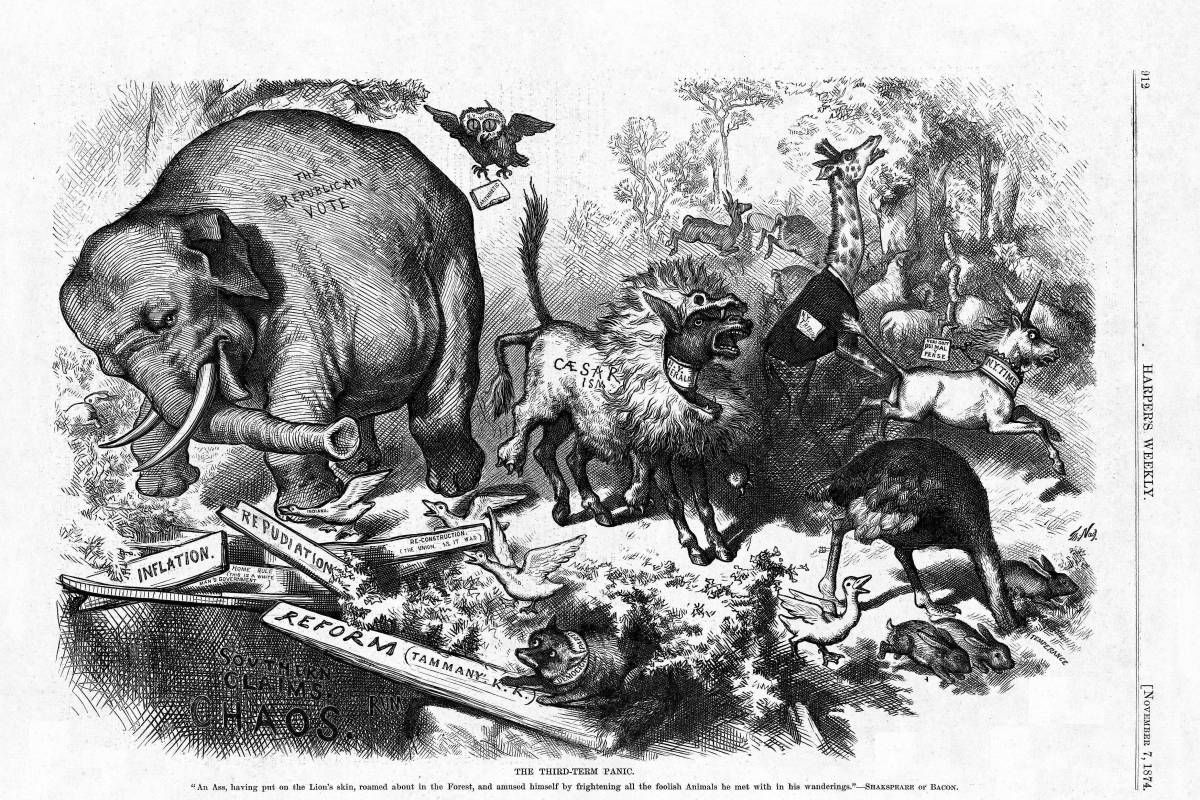
Depiction of party symbols

The cartoon's image was taken from one of Aesop's fables, "The Ass in the Lion's Skin." It follows up with, "At last coming upon a fox, he [the ass] tried to frighten him also, but the fox no sooner heard the sound of his voice than he exclaimed, 'I might possibly have been frightened myself, if I had not hear your bray.'" "The moral of the fable is that although a fool may disguise his appearance, his words will reveal his true nature. To Nast, the New York Herald is not a roaring lion to be feared, but a braying ass to be ridiculed. The reference in the citation to "Shakespeare or Bacon" is a jibe at Bennett's contention that Shakespeare's works were actually written by Sir Francis Bacon."

The symbol of the elephant shows up regularly on campaign merchandise and other party materials and rivals the Democrats' donkey.

== Current Republican officeholders ==
=== Members of Congress ===
==== U.S. Senate ====
- None

Both of Georgia's U.S. Senate seats have been held by Democrats since 2021. Kelly Loeffler was the last Republican to represent Georgia in the U.S. Senate. David Perdue was elected in 2014 and lost his bid for re-election in the 2020-21 regular runoff election to Jon Ossoff. Loeffler, who was appointed by Governor Brian Kemp upon the retirement of Johnny Isakson, lost her bid to finish Isakson's term in the 2020–21 special runoff election to Raphael Warnock. Loeffler left office on January 20, 2021. As a result of the runoff election, Perdue's term expired on January 3, 2021, which left the Class II seat vacant and left Loeffler as the state's sole Senator until Ossoff and Warnock's swearing in.

==== U.S. House of Representatives ====
Out of the 14 seats Georgia is apportioned in the U.S. House of Representatives, nine are held by Republicans:

District	Member	Photo
1st	Buddy Carter	
1st	Jim Kingston (elect)	
3rd	Brian Jack	
6th	Rich McCormick	
8th	Austin Scott	
9th	Andrew Clyde	
10th	Mike Collins	
10th	Houston Gaines (elect)	
11th	Barry Loudermilk	
11th	John Cowan (elect)	
12th	Rick Allen	
10th	Clay Fuller	

=== State officials ===
- Governor: Brian Kemp
- Lieutenant Governor: Burt Jones
- Secretary of State: Brad Raffensperger
- Attorney General: Christopher M. Carr
- State School Superintendent: Richard Woods
- State Agriculture Commissioner: Tyler Harper
- State Insurance Commissioner: Jim Beck
- State Labor Commissioner: Bárbara Rivera Holmes
- State Public Service Commissioner: Jason Shaw
- State Public Service Commissioner: Bubba McDonald
- State Public Service Commissioner: Tricia Pridemore

== Past chairs ==
- Foster Blodgett (1867–c. 1870)
- Alfred E. Buck (c. 1896)
- Walter H. Johnson (c. 1897)
- W. Y. Gilliam (c. 1925)
- Churchill P. Goree (1920–?)
- Roscoe Pickett (1928–?)
- Josiah T. Rose (c. 1931)
- Clint W. Hager (1937–1941)
- W. Roscoe Tucker (1945–1952)
- Elbert Tuttle (1952–1954)
- William B. Shartzer (1954–1961)
- James W. Dorsey (1961–1964)
- Joseph Tribble (1964–1965)
- G. Paul Jones Jr. (1965–1969)
- Wiley Wasden (1969–1971)
- Bob Shaw (1971–1975)
- Mack Mattingly (1975–1977)
- Rodney Mims Cook Sr. (1977–1981)
- Fred Cooper (1981–1985)
- Bob Bell (1983–1985)
- Paul Coverdell (1985–1987)
- John Stuckey (1987–1989)
- Rusty Paul (1995–1999)
- Chuck Clay (1999–2001)
- Ralph Reed (2001–2003)
- Alec Poitevint (2003–2007)
- Sue Everhart (2007–2013)
- John Padgett (2013–2017)
- John Watson (2017–2019)
- David Shafer (2019–2023)
- Joshua McKoon (2023–present)

== Past Republican governors ==
Rufus Bullock served from 1868 to 1871 before the Ku Klux Klan ran him out of office for appealing to the federal government to send military reinforcements to protect African-American legislators who had been expelled from the General Assembly as well as disenfranchised African American voters.

Benjamin Conley was sworn in and served for 72 days following Bullock's resignation until Confederate Colonel and Democrat James M. Smith was elected for the next term.

In 2002, Sonny Perdue was elected as the first Republican Governor of Georgia since Reconstruction. He earned a doctorate from University of Georgia in 1971 in veterinary medicine. He served in the U.S. Air Force, earning the rank of captain, before receiving his honorable discharge and starting up a small business in Raleigh, N.C. He served 10 years beginning in 1990 as a Democrat in the Georgia State Senate, including a tenure as majority leader from 1995 to 1996. He served as governor from 2003 to 2011 for two terms.

Nathan Deal served two terms as Georgia's governor from 2011 to 2019 after beating Roy Barnes in 2010 and Jason Carter in 2014. Deal resigned his position from the U.S. House of Representatives to run for governor. He won the 2010 Republican gubernatorial primary in a run-off against then-former secretary of state Karen Handel.

== Electoral history ==
=== Gubernatorial ===
Georgia Republican Party gubernatorial election results
Election	Gubernatorial candidate	Votes	Vote %	Result
1966	Bo Callaway	453,665	46.53%	Lost ✗
1970	Hal Suit	424,983	40.65%	Lost ✗
1974	Ronnie Thompson	289,113	30.87%	Lost ✗
1978	Rodney Mims Cook Sr.	128,139	19.33%	Lost ✗
1982	Robert H. Bell	434,496	37.18%	Lost ✗
1986	Guy Davis	346,512	29.49%	Lost ✗
1990	Johnny Isakson	645,625	44.54%	Lost ✗
1994	Guy Millner	756,371	48.9%	Lost ✗
1998	Guy Millner	790,201	44.1%	Lost ✗
2002	Sonny Perdue	1,041,677	51.42%	Won ✓
2006	Sonny Perdue	1,229,724	57.95%	Won ✓
2010	Nathan Deal	1,365,832	53.02%	Won ✓
2014	Nathan Deal	1,345,237	52.74%	Won ✓
2018	Brian Kemp	1,978,408	50.22%	Won ✓
2022	Brian Kemp	2,111,572	53.41%	Won ✓
2026	Rick Jackson	1,910,872	45.66%	Lost ✗

== Works cited ==
- Abbott, Richard (1986). The Republican Party and the South, 1855-1877: The First Southern Strategy. University of North Carolina Press. ISBN 0807816809.
