= 2022 United States Senate election in Georgia =

- November 8, 2022 (first round); December 6, 2022 (runoff)
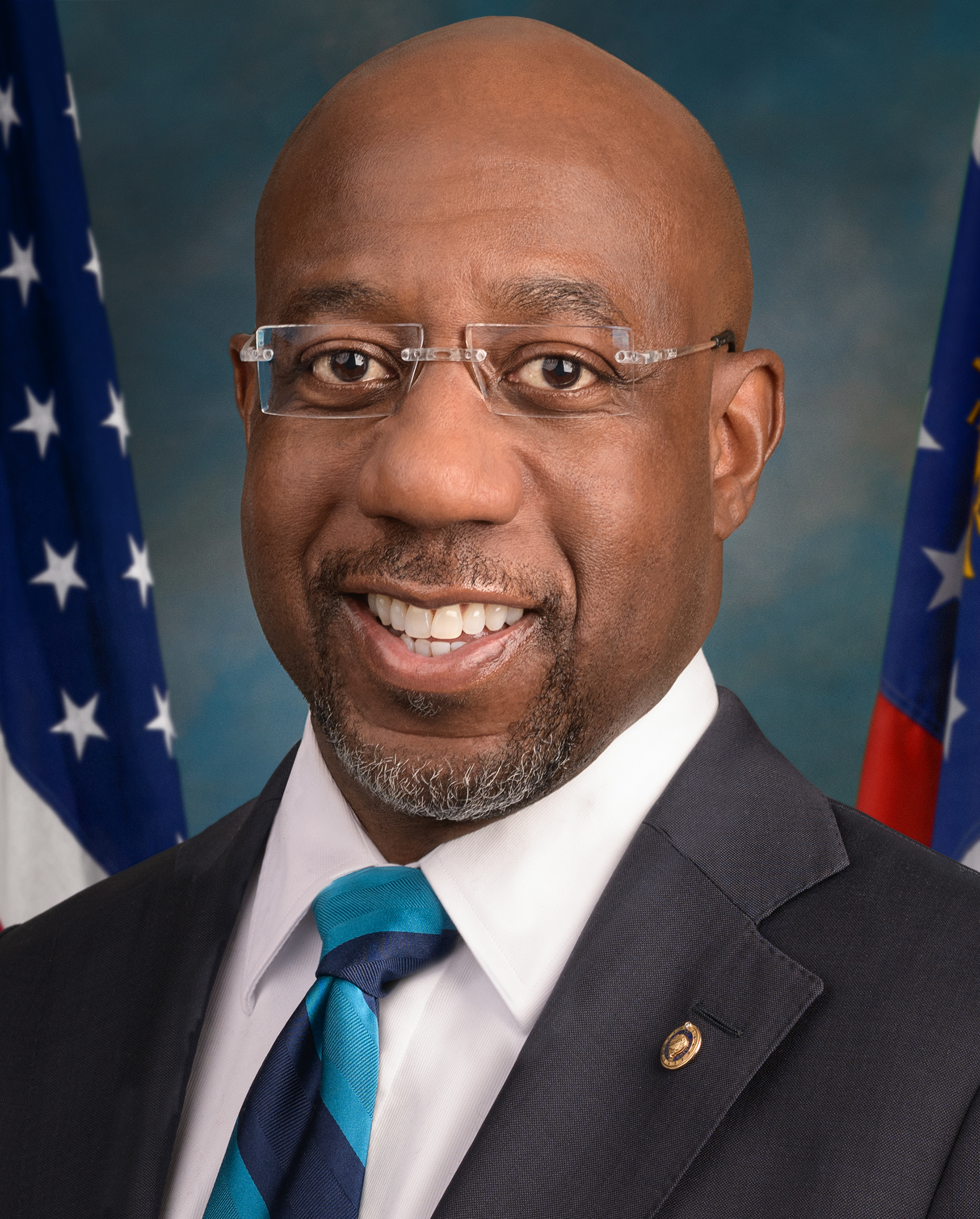

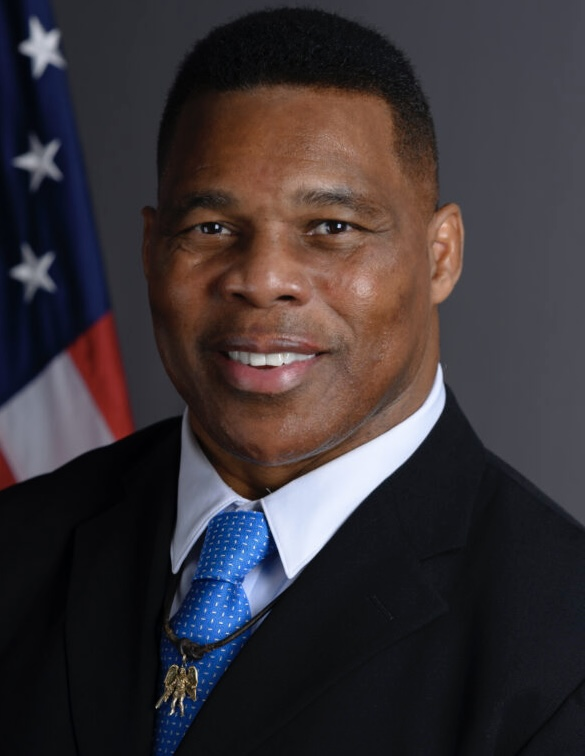
Candidate	Raphael Warnock	Herschel Walker
Party	Democratic	Republican
First round	1,946,117; 49.44%	1,908,442; 48.49%
Runoff	1,820,633; 51.40%	1,721,244; 48.60%
- Warnock: 40–50% 50–60% 60–70% 70–80% 80–90% >90% Walker: 40–50% 50–60% 60–70% 70–80% 80–90% >90%
U.S. senator before election
Raphael Warnock
Democratic
Elected U.S. Senator
Raphael Warnock
Democratic

The 2022 United States Senate election in Georgia was held on November 8, 2022, to elect a member of the U.S. Senate to represent the state of Georgia. Democratic incumbent Raphael Warnock won his first full term in office, defeating Republican former football player Herschel Walker. Under Georgia's two-round system, Warnock was re-elected in a runoff election on December 6 after neither candidate received over 50% of the vote on November 8. Warnock's win was the only statewide victory for Democrats in Georgia in 2022.

Warnock, who won a shortened term to the seat in a 2020–21 special election, was nominated in the May 24 primary with 96% of the vote against minimal opposition. Walker, who was endorsed by former president Donald Trump and Senate Minority Leader Mitch McConnell, won the Republican nomination with 68% of the vote over former state agriculture commissioner Gary Black. It was the first U.S. Senate election in Georgia history and among five nationwide since the passage of the Seventeenth Amendment in 1913 in which both major party nominees were Black. (Note: After Illinois in 2004 and South Carolina in 2014 and 2016, and concurrently with South Carolina in 2022.)

In the November 8 election, Warnock received 49.4% of the vote and Walker received 48.5%, triggering the December 6 runoff. Warnock defeated Walker by a 2.8% margin in the runoff, becoming the first African-American from Georgia elected to a full term in the U.S. Senate and the first Democrat to win a full term at this seat since Wyche Fowler in 1986. Warnock's victory also secured an outright majority for Senate Democrats for the first time since 2015, with a net gain of one seat in the 2022 midterms. This was the first time since 1998 that Georgia voted for different parties for U.S. senator and governor in the same election cycle. It was the third-closest Senate election of the 2022 midterms after Nevada and Wisconsin.

== Democratic primary ==
Warnock easily won renomination in the Democratic primary over Tamara Johnson-Shealey, a left-wing activist and businesswoman, who ran a low-profile campaign focused around reparations for slavery.

=== Candidates ===
==== Nominee ====
- Raphael Warnock, incumbent U.S. Senator

==== Eliminated in primary ====
- Tamara Johnson-Shealey, DeKalb County businesswoman and perennial candidate

=== Endorsements ===
Raphael Warnock

State officials

- Demetrius Douglas, former professional football player and state representative from the 78th district (2013–present)

Organizations

- End Citizens United
- Feminist Majority PAC
- Giffords
- Human Rights Campaign
- Humane Society of the United States Legislative Fund
- Jewish Dems
- League of Conservation Voters
- Let America Vote
- March On
- NARAL Pro-Choice America
- Natural Resources Defense Council
- Peace Action
- Planned Parenthood Action Fund
- Population Connection Action Fund
- Sierra Club

Labor unions

- Communications Workers of America

=== Polling ===
Poll source	Date(s) administered	Sample size (Note: Key: A – all adults RV – registered voters LV – likely voters V – unclear)	Margin of error	Raphael Warnock	Tamara Johnson-Shealey	Undecided
Emerson College	April 1–3, 2022	453 (LV)	± 4.6%	85%	6%	10%

=== Results ===
Results by county: Warnock: 80–90%; 90–100%

Results by precinct: Warnock: 60–70%; 70–80%; 80–90%; >90%; No votes

Democratic primary results
Party	Candidate	Votes	%
Democratic	Raphael Warnock (incumbent)	702,610	96.04%
Democratic	Tamara Johnson-Shealey	28,984	3.96%
Total votes		731,594	100.0%

== Republican primary ==
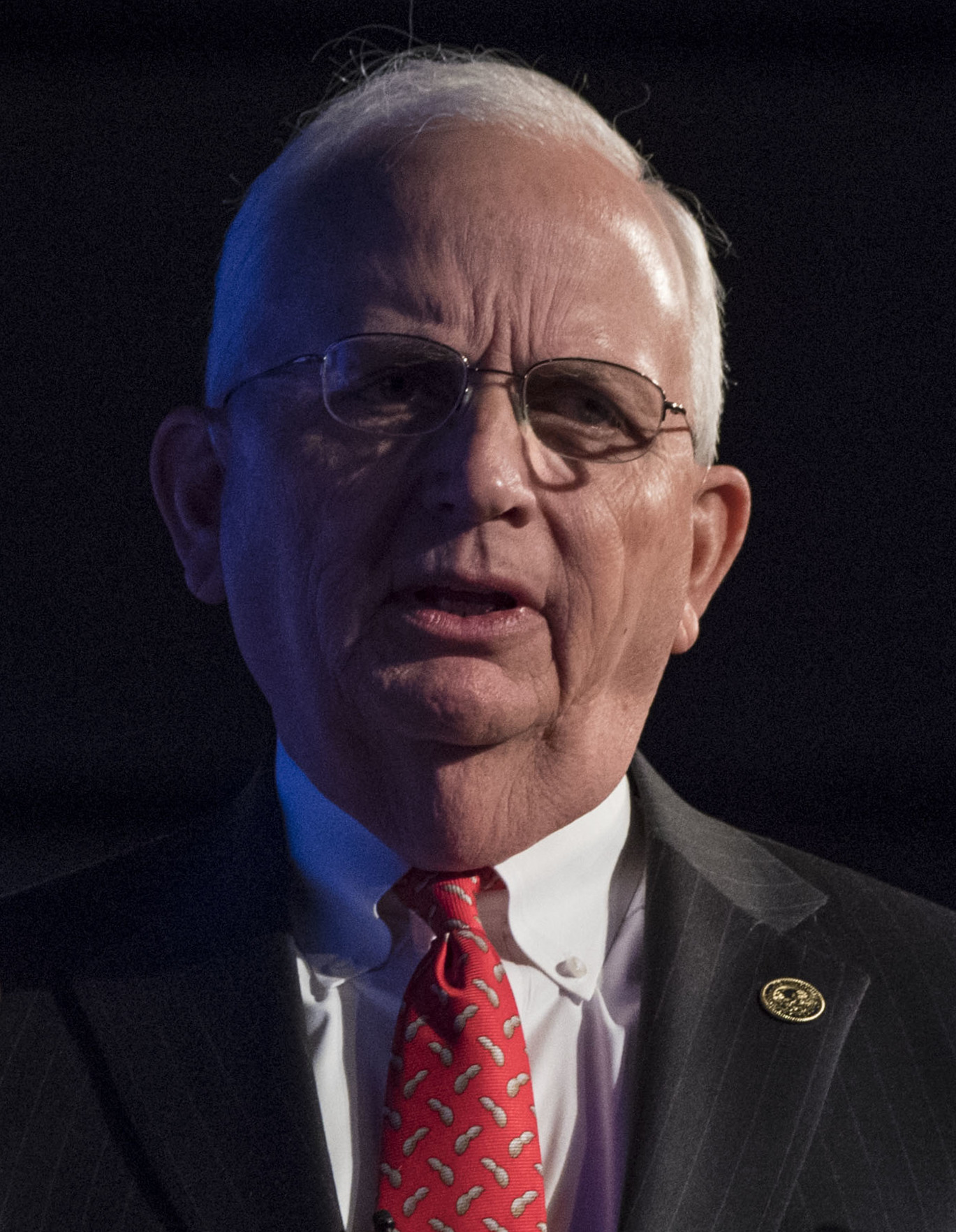
Georgia Agriculture Commissioner Gary Black was the runner-up in the Republican primary.

=== Candidates ===
==== Nominee ====
- Herschel Walker, former running back for the Georgia Bulldogs, former professional football player, and former co-chair of the President's Council on Sports, Fitness, and Nutrition and CEO of Renaissance Man Food Services

==== Eliminated in primary ====
- Gary Black, former Agriculture Commissioner of Georgia
- Josh Clark, former state representative and businessman
- Kelvin King, U.S. Air Force veteran, businessman, and founder of Osprey Management
- Jonathan McColumn, former U.S. Army Special Forces brigadier general and pastor
- Latham Saddler, former director of intelligence programs on the National Security Council and former Navy SEAL officer

==== Declined ====
- Christopher M. Carr, Attorney General of Georgia (ran for re-election)
- Buddy Carter, U.S. Representative for Georgia's 1st congressional district (ran for re-election; endorsed Walker)
- Doug Collins, former U.S. Representative for Georgia's 9th congressional district and candidate for the U.S. Senate in 2020
- Geoff Duncan, former Lieutenant Governor of Georgia and former state representative
- Randy Evans, former U.S. Ambassador to Luxembourg (endorsed Walker)
- Drew Ferguson, U.S. Representative for Georgia's 3rd congressional district (ran for re-election)
- Vernon Jones, former Democratic state representative and CEO of DeKalb County (ran for the U.S. House in GA-10)
- Brian Kemp, Governor of Georgia (ran for re-election)
- Jack Kingston, former U.S. Representative for Georgia's 1st congressional district
- Kelly Loeffler, former U.S. Senator (endorsed Walker)
- Harold Melton, former chief justice of Georgia Supreme Court
- David Perdue, former U.S. Senator (initially filed paperwork; ran for Governor)
- David Ralston, Speaker of the Georgia House of Representatives

=== Debates ===
2022 United States Senate Republican primary election in Georgia debates
No.	Date	Organizer	Location	Key: P Participant A Absent N Non-invitee I Invitee W Withdrawn						Source
No.	Date	Organizer	Location	Gary Black	Josh Clark	Kelvin King	Jonathan McColumn	Latham Saddler	Herschel Walker	Source
1	April 9, 2022	Georgia's 9th congressional district Republican Party	Gainesville	P	P	P	P	P	A	
2	May 3, 2022	Atlanta Press Club, Georgia Public Broadcasting	Atlanta	P	P	P	P	P	A	

=== Endorsements ===
Gary Black

Governors

- Nathan Deal, 82nd Governor of Georgia (2011–2019)

U.S. Representatives

- Andrew Clyde, U.S. Representative for Georgia's 9th congressional district (2021–present)
- Doug Collins, former U.S. Representative for Georgia's 9th congressional district (2013–2021), and candidate for U.S. Senate in 2020

State officials

- Bubba McDonald, Georgia Public Service Commissioner
Herschel Walker

Executive branch officials

- Nikki Haley, former U.S. Ambassador to the United Nations (2017–2019) and former governor of South Carolina (2011–2017)
- Donald Trump, 45th president of the United States (2017–2021)

U.S. Senators

- Marsha Blackburn, U.S. Senator from Tennessee (2019–present)
- Ted Cruz, U.S. Senator from Texas (2013–present)
- Steve Daines, U.S. Senator from Montana (2015–present)
- Lindsey Graham, U.S. Senator from South Carolina (2003–2026)
- Bill Hagerty, U.S. Senator from Tennessee (2021–present)
- Roger Marshall, U.S. Senator from Kansas (2021–present)
- Mitch McConnell, U.S Senator from Kentucky (1985–present), Senate Minority Leader (2021–2025, 2007–2015), and former Senate Majority Leader (2015–2021)
- Tim Scott, U.S. Senator from South Carolina (2013–present)
- John Thune, U.S. Senator from South Dakota (2005–present), Senate Minority Whip (2021–2025), Senate Majority Whip (2019–2021)
- Tommy Tuberville, U.S. Senator from Alabama (2021–present)

U.S. Representatives

- Buddy Carter, U.S. Representative for Georgia's 1st congressional district (2015–present)
- Marjorie Taylor Greene, U.S. Representative for Georgia's 14th congressional district (2021–2026)

Individuals

- Sean Hannity, American talk show host and conservative political commentator

Organizations

- American Conservative Union
- Black America's Political Action Committee
- National Right to Life

=== Polling ===
View source data.

Aggregate polls

Source of poll aggregation	Dates administered	Dates updated	Gary Black	Josh Clark	Kelvin King	Jonathan McColumn	Latham Saddler	Herschel Walker	Other (Note: Calculated by taking the difference of 100% and all other candidates combined.)	Margin
Real Clear Politics	May 12–23, 2022	May 24, 2022	9.0%	2.7%	4.0%	1.7%	9.0%	64.7%	12.9%	Walker +55.7

Poll source	Date(s) administered	Sample size	Margin of error	Gary Black	Josh Clark	Kelvin King	Jonathan McColumn	Latham Saddler	Herschel Walker	Other	Undecided
The Trafalgar Group (R)	May 21–23, 2022	1,074 (LV)	± 2.9%	10%	3%	4%	2%	10%	67%	–	4%
Landmark Communications (R)	May 22, 2022	500 (LV)	± 4.4%	9%	3%	5%	2%	12%	60%	–	9%
Fox News	May 12–16, 2022	1,004 (LV)	± 3.0%	8%	2%	3%	1%	5%	66%	1%	11%
ARW Strategies (R)	April 30 – May 1, 2022	600 (LV)	± 4.0%	10%	1%	3%	1%	4%	59%	–	23%
SurveyUSA	April 22–27, 2022	559 (LV)	± 4.8%	6%	3%	2%	2%	3%	62%	–	21%
University of Georgia	April 10–22, 2022	886 (LV)	± 3.3%	7%	1%	1%	1%	2%	66%	–	23%
Landmark Communications (R)	April 9–10, 2022	660 (LV)	± 3.8%	9%	3%	4%	0%	5%	64%	–	14%
Spry Strategies (R)	April 6–10, 2022	600 (LV)	± 4.0%	7%	2%	4%	–	2%	64%	–	21%
University of Georgia	March 20 – April 8, 2022	~329 (LV)	± 5.4%	8%	0%	2%	0%	2%	64%	–	24%
Emerson College	April 1–3, 2022	509 (LV)	± 4.3%	13%	4%	5%	3%	2%	57%	2% (Note: Nestor with 2%)	16%
Fox News	March 2–6, 2022	914 (LV)	± 3.0%	8%	1%	3%	–	2%	66%	1%	16%
InsiderAdvantage (R)	February 28 – March 1, 2022	750 (LV)	± 3.6%	6%	3%	4%	–	3%	63%	2%	20%
The Trafalgar Group (R)	February 11–13, 2022	1,072 (LV)	± 3.0%	6%	–	2%	–	3%	70%	–	19%
Quinnipiac University	January 19–24, 2022	666 (LV)	± 3.8%	6%	0%	2%	–	1%	81%	0% (Note: Craig and Nestor with 0%)	9%
OnMessage Inc. (R) (Note: This poll was sponsored by 34N22 Leadership, which supports Walker)	October 11–14, 2021	400 (LV)	± 4.9%	6%	–	1%	–	1%	74%	2% (Note: Craig and Nestor with 1%)	16%
The Trafalgar Group (R)	September 2–4, 2021	1,078 (LV)	± 3.0%	6%	–	2%	–	3%	76%	–	13%
Fabrizio Lee (R) (Note: This poll was sponsored by Save America PAC)	August 11–12, 2021	500 (LV)	± 4.4%	5%	–	2%	–	1%	54%	3% (Note: Carter with 3%)	35%

Hypothetical polling

Poll source	Date(s) administered	Sample size	Margin of error	Doug Collins	Marjorie Taylor Greene	Kelly Loeffler	Herschel Walker	Undecided
OnMessage Inc. (R)	March 14–15, 2021	600 (LV)	± 4.0%	35%	7%	22%	27%	11%
Trafalgar Group/InsiderAdvantage	March 7–9, 2021	– (LV) (Note: Likely Republican primary voter subsample of 1,093 likely general election voters)	–	33%	–	24%	33%	11%

Primary runoff polling
Doug Collins vs. Kelly Loeffler

Poll source	Date(s) administered	Sample size	Margin of error	Doug Collins	Kelly Loeffler	Undecided
OnMessage Inc. (R)	March 14–15, 2021	600 (LV)	± 4.0%	55%	36%	10%
Trafalgar Group/InsiderAdvantage	March 7–9, 2021	– (LV)	–	52%	32%	16%

Herschel Walker vs. Doug Collins

Poll source	Date(s) administered	Sample size	Margin of error	Herschel Walker	Doug Collins	Undecided
Trafalgar Group/InsiderAdvantage	March 7–9, 2021	– (LV)	–	50%	36%	14%

Herschel Walker vs. Kelly Loeffler

Poll source	Date(s) administered	Sample size	Margin of error	Herschel Walker	Kelly Loeffler	Undecided
Trafalgar Group/InsiderAdvantage	March 7–9, 2021	– (LV)	–	62%	26%	11%

=== Results ===
Results by county: Walker: 50–60%; 60–70%; 70–80%; 80–90%; 90–100%

Results by precinct: Walker: 20–30%; 30–40%; 40–50%; 50–60%; 60–70%; 70–80%; 80–90%; >90%; Black: 20–30%; 30–40%; 40–50%; 50–60%; 60–70%; >90%; Saddler: 40–50%; >90%; Clark: 60–70%; >90%; King: 40–50%; 50–60%; 60–70%; >90%; Tie: 20–30%; 30–40%; 40–50%; 50%; No votes

Republican primary results
Party	Candidate	Votes	%
Republican	Herschel Walker	803,560	68.18%
Republican	Gary Black	157,370	13.35%
Republican	Latham Saddler	104,471	8.86%
Republican	Josh Clark	46,693	3.96%
Republican	Kelvin King	37,930	3.22%
Republican	Jonathan McColumn	28,601	2.43%
Total votes		1,178,625	100.0%

== Libertarian primary ==
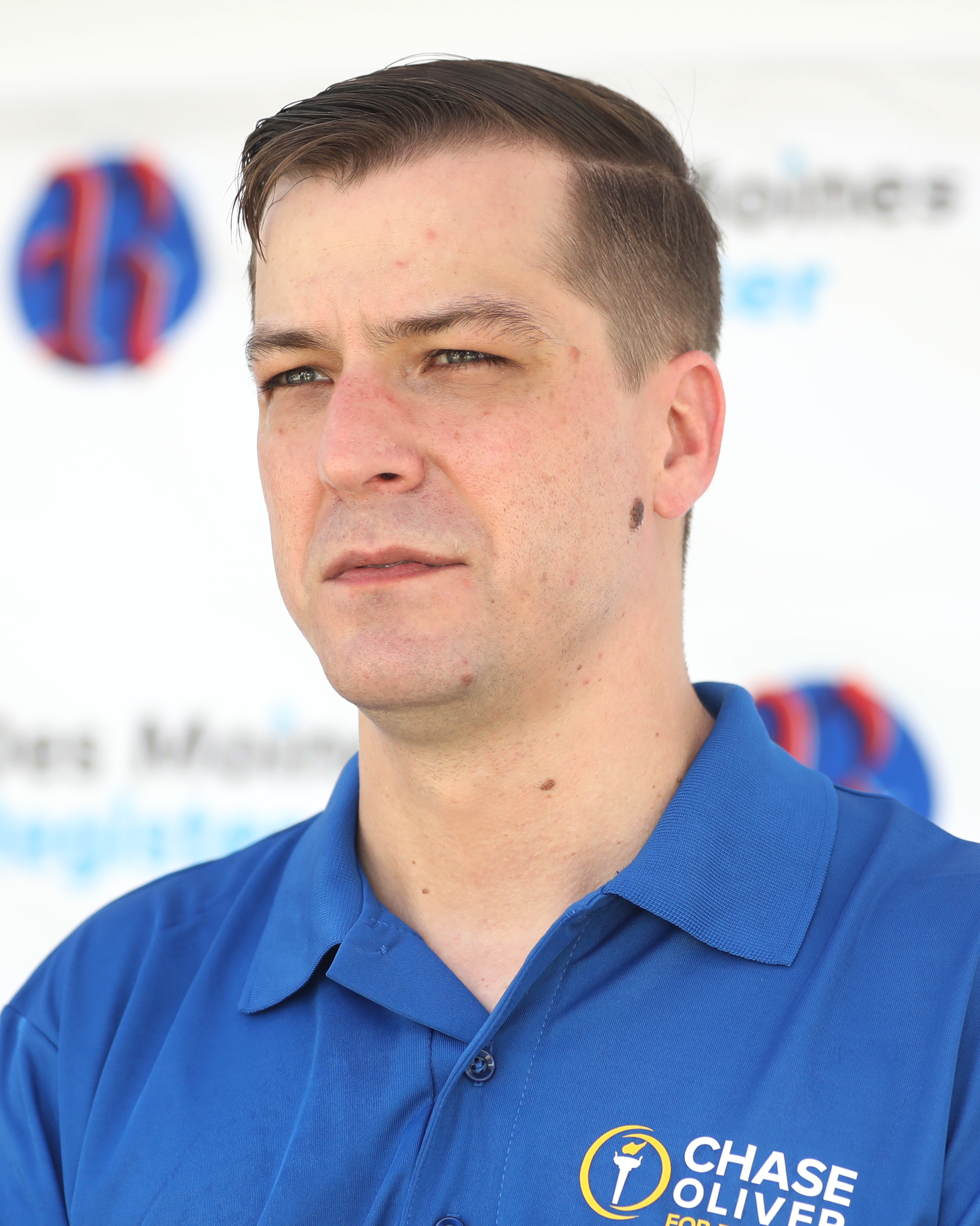
Libertarian nominee Chase Oliver

=== Candidates ===
==== Declared ====
- Chase Oliver, chair of the Atlanta Libertarian Party, customer service specialist, and candidate for Georgia's 5th congressional district in the 2020 House of Representatives special election. Oliver was the first openly gay Senate candidate in Georgia.

== General election ==
=== Predictions ===
Source	Ranking	As of
The Cook Political Report	Tossup	March 4, 2022
Inside Elections	Tossup	April 1, 2022
Sabato's Crystal Ball	Lean R (flip)	November 7, 2022
Politico	Tossup	April 1, 2022
RCP	Tossup	February 24, 2022
Fox News	Tossup	October 25, 2022
DDHQ	Tossup	October 25, 2022
FiveThirtyEight	Lean R (flip)	November 7, 2022
The Economist	Tossup	November 1, 2022

=== Debates ===
2022 United States Senate general election in Georgia debates
No.	Date	Host	Moderator	Link	Democratic	Republican	Libertarian
Key: P Participant A Absent N Not invited I Invited W Withdrawn							
Key: P Participant A Absent N Not invited I Invited W Withdrawn					Raphael Warnock	Herschel Walker	Chase Oliver
1	Oct. 14, 2022	Nexstar Media Group	Buck Lanford; Tina Tyus-Shaw		P	P	N
2	Oct. 16, 2022	Georgia Public Broadcasting	Scott Slade		P	A	P

=== Endorsements ===
Raphael Warnock (D)

Executive Branch officials

- Joe Biden, 46th president of the United States (2021–2025)
- Barack Obama, 44th President of the United States (2009–2017)

U.S. Senators

- Cory Booker, U.S. Senator from New Jersey (2013–present)
- John Fetterman, U.S. Senator from Pennsylvania (2023-Present) and Lieutenant Governor of Pennsylvania (2019–2023)
- Jon Ossoff, U.S. Senator from Georgia (2021–present)
- Elizabeth Warren, U.S. Senator from Massachusetts (2013–present)

U.S. Representatives

- Sanford Bishop, U.S. Representative for Georgia's 2nd congressional district (1993–present)
- Nancy Pelosi, Speaker of the United States House of Representatives (2019–2023; 2007–2011) and U.S. Representative from California (1987–present)
- Nikema Williams, U.S. Representative for Georgia's 5th congressional district (2021–present)

State officials

- Stacey Abrams, former Minority Leader of the Georgia House of Representatives, founder of Fair Fight Action, and nominee for Governor of Georgia in 2018 and 2022
- James Beverly, state representative from the 143rd district (2013–2025)
- William Boddie, state representative from the 62nd district (2017–2023)
- Demetrius Douglas, former professional football player and state representative from the 78th district (2013–present)
- Gloria Frazier, state representative from the 126th district (2013–2025)
- Harold V. Jones II, state senator for the 22nd district (2015–present)
- Jen Jordan, state senator for the 6th district (2017–2023)
- David Lucas, state senator for the 26th district (2013–present)
- Miriam Paris, state representative from the 142nd district (2017–present)

Local officials

- Kelly Girtz, Mayor of Athens (2019–present)

Individuals

- J. J. Abrams, filmmaker
- Arianna Afsar, singer
- Waka Flocka Flame, rapper
- Maxwell Frost, U.S. Representative-elect for Florida's 10th congressional district
- LeBron James, professional basketball player
- Daniel Dae Kim, actor
- Min Jin Lee, author
- Spike Lee, film director
- John Legend, singer and songwriter
- Jeannie Mai, television host
- Gucci Mane, entertainer
- Dave Matthews, singer
- Killer Mike, rapper
- Lin-Manuel Miranda, composer and filmmaker
- Michelle Obama, former First Lady of the United States (2009–2017)
- Martin Sheen, actor
- Steven Spielberg, film director
- Kerry Washington, actress
- Oprah Winfrey, businesswoman and talk show host
- Henry Winkler, actor
- Stevie Wonder, singer and songwriter

Organizations

- Actors' Equity Association
- Asian-American Advocacy Fund
- End Citizens United
- Everytown for Gun Safety
- Feminist Majority PAC
- Giffords
- Human Rights Campaign
- Humane Society of the United States Legislative Fund
- Jewish Dems
- League of Conservation Voters
- Let America Vote
- March On
- NARAL Pro-Choice America
- National Association of Social Workers
- National Organization for Women
- Natural Resources Defense Council
- Peace Action
- Planned Parenthood Action Fund
- Population Connection Action Fund
- Sierra Club

Labor unions

- Communications Workers of America
- National Education Association
- United Auto Workers
Herschel Walker (R)

Executive Branch officials

- Nikki Haley, former U.S. Ambassador to the United Nations (2017–2019) and former governor of South Carolina (2011–2017)
- Mike Pompeo, former U.S. Secretary of State (2018–2021) and former Director of the CIA (2017–2018)
- Donald Trump, 45th president of the United States (2017–2021)

State officials

- Pam Bondi, Attorney General of Florida (2011–2019)
- Ron DeSantis, Governor of Florida (2019–present)
- Brian Kemp, Governor of Georgia (2019–present)
- Jodi Lott, state representative from the 122nd district (2015–2025)
- Mark Newton, state representative from the 123rd district (2017–present)
- Jesse Petrea, state representative from the 166th district (2015–present)
- Randy Robertson, state senator from the 29th district (2019–present)
- Ron Stephens, state representative from Georgia (1997–present)

U.S. Senators

- Katie Britt, U.S Senator from Alabama (2023-Present)
- Saxby Chambliss, U.S. Senator from Georgia (2003–2015)
- John Cornyn, U.S. Senator from Texas (2002–present)
- Tom Cotton, U.S. Senator from Arkansas (2015–present)
- Ted Cruz, U.S. Senator from Texas (2013–present)
- Steve Daines, U.S. Senator from Montana (2015–present)
- Lindsey Graham, U.S. Senator from South Carolina (2003–present)
- Josh Hawley, U.S. Senator from Missouri (2019–present)
- John Kennedy, U.S. Senator from Louisiana (2017–present)
- Kelly Loeffler, U.S. Senator from Georgia (2020–2021)
- Roger Marshall, U.S. Senator from Kansas (2021–present)
- Mack Mattingly, U.S. Senator from Georgia (1981–1987)
- Mitch McConnell, U.S. Senator from Kentucky (1985–present), Senate Minority Leader (2021–present, 2007–2015), and former Senate Majority Leader (2015–2021)
- David Perdue, U.S. Senator from Georgia (2015–2021)
- Rick Scott, U.S. Senator from Florida (2019–present)
- Tim Scott, U.S. Senator from South Carolina (2013–present)
- John Thune, U.S. Senator from South Dakota (2005–present), Senate Minority Whip (2021–present), and former Senate Majority Whip (2019–2021)
- Tommy Tuberville, U.S. Senator from Alabama (2021–present)

U.S. Representatives

- Rick W. Allen, U.S. Representative for Georgia's 12th congressional district (2015–present)
- Don Bacon, U.S. Representative for Nebraska's 2nd congressional district (2017–present)
- Buddy Carter, U.S. Representative for Georgia's 1st congressional district (2015–present)
- Tulsi Gabbard, former U.S. Representative for Hawaii's 2nd congressional district (2013–2021) (Independent)
- Newt Gingrich, former Speaker of the United States House of Representatives (1995–1999) and former U.S. Representative for Georgia's 6th congressional district (1979–1999)
- Marjorie Taylor Greene, U.S. Representative for Georgia's 14th congressional district (2021–2025)

Individuals

- Bobby Christine, District Attorney of the Columbia County Judicial Circuit (2021–2025)
- Vince Dooley, former head coach of the Georgia Bulldogs (deceased)
- Ric Flair, professional wrestler
- Doug Flutie, NFL and CFL quarterback
- Tom Glavine, pitcher for the Atlanta Braves
- Sean Hannity, talk show host and conservative political commentator
- Ronna McDaniel, former chair of the Republican National Committee
- Chuck Norris, martial artist and actor
- Ralph Reed, political consultant
- Kanye West, rapper, businessman, and fashion designer

Organizations

- American Conservative Union
- Black America's Political Action Committee
- Campaign for Working Families
- National Right to Life
Declined to endorse

Statewide officials

- Gary Black, Agriculture Commissioner of Georgia (2011–2023) and candidate for U.S. Senate in 2022 (Republican)
- Geoff Duncan, Lieutenant Governor of Georgia (2019–2023) (Republican)

=== Polling ===
Aggregate polls

Source of poll aggregation	Dates administered	Dates updated	Raphael Warnock (D)	Herschel Walker (R)	Other	Margin
Real Clear Politics	October 29 – November 7, 2022	November 7, 2022	47.4%	48.8%	3.8%	Walker +1.4
FiveThirtyEight	October 13 – November 7, 2022	November 7, 2022	46.7%	47.7%	5.69%	Walker +1.0
270ToWin	November 4–7, 2022	November 7, 2022	47.3%	48.5%	5.1%	Walker +1.2
Average			47.1%	48.3%	4.6%	Walker +1.2

View source data.

Poll source	Date(s) administered	Sample size	Margin of error	Raphael Warnock (D)	Herschel Walker (R)	Chase Oliver (L)	Other	Undecided
AtlasIntel	November 5–7, 2022	791 (LV)	± 3.0%	46%	49%	–	5% (Note: "Other candidate/Don't know" with 5%)	–
Landmark Communications	November 4–7, 2022	1,214 (LV)	± 2.8%	46%	47%	5%	–	2%
InsiderAdvantage (R)	November 6, 2022	550 (LV)	± 4.2%	47%	49%	1%	–	4%
Research Co.	November 4–6, 2022	450 (LV)	± 4.6%	47%	47%	1%	–	5%
The Trafalgar Group (R)	November 4–6, 2022	1,103 (LV)	± 2.9%	47%	50%	2%	–	2%
Data for Progress (D)	November 2–6, 2022	1,474 (LV)	± 3.0%	48%	49%	3%	–	–
Targoz Market Research	November 2–6, 2022	579 (LV)	± 4.0%	47%	49%	1%	2% (Note: "All others" with 2%)	–
East Carolina University	November 2–5, 2022	1,077 (LV)	± 3.5%	49%	49%	2%	–	–
Amber Integrated (R)	November 1–2, 2022	600 (LV)	± 4.0%	45%	48%	3%	–	4%
Remington Research Group (R)	November 1–2, 2022	1,150 (LV)	± 2.8%	45%	49%	2%	–	4%
Echleon Insights	October 31 – November 2, 2022	500 (LV)	± 5.4%	45%	49%	3%	–	3%
Echleon Insights	October 31 – November 2, 2022	500 (LV)	± 5.4%	45%	52%	–	–	3%
Marist College	October 31 – November 2, 2022	1,168 (RV)	± 3.9%	49%	45%	–	1% (Note: "Another party's candidate" with 1%)	6%
Marist College	October 31 – November 2, 2022	1,009 (LV)	± 4.2%	48%	48%	–	1%	3%
Moore Information Group (R) (Note: This poll was sponsored by Walker's campaign)	October 29 – November 2, 2022	800 (LV)	± 3.0%	44%	49%	2%	–	5%
SurveyUSA	October 29 – November 2, 2022	1,171 (LV)	± 3.7%	49%	43%	3%	–	5%
Patinkin Research Strategies (D) (Note: This poll was sponsored by Progress Georgia, an organization affiliated with the Georgia Democratic Party.)	October 30 – November 1, 2022	700 (RV)	± 3.7%	49%	45%	4%	–	2%
Emerson College	October 28–31, 2022	1,000 (LV)	± 3.0%	49%	47%	1%	1% (Note: "Someone else" with 1%)	2%
Emerson College	October 28–31, 2022	1,000 (LV)	± 3.0%	50%	48%	2%	1%	–
Fox News	October 26–30, 2022	1,002 (RV)	± 3.0%	44%	43%	–	6% (Note: "Other" with 4%; "Wouldn't vote" with 2%)	6%
InsiderAdvantage (R)	October 27, 2022	550 (LV)	± 4.2%	45%	48%	2%	<1% (Note: "Other" with <1%)	5%
Siena College/NYT	October 24–27, 2022	604 (LV)	± 4.8%	49%	46%	1%	–	4%
University of Georgia	October 16–27, 2022	1,022 (LV)	± 3.1%	45%	46%	5%	–	5%
co/efficient (R)	October 24–25, 2022	946 (LV)	± 3.2%	44%	47%	3%	–	6%
Moore Information Group (R)	October 22–25, 2022	800 (LV)	± 3.0%	42%	46%	3%	–	–
Rasmussen Reports (R)	October 23–24, 2022	1,053 (LV)	± 3.0%	43%	48%	–	4% (Note: "Some other candidate" with 4%)	4%
The Trafalgar Group (R) (Note: This poll was sponsored by The Daily Wire)	October 21–23, 2022	1,076 (LV)	± 2.9%	47%	49%	5%	–	–
East Carolina University	October 13–18, 2022	905 (LV)	± 3.8%	49%	47%	–	2% (Note: "Some other candidate" with 2%)	3%
Landmark Communications	October 15–17, 2022	500 (LV)	± 4.4%	46%	46%	3%	–	2%
Data for Progress (D)	October 13–17, 2022	984 (LV)	± 3.0%	48%	47%	3%	–	3%
InsiderAdvantage (R)	October 16, 2022	550 (LV)	± 4.2%	46%	43%	4%	1% (Note: "Other" with 1%)	6%
Wick Insights (R)	October 8–14, 2022	1,018 (LV)	± 3.1%	46%	46%	–	3% (Note: "Someone else" with 3%)	5%
Civiqs	October 8–11, 2022	717 (LV)	± 4.6%	49%	46%	–	3%	1%
Moore Information Group (R)	October 8–11, 2022	800 (LV)	± 3.0%	44%	46%	4%	–	–
The Trafalgar Group (R)	October 8–11, 2022	1,084 (LV)	± 2.9%	46%	45%	4%	–	5%
Quinnipiac University	October 7–10, 2022	1,157 (LV)	± 2.9%	52%	45%	–	1% (Note: "Wouldn't vote" with 1%)	1%
Emerson College	October 6–7, 2022	1,000 (LV)	± 3.0%	48%	46%	1%	1%	4%
InsiderAdvantage (R)	October 4, 2022	550 (LV)	± 4.2%	47%	44%	3%	1%	5%
SurveyUSA	September 30 – October 4, 2022	1,076 (LV)	± 3.7%	50%	38%	–	5% (Note: "Other candidate" with 5%)	7%
University of Georgia	September 25 – October 4, 2022	1,030 (LV)	± 3.1%	46%	43%	4%	–	6%
Fox News	September 22–26, 2022	1,011 (RV)	± 3.0%	46%	41%	–	6% (Note: "Other" with 3%; "Wouldn't vote" with 3%)	7%
Data for Progress (D)	September 16–20, 2022	1,006 (RV)	± 3.0%	46%	46%	4%	–	3%
YouGov/CBS News	September 14–19, 2022	1,178 (RV)	± 4.0%	51%	49%	–	–	0%
University of Georgia	September 5–16, 2022	861 (LV)	± 3.3%	44%	46%	–	3%	7%
Marist College	September 12–15, 2022	1,202 (RV)	± 3.6%	47%	42%	4%	–	7%
Marist College	September 12–15, 2022	992 (LV)	± 4.0%	47%	45%	4%	–	4%
Kurt Jetta (D) (Note: This poll was sponsored by Center Street PAC, which opposes Walker)	September 9–12, 2022	949 (RV)	± 3.5%	50%	37%	–	–	13%
Kurt Jetta (D)	September 9–12, 2022	542 (LV)	± 3.5%	49%	45%	–	–	7%
Quinnipiac University	September 8–12, 2022	1,278 (LV)	± 2.7%	52%	46%	–	1%	2%
Echelon Insights	August 31 – September 7, 2022	751 (LV)	± 4.4%	50%	40%	–	–	10%
InsiderAdvantage (R)	September 6–7, 2022	550 (LV)	± 4.2%	44%	47%	4%	–	5%
Emerson College	August 28–29, 2022	600 (LV)	± 3.9%	44%	46%	–	4%	7%
The Trafalgar Group (R)	August 24–27, 2022	1,079 (LV)	± 2.9%	47%	48%	3%	–	3%
Phillips Academy	August 3–7, 2022	971 (RV)	± 3.1%	44%	45%	–	–	11%
Research Affiliates (D) (Note: This poll was sponsored by Charlie Bailey's campaign for lieutenant governor)	July 26 – August 1, 2022	420 (LV)	± 4.8%	49%	46%	–	–	5%
InsiderAdvantage (R)	July 26–27, 2022	750 (LV)	± 3.6%	48%	45%	3%	1%	3%
Fox News	July 22–26, 2022	908 (RV)	± 3.0%	46%	42%	–	1%	9%
PEM Management Corporation (R) (Note: This poll was conducted for John Bolton Super PAC)	July 22–24, 2022	300 (LV)	± 5.7%	42%	46%	–	3%	9%
SurveyUSA	July 21–24, 2022	604 (LV)	± 5.3%	48%	39%	–	5%	8%
University of Georgia	July 14–22, 2022	902 (LV)	± 3.3%	46%	43%	3%	–	8%
Beacon Research (D) (Note: This poll was sponsored by the Environmental Voter Project)	July 5–20, 2022	1,003 (RV)	± 3.1%	48%	36%	–	2%	11%
Beacon Research (D)	July 5–20, 2022	602 (LV)	± 4.0%	48%	43%	–	1%	7%
Fabrizio Ward (R)/Impact Research (D)	July 5–11, 2022	1,197 (LV)	± 4.4%	50%	47%	–	–	3%
Data for Progress (D)	July 1–6, 2022	1,131 (LV)	± 3.0%	47%	49%	–	–	4%
Change Research (D) (Note: This poll was sponsored by Future Majority and America's Future Majority Fund)	June 24–27, 2022	704 (LV)	± 3.7%	48%	44%	–	–	8%
Quinnipiac University	June 23–27, 2022	1,497 (RV)	± 2.5%	54%	44%	–	0%	3%
Moore Information Group (R)	June 11–16, 2022	800 (LV)	± 3.0%	47%	47%	–	–	6%
East Carolina University	June 6–9, 2022	868 (RV)	± 3.9%	47%	47%	–	2%	4%
SurveyUSA	April 22–27, 2022	1,278 (LV)	± 3.4%	50%	45%	–	–	5%
Grassroots Targeting (R)	April 3–16, 2022	2,500 (RV)	± 2.0%	41%	51%	–	–	8%
Emerson College	April 1–3, 2022	1,013 (RV)	± 3.0%	45%	49%	–	–	6%
Blueprint Polling (D)	March 2–8, 2022	662 (LV)	± 3.9%	45%	49%	–	–	6%
Change Research (D)	March 2022	– (LV)	–	48%	49%	–	–	3%
Wick Insights (R)	February 2–6, 2022	1,290 (LV)	± 2.7%	46%	47%	–	–	8%
Quinnipiac University	January 19–24, 2022	1,702 (RV)	± 2.4%	48%	49%	–	0%	3%
University of Georgia	January 13–24, 2022	872 (RV)	± 3.3%	44%	47%	–	1%	8%
NRSC (R) (Note: This poll was sponsored by the National Republican Senatorial Committee)	December 4–8, 2021	831 (LV)	± 3.4%	48%	49%	–	–	3%
Redfield & Wilton Strategies	November 9, 2021	753 (RV)	± 3.6%	45%	39%	–	2%	8%
Redfield & Wilton Strategies	November 9, 2021	733 (LV)	± 3.6%	48%	42%	–	2%	6%
Public Policy Polling (D)	August 4–5, 2021	622 (V)	± 3.9%	48%	46%	–	–	6%
The Trafalgar Group/InsiderAdvantage (R)	March 7–9, 2021	1,093 (LV)	± 2.9%	46%	48%	–	3%	4%

Hypothetical polling

Raphael Warnock vs. Gary Black

Poll source	Date(s) administered	Sample size	Margin of error	Raphael Warnock (D)	Gary Black (R)	Other	Undecided
University of Georgia	January 13–24, 2022	872 (RV)	± 3.3%	46%	41%	1%	11%
Public Policy Polling (D)	August 4–5, 2021	622 (V)	± 3.9%	46%	38%	–	16%

Raphael Warnock vs. Kelly Loeffler

Poll source	Date(s) administered	Sample size	Margin of error	Raphael Warnock (D)	Kelly Loeffler (R)	Other	Undecided
Public Policy Polling (D)	August 4–5, 2021	622 (V)	± 3.9%	47%	44%	–	9%
The Trafalgar Group/InsiderAdvantage (R)	March 7–9, 2021	1,093 (LV)	± 2.9%	46%	41%	8%	5%

Raphael Warnock vs. Doug Collins

Poll source	Date(s) administered	Sample size	Margin of error	Raphael Warnock (D)	Doug Collins (R)	Other	Undecided
The Trafalgar Group/InsiderAdvantage (R)	March 7–9, 2021	1,093 (LV)	± 2.9%	46%	45%	5%	5%

Generic Democrat vs. generic Republican

Poll source	Date(s) administered	Sample size	Margin of error	Generic Democrat	Generic Republican	Undecided
Grassroots Targeting (R)	April 3–16, 2022	2,500 (RV)	± 2.0%	40%	52%	8%

=== Results ===
Despite a strong gubernatorial performance by incumbent governor Brian Kemp in his reelection bid, and leading the polls since October, Walker ended up one point behind Warnock and was forced into a runoff. Ticket splitting was evident, as Walker underperformed Brian Kemp by 203,130 votes, while Warnock did 132,444 votes better than Abrams.

2022 United States Senate election in Georgia
Party	Candidate	Votes	%	±%
Democratic	Raphael Warnock (incumbent)	1,946,117	49.44%	N/A
Republican	Herschel Walker	1,908,442	48.49%	N/A
Libertarian	Chase Oliver	81,365	2.07%	+1.35%
Total votes		3,935,924	100.0%	

==== By county ====
County	Raphael Warnock Democratic		Herschel Walker Republican		Various candidates Other parties		Margin		Total votes cast
County	#	%	#	%	#	%	#	%	Total votes cast
Appling	1,260	18.92%	5,344	80.24%	65	0.98%	-4,084	-61.32%	6,660
Atkinson	502	22.43%	1,709	76.36%	27	1.21%	-1,207	-53.93%	2,238
Bacon	458	12.35%	3,204	86.36%	48	1.29%	-2,746	-74.02%	3,710
Baker	526	42.11%	711	56.93%	12	0.96%	-185	-14.81%	1,249
Baldwin	7,327	48.99%	7,416	49.58%	214	1.43%	-89	-0.59%	14,957
Banks	772	10.59%	6,362	87.23%	159	2.18%	-5,590	-76.65%	7,293
Barrow	8,244	28.16%	20,136	68.79%	893	3.05%	-11,892	-40.62%	29,273
Bartow	9,349	23.51%	29,361	73.84%	1,053	2.65%	-20,012	-50.33%	39,763
Ben Hill	1,767	34.82%	3,235	63.74%	73	1.44%	-1,468	-28.93%	5,075
Berrien	909	15.18%	5,002	83.51%	79	1.32%	-4,093	-68.33%	5,990
Bibb	33,105	61.30%	20,203	37.41%	699	1.29%	12,902	23.89%	54,007
Bleckley	1,039	21.69%	3,675	76.71%	77	1.61%	-2,636	-55.02%	4,791
Brantley	477	8.16%	5,275	90.23%	94	1.61%	-4,798	-82.07%	5,846
Brooks	1,999	35.67%	3,528	62.96%	77	1.37%	-1,529	-27.28%	5,604
Bryan	5,404	31.93%	11,143	65.83%	379	2.24%	-5,739	-33.91%	16,926
Bulloch	8,195	34.92%	14,858	63.31%	416	1.77%	-6,663	-28.39%	23,469
Burke	3,885	45.98%	4,462	52.81%	102	1.21%	-577	-6.83%	8,449
Butts	2,666	27.68%	6,784	70.43%	182	1.89%	-4,118	-42.75%	9,632
Calhoun	963	56.71%	724	42.64%	11	0.65%	239	14.08%	1,698
Camden	5,758	33.62%	11,698	64.35%	417	2.03%	-5,940	-30.73%	17,873
Candler	950	26.90%	2,552	72.27%	29	0.82%	-1,602	-45.37%	3,531
Carroll	12,582	28.92%	29,838	68.58%	1,087	2.50%	-17,256	-39.66%	43,507
Catoosa	5,282	21.65%	18,562	76.07%	558	2.29%	-13,280	-54.42%	24,402
Charlton	780	23.03%	2,552	75.35%	55	1.62%	-1,772	-52.32%	3,387
Chatham	62,996	59.43%	41,189	38.86%	1,816	1.71%	21,807	20.57%	106,001
Chattahoochee	453	44.63%	538	53.00%	24	2.36%	-85	-8.37%	1,015
Chattooga	1,514	19.76%	5,977	78.00%	172	2.24%	-4,463	-58.24%	7,663
Cherokee	34,987	29.25%	80,811	67.55%	3,833	3.20%	-45,824	-38.30%	119,631
Clarke	28,566	71.10%	10,810	26.91%	800	1.99%	17,756	44.20%	40,176
Clay	572	51.07%	528	47.14%	20	1.79%	44	3.93%	1,120
Clayton	73,412	87.45%	9,450	11.26%	1,090	1.30%	63,962	76.19%	83,952
Clinch	439	20.86%	1,630	77.47%	35	1.66%	-1,191	-56.61%	2,104
Cobb	176,385	56.78%	125,795	40.49%	8,472	2.73%	50,590	16.29%	310,652
Coffee	3,216	27.13%	8,447	71.27%	189	1.59%	-5,231	-44.14%	11,852
Colquitt	2,966	23.64%	9,390	74.83%	192	1.53%	-6,424	-51.20%	12,548
Columbia	22,965	35.66%	40,172	62.38%	1,257	1.95%	-17,207	-26.72%	64,394
Cook	1,497	27.04%	3,944	71.23%	96	1.73%	-2,447	-44.19%	5,537
Coweta	20,169	31.84%	41,512	65.52%	1,674	2.64%	-21,343	-33.69%	63,355
Crawford	1,298	26.95%	3,440	71.43%	78	1.62%	-2,142	-44.48%	4,816
Crisp	2,164	34.32%	4,058	64.35%	84	1.33%	-1,894	-30.03%	6,306
Dade	996	17.11%	4,698	80.71%	127	2.18%	-3,702	-63.60%	5,821
Dawson	2,277	16.42%	11,185	80.64%	408	2.94%	-8,908	-64.22%	13,870
Decatur	3,303	37.37%	5,433	61.46%	103	1.17%	-2,130	-24.10%	8,839
DeKalb	250,761	84.27%	41,951	14.10%	4,858	1.63%	208,810	70.17%	297,570
Dodge	1,640	24.82%	4,895	74.08%	73	1.10%	-3,255	-49.26%	6,608
Dooly	1,461	44.58%	1,784	54.44%	32	0.98%	-323	-9.86%	3,277
Dougherty	18,603	69.90%	7,755	29.14%	256	0.96%	10,848	40.76%	26,614
Douglas	34,158	64.76%	17,589	33.35%	999	1.89%	16,569	31.41%	52,746
Early	1,650	42.45%	2,209	56.83%	28	0.72%	-559	-14.38%	3,887
Echols	100	9.43%	937	88.40%	23	2.17%	-837	-78.96%	1,060
Effingham	6,473	25.58%	18,231	72.04%	604	2.39%	-11,758	-46.46%	25,308
Elbert	2,077	28.44%	5,135	70.32%	90	1.23%	-3,058	-41.88%	7,302
Emanuel	2,157	28.59%	5,329	70.64%	58	0.77%	-3,172	-42.05%	7,544
Evans	968	29.02%	2,314	69.36%	54	1.62%	-1,346	-40.35%	3,336
Fannin	2,230	17.76%	10,036	79.93%	290	2.31%	-7,806	-62.17%	12,556
Fayette	28,284	47.17%	30,178	50.33%	1,496	2.50%	-1,894	-3.16%	59,958
Floyd	9,160	28.72%	21,923	68.73%	813	2.55%	-12,763	-40.01%	31,896
Forsyth	32,852	32.25%	66,013	64.81%	2,988	2.93%	-33,161	-32.56%	101,853
Franklin	1,166	13.40%	7,374	84.72%	164	1.88%	-6,208	-71.32%	8,704
Fulton	307,560	73.55%	102,758	24.57%	7,854	1.88%	204,802	48.98%	418,172
Gilmer	2,523	18.01%	11,159	79.67%	325	2.32%	-8,636	-61.65%	14,007
Glascock	113	8.73%	1,171	90.42%	11	0.85%	-1,058	-81.70%	1,295
Glynn	11,812	35.64%	20,735	62.56%	597	1.80%	-8,923	-26.92%	33,144
Gordon	3,357	17.87%	14,955	79.60%	475	2.53%	-11,598	-61.73%	18,787
Grady	2,573	30.96%	5,638	67.84%	100	1.20%	-3,065	-36.88%	8,311
Greene	3,527	33.84%	6,741	64.67%	156	1.50%	-3,214	-30.83%	10,424
Gwinnett	175,688	58.95%	115,024	38.59%	7,324	2.46%	60,664	20.36%	298,036
Habersham	2,887	17.11%	13,509	80.06%	478	2.83%	-10,622	-62.95%	16,874
Hall	19,196	26.29%	51,643	70.74%	2,166	2.97%	-32,447	-44.44%	73,005
Hancock	2,373	69.96%	989	29.16%	30	0.88%	1,384	40.80%	3,392
Haralson	1,498	12.92%	9,789	84.42%	308	2.66%	-8,291	-71.50%	11,595
Harris	4,546	26.81%	12,072	71.20%	338	1.99%	-7,526	-44.39%	16,956
Hart	2,322	22.12%	7,979	76.03%	194	1.85%	-5,657	-53.90%	10,495
Heard	675	15.20%	3,673	82.71%	93	2.09%	-2,998	-67.51%	4,441
Henry	60,756	63.80%	32,819	34.46%	1,654	1.74%	27,937	29.34%	95,229
Houston	25,657	43.49%	32,239	54.65%	1,095	1.86%	-6,582	-11.16%	58,991
Irwin	757	22.24%	2,601	76.41%	46	1.35%	-1,844	-54.17%	3,404
Jackson	6,504	20.51%	24,379	76.89%	823	2.60%	-17,875	-56.38%	31,706
Jasper	1,464	22.40%	4,951	75.76%	120	1.84%	-3,487	-53.36%	6,535
Jeff Davis	738	16.30%	3,738	82.57%	51	1.13%	-3,000	-66.27%	4,527
Jefferson	3,158	50.50%	3,041	48.63%	54	0.86%	117	1.87%	6,253
Jenkins	912	33.01%	1,826	66.09%	25	0.90%	-914	-33.08%	3,455
Johnson	869	25.79%	2,484	73.71%	17	0.50%	-1,615	-47.92%	3,370
Jones	3,990	32.52%	8,089	65.92%	191	1.56%	-4,099	-33.41%	12,270
Lamar	2,139	27.73%	5,416	70.22%	158	2.05%	-3,277	-42.49%	7,713
Lanier	725	27.64%	1,860	70.91%	38	1.45%	-1,135	-43.27%	2,623
Laurens	6,285	33.95%	12,073	65.21%	155	0.84%	-5,788	-31.26%	18,513
Lee	3,779	27.92%	9,535	70.45%	221	1.63%	-5,756	-42.53%	13,535
Liberty	9,615	62.56%	5,490	35.72%	264	1.72%	4,125	26.84%	15,369
Lincoln	1,077	27.11%	2,847	71.66%	49	1.23%	-1,770	-44.55%	3,973
Long	1,548	35.17%	2,759	62.68%	95	2.16%	-1,211	-27.51%	4,402
Lowndes	13,849	40.01%	20,213	58.40%	550	1.59%	-6,364	-18.39%	34,612
Lumpkin	2,539	20.04%	9,765	77.05%	369	2.91%	-7,226	-57.02%	12,673
Macon	2,269	60.33%	1,460	38.82%	32	0.85%	809	21.51%	3,761
Madison	2,864	22.95%	9,353	74.95%	262	2.10%	-6,489	-52.00%	12,479
Marion	1,018	35.92%	1,750	61.75%	66	2.33%	-732	-25.83%	2,834
McDuffie	3,103	37.38%	5,067	61.04%	131	1.58%	-1,964	-23.66%	8,301
McIntosh	2,048	37.33%	3,344	60.94%	95	1.73%	-1,296	-23.62%	5,487
Meriwether	3,363	37.90%	5,336	60.14%	175	1.97%	-1,973	-22.24%	8,873
Miller	509	23.70%	1,617	75.28%	22	1.02%	-1,108	-51.58%	2,148
Mitchell	2,953	42.07%	3,986	56.78%	81	1.15%	-1,033	-14.72%	7,020
Monroe	3,737	27.35%	9,673	70.79%	255	1.87%	-5,936	-43.44%	13,665
Montgomery	742	23.00%	2,450	75.95%	34	1.05%	-1,708	-52.94%	3,226
Morgan	2,762	26.93%	7,322	71.38%	174	1.70%	-4,560	-44.45%	10,258
Murray	1,533	13.37%	9,737	84.90%	199	1.74%	-8,204	-71.53%	11,469
Muscogee	36,861	62.22%	21,496	36.28%	887	1.50%	15,365	25.94%	59,244
Newton	24,348	57.01%	17,577	41.16%	783	1.83%	6,771	15.85%	42,708
Oconee	6,987	31.36%	14,681	65.88%	615	2.76%	-7,694	-34.53%	22,283
Oglethorpe	1,996	29.41%	4,638	68.35%	152	2.24%	-3,153	-38.93%	6,786
Paulding	24,389	36.56%	40,689	60.99%	1,635	2.45%	-16,300	-24.43%	66,713
Peach	4,701	47.01%	5,156	51.56%	143	1.43%	-455	-4.55%	10,000
Pickens	2,589	17.26%	12,050	80.32%	364	2.43%	-9,461	-63.06%	15,003
Pierce	779	10.87%	6,325	88.25%	63	0.88%	-5,546	-77.38%	7,167
Pike	1,257	13.38%	7,948	84.59%	191	2.03%	-6,691	-71.21%	9,396
Polk	2,794	20.60%	10,426	76.87%	343	2.53%	-7,632	-56.27%	13,563
Pulaski	1,002	29.77%	2,319	68.89%	45	1.34%	-1,317	-39.13%	3,366
Putnam	2,847	27.91%	7,164	70.22%	191	1.87%	-4,317	-42.32%	10,202
Quitman	378	41.91%	511	56.65%	13	1.44%	-133	-14.74%	902
Rabun	1,804	21.98%	6,180	75.30%	223	2.72%	-4,376	-53.32%	8,207
Randolph	1,366	53.63%	1,158	45.47%	23	0.90%	208	8.17%	2,547
Richmond	43,567	68.14%	19,491	30.48%	880	1.38%	24,076	37.66%	63,938
Rockdale	25,478	73.27%	8,722	25.08%	574	1.65%	16,756	48.19%	34,774
Schley	384	20.54%	1,467	78.45%	19	1.02%	-1,083	-57.91%	1,870
Screven	2,009	38.01%	3,203	60.61%	73	1.38%	-1,194	-22.59%	5,285
Seminole	827	27.36%	2,152	71.19%	44	1.46%	-1,325	-43.83%	3,888
Spalding	9,761	40.23%	13,966	57.56%	535	2.21%	-4,205	-17.33%	24,262
Stephens	1,762	18.88%	7,374	79.01%	197	2.11%	-5,612	-60.13%	9,333
Stewart	916	58.46%	638	40.71%	13	0.83%	278	17.74%	1,567
Sumter	4,894	51.09%	4,590	47.91%	96	1.00%	304	3.17%	9,580
Talbot	1,688	59.25%	1,118	39.24%	43	1.51%	570	20.01%	2,849
Taliaferro	483	60.60%	310	38.90%	4	0.50%	173	21.71%	797
Tattnall	1,525	23.46%	4,866	74.86%	109	1.68%	-3,341	-51.40%	6,500
Taylor	1,145	35.78%	2,020	63.13%	35	1.09%	-875	-27.34%	3,200
Telfair	1,032	30.35%	2,340	68.82%	28	0.82%	-1,308	-38.47%	3,400
Terrell	1,904	52.34%	1,695	46.59%	39	1.07%	209	5.74%	3,638
Thomas	6,436	37.46%	10,481	61.01%	263	1.53%	-4,045	-23.55%	17,180
Tift	3,878	29.89%	8,921	68.76%	176	1.36%	-5,043	-38.87%	12,975
Toombs	2,062	24.37%	6,298	74.44%	100	1.18%	-4,236	-50.07%	8,460
Towns	1,362	19.16%	5,568	78.32%	179	2.52%	-4,206	-59.16%	7,109
Treutlen	711	29.09%	1,721	70.42%	12	0.49%	-1,010	-41.33%	2,444
Troup	8,806	38.01%	13,937	60.15%	426	1.84%	-5,131	-22.15%	23,169
Turner	1,152	37.33%	1,892	61.31%	42	1.36%	-740	-23.98%	3,086
Twiggs	1,601	45.33%	1,886	53.40%	45	1.27%	-285	-8.07%	3,532
Union	2,621	18.48%	11,186	78.86%	378	2.66%	-8,565	-60.38%	14,185
Upson	3,173	31.53%	6,685	66.42%	206	2.05%	-3,512	-34.90%	10,064
Walker	4,377	19.92%	17,064	77.66%	531	2.42%	-12,687	-57.74%	21,972
Walton	10,702	25.32%	30,553	72.30%	1,004	2.38%	-19,851	-46.97%	42,259
Ware	2,976	27.80%	7,567	70.69%	161	1.50%	-4,591	-42.89%	10,704
Warren	1,117	51.98%	1,007	46.86%	25	1.16%	110	5.12%	2,149
Washington	3,793	48.86%	3,904	50.29%	66	0.85%	-111	-1.43%	-7,763
Wayne	2,014	20.16%	7,838	78.47%	136	1.36%	-5,824	-58.31%	9,988
Webster	442	39.29%	676	60.09%	7	0.62%	-234	-20.80%	1,125
Wheeler	534	29.39%	1,266	69.67%	17	0.94%	-732	-40.29%	1,817
White	2,063	16.30%	10,249	80.96%	348	2.75%	-8,186	-64.66%	12,660
Whitfield	6,904	25.68%	19,387	72.10%	597	2.22%	-12,483	-46.43%	26,888
Wilcox	644	24.65%	1,947	74.51%	22	0.84%	-1,303	-49.87%	2,613
Wilkes	1,680	40.70%	2,402	58.19%	46	1.11%	-722	-17.49%	4,128
Wilkinson	1,728	42.74%	2,272	56.20%	43	1.06%	-544	-13.46%	4,043
Worth	1,842	25.03%	5,416	73.61%	100	1.36%	-3,574	-48.57%	7,358
Totals	1,946,117	49.44%	1,908,442	48.49%	81,365	2.07%	37,675	0.95%	3,935,924

==== By congressional district ====
Walker won nine of 14 congressional districts.

District	Warnock	Walker	Representative
1st	42%	56%	Buddy Carter
2nd	54%	45%	Sanford Bishop
3rd	34%	63%	Drew Ferguson
4th	80%	19%	Hank Johnson
5th	84%	14%	Nikema Williams
6th	41%	56%	Lucy McBath (117th Congress)
6th	41%	56%	Rich McCormick (118th Congress)
7th	63%	35%	Carolyn Bourdeaux (117th Congress)
7th	63%	35%	Lucy McBath (118th Congress)
8th	34%	64%	Austin Scott
9th	29%	68%	Andrew Clyde
10th	38%	60%	Jody Hice (117th Congress)
10th	38%	60%	Mike Collins (118th Congress)
11th	41%	56%	Barry Loudermilk
12th	43%	56%	Rick Allen
13th	82%	16%	David Scott
14th	31%	67%	Marjorie Taylor Greene

==== Voter demographics ====
Voter demographic data for 2022 was collected by CNN. The voter survey is based on exit polls completed by voters in person as well as by phone. One key to Warnock's victory was winning voters with graduate degrees 60-38%, as he lost all other educational groups. Warnock also won voters under 50 by large margins, offsetting his losses among older voters.

2022 United States Senate election voter demographics in Georgia (CNN)
Demographic subgroup	Warnock	Walker	Oliver	% of total vote
Ideology
Liberals	93	5	2	18
Moderates	66	32	2	41
Conservatives	11	88	1	41
Party
Democrats	97	2	0	35
Republicans	4	95	1	41
Independents	53	42	4	24
Gender
Men	44	54	2	47
Women	53	45	1	53
Marital status
Married	47	53	1	64
Unmarried	60	37	1	36
Gender by marital status
Married men	38	60	2	31
Married women	44	55	1	31
Unmarried men	58	39	3	15
Unmarried women	65	33	1	23
Race/ethnicity
White	29	70	1	62
Black	90	8	1	28
Latino	58	39	3	6
Asian	59	39	2	2
Other racial/ethnic groups	53	41	4	3
Gender by race
White men	27	71	2	31
White women	30	68	1	30
Black men	85	12	2	11
Black women	93	5	1	17
Latino men	61	37	2	3
Latina women	55	41	4	4
All other races	55	40	3	4
Age
18–24 years old	69	28	3	6
25–29 years old	57	40	2	6
30–39 years old	57	40	3	14
40–49 years old	52	46	1	17
50–64 years old	44	54	1	32
65 and older	41	58	1	25
2020 presidential vote
Biden	97	3	0	43
Trump	4	95	1	48
First time midterm election voter
Yes	52	44	4	8
No	46	52	1	92
Education
Never attended college	39	59	1	16
Some college education	49	50	1	27
Associate degree	48	49	3	16
Bachelor's degree	47	51	2	23
Advanced degree	60	38	2	17
Education by race
White college graduates	40	58	2	27
White no college degree	19	79	1	34
Non-white college graduates	78	20	1	13
Non-white no college degree	82	15	2	25
Education by gender/race
White women with college degrees	44	54	1	13
White women without college degrees	20	79	1	17
White men with college degrees	36	61	2	14
White men without college degrees	19	80	1	18
Non-white	81	17	2	38
Issue regarded as most important
Crime	50	48	2	13
Abortion	77	21	1	26
Inflation	27	72	1	37
Gun Policy	58	40	1	10
Immigration	15	83	2	7
Feelings about Roe v. Wade being overturned
Enthusiastic/satisfied	16	83	1	43
Dissatisfied/angry	77	20	2	53
Abortion should be
Legal	75	23	1	53
Illegal	11	87	1	43
Area type
Urban	68	31	1	20
Suburban	48	49	2	53
Rural	35	65	1	27

== Runoff election ==
Following the projection of incumbent Democratic senator Catherine Cortez Masto's victory in Nevada, it became clear that, unlike in the previous cycle, the results of the Georgia runoff would not determine control of the United States Senate. With all Democratic incumbents besides Warnock winning re-election and Democrat John Fetterman flipping an open seat in Pennsylvania that had been held by retiring Republican Pat Toomey, Democrats held their majority in the Senate. (Note: Two independent senators caucus with Senate Democrats and Democratic Vice President Kamala Harris casts the tie-breaking vote.) Nevertheless, national Democrats and Republicans began spending on advertising and volunteer mobilization efforts as soon as it became apparent that a runoff election would be necessary. Historically, runoff elections in Georgia have favored Republicans as turnout decreased disproportionately amongst Democratic voters, but in 2021, with Senate control to be determined, turnout was historically high, and Democrats won both races. Prior to the runoff, elections analysts questioned whether Georgia voters would turn out in such high numbers again and tried to determine which candidate's coalition of supporters would be more likely to turn out. This was the fifth runoff in the state's history.

The early vote window was shorter in 2022 than in 2021 due to Georgia's Election Integrity Act of 2021, which reduced the gap between general and runoff elections from nine to four weeks. State officials also said that there could be no weekend early voting: Georgia state law bars early voting from taking place the Saturday immediately before an election (December 3), and Georgia Secretary of State Brad Raffensperger argued that early voting also could not take place the next preceding Saturday (November 26), as it fell two days after Thanksgiving (November 24) and the day after a Georgia state holiday established to commemorate Confederate general Robert E. Lee's birthday (November 25). (Note: While Lee's birthday was January 19, the state of Georgia had traditionally observed the holiday on the Friday after Thanksgiving. Since 2016, Georgia no longer references Lee on its official calendar, but the day is still observed as a state holiday and government operations are closed.) On Friday, November 18, a Fulton County Superior Court judge ruled that, despite the holidays, county boards of election could legally offer early voting on Saturday, November 26; that decision was upheld by the Georgia Court of Appeals on Monday, November 21, and by the Supreme Court of Georgia on Wednesday, November 23. Ultimately, 27 of Georgia's 159 counties chose to offer early voting on Saturday, including the state's four largest counties, Fulton, Gwinnett, Cobb, and DeKalb.

While Democrats retained control of the Senate during the 118th Congress regardless of the outcome of the Georgia runoff, Warnock's victory affected the functioning of that majority. During the 117th Congress, Senate Democrats made power-sharing agreements with Republicans, such as evenly dividing committee memberships between the two parties and giving Republicans greater ability to delay judicial appointments; with Warnock's win, Democrats attained an outright 51–49 majority, allowing them to take full control of Senate committees and expedite judicial confirmations. Looking beyond the 118th Congress, many analysts had noted that the outcome of this race would affect Democrats' prospects in the 2024 U.S. Senate elections. Election forecasters had noted that Democrats held a number of seats up for election in 2024 which would be difficult for the party to defend, (Note: Three Class 1 Democrats represent states won by Trump in 2020 (Montana, Ohio, and West Virginia), while no Class 1 Republicans represent states won by Biden. In addition, five Class 1 Democrats represent states won by Biden by less than his national popular vote margin (Arizona, Michigan, Nevada, Pennsylvania, and Wisconsin).) and therefore that holding Georgia's seat bolstered the party's chances to maintain Senate control going forward.

According to Ron Brownstein of CNN in 2023, Warnock won independent voters by double-digit margins, which contributed to Walker's defeat.

=== Predictions ===
Source	Ranking	As of
The Cook Political Report	Tossup	November 18, 2022
Inside Elections	Tilt D	December 1, 2022
Sabato's Crystal Ball	Lean D	December 5, 2022
DDHQ	Lean D	December 6, 2022

=== Polling ===
Aggregate polls

Source of poll aggregation	Dates administered	Dates updated	Raphael Warnock (D)	Herschel Walker (R)	Undecided	Margin
Real Clear Politics	November 11 – December 4, 2022	December 5, 2022	51.0%	47.3%	1.5%	Warnock +3.7
FiveThirtyEight	November 26 – December 5, 2022	December 5, 2022	51.1%	47.2%	2.1%	Warnock +3.9
270ToWin	November 22 – December 5, 2022	December 5, 2022	51.0%	47.7%	1.5%	Warnock +3.3
Average			51.0%	47.4%	1.7%	Warnock +3.6

View source data.

Poll source	Date(s) administered	Sample size	Margin of error	Raphael Warnock (D)	Herschel Walker (R)	Other	Undecided
The Trafalgar Group (R)	December 3–5, 2022	1,099 (LV)	± 2.9%	51%	47%	–	2%
Data for Progress (D)	December 1–5, 2022	1,229 (LV)	± 3.0%	51%	49%	–	–
InsiderAdvantage (R)	December 4, 2022	750 (LV)	± 3.6%	51%	48%	–	1%
Landmark Communications	December 4, 2022	800 (LV)	± 3.5%	52%	47%	–	1%
Mitchell Research	December 4, 2022	625 (LV)	± 3.6%	50%	45%	–	5%
Patriot Polling	November 30 – December 2, 2022	818 (RV)	–	49%	47%	–	4%
Emerson College	November 28–30, 2022	888 (LV)	± 3.2%	51%	49%	–	–
Emerson College	November 28–30, 2022	888 (LV)	± 3.2%	49%	47%	–	4%
SurveyUSA	November 26–30, 2022	1,214 (LV)	± 3.6%	50%	47%	–	3%
SurveyUSA	November 26–30, 2022	1,214 (LV)	± 3.6%	50%	46%	–	4%
CNN/SSRS	November 25–29, 2022	1,886 (RV)	± 3.0%	51%	44%	5% (Note: "Do not plan to vote" with 5%)	–
CNN/SSRS	November 25–29, 2022	1,184 (LV)	± 3.8%	52%	48%	1% (Note: "Do not plan to vote" with 1%)	–
UMass Lowell/YouGov	November 18–28, 2022	1,300 (LV)	± 3.2%	51%	46%	–	2%
Phillips Academy	November 26–27, 2022	862 (LV)	± 3.3%	47%	48%	–	5%
Frederick Polls (D) (Note: Poll conducted for COMPETE Everywhere, a digital marketing firm associated with the Democratic Party.)	November 23–26, 2022	939 (LV)	± 3.1%	50%	50%	–	–
Fabrizio Ward (R)/Impact Research (D)	November 11–17, 2022	500 (LV)	± 4.4%	51%	47%	–	2%

=== Results ===
Warnock won Washington and Baldwin counties in the runoff, after having lost them in the general election, although he did win them in 2020.

2022 United States Senate runoff election in Georgia
Party	Candidate	Votes	%	±%
Democratic	Raphael Warnock (incumbent)	1,820,633	51.40%	+0.36%
Republican	Herschel Walker	1,721,244	48.60%	−0.36%
Total votes		3,541,877	100.0%	
Democratic hold				

==== By county ====
County	Raphael Warnock Democratic		Herschel Walker Republican		Margin		Total votes cast
County	#	%	#	%	#	%	Total votes cast
Appling	1,222	19.51%	5,043	80.49%	-3,821	-60.98%	6,265
Atkinson	485	31.824%	1,039	68.176%	-554	-36.352%	1,524
Bacon	441	12.64%	3,047	87.36%	-2,606	-74.72%	3,488
Baker	481	42.49%	651	57.51%	-170	-15.02%	1,132
Baldwin	7,007	50.05%	6,854	49.45%	153	0.60%	13,861
Banks	698	10.70%	5,828	89.30%	-5,130	-78.60%	6,526
Barrow	7,453	29.34%	17,945	70.66%	-10,492	-41.32%	25,398
Bartow	8,550	24.22%	26,750	75.78%	-18,200	-51.56%	35,300
Ben Hill	1,718	36.24%	3,022	63.76%	-1,304	-27.52%	4,740
Berrien	843	15.19%	4,706	84.81%	-3,863	-69.62%	5,549
Bibb	31,017	62.84%	18,342	37.16%	12,675	25.68%	49,359
Bleckley	1,011	22.63%	3,456	77.37%	-2,445	-54.74%	4,467
Brantley	467	8.48%	5,039	91.52%	-4,572	-83.04%	5,506
Brooks	1,844	36.49%	3,209	63.51%	-1,365	-27.02%	5,053
Bryan	5,194	33.64%	10,244	66.36%	-5,050	-32.72%	15,438
Bulloch	7,767	36.42%	13,561	63.58%	-5,794	-27.16%	21,328
Burke	3,778	47.67%	4,148	52.33%	-370	-4.66%	7,926
Butts	2,497	28.64%	6,222	71.38%	-3,725	-42.74%	8,719
Calhoun	925	58.21%	664	41.79%	261	16.42%	1,589
Camden	5,605	34.12%	10,823	65.88%	-5,218	-31.76%	16,428
Candler	940	28.65%	2,341	71.35%	-1,401	-42.70%	3,281
Carroll	11,991	30.32%	27,561	69.68%	-15,570	-39.36%	39,552
Catoosa	4,814	22.18%	16,891	77.82%	-18,235	-55.64%	12,077
Charlton	730	23.50%	2,377	76.50%	-1,647	-53.00%	3,107
Chatham	59,759	61.92%	36,754	38.08%	23,005	23.84%	96,513
Chattahoochee	434	48.12%	468	51.88%	-213	-3.76%	902
Chattooga	1,343	19.63%	5,500	80.37%	-4,157	-60.74%	6,843
Cherokee	32,140	30.92%	71,802	69.08%	-39,662	-38.16%	103,942
Clarke	27,393	73.77%	9,742	26.23%	17,651	47.54%	37,135
Clay	536	52.50%	485	47.50%	51	5.00%	1,021
Clayton	65,976	89.13%	8,044	10.87%	57,932	78.26%	74,020
Clinch	463	23.42%	1,514	76.58%	-1,051	-53.16%	1,977
Cobb	166,346	59.57%	112,920	40.43%	53,426	19.14%	279,266
Coffee	3,149	28.63%	7,850	71.37%	-4,701	-42.74%	10,999
Colquitt	2,791	24.34%	8,678	75.66%	-5,887	-51.32%	11,469
Columbia	21,643	37.33%	36,331	62.67%	-14,688	-25.34%	57,974
Cook	1,452	28.24%	3,689	71.76%	-2,237	-43.52%	5,141
Coweta	17,500	33.26%	35,110	66.74%	-17,610	-33.48%	52,610
Crawford	1,228	27.76%	3,196	72.24%	-1,968	-44.48%	4,424
Crisp	2,035	35.29%	3,732	64.71%	-1,697	-29.42%	5,767
Dade	901	17.68%	4,195	82.32%	-3,294	-64.64%	5,096
Dawson	2,103	17.14%	10,166	82.86%	-8,063	-65.72%	12,269
Decatur	3,088	38.76%	4,880	61.24%	-1,792	-22.48%	7,968
DeKalb	236,930	86.75%	36,186	13.25%	200,744	73.50%	273,116
Dodge	1,620	25.90%	4,634	74.10%	-3,014	-48.29%	6,254
Dooly	1,408	46.12%	1,645	53.88%	-237	-7.76%	3,053
Dougherty	17,839	71.56%	7,091	28.44%	10,748	43.12%	24,930
Douglas	32,399	66.75%	16,142	33.50%	16,257	25.10%	48,541
Early	1,653	45.13%	2,010	54.87%	-357	-9.74%	3,663
Echols	88	9.27%	861	90.73%	-773	-81.46%	949
Effingham	5,985	26.42%	16,668	73.58%	-10,683	-47.16%	22,653
Elbert	1,944	29.20%	4,713	70.80%	-2,769	-41.60%	6,657
Emanuel	2,091	29.35%	5,033	70.65%	-2,942	-41.30%	7,124
Evans	938	30.16%	2,172	69.84%	-1,234	-39.68%	3,110
Fannin	2,046	18.33%	9,116	81.67%	-7,070	-63.34%	11,162
Fayette	26,584	49.55%	27,071	50.45%	-487	-0.90%	53,655
Floyd	8,358	29.50%	19,973	70.50%	-11,615	-41.00%	28,331
Forsyth	30,433	34.30%	58,295	65.70%	-27,862	-31.40%	88,728
Franklin	1,077	13.46%	6,926	86.54%	-5,849	-73.08%	8,003
Fulton	282,116	76.60%	86,174	23.40%	195,942	53.20%	368,290
Gilmer	2,352	18.46%	10,391	81.54%	-8,039	-63.08%	12,743
Glascock	105	8.59%	1,118	91.41%	-1,013	-82.82%	1,223
Glynn	11,423	37.67%	18,900	62.33%	-7,477	-24.66%	30,323
Gordon	3,032	17.74%	14,055	82.26%	-11,023	-64.52%	17,087
Grady	2,449	32.58%	5,067	67.42%	-2,618	-34.84%	7,516
Greene	3,401	35.14%	6,278	64.86%	-2,877	-29.72%	9,679
Gwinnett	165,066	62.13%	100,600	37.87%	64,466	24.26%	265,666
Habersham	2,715	17.65%	12,668	82.35%	-9,953	-64.70%	15,383
Hall	17,826	27.30%	47,471	72.70%	-29,645	-45.40%	65,297
Hancock	2,356	72.14%	910	27.86%	1,446	44.28%	3,266
Haralson	1,373	13.17%	9,051	86.83%	-7,678	-73.66%	10,424
Harris	4,393	28.28%	11,141	71.72%	-6,748	-43.44%	15,534
Hart	2,271	23.23%	7,507	76.77%	-5,236	-53.54%	9,778
Heard	639	15.79%	3,407	84.21%	-2,768	-68.42%	5,394
Henry	55,188	66.26%	28,098	33.74%	27,090	32.52%	83,286
Houston	24,605	45.53%	29,437	54.47%	-4,832	-8.94%	54,042
Irwin	706	22.53%	2,427	77.47%	-1,721	-54.94%	3,133
Jackson	5,854	21.31%	21,613	78.69%	-15,759	-57.38%	27,467
Jasper	1,339	22.66%	4,569	77.34%	-3,230	-54.68%	5,908
Jeff Davis	742	17.61%	3,471	82.39%	-2,729	-64.78%	4,213
Jefferson	3,079	51.53%	2,896	48.47%	183	3.06%	5,975
Jenkins	874	34.67%	1,647	65.33%	-773	-30.66%	2,521
Johnson	967	28.56%	2,419	71.44%	-1,452	-42.88%	3,386
Jones	3,744	33.29%	7,502	66.71%	-3,758	-33.42%	11,246
Lamar	2,008	29.03%	4,910	70.97%	-2,902	-41.94%	6,918
Lanier	701	28.58%	1,752	71.42%	-1,051	-42.84%	2,453
Laurens	6,060	34.80%	11,355	65.20%	-5,295	-30.40%	17,415
Lee	3,562	28.95%	8,743	71.05%	-5,181	-42.10%	12,305
Liberty	9,210	64.72%	5,021	35.28%	4,189	29.44%	14,231
Lincoln	1,043	28.17%	2,660	71.83%	-1,741	-43.66%	3,703
Long	1,472	37.58%	2,445	62.42%	-973	-24.84%	3,917
Lowndes	13,126	41.57%	18,448	58.43%	-5,322	-16.86%	31,574
Lumpkin	2,339	20.62%	9,005	79.38%	-6,666	-58.76%	11,344
Macon	2,185	61.62%	1,361	38.38%	824	23.24%	3,546
Madison	2,712	23.78%	8,694	76.22%	-5,982	-52.44%	11,406
Marion	1,029	38.34%	1,655	61.66%	-626	-23.32%	2,684
McDuffie	2,993	38.82%	4,717	61.18%	-1,724	-22.36%	7,710
McIntosh	2,015	38.78%	3,181	61.22%	-1,166	-22.44%	5,196
Meriwether	3,245	39.26%	5,020	60.74%	-1,775	-21.48%	8,265
Miller	442	22.84%	1,493	77.16%	-1,051	-54.32%	1,935
Mitchell	2,798	42.95%	3,716	57.05%	-918	-14.10%	6,514
Monroe	3,609	28.58%	9,018	71.42%	-5,409	-42.84%	12,627
Montgomery	751	24.73%	2,286	75.27%	-1,535	-50.54%	3,037
Morgan	2,651	27.90%	6,851	72.10%	-4,200	-44.20%	9,502
Murray	1,339	13.09%	8,893	86.91%	-7,554	-73.82%	10,232
Muscogee	35,487	64.62%	19,433	35.38%	16,054	29.24%	54,920
Newton	22,356	58.85%	15,635	41.15%	6,721	17.70%	37,991
Oconee	6,600	32.77%	13,543	67.23%	-6,943	-34.46%	20,143
Oglethorpe	1,917	30.64%	4,340	69.36%	-2,423	-38.72%	6,257
Paulding	22,485	38.19%	36,388	61.81%	-13,903	-23.62%	58,873
Peach	4,433	48.27%	4,751	51.73%	-318	-3.46%	9,184
Pickens	2,355	17.65%	10,986	82.35%	-8,631	-64.70%	13,341
Pierce	771	11.51%	5,929	88.49%	-5,158	-76.98%	6,700
Pike	1,185	13.71%	7,458	86.29%	-6,273	-72.58%	8,643
Polk	2,471	20.63%	9,506	79.37%	-7,035	-58.74%	11,977
Pulaski	986	30.90%	2,205	69.10%	-1,219	-38.20%	3,191
Putnam	2,696	29.02%	6,594	70.98%	-3,898	-41.96%	9,290
Quitman	330	40.89%	477	59.11%	-147	-18.22%	807
Rabun	1,706	22.91%	5,742	77.09%	-4,036	-54.18%	7,448
Randolph	1,351	56.08%	1,058	43.92%	293	12.16%	2,409
Richmond	41,812	69.89%	18,014	30.11%	23,798	39.78%	59,826
Rockdale	23,877	75.49%	7,752	24.51%	16,125	50.98%	31,629
Schley	346	20.05%	1,380	79.95%	-1,034	-59.90%	1,726
Screven	1,910	39.00%	2,987	61.00%	-1,077	-22.00%	4,897
Seminole	793	28.86%	1,955	71.14%	-1,162	-42.28%	2,748
Spalding	8,902	41.35%	12,625	58.65%	-3,723	-17.30%	21,527
Stephens	1,662	19.87%	6,702	80.13%	-5,040	-60.26%	8,364
Stewart	899	62.74%	534	37.26%	365	25.48%	1,433
Sumter	4,649	52.52%	4,203	47.48%	446	5.04%	8,852
Talbot	1,605	60.20%	1,061	39.80%	544	20.40%	2,666
Taliaferro	431	60.28%	284	39.72%	147	20.56%	715
Tattnall	1,440	23.99%	4,562	76.01%	-3,122	-52.02%	6,002
Taylor	1,125	37.45%	1,879	62.55%	-754	-25.10%	3,004
Telfair	1,037	32.21%	2,182	67.79%	-1,145	-35.58%	3,219
Terrell	1,777	53.08%	1,571	46.92%	206	6.16%	3,348
Thomas	6,036	39.02%	9,432	60.98%	-3,396	-21.96%	15,468
Tift	3,796	31.53%	8,243	68.47%	-4,447	-36.94%	12,039
Toombs	1,972	25.44%	5,780	74.56%	-3,808	-49.12%	7,752
Towns	1,280	19.75%	5,201	80.25%	-3,921	-60.50%	6,481
Treutlen	683	29.35%	1,644	70.65%	-961	-41.30%	2,327
Troup	8,339	39.53%	12,757	60.47%	-4,418	-20.94%	21,096
Turner	1,048	37.52%	1,745	62.48%	-697	-24.96%	2,793
Twiggs	1,583	46.81%	1,799	53.19%	-216	-6.38%	3,382
Union	2,426	19.19%	10,214	80.81%	-7,788	-61.62%	12,640
Upson	2,872	32.22%	6,043	67.78%	-3,171	-35.56%	8,915
Walker	3,905	20.11%	15,517	79.89%	-11,612	-59.78%	19,422
Walton	10,089	26.39%	28,147	73.61%	-18,058	-47.22%	38,236
Ware	2,861	29.00%	7,005	71.00%	-4,144	-42.00%	9,866
Warren	1,063	52.57%	959	47.43%	104	5.14%	2,022
Washington	3,754	50.59%	3,667	49.41%	87	1.18%	7,421
Wayne	1,942	21.05%	7,284	78.95%	-7,299	-57.90%	9,226
Webster	420	40.54%	616	59.46%	-196	-18.92%	1,036
Wheeler	492	28.55%	1,231	71.45%	-739	-42.90%	1,723
White	1,900	16.78%	9,422	83.22%	-7,522	-66.44%	11,322
Whitfield	6,061	25.48%	17,726	74.52%	-11,665	-49.04%	23,787
Wilcox	615	25.84%	1,765	74.16%	-1,150	-48.32%	2,380
Wilkes	1,609	41.93%	2,228	58.07%	-619	-16.14%	3,837
Wilkinson	1,678	44.36%	2,105	55.64%	-427	-11.28%	3,783
Worth	1,759	25.66%	5,097	74.34%	-3,338	-48.68%	6,856
Totals	1,820,633	51.40%	1,721,244	48.60%	99,389	2.80%	3,541,877

==== By congressional district ====
Despite losing the state, Walker won nine of 14 congressional districts.

District	Warnock	Walker	Representative
1st	44%	56%	Buddy Carter
2nd	56%	44%	Sanford Bishop
3rd	36%	64%	Drew Ferguson
4th	82%	18%	Hank Johnson
5th	87%	13%	Nikema Williams
6th	44%	56%	Lucy McBath (117th Congress)
6th	44%	56%	Rich McCormick (118th Congress)
7th	66%	34%	Carolyn Bourdeaux (117th Congress)
7th	66%	34%	Lucy McBath (118th Congress)
8th	35%	65%	Austin Scott
9th	31%	69%	Andrew Clyde
10th	39%	61%	Jody Hice (117th Congress)
10th	39%	61%	Mike Collins (118th Congress)
11th	43%	57%	Barry Loudermilk
12th	44%	56%	Rick Allen
13th	84%	16%	David Scott
14th	32%	68%	Marjorie Taylor Greene

== See also ==
- 2022 Georgia gubernatorial election
- 2022 United States House of Representatives elections in Georgia
- 2022 United States Senate elections
- 2022 Georgia state elections

== Notes ==
Partisan clients
