= Georgia's 12th congressional district =

U.S. House district for Georgia

Coordinates: 32°54′42.75″N 82°19′14″W

- Interactive map of district boundaries since January 3, 2023
- Representative: Rick Allen; R–Augusta
- Distribution: 59.96% urban; 40.04% rural
- Population (2025): 792,390
- Median household income: $65,253
- Ethnicity: 52.1% White; 36.1% Black; 5.6% Hispanic; 3.6% Two or more races; 1.8% Asian; 0.7% other
- Cook PVI: R+7

Georgia's 12th congressional district is a congressional district in the U.S. state of Georgia. It is represented by Republican Rick Allen. The district's boundaries have been redrawn following the 2010 census, which granted an additional congressional seat to Georgia. The first election using the new district boundaries (listed below) were the 2012 congressional elections.

The district covers portions of the eastern and southeastern parts of the state. It includes the cities of Augusta, Dublin, and Statesboro.

== Counties and communities ==
For the 119th and successive Congresses (based on the districts drawn following a 2023 court order), the district contains all or portions of the following counties and communities.

Bulloch County (4)

All four communities

Burke County (7)

All seven communities

Candler County (2)

Metter, Pulaski

Columbia County (5)

All five communities

Effingham County (2)

Guyton (part; also 1st), Springfield (part; also 1st)

Emanuel County (10)

All ten communities

Evans County (4)

All four communities

Glascock County (3)

All three communities

Jefferson County (7)

All seven communities

Jenkins County (2)

Millen, Perkins

Johnson County (3)

All three communities

Laurens County (8)

All eight communities

Lincoln County (1)

Lincolnton

McDuffie County (2)

Dearing, Thomson

Montgomery County (7)

All seven communities

Richmond County (3)

All three communities

Screven County (5)

All five communities

Tattnall County (6)

All six communities

Toombs County (4)

All four communities

Treutlen County (1)

Soperton

Warren County (3)

All three communities

Washington County (8)

All eight communities

Wheeler County (3)

All three communities

Wilkes County (1)

Washington

== Recent election results from statewide races ==
Year	Office	Results
2008	President	McCain 54% - 45%
2012	President	Romney 55% - 45%
2016	President	Trump 55% - 42%
2016	Senate	Isakson 59% - 38%
2018	Governor	Kemp 56% - 43%
2018	Lt. Governor	Duncan 58% - 42%
2018	Attorney General	Carr 57% - 43%
2020	President	Trump 54% - 44%
2021	Senate (Reg.)	Perdue 55% - 45%
2021	Senate (Spec.)	Loeffler 55% - 45%
2022	Senate	Walker 56% - 44%
2022	Governor	Kemp 59% - 40%
2022	Lt. Governor	Jones 58% - 40%
2022	Secretary of State	Raffensperger 59% - 38%
2022	Attorney General	Carr 58% - 41%
2024	President	Trump 57% - 43%

== List of members representing the district ==
Member	Party	Years	Cong ress	Electoral history	District location
District established March 4, 1913
Dudley M. Hughes (Danville)	Democratic	March 4, 1913 – March 3, 1917	63rd 64th	Redistricted from the 3rd district and re-elected in 1912. Re-elected in 1914. Lost renomination.	1913 – 1933 [data missing]
William W. Larsen (Dublin)	Democratic	March 4, 1917 – March 3, 1933	65th 66th 67th 68th 69th 70th 71st 72nd	Elected in 1916. Re-elected in 1918. Re-elected in 1920. Re-elected in 1922. Re-elected in 1924. Re-elected in 1926. Re-elected in 1928. Re-elected in 1930. Retired.	1913 – 1933 [data missing]
District eliminated March 3, 1933
District re-established January 3, 2003
Max Burns (Sylvania)	Republican	January 3, 2003 – January 3, 2005	108th	Elected in 2002. Lost re-election.	2003 – 2007 Bulloch, Burke, Clarke, Effingham, Glascock, Jefferson, Jenkins, Screven, Taliaferro, and Warren counties and parts of Bryan, Chatham, Oglethorpe, and Richmond counties.
John Barrow (Savannah)	Democratic	January 3, 2005 – January 3, 2015	109th 110th 111th 112th 113th	Elected in 2004. Re-elected in 2006. Re-elected in 2008. Re-elected in 2010. Re-elected in 2012. Lost re-election.	2003 – 2007 Bulloch, Burke, Clarke, Effingham, Glascock, Jefferson, Jenkins, Screven, Taliaferro, and Warren counties and parts of Bryan, Chatham, Oglethorpe, and Richmond counties.
John Barrow (Savannah)	Democratic	January 3, 2005 – January 3, 2015	109th 110th 111th 112th 113th	Elected in 2004. Re-elected in 2006. Re-elected in 2008. Re-elected in 2010. Re-elected in 2012. Lost re-election.	2007 – 2013 Bulloch, Burke, Candler, Effingham, Emanuel, Evans, Glascock, Hancock, Jefferson, Jenkins, Johnson, Montgomery, Screven, Taliaferro, Tattnall, Toombs, Treutlen, Warren, and Washington counties and parts of Baldwin, Chatham, and Richmond counties.
John Barrow (Savannah)	Democratic	January 3, 2005 – January 3, 2015	109th 110th 111th 112th 113th	Elected in 2004. Re-elected in 2006. Re-elected in 2008. Re-elected in 2010. Re-elected in 2012. Lost re-election.	2013–2023 Appling, Bulloch, Burke, Candler, Coffee, Emanuel, Evans, Jeff Davis, Jenkins, Laurens, Montgomery, Richmond, Screven, Tattnall, Toombs, Treutlen, and Wheeler counties and parts of Columbia and Effingham counties.
Rick Allen (Augusta)	Republican	January 3, 2015 – present	114th 115th 116th 117th 118th 119th	Elected in 2014. Re-elected in 2016. Re-elected in 2018. Re-elected in 2020. Re-elected in 2022. Re-elected in 2024. Re-elected in 2026.	2013–2023 Appling, Bulloch, Burke, Candler, Coffee, Emanuel, Evans, Jeff Davis, Jenkins, Laurens, Montgomery, Richmond, Screven, Tattnall, Toombs, Treutlen, and Wheeler counties and parts of Columbia and Effingham counties.
Rick Allen (Augusta)	Republican	January 3, 2015 – present	114th 115th 116th 117th 118th 119th	Elected in 2014. Re-elected in 2016. Re-elected in 2018. Re-elected in 2020. Re-elected in 2022. Re-elected in 2024. Re-elected in 2026.	2023–2025
Rick Allen (Augusta)	Republican	January 3, 2015 – present	114th 115th 116th 117th 118th 119th	Elected in 2014. Re-elected in 2016. Re-elected in 2018. Re-elected in 2020. Re-elected in 2022. Re-elected in 2024. Re-elected in 2026.	2025–present

== Election results ==
=== 2012 ===
Georgia's 12th Congressional District Election (2012)
Party	Candidate	Votes	%
Democratic	John Barrow (Incumbent)	139,148	53.70
Republican	Lee Anderson	119,973	46.30
Total votes		259,121	100.00
Democratic hold			

=== 2014 ===
Georgia's 12th congressional district election, 2014
Party	Candidate	Votes	%
Republican	Rick Allen	91,336	54.7
Democratic	John Barrow (incumbent)	75,478	45.3
Total votes		166,814	100.0
Republican gain from Democratic			

=== 2016 ===
Georgia's 12th congressional district, 2016
Party	Candidate	Votes	%
Republican	Rick Allen (incumbent)	159,492	61.6
Democratic	Patricia C. McCracken	99,420	38.4
Total votes		258,912	100.0
Republican hold			

=== 2018 ===
Georgia's 12th congressional district, 2018
Party	Candidate	Votes	%
Republican	Rick W. Allen (incumbent)	148,986	59.5
Democratic	Francys Johnson	101,503	40.5
Total votes		250,489	100.0
Republican hold			

=== 2020 ===
Georgia's 12th congressional district, 2020
Party	Candidate	Votes	%
Republican	Rick W. Allen (incumbent)	181,038	58.4
Democratic	Elizabeth Johnson	129,061	41.6
Total votes		309,544	100.0
Republican hold			

=== 2022 ===
Georgia's 12th congressional district, 2022
Party	Candidate	Votes	%
Republican	Rick W. Allen (incumbent)	158,047	59.6
Democratic	Elizabeth Johnson	107,148	40.4
Total votes		265,195	100.0
Republican hold			

=== 2024 ===
Georgia's 12th congressional district, 2024
Party	Candidate	Votes	%
Republican	Rick W. Allen (incumbent)	205,849	60.32
Democratic	Elizabeth Johnson	135,417	39.68
Total votes		341,266	100.0
Republican hold			

== See also ==
- Georgia's 3rd congressional district
- Georgia's congressional districts
