= 2022 Georgia Attorney General election =

- November 8, 2022
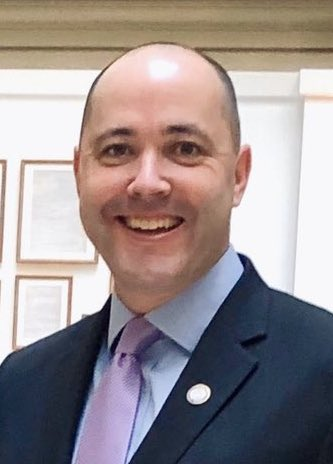

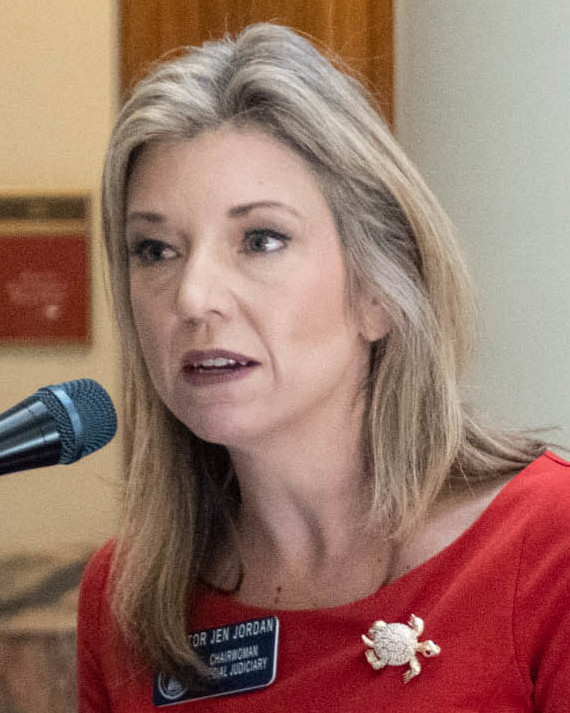
Candidate	Chris Carr	Jen Jordan
Party	Republican	Democratic
Popular vote	2,032,500	1,826,437
Percentage	51.86%	46.60%
- Carr: 40–50% 50–60% 60–70% 70–80% 80–90% >90% Jordan: 40–50% 50–60% 60–70% 70–80% 80–90% >90% No data
Attorney General before election
Chris Carr
Republican
Elected Attorney General
Chris Carr
Republican

The 2022 Georgia Attorney General election was held on November 8, 2022, to elect the Attorney General of Georgia. Incumbent Republican attorney general Christopher M. Carr was appointed to the office on November 1, 2016, following the resignation of Sam Olens to become the president of Kennesaw State University. Carr won a second full term in office over state senator Jen Jordan by a margin of 5.3%.

== Republican primary ==
Incumbent Republican Georgia Attorney General Chris Carr faced criticism from former president Donald Trump and other Republican officials for his refusal to pursuit a lawsuit over the disputed results of the 2020 United States presidential election in Georgia. He was faced in the primary by businessman John Gordon, who Trump subsequently endorsed.

=== Candidates ===
==== Nominee ====
- Chris Carr, incumbent attorney general

==== Eliminated in primary ====
- John Gordon, businessman and lawyer

=== Endorsements ===
John Gordon

U.S. Executive Branch officials

- Donald Trump, 45th President of the United States (2017–2021)

=== Polling ===
Poll source	Date(s) administered	Sample size (Note: Key: A – all adults RV – registered voters LV – likely voters V – unclear)	Margin of error	Chris Carr	John Gordon	Undecided
Landmark Communications	May 22, 2022	500 (LV)	± 4.4%	49%	24%	27%
ARW Strategies (R)	April 30 – May 1, 2022	600 (LV)	± 4.0%	25%	9%	66%
Landmark Communications	April 9–10, 2022	660 (LV)	± 3.8%	32%	17%	52%

=== Results ===
Results by county Carr: 50–60% 60–70% 70–80% 80–90%

Republican primary results
Party	Candidate	Votes	%
Republican	Chris Carr (incumbent)	834,383	73.75%
Republican	John Gordon	297,037	26.25%
Total votes		1,131,420	100.0%

== Democratic primary ==
=== Candidates ===
==== Nominee ====
- Jen Jordan, state senator from the 6th district

==== Eliminated in primary ====
- Christian Wise Smith, lawyer

==== Withdrawn ====
- Charlie Bailey, former Fulton County senior assistant district attorney and nominee for Attorney General in 2018 (running for Lieutenant Governor)

=== Endorsements ===
Jen Jordan

Organizations

- EMILY's List
- End Citizens United
- Giffords
- NARAL Pro-Choice America

=== Results ===
Democratic primary results
Party	Candidate	Votes	%
Democratic	Jen Jordan	533,266	77.60%
Democratic	Christian Wise Smith	153,928	22.40%
Total votes		687,194	100.0%

== Libertarian primary ==
=== Candidates ===
==== Declared ====
- Martin Cowen, former Clayton County probate judge

== General election ==
=== Predictions ===
Source	Ranking	As of
Sabato's Crystal Ball	Lean R	November 3, 2022
Elections Daily	Likely R	November 1, 2022

=== Post-primary endorsements ===
Jen Jordan (D)

U.S. senators

- Jon Ossoff, Georgia (2021–present)

Organizations

- Georgia Equality
- Human Rights Campaign

=== Polling ===
Graphical summary

Poll source	Date(s) administered	Sample size	Margin of error	Chris Carr (R)	Jen Jordan (D)	Other	Undecided
Landmark Communications	November 4–7, 2022	1,214 (LV)	± 2.8%	47%	43%	6% (Note: Cowen with 6%)	4%
The Trafalgar Group (R)	November 4–6, 2022	1,103 (LV)	± 2.9%	51%	42%	3% (Note: Cowen with 3%)	3%
The Trafalgar Group (R)	October 8–11, 2022	1,084 (LV)	± 2.9%	46%	37%	4% (Note: Cowen with 4%)	13%
SurveyUSA	September 30 – October 4, 2022	1,076 (LV)	± 3.7%	40%	36%	4%	20%
University of Georgia	September 5–16, 2022	861 (LV)	± 3.3%	45%	35%	5%	16%
The Trafalgar Group (R)	August 24–27, 2022	1,079 (LV)	± 2.9%	48%	40%	4%	8%
SurveyUSA	July 21–24, 2022	604 (LV)	± 5.3%	38%	34%	4%	24%

=== Results ===
2022 Georgia Attorney General election
Party	Candidate	Votes	%	±%
Republican	Chris Carr (incumbent)	2,032,500	51.86%	+0.56%
Democratic	Jen Jordan	1,826,437	46.60%	−2.10%
Libertarian	Martin Cowen	60,107	1.53%	N/A
Total votes		3,919,044	100.0%	
Republican hold				

==== By congressional district ====
Carr won nine of 14 congressional districts.

District	Carr	Jordan	Representative
1st	59%	40%	Buddy Carter
2nd	47%	52%	Sanford Bishop
3rd	67%	32%	Drew Ferguson
4th	22%	77%	Hank Johnson
5th	18%	81%	Nikema Williams
6th	61%	37%	Lucy McBath (117th Congress)
6th	61%	37%	Rich McCormick (118th Congress)
7th	39%	59%	Carolyn Bourdeaux (117th Congress)
7th	39%	59%	Lucy McBath (118th Congress)
8th	67%	32%	Austin Scott
9th	72%	27%	Andrew Clyde
10th	63%	35%	Jody Hice (117th Congress)
10th	63%	35%	Mike Collins (118th Congress)
11th	60%	38%	Barry Loudermilk
12th	58%	41%	Rick Allen
13th	19%	80%	David Scott
14th	70%	29%	Marjorie Taylor Greene

== See also ==
- 2022 Georgia state elections
