= Chris Carr (politician) =

American lawyer and politician (born 1972)

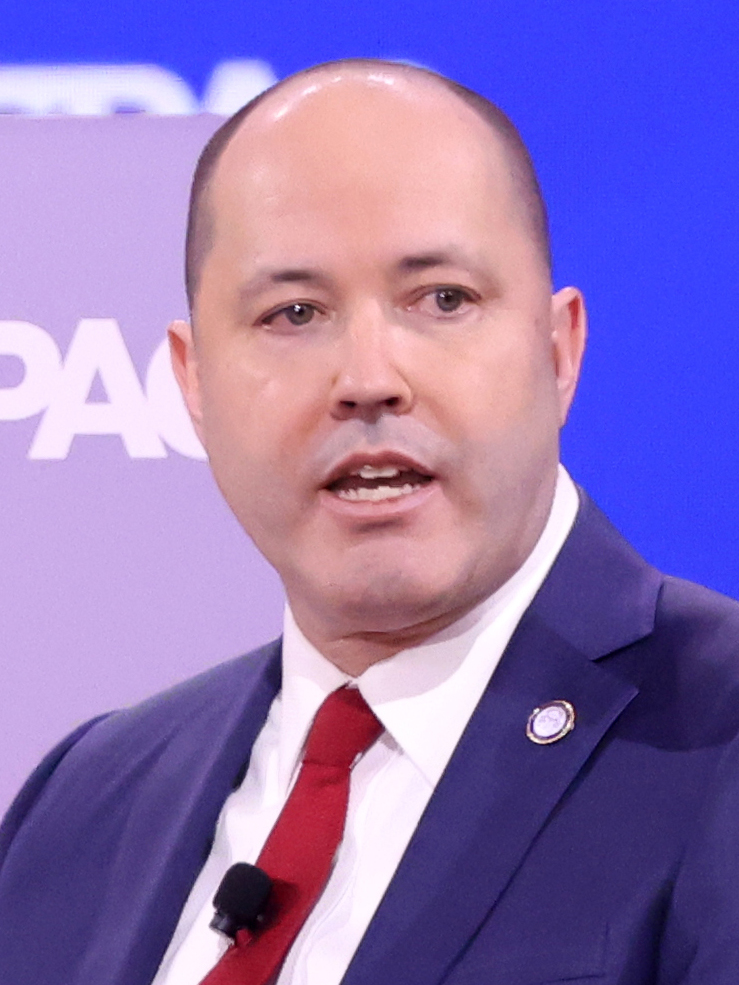
- Carr in 2025

48th Attorney General of Georgia
- Incumbent
- Assumed office November 1, 2016
- Governor: Nathan Deal; Brian Kemp
- Preceded by: Sam Olens

Commissioner of the Georgia Department of Economic Development
- In office November 2013 – November 2016
- Governor: Nathan Deal
- Preceded by: Chris Cummiskey
- Succeeded by: Pat Wilson

Personal details
- Born: Christopher Michael Carr; February 8, 1972 (age 54) Lansing, Michigan, U.S.
- Party: Republican
- Spouse: Joan Carr
- Children: 2
- Education: University of Georgia (BBA, JD)
- Website: Campaign website
- Carr's voice Carr on human trafficking in Georgia. Recorded January 31, 2020

Christopher Michael Carr (born February 8, 1972) is an American lawyer and politician who has served as the 48th attorney general of Georgia since 2016. A member of the Republican Party, he unsuccessfully sought its nomination in the 2026 Georgia gubernatorial election.

In 2016, Carr was appointed Attorney General by Governor Nathan Deal as Attorney General to succeed Sam Olens. He was elected to a full term in 2018. In 2020, he faced criticism from Donald Trump and other Republican officials for his refusal to pursue a lawsuit over the disputed results of the 2020 United States presidential election in Georgia. Carr was re-elected in 2022 after defeating a Trump-endorsed primary challenger.

== Education ==
Carr grew up in the Atlanta suburb of Dunwoody and graduated from Marist School in 1990. He then graduated from the University of Georgia Terry College of Business with a BBA degree in 1995, and from the University of Georgia School of Law with a Juris Doctor degree in 1999. Carr has been admitted to practice law in Georgia since 1999.

== Legal career ==
After graduating law school, he practiced law with Alston & Bird in Atlanta and later served as vice president and general counsel for the Georgia Public Policy Foundation, a free market think tank. From 2011 to 2018 he served on the Georgia Judicial Nominating Commission. He also served on the Board of Advisors for the Atlanta Lawyers Chapter of the Federalist Society for Law and Public Policy Studies.

== Political career ==
Carr was chief of staff for U.S. senator Johnny Isakson for six years. Carr returned from D.C. to serve as Governor Nathan Deal's commissioner of the Georgia Department of Economic Development from November 2013 to November 2016.

=== Attorney General of Georgia ===
On November 1, 2016, Carr was appointed by Governor Nathan Deal and sworn into office the 54th Attorney General of Georgia when Sam Olens resigned to become President of Kennesaw State University.

In 2019, Carr joined 17 other Republican attorneys general in suing to invalidate the Affordable Care Act (ACA), stating, "We believe the Court will uphold our position that the ACA is unconstitutional."

In 2020, he faced criticism from former president Donald Trump and other Republican officials for his refusal to pursue a lawsuit over the disputed results of the 2020 United States presidential election in Georgia. In 2022, Carr faced a primary challenge by businessman John Gordon, who Trump subsequently endorsed. Carr won the primary with approximately 74% of the vote.

During his tenure, Carr's office was involved in indicting a former member of Georgia's Board of Regents for racketeering. His office also indicted the Paulding County, Georgia, District Attorney for bribery and a former chief magistrate judge in Pickens County, Georgia, for financial fraud. His office also oversaw indictments of three individuals for elder abuse.

As Attorney General, Carr has defended Georgia law that bans abortion beyond six weeks of pregnancy amid court challenges to restore abortion rights in Georgia.

In February 2026, Carr launched an investigation into Roblox following instances and reports of child exploitation.

==== Resignation from Republican Attorneys General Association ====
Carr was chair of the Republican Attorneys General Association, an organization that sent robocalls on January 6, 2021, urging supporters to march to Washington to dispute the certification of the election results in which Joe Biden won. Carr resigned as chair of the organization in April 2021 over his opposition to the robocall, saying he had a "fundamental difference of opinion" with others in the organization that began with "vastly opposite views of the significance of the events of January 6."

=== 2026 gubernatorial election ===
On November 21, 2024, Carr announced his candidacy for Governor of Georgia in the 2026 Georgia gubernatorial election.

Carr placed fourth in the primary election. He endorsed Rick Jackson in the primary runoff.

== Personal life ==
Chris Carr is married to Joan Carr. They have two daughters.

== Electoral history ==
Georgia Attorney General election, 2018
Party	Candidate	Votes	%
Republican	Chris Carr (incumbent)	1,981,563	51.3
Democratic	Charlie Bailey	1,880,807	48.7

Georgia Attorney General Republican primary, 2022
Party	Candidate	Votes	%
Republican	Chris Carr (incumbent)	281,708	74.2
Republican	John Gordon	98,081	25.8

Georgia Attorney General election, 2022
Party	Candidate	Votes	%
Republican	Chris Carr (incumbent)	2,030,300	51.9
Democratic	Jen Jordan	1,822,552	46.6
Libertarian	Martin Cowen	59,942	1.53

Party political offices
Preceded by Sam Olens	Republican nominee for Attorney General of Georgia; 2018, 2022	Succeeded by Brian Strickland
Legal offices
Preceded by Sam Olens	Attorney General of Georgia; 2016–present	Incumbent
