= Rick Allen (politician) =

American politician (born 1951)

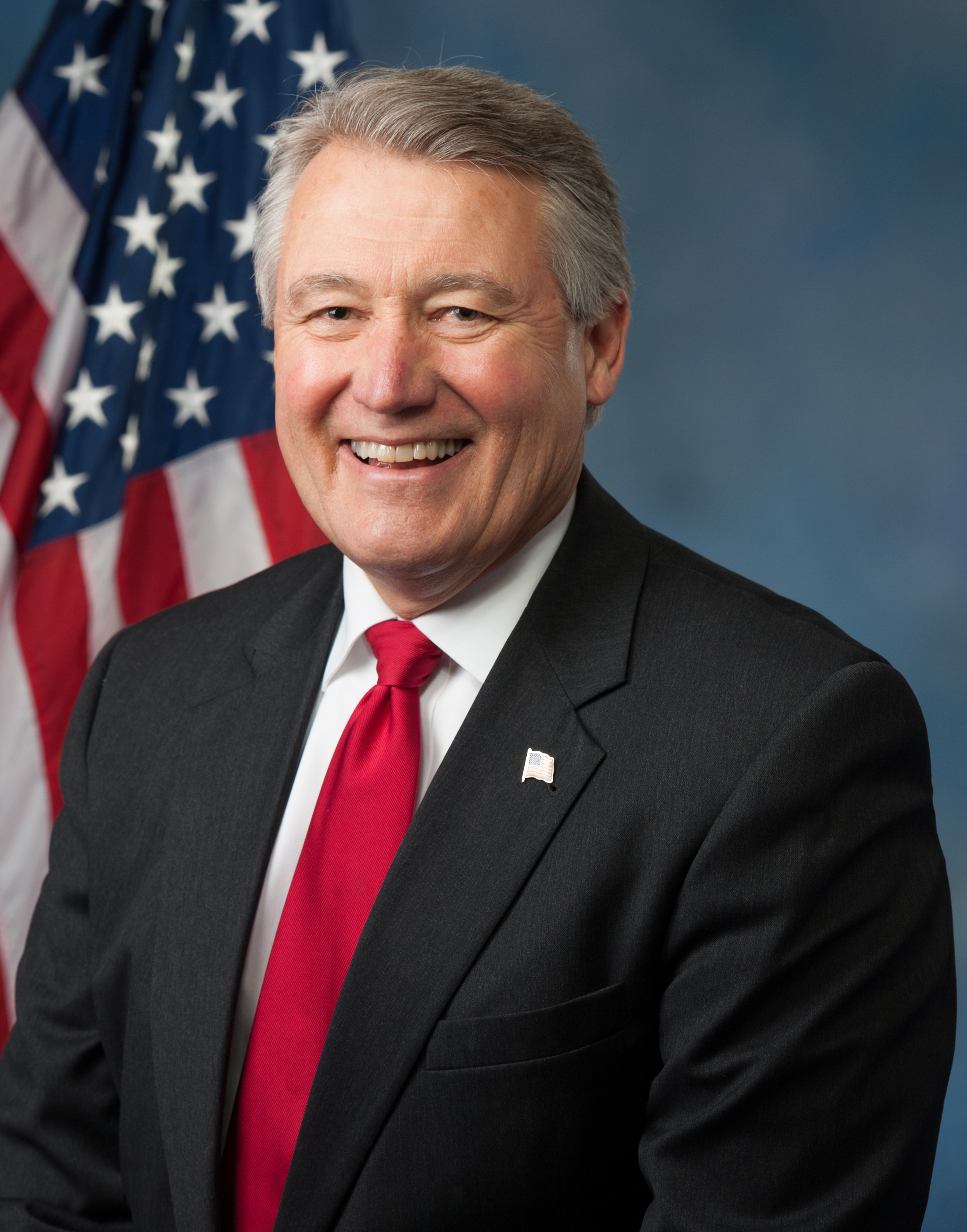
- Official portrait, 2015

Member of the U.S. House of Representatives from Georgia's 12th district
- Incumbent
- Assumed office January 3, 2015
- Preceded by: John Barrow

Personal details
- Born: Richard Wayne Allen; November 7, 1951 (age 75) Augusta, Georgia, U.S.
- Party: Republican
- Spouse: Robin Reeve
- Children: 4
- Education: Auburn University (BS)
- Website: House website Campaign website
- Allen's voice Allen on the birth of his thirteenth grandchild. Recorded December 12, 2018

Richard Wayne Allen (born November 7, 1951) is an American politician and businessman who has served as the Republican Party's U.S. representative for Georgia's 12th congressional district since 2015. Georgia's 12th district is in East Central Georgia and favors Republicans by seven points according to the 2025 Cook Partisan Voting Index. Allen began his career as a project manager after graduating from Auburn in 1973 with a degree in building construction. In 1976, he founded a construction company.

Allen is one of the more wealthy US Congress members and spent almost a million dollars of his own money on the 2014 Republican primary, which he won. The 2014 general election between Allen and the incumbent John Barrow drew national attention and funding. Barrow had represented Georgia's 12th district since 2005 and was the last remaining Blue Dog Democrat in the deep south. The district was more Republican-favoring after a redistricting, and Allen defeated Barrow with 54.7% of the vote. From 2016 to 2024, Allen was re-elected to successive biennial terms with about 60% of the vote. In the 2026 election, he won with 52.1% of the vote.

Allen is a Methodist who has attracted scrutiny for his interpretation and inaccurate quoting of Genesis 12:3 during a congressional hearing about pro-Palestinian protests at Columbia University. Using his version of Genesis 12:3, he asked the university president if she wanted Columbia to be "cursed by God." As a freshman lawmaker, Allen drew media attention and disgust from some Republicans when he communicated to them that supporting an anti-discrimination provision for LGBT individuals was against Christian principles.

On January 6, 2021, he was one of the 139 Republican House members who objected to certifying Biden as president. Days after the January 6 United States Capitol attack, in comments to the chief of staff of the Trump administration, he stated Trump was being used by God in spiritual warfare. Allen has supported the "Muslim ban", the 2017 Trump tax cuts, and the One Big Beautiful Bill Act. He does not make a practice of holding town halls; instead, he uses over-the-telephone "town halls."

== Career ==
Allen attended Auburn University and graduated in 1973 with a Bachelor of Science in building construction. He worked for three years as a project manager for a builder before founding R.W. Allen and Associates in 1976. The business is an Augusta-based construction company. It has operations also in Athens. According to a spokesperson, Allen gave up his "majority stake years before becoming a lawmaker."

== U.S. House of Representatives ==
=== Georgia's 12 district ===
Georgia's 12th congressional district favors Republicans by seven points according to the 2025 Cook Partisan Voting Index. It is located in East Central Georgia and includes the cities of Augusta, Statesboro, and Vidalia among many others.

=== Campaigns ===
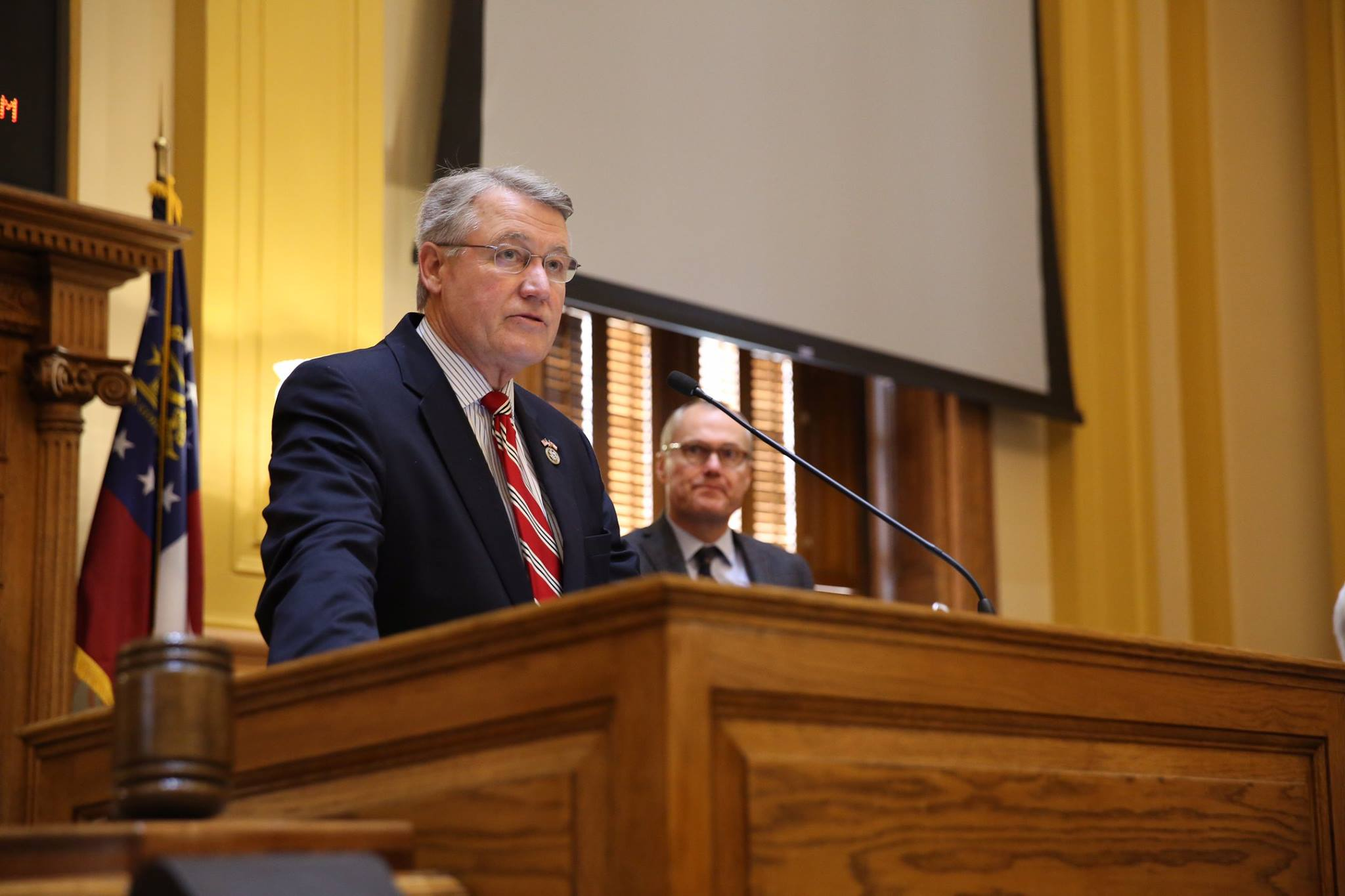
Allen speaking to the Georgia State Senate in 2017

In 2012, Allen ran in the Republican primary for the 12th district against three other candidates. He advanced to the runoff, but lost to state representative Lee Anderson, 49.7% to 50.3%. Anderson went on to lose the general election to the incumbent and Democrat John Barrow.

In 2013, Allen was the leading Republican challenging Barrow but was having fundraising challenges. In 2014, Allen spent "nearly a million dollars of his own money" and won a "five-way primary with 54% of the vote," thus making it to the general election. In the general, he defeated the incumbent Blue Dog Democrat (Note: The Economist ran a story before the election about Barrow titled "The loneliest man in Congress: Will 2014 spell doom for the last white House Democrat in the Deep South?") Barrow with 54.7% of the vote, a result considered an upset by The Atlanta Journal-Constitution even though the 12th district had been made significantly more Republican by redistricting. Barrow was "Georgia’s only remaining white Democrat in the House." Allen's race was well funded by Republicans, with almost a million coming from the conservative American Future Fund, which was partially sponsored by the Koch brothers. The Almanac summarized the financing of the election by writing that "Barrow outspent Allen $3.5 million to $2.5 million, but the nearly $4 million in national GOP assistance more than made up the difference."

In 2016, Allen was reelected with 61.6% of the vote. He ran against the Democratic candidate Tricia Carpenter McCracken.

In 2018, Allen was reelected with 59.5% of the vote. He ran against the Democratic candidate—a lawyer and pastor—Francys Johnson.

In 2020, Allen was reelected with 58.4% of the vote. He ran against the Democratic candidate Elizabeth Johnson.

In 2022, Allen was endorsed by Trump in the primary, which he won as the incumbent. Allen was reelected with 59.6% of the vote. He ran against the Democratic candidate Elizabeth Johnson.

In 2024, Allen was reelected with 60.3% of the vote. He ran against the Democratic candidate Elizabeth Johnson.

In 2026, Allen was reelected with 52% of the vote. He ran against Democratic candidate Ceretta Smith.

=== Committee assignments ===
For the 118th Congress:

- Committee on Education and the Workforce
  - Subcommittee on Health, Employment, Labor, and Pensions
- Committee on Energy and Commerce
  - Subcommittee on Communications and Technology
  - Subcommittee on Environment, Manufacturing, and Critical Minerals
  - Subcommittee on Innovation, Data, and Commerce

=== Caucuses ===
- Republican Study Committee
- Congressional Taiwan Caucus

=== Tenure ===
In 2017, Allen was one of the Republican supporters of Executive Order 13769, also known as the "Muslim ban." In 2019, Allen was one of 34 House Republicans to vote with Democrats for a disaster relief bill that Trump opposed. In 2022, Allen voted against a bill that passed the House by 350–69. The bill directed the National Science Foundation to award merit-based grants to study "the disruption of regular cognitive processes associated with both short-term and long-term COVID-19 infections."

Allen opposed the 2023 hardline GOP efforts to oust Kevin McCarthy as speaker of the House, which were led by Matt Gaetz. Allen's former legislative director, Katie Mercer, was reported to be working as a lobbyist for Walmart in 2023. Allen has been a supporter of construction at a MOX fuel facility in South Carolina, the Mixed Oxide Fuel Fabrication Facility. He has an "F" rating from the National Organization for the Reform of Marijuana Laws for his opposition to cannabis-related causes, including medical marijuana.

In 2025, Allen voted for the One Big Beautiful Bill Act.

==== Economy ====
In 2017, Allen voted in favor of the Tax Cuts and Jobs Act, also known as the Trump tax cuts. In 2022, Allen introduced legislation to expand the 2014 Workforce Innovation and Opportunity Act so that entrepreneurs would have access to the same resources as job seekers. Allen has proposed legislation to stymie environmental, social, and governance investing. In the second Trump administration, Allen supported a spending freeze from the Inflation Reduction Act despite $1.6 billion of private investment in his district associated with the law's passage. In so doing, "Allen claimed without evidence that the Biden administration had doled out money improperly." In 2025, Allen spoke approvingly of ending the carried interest loophole.

In response to the 2022 United States infant formula shortage, Allen was initially one of 2 Republicans to vote against the Formula Act, which passed the House in a 421–2 vote and would "temporarily suspend tariffs on baby formula imports." However, hours later, Allen said he mistakenly made the "no" vote and filed paperwork to change his vote.

==== 2020 presidential election results ====
Given the refusal to accept the 2020 election loss of Donald Trump by allies and supporters, Allen voted to reject the results in both Arizona and Pennsylvania immediately after the January 6th Capitol attack. He was one of 139 Republican House members who "heeded President Trump's calls" to object against certifying Biden as president.

Allen was one of 126 Republican members of the House of Representatives to sign an amicus brief in support of Texas v. Pennsylvania, a lawsuit filed at the United States Supreme Court that was aimed to prevent the electors of four states, including Georgia, from casting votes for Biden. The Supreme Court declined to hear the case on the basis that Texas lacked standing.

===== After the January 6th Capitol attack =====
Allen sent the following text message to then White House Chief of Staff Mark Meadows on January 8, 2021:

“Mark, please know that I have prayed for President Trump, his family, for you and the entire Administration. Our Nation is at war, it is a Spiritual War at the highest level. This is not a war that can be fought conventionally, this is God’s battle and He has used President Trump in a powerful way to expose the deceit, lies and hypocrisy of the enemy. The Trump family and all of us have paid a heavy price to be used by the Father but the War is just beginning. We have had a major set back and people are taking sides, and my plea to my fellow believers who want to cut and run is judge not less you be judged, we have all fallen short of the Glory of Almighty God. What I heard during my prayers is the Trump family and the Administration need to be surrounded by those great Pastors and Evangelicals who have and continue to love and support them. President Trump needs to be ministered to, he needs the love that only Jesus Christ offers! This is his opportunity to confess that he can no longer fight this battle alone, he must give it to Christ and God almighty will show him the way to victory. I will continue to pray for all of you, please let me know how I can help??”

==== LGBT rights ====
In 2015, Allen cosponsored a resolution to amend the Constitution to ban same-sex marriage. Allen also cosponsored an amendment disagreeing with the Supreme Court ruling in Obergefell v. Hodges, which held that same-sex marriage bans violated the constitution.

During a 2016 closed-door Republican meeting the morning after an amendment (Note: "The LGBT provision, proposed by Democratic Rep. Sean Patrick Maloney of New York, would have implemented a 2014 executive order that prohibits federal contractors from discriminating by sexual orientation or gender identity" according to the Lexington Herald-Leader. The amendment was to "reinforce" the executive order, according to Roll Call. To gain Republican support, "Rep. Sean Patrick Maloney (D-N.Y.) allowed Rep. Joe Pitts (R-Pa.) to add a line allowing for exceptions as 'required by the First Amendment, the Fourteenth Amendment, and Article I of the Constitution.' ") that prohibited discrimination against LGBT workers had passed the House 223 to 195, Allen, a freshman Republican, "went after dozens of fellow Republicans." He led the beginning, devotional portion of the meeting and according to his press secretary read Romans 1:18–32 and Revelations 22:18–19. A verse he read says of homosexuals, "they which commit such things are worthy of death." According to The New Civil Rights Movement, he told the assembled Republicans that they were "going to Hell" if they voted for the amendment. According to The Hill, Allen suggested supporting the provision was "defying Christian tenets." Politico reported a Republican said the comments meant "nothing good was going to happen to those that supported [the LGBT provision]." Moderate Republicans were described as "stunned." Several Republicans walked out, disgusted by the comments. "A good number" were described as furious. One GOP lawmaker who supported the provision said, "It was f—ing ridiculous" and a leadership aide said, "a lot of members were clearly uncomfortable and upset." An aide of Allen said that he "did not mention the upcoming vote on the Energy-Water spending bill or [the] amendment." Later that day, GOP House members voted in the majority against the Energy-Water spending bill that included the amendment. The bill failed in a 305–112 vote, with some Democrats also voting against the bill for various reasons.

After the 2016 Orlando nightclub shooting, Allen offered prayers to the families of the victims but did not apologize or retract his past comments. In 2022, Allen voted against H.R.8404—the Respect for Marriage Act—which would codify same-sex and interracial marriages. In October 2023, Allen said he could not support Speaker of the House candidate Tom Emmer on the grounds that Emmer had previously supported a bill that would offer the same federal protections to same-sex couples as heterosexual couples.

==== Foreign policy ====
In response to the 2017–2018 North Korea crisis, Allen reassured a group of Republican constituents that "Defense Secretary Jim Mattis, Secretary of State Rex W. Tillerson and Gen. Joseph F. Dunford Jr., the chairman of the Joint Chiefs of Staff, knew 'exactly what to do.' "

In 2019, Allen was one of 60 representatives to vote against condemning President Trump's withdrawal from Syria.

In 2020, Allen voted against the National Defense Authorization Act of 2021, which would prevent the president from withdrawing soldiers from Afghanistan without congressional approval.

In light of Russia's invasion, Allen initially supported Ukraine. In September 2023, Allen "voted against a security assistance bill ... becoming one of dozens of lawmakers" who had withdrawn some of their support for the "embattled nation."

===== Israel and Palestine =====
Allen considers Jerusalem the "center of the universe." In a 410 to 12 vote, he voted to provide Israel with support following the 2023 Hamas attack. In the context of the Gaza War, a prior 2023 hearing on antisemitism, and pro-Palestinian campus protests at Columbia and elsewhere, Allen addressed Columbia leaders including then president Nemat Shafik during a 2024 hearing. (Note: The title of the hearing was "Columbia University's Response to Antisemitism.") According to Michelle Goldberg of The New York Times, his questioning was an example of Republicans wanting to silence Israel's critics. Goldberg wrote that

In one of the hearing’s most farcical moments, Rick Allen ... asked Shafik whether she knew Genesis 12:3. She didn’t recall the biblical passage offhand, so he explained it to her. “It was the covenant that God made with Abraham, and that covenant was real clear: ‘If you bless Israel I will bless you, if you curse Israel I will curse you,’ ” he said, explaining how this compact was confirmed in the New Testament. “Do you consider that a serious issue?” Allen asked heatedly. “Do you want Columbia University to be cursed by God?” Shafik responded, “Definitely not.” Allen continued, “Young people are being indoctrinated by these professors to believe this stuff, and they have no idea that they’re going to be cursed by God, the God of the Bible and the God over our flag.”

Allen also mentioned " 'lawless universities' and suggested the school should offer a course about the Bible and 'kinda what will happen under the wrath of God.' " Andrew Marantz in The New Yorker cited a student who said, "the Bible is in our core curriculum!" and "did this man even Google us?" Marantz wrote that Allen "loosely quoted Genesis 12:3." Authors writing in NACLA Report on the Americas commented that Genesis 12:3, "in which God speaks to Abraham, does not in fact mention Israel." They wrote that Allen's "widely commented words" reflected a "contemporary Christian Zionist worldview."

Chance Bonar, writing in Religion Dispatches, interpreted the exchange between Allen and Shafik as thus:

Allen’s statement and Shafik’s response exemplify the abysmal state of religious literacy in the United States, even as biblical texts and religious identities are at the center of current debates over US–Israel policy and campus protest culture. Allen egregiously misquotes Genesis 12:3 by retrojecting “Israel”—a name given to Jacob later on in Genesis 32:28—into the story of God’s call to Abram and promise to make him into a great nation.

In doing so, Allen extends Genesis 12 from a blessing or curse on a single person, Abram, to a covenant that affects all of his descendants and specifically applies to the modern nation-state of Israel. Shafik, on the other hand, like other university presidents who’ve testified before Congress on campus antisemitism, erred when she accepted the premise and validity of the question. The use of (poor) biblical interpretation to justify Congressional investigation into university policies should strike us as odd.

==== Healthcare ====
Along with 204 other Republicans in the House, Allen voted against the Mental Health Matters Act of 2022, "a bill that aimed to make mental health care in schools more accessible." Allen "expressed his discontent with the bill saying that 'This bill will only benefit trial lawyers and will lead to a reduction in mental health benefits as employers will have to divert money to pay attorneys' fees."

==== Apparent STOCK act violations ====
In September 2021, an analysis by Business Insider found that Allen appeared to have violated the Stop Trading on Congressional Knowledge Act of 2012, or STOCK Act, by failing to list on his 2020 financial disclosure form stock holdings in seven companies, worth up to $140,000, that appeared on his 2019 annual financial disclosure form, as well as being about 15 months late in reporting a stock purchase made by his wife in June 2020.

In June 2024, an analysis by Raw Story found that Allen appeared to have violated the STOCK Act by being as much as six-and-a-half years late in reporting 136 stock and other financial transactions, worth up to $8.5 million, on his 2023 financial disclosure form. In response, a spokesperson for Allen blamed the reporting issues on a compliance firm hired by Allen, and stated that Allen had hired a new compliance firm "to ensure all trades have been properly reported."

==== Town halls ====
In March 2016, it was reported that Allen would hold a town hall in Statesboro, Georgia "specifically for veterans." On February 27, 2025, community members numbering from 70 over 100, depending on the time of day, gathered for a sit-in outside of Allen's office in Augusta, Georgia. They protested for Allen to hold a town hall meeting and expressed concerns about the second presidency of Donald Trump and related legislation. Instead of holding traditional in-person town halls, "over the years, Congressman Rick Allen has hosted telephone town hall meetings ... over-the-phone meetings where citizens can type out questions." Weeks later, in response to the protest, Allen stated that his practice of holding "digital town halls" would continue.

== Personal life ==
Allen lives in Augusta, Georgia, with his wife Robin. Allen has four children and 14 grandchildren. He is a Methodist and "active member" of Trinity on the Hill United Methodist Church. Allen spent almost a million dollars of his own money on the 2014 Georgia Republican primary, which he won. A 2018 publication estimated that Allen was one of the more wealthy US Congress members, with an estimated net worth somewhere between 17 and 87 million dollars. Allen has participated in charity golf in support of First Tee. His only son, Andy, has worked as a foreign service officer with the State Department.

== See also ==
- Anti-Zionism
- Christianity and homosexuality
- Legality of cannabis
- List of Auburn University people
- Project Esther
- Revolving door (politics)
- Visa and deportation controversies in the second Trump administration
- Weaponization of antisemitism

== Notes ==
U.S. House of Representatives
Preceded by John Barrow	Member of the U.S. House of Representatives from Georgia's 12th congressional district 2015–present	Incumbent
U.S. order of precedence (ceremonial)
Preceded by Pete Aguilar	United States representatives by seniority 126th	Succeeded by Brian Babin
