= William Boddie =

American politician

Minority Whip of the Georgia House of Representatives
- In office January 14, 2019 – January 11, 2021
- Preceded by: Carolyn Hugley
- Succeeded by: David Wilkerson

Member of the Georgia House of Representatives from the 62nd district
- In office January 9, 2017 – January 9, 2023
- Preceded by: LaDawn Jones
- Succeeded by: Tanya Miller

Personal details
- Born: June 12, 1977 (age 49) Atlanta, Georgia, U.S.
- Party: Democratic
- Education: Valdosta State University (BA); Michigan State University; Mercer University (JD)

William Kenneth Boddie Jr. (born June 12, 1977) is an American politician from the state of Georgia. A member of the Democratic Party, Boddie represented the 62nd district in the Georgia House of Representatives from 2017 to 2023. He served as House Minority Whip from 2019 to 2021.

Boddie ran for House Minority Leader in 2020, losing to Rep. James Beverly. He ran for Georgia Labor Commissioner in the 2022 elections, losing to Bruce Thompson.

Party political offices
Preceded by Richard Keatley	Democratic nominee for Labor Commissioner of Georgia; 2022	Succeeded by Nikki Porcher
