= Midtown Hospital =

Midtown Hospital may refer to:

- Midtown Hospital (Manhattan), a former hospital in Manhattan (1891-c. 1979)
- Midtown Hospital (Nashville), a hospital in Nashville
- Midtown Hospital, a hospital that operated within the Pappenheimer Mansion in Atlanta

== See also ==
- Deaconess Midtown Hospital
- Saint Thomas - Midtown Hospital
