= Paul B. Salter =

American politician

Member of the Georgia State Senate from the 17th district
- In office 1973–1974

Personal details
- Born: January 18, 1916 Pike County, Georgia, U.S.
- Died: December 31, 2004 (aged 88)
- Party: Democratic
- Education: Atlanta Law School

Paul B. Salter (January 18, 1916 – December 31, 2004) was an American politician. He served as a Democratic member for the 17th district of the Georgia State Senate.

== Life and career ==
Salter was born in Pike County, Georgia. He attended R. E. Lee Institute and Atlanta Law School.

Salter served in the Georgia State Senate from 1973 to 1974, representing the 17th district.

Salter died on December 31, 2004, at the age of 88.
