= Doe v. Bolton =

1973 United States Supreme Court case related to abortion rights

- Supreme Court of the United States

Argued December 13, 1971 Reargued October 11, 1972 Decided January 22, 1973
- Full case name: Mary Doe v. Arthur K. Bolton, Attorney General of Georgia, et al.
- Citations: 410 U.S. 179 (more) 93 S. Ct. 739; 35 L. Ed. 2d 201
- Related cases: Roe v. Wade
- Decision: Opinion

Case history
- Prior: Doe v. Bolton, 319 F. Supp. 1048 (N.D. Ga. 1970)

Questions presented
- Whether 26-1201 to 26-1203 of the Georgia Code by limiting the grounds for the performance of abortions deprive women and physicians of their fundamental rights of privacy and liberty in violation of the Ninth and Fourteenth Amendments to the Constitution

Holding
- The three procedural conditions in 26-1202 (b) of Ga. Criminal Code violate the Fourteenth Amendment. District Court for the Northern District of Georgia affirmed.

Court membership
- Chief Justice Warren E. Burger Associate Justices William O. Douglas · William J. Brennan Jr. Potter Stewart · Byron White; Thurgood Marshall · Harry Blackmun; Lewis F. Powell Jr. · William Rehnquist

Case opinions
- Majority: Blackmun, joined by Burger, Douglas, Brennan, Stewart, Marshall, Powell
- Concurrence: Burger
- Concurrence: Douglas
- Concurrence: Stewart
- Dissent: White, joined by Rehnquist
- Dissent: Rehnquist

Laws applied
- U.S. Const. Amend. XIV; Ga. Criminal Code § 26-1202 (b)
- Superseded by
- Dobbs v. Jackson Women's Health Organization (2022)

Doe v. Bolton, 410 U.S. 179 (1973), was a decision of the Supreme Court of the United States overturning the abortion law of Georgia. The Supreme Court's decision was released on January 22, 1973, the same day as the decision in the better-known case of Roe v. Wade.

== Background ==
The Georgia law in question permitted abortion only in cases of rape, severe fetal deformity, or the possibility of severe or fatal injury to the mother. Other restrictions included the requirement that the procedure be approved in writing by three physicians and by a three-member special committee that either (1) continued pregnancy would endanger the pregnant woman's life or "seriously and permanently" injure her health; (2) the fetus would "very likely be born with a grave, permanent and irremediable mental or physical defect"; or (3) the pregnancy resulted from rape or incest. In addition, only Georgia residents could receive abortions under this statutory scheme: non-residents could not have an abortion in Georgia under any circumstances.

The plaintiff, a pregnant woman who was given the pseudonym "Mary Doe" in court papers to protect her identity, sued Arthur K. Bolton, then the Attorney General of Georgia, as the official responsible for enforcing the law in the United States District Court for the Northern District of Georgia. The anonymous plaintiff has since been identified as Sandra Cano, a young mother of three who was nine weeks pregnant at the time the lawsuit was filed. Cano, who died in 2014, described herself as pro-life and claimed her attorney, Margie Pitts Hames, lied to her in order to have a plaintiff.

Hames claimed that Mrs. Doe had a neurochemical disorder which in her opinion and in the opinion of her physician made it inadvisable to continue her pregnancy. The lawyer claimed that the only way to avoid getting pregnant in the future was for Mr. and Mrs. Doe to abstain from sex. This argument described an ongoing harm to the couple's marital satisfaction in order to prevent judges from dismissing the case as moot once Cano gave birth.

On October 14, 1970, a three-judge panel of the U.S. District Court for the Northern District of Georgia consisting of Northern District of Georgia Judges Albert John Henderson, Sidney Oslin Smith Jr., and Fifth Circuit Court of Appeals Judge Lewis Render Morgan unanimously declared the conditional restrictions portion of the law unconstitutional, though upheld the medical approval and residency requirements. The court also declined to issue an injunction against enforcement of the law, similarly to the district court in the case Roe v. Wade. The plaintiff appealed to the Supreme Court under a statute, since repealed, permitting bypass of the circuit appeals court.

The oral arguments and re-arguments followed the same schedule as those in Roe. Atlanta attorney Hames represented Doe at the hearings, while Georgia assistant attorney general Dorothy Toth Beasley represented Bolton.

== Opinion of the Court ==
The same 7–2 majority that struck down a Texas abortion law in Roe v. Wade invalidated most of the remaining restrictions of the Georgia abortion law, including the medical approval and residency requirements. The Court reiterated the protected "right to privacy," which applied to matters involving marriage, procreation, contraception, family relationships, child rearing, and education. Justice Harry A. Blackmun wrote the majority opinion for the Court, in which he explained "the sensitive and emotional nature" of the issue and "the deep and seemingly absolute convictions" on both sides. Justice Blackmun went on to conclude that as a constitutional matter, the right to privacy was "broad enough to encompass a woman's decision whether or not to terminate her pregnancy."

Together, Doe and Roe declared abortion as a constitutional right and overturned most laws against abortion in other U.S. states. Roe legalized abortion nationwide for approximately the first six months of pregnancy until the point of fetal viability.

=== Definition of health ===
The Court's opinion in Doe v. Bolton stated that a woman may obtain an abortion until birth, if necessary to protect her health. The Court defined "health" as follows:

Whether, in the words of the Georgia statute, "an abortion is necessary" is a professional judgment that the Georgia physician will be called upon to make routinely. We agree with the District Court, 319 F. Supp., at 1058, that the medical judgment may be exercised in the light of all factors - physical, emotional, psychological, familial, and the woman's age - relevant to the well-being of the patient. All these factors may relate to health.

== Subsequent developments ==
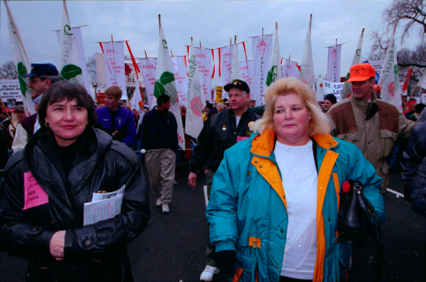
Sandra Cano (right) at the 1998 March for Life

The records for Doe concerning Cano were sealed until 1988, when Cano had them unsealed in order to answer questions she had about the case. After abortion rights advocates found out about Cano's legal and political actions, her car was shot at and vandalized with graffiti, and someone shot at her while she was on her front porch holding her baby grandchild.

In 2003, Sandra Cano filed a motion to re-open the case claiming that she had not been aware that the case had been filed on her behalf and that if she had known she would not have supported the litigation. The district court denied her motion, and she appealed. When the appeals court also denied her motion, she requested review by the United States Supreme Court. However, the Supreme Court declined to hear Sandra Cano's suit to overturn the ruling. Sandra Cano died on September 30, 2014.

== See also ==
- Canadian Supreme Court case of R. v. Morgentaler finding Canada's abortion law unconstitutional
- German Federal Constitutional Court abortion decision
- List of United States Supreme Court cases, volume 410
