= Robin Shahar =

American attorney (born 1963)

- Born: April 7, 1963 (age 63); Philadelphia, Pennsylvania, US
- Education: Tufts University (college); Emory University (law school)
- Occupation: Lawyer
- Years active: 1991–present
- Known for: Plaintiff in Shahar v. Bowers; LGBT advisor to Kasim Reed
- Spouses: Fran Greenfield (Note: Not legally recognized.) (m. 1991; sep. 2009) Pam Joy (m. 2016)
- Children: 2

Robin Shahar (born April 7, 1963) is an American attorney. In 1991, Shahar was involved in Shahar v. Bowers, a landmark case for LGBT rights in the United States, when she sued Mike Bowers, the attorney general of Georgia, for rescinding a job offer after he discovered she planned to have a same-sex wedding ceremony. The 11th Circuit Court of Appeals ultimately upheld Bowers' decision to rescind Shahar's job offer. Shahar has since worked as a human rights attorney and been involved in Atlanta politics.

== Early life ==
Shahar was born on April 7, 1963, in Philadelphia, Pennsylvania, to Edward Brown and Belle "Bunny" van Adelsberg (formerly Brown). She has a brother, Scott, as well as a half-sister, Stephanie, and several step-siblings. She was raised in Cheltenham Township, Pennsylvania. Shahar graduated from Tufts University and received her Juris Doctor degree in 1991 from Emory University.

== Career ==
=== Shahar v. Bowers ===
During the summer of 1990, Shahar, in her final year of law school, worked in the office of Georgia Attorney General Mike Bowers. Bowers had previously been the defendant in another major LGBTQ-related lawsuit, Bowers v. Hardwick, regarding the constitutionality of Georgia's sodomy law. As Shahar prepared to return to school, in September 1990, Bowers offered her a job in his office for when she graduated, which she accepted in November of that year with the intention to start at the office in autumn of 1991.

Around the same time, Shahar was preparing a Jewish marriage ceremony with her partner, Fran Greenfield, a woman. When Bowers heard about her plans for the wedding in July 1991, he rescinded her job offer, citing her upcoming wedding as the reason. Shahar sued, claiming that Bowers had unlawfully rescinded the offer by violating her First Amendment rights to freedom of religion and intimate expression, her Fourteenth Amendment right to equal protection, and her Fifth Amendment right due process.

The district court entered a summary judgement in favor of Bowers, and Shahar appealed to the Eleventh Circuit Court. Bowers argued that Shahar's lesbian relationship and upcoming wedding was evidence that she lacked "good sense", and that it would interfere with her ability to enforce Georgia's sodomy law as part of her duties. Although a three-judge panel initially reversed the district court ruling, on appeal the full Eleventh Circuit Court ultimately ruled in favor of Bowers, ruling that Bowers' interests as an employer outweighed Shahar's constitutional interests.

=== Later career ===
After losing the Bowers decision, Shahar worked as an attorney for the city of Atlanta, during which time she wrote and defended the city's domestic partnership ordinance. In 2013, Shahar became Atlanta mayor Kasim Reed's advisor on LGBT rights and issues. As of 2023, Shahar works as a human rights attorney.

== Personal life ==
Shahar is a lesbian, and came out after graduating from college. Shahar married Fran Greenfield in a Jewish wedding in Atlanta in 1991, though they were not legally married, as there was no legal gay marriage in the United States at the time. Shahar and Greenfield had two children, Eli and Rosie, who they co-parented with a gay male couple. In 2023, Shahar said of her family arrangement and her children, "My kids have two moms and two dads. We are an unusual family in that way. And at the time that our kids were born, I think having gay or lesbian, just two parents, was unusual, let alone four." Shahar and Greenfield separated in 2009. In 2016, Shahar remarried to Pam Joy. As of 2023, Shahar still resides in Atlanta.

Shahar is Jewish and describes her Jewish faith as "very important" to her. She is active in Congregation Bet Haverim, Atlanta's first gay and lesbian synagogue, where she served as the organization vice president and was involved with an AIDS support group.
