= Attorney General Napier =

Attorney General Napier may refer to:

- George M. Napier (1863–1932), Attorney General of Georgia
- Sir Joseph Napier, 1st Baronet (1804–1882), Attorney-General for Ireland

== See also ==
- General Napier (disambiguation)
