= Sandra Cano (Mary Doe) =

Plaintiff in the 1973 United States Supreme Court case Doe v. Bolton

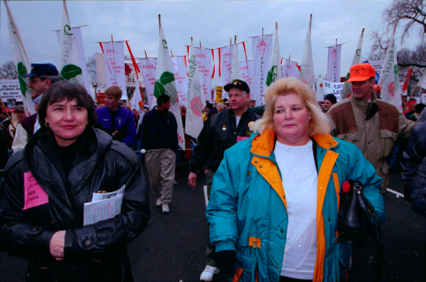
Sandra Cano (right) at the 1998 March for Life

Sandra Cano (born 1947/1948 – September 30, 2014), (née Race) better known by the legal pseudonym "Mary Doe," was the plaintiff in the lawsuit case Doe v. Bolton (1970), the companion case to Roe v. Wade (1973) which legalized abortion in the United States. Cano held anti-abortion views and claimed she had been manipulated by her lawyer, Margie Pitts Hames. She repeatedly attempted to have the decision overturned. She also undertook anti-abortion activism, with Norma Jane McCorvey (Jane Roe) among others, and filed a Friend of the Court brief seeking to limit partial birth abortions.

== Early life ==
Cano was born in 1947/1948 in Georgia to an impoverished, abusive family. She stood out among her peers, as she was overweight, had Bell's palsy, and had a learning disability. She went to school until she dropped out in the ninth grade. She met Joe Bensing, a gas station employee from Oklahoma, when she was seventeen years old and soon became pregnant with his child. Her parents called a "shotgun" wedding in 1965 when they found out. Prior to their relationship, Bensing was convicted multiple times as a child molester and kidnapper and continued to violate his probation throughout their marriage.

== Journey to Supreme Court case ==
In 1968, her mother forced her into a mental institution due to her stress from her chaotic marriage, but she escaped soon after and never went back. She still had concerns with her mental stability, causing the juvenile court's decision to place her children in foster care. When she was twenty-two years old, she sought out a lawyer to help her get a divorce and gain custody of her two children in foster care. She discovered the Atlanta Legal Aid Office and was introduced to an ACLU lawyer named Margie Pitts Hames when she was pregnant with her fourth child.

=== Personal position ===
While working on Cano's divorce and custody case, Hames became involved in the Doe v. Bolton case, a lawsuit against the Georgia attorney general Arthur K. Bolton. There is no clear claim as to how Cano became involved in the Doe case despite her self-proclaimed anti-abortion stance; Cano claims that Hames never notified her of her role as a plaintiff in a case to legalize abortion and was asked to sign documents, which Cano never read. Other stories claim that Cano purposely went to the Atlanta Legal Aid to file for a divorce alongside an abortion on March 25, 1970, at the Grady Memorial Hospital, the only nearby hospital where impoverished people could receive free abortions.

=== Lower court decision ===
A month later, three local district court judges heard her case. After sixteen days, they ruled in favor of Hames' argument and struck down parts of Georgia's abortion law. The law stated that women who wanted an abortion needed to consult their primary doctor, two other doctors, and the hospital's committee. It also limited abortion to residents of Georgia who had evidence of carrying deformed fetuses, health-risking pregnancies, and being victims of rape. It was sent to the Supreme Court, as both Hames and Bolton appealed. Hames claims that she informed Cano of a chance to testify her wishes to have an abortion, and Cano agreed.

== Supreme Court case (Doe v. Bolton) ==
In preparation for the Supreme Court case, Hames applied Cano for an abortion without Cano's knowledge. When the abortion was approved, Hames notified Cano, who strongly reiterated that she did not want an abortion. At the time, she was 6 months pregnant. Cano, afraid that she would be forced to have the abortion, fled to Oklahoma until her mother and Hames assured her that she would not have to abort the child.

=== Legal argument ===
On the day of the Supreme Court case, Hames prepared three arguments supporting the reformation of Georgia's abortion law. First, she argued that there was a conflict of what constituted a "legal abortion" due to the vague requirements that doctors had to meet in order to approve an abortion. She claimed this was a violation of the due process clause of the Fourteenth Amendment. Hames's second claim was that the abortion law of Georgia did not have the right to override women's decisions to have an abortion. She used the decision made in Griswold v. Connecticut and the Fourteenth Amendment to support her claim. Finally, Hames argued that Georgia's abortion law negatively impacted medical professionals and marginalized women, as abortions were only allowed to be performed in state approved hospitals. This limited the number of hospitals women could receive abortions at, which infringed on the equal protection clause of the Fourteenth Amendment.

=== Cano in court ===
Despite Hames' argument, Cano did not fully understand the events of the case, and Hames instructed Cano to only spectate the proceedings. She never testified on paper or verbally for her case. Bolton emphasized the fact that Cano was never asked if she was pregnant or if she ever wanted an abortion. If Cano was given the chance to testify, the court would have discovered Cano's anti-abortion stance. Cano stated feeling manipulated by Hames because she was used to be a plaintiff in a case that supported a view on abortion that she disagreed on, especially by a lawyer who was assisting her in a vulnerable stage in her life.

=== Decision ===
The decision for Doe v. Bolton was given on January 22, 1973, the same day as the famous companion case Roe v. Wade. The majority was given by Justice Blackmun in the 7–2 decision, which restricted Georgia's anti-abortion law. The Supreme Court used the Fourteenth Amendment's implied right to privacy to back up their decision. The decision established the definition of the "health of the mother," clarifying that the definition of health includes multiple factors: "physical, psychological, familial, and the woman's age."

== Life after court decision ==
After the 1973 decision, Sandra strongly reiterated that she was anti-abortion and searched for ways to overturn the decision. In the following year, she went to Georgia Right to Life, attempting to find someone who could analyze the impact of her role in Doe v. Bolton. She began her alliance with the president of the Justice Foundation, Allan Parker, in Fayetteville, NC. She failed to reverse the decision in 1989, in 2000 in a Rule 60 Motion, and in 2006. In her attempts, she testified that her role in the Doe case was misleading due to her opposition to abortion. She was quoted as saying she "[didn't] want to be part of something that is so deadly wrong..."

In 2007, she and 180 other women who had previous experiences with abortion worked alongside the Justice Foundation to file a Friend of the Court Brief at the Supreme Court in support of a federal ban on partial birth abortion. Taking into account the women's claims on struggles after abortion, including depression and low self-esteem, the Court recognized Cano as anti-Abortion, reversing her reputation from her case. In 2014, Cano worked to support North Dakota's ban on abortions at the point of a noticeable heartbeat, or six weeks, by speaking to the States Court of Appeals for the Eighth Circuit.

== Later years ==
Cano was able to reconnect with her daughter, Melissa Able, in 1989, who was 19 years old with a husband and child at the time. They resided together until a fight ensued a few months later about their differing views on abortion.

On January 14, 2002, Cano, Norma McCovey, the plaintiff in the Roe v. Wade case, and multiple anti-abortion organizations came together to create the "Shake the Nation Back to Life Campaign" with a purpose of convincing President Bush and the Senate that abortion is detrimental to both the child and the mother. They wanted the Bush administration to elect anti-abortion members of the judicial branch who would have a different stance on abortion.

Cano died on September 30, 2014.
