= Margie Pitts Hames =

American civil rights lawyer (1933–1994)

Margie Pitts Hames (December 8, 1933 – July 19, 1994) was an Atlanta civil rights lawyer who argued the abortion rights case Doe v. Bolton before the U.S. Supreme Court.

== Biography ==
Hames was born in Milton, Tennessee, to a poor rural family. As a schoolgirl, Hames encountered a schoolteacher who stated that the only acceptable time for an abortion was "when a black man raped a white woman." In 1951, Hames graduated from Kittrell High School in Murfreesboro, Tennessee.

While working as a legal secretary, Hames began studying law at Middle Tennessee State University. She later transferred to Vanderbilt University, where she earned bachelor's and law degrees in 1961.

In 1962, Hames entered law practice in Atlanta with the law firm of Fisher & Phillips, specializing in labor-management relations. In 1969, after the birth of her two children, Hames started volunteer work for the Lawyers' Committee for Civil Rights Under Law. The Ford Foundation had funded this project with the goal of preventing confrontations between civil rights demonstrators and law enforcement.

In 1970, the American Civil Liberties Union and the Atlanta Legal Aid Society hired Hames to contest a 1968 abortion law in Georgia. The plaintiff "Doe" was Sandra Bensing Cano, a pregnant woman who had been unable to get a legal abortion. The defendant was the Georgia attorney general, Arthur Bolton. Sandra Cano was attempting to gain a divorce and custody of her previous two children at the time she sought legal representation. Cano held pro-life views, and claimed that Hames had manipulated her.

Hames was the main lawyer in Doe v. Bolton when it came before the US Supreme Court along with Roe v. Wade. On January 22, 1973, the court overturned the Georgia law.

In 1971, Hames opened her own law firm. She would eventually serve as legal counsel for the Atlanta Surgi Center, the Hillcrest Clinic, the Summit Medical Center, Midtown Hospital, and the Atlanta Center for Reproductive Health. She also handled civil rights claims regarding police brutality, employment discrimination, welfare rights and education cases. In 1982, she ran unsuccessfully for the Georgia Supreme Court.

In 1994, Hames died at age 60 at Piedmont Hospital in Atlanta after suffering a heart attack while driving. She is buried in Milton Cemetery in Milton, Tennessee.

== Posthumous ==
In 2006, as part of a court challenge, Cano (died September 30, 2014) claimed that Hames lied to her and pressured her into participating in Doe v. Bolton. Before her death, Hames had rejected this coercion claim. The US Supreme Court rejected Cano's challenge.
