= Flight 650 =

Flight 650 may refer to:

- Ozark Air Lines Flight 650, crashed on 20 December 1983
- Northwest Flight 650, pilots drunk on 8 March 1990
