= Tanya Miller =

American politician (born 1973)

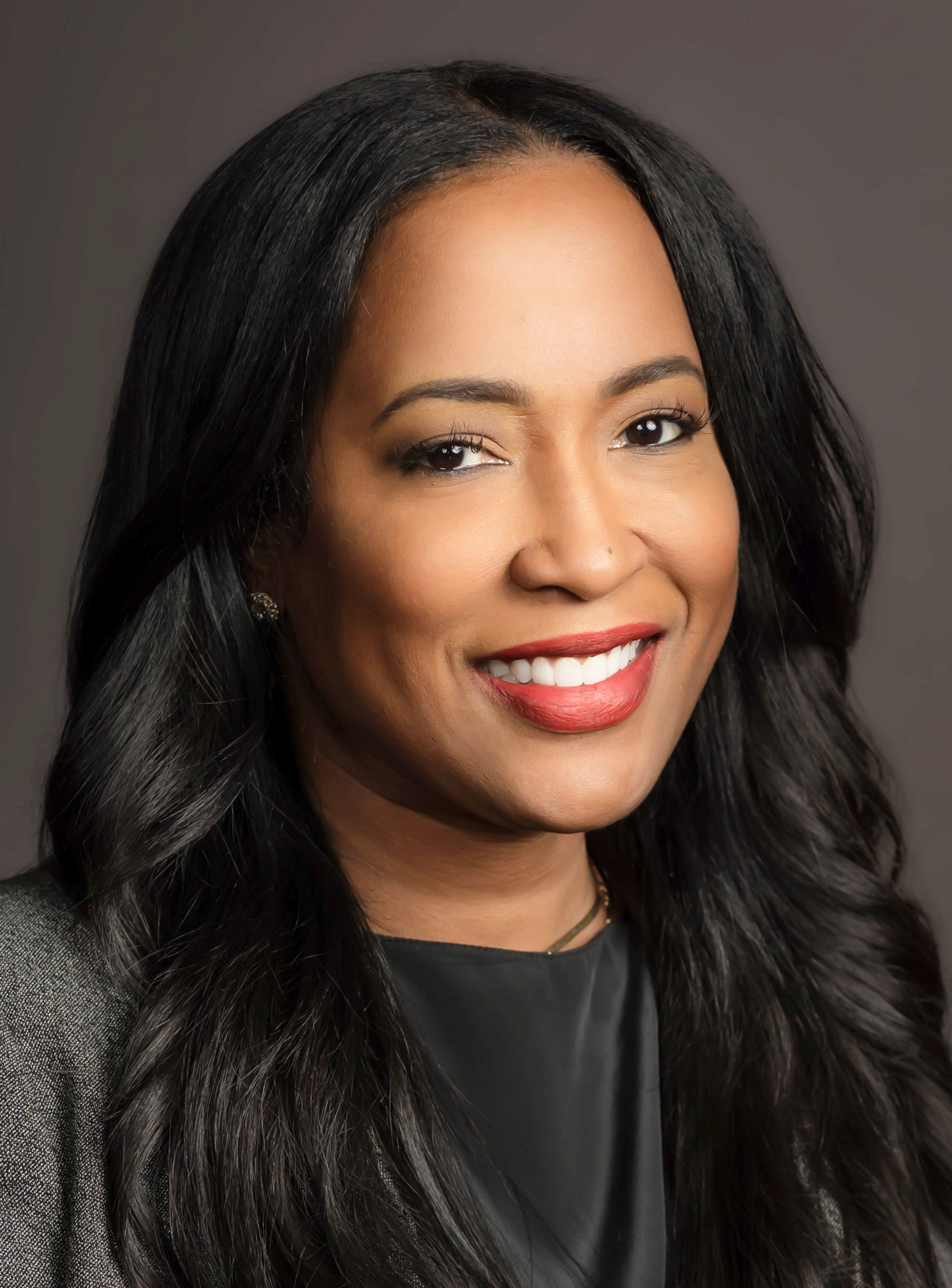
- Official portrait, 2023

Attorney General-elect of Georgia
- Assuming office January 2027
- Governor: Keisha Lance Bottoms (elect)
- Succeeding: Chris Carr

Member of the Georgia House of Representatives from the 62nd district
- Incumbent
- Assumed office January 9, 2023
- Preceded by: David Dreyer (redistricted)

Personal details
- Born: October 3, 1973 (age 53) Cleveland, Ohio, U.S.
- Party: Democratic
- Education: Case Western Reserve University (BA, JD)
- Website: State house website Campaign website

Tanya Felecia Miller (born October 3, 1973) is an American lawyer and politician who is the attorney general-elect of Georgia, the first woman to be elected to that office. A member of the Democratic Party, she has served as a member of the Georgia House of Representatives representing District 62 since January 2023.

== Early life and education ==
Miller was born in Cleveland, Ohio, where she was raised by her union worker mother. She is a 1992 graduate of the Cleveland Heights–University Heights City School District. Miller then graduated from Case Western Reserve University with a Bachelor of Arts in sociology and philosophy in 1996 followed by a Juris Doctor from the university's law school in 1999.

== Legal career ==
After graduating from law school, Miller worked as associate at Jones Day in Cleveland then served as a federal judicial law clerk to United States district judge Solomon Oliver, Jr. in the Northern District of Ohio. She was then appointed an assistant United States attorney in the Southern District of New York.

Miller has been an admitted member of the State Bar of Georgia since December 2005. She is a prosecutor and assistant district attorney in Fulton County. Her time on the homicide unit in Fulton County was dramatized on the Investigation Discovery cable network show Atlanta Justice, which ran from 2020 to 2021. Miller runs the Atlanta personal injury law firm Miller Injury Trial Law.

In 2014, Miller was a defense attorney for Russian mobster Mani Chulpayev in his trial for the murder of rapper Lil Phat.

== Political career ==
Miller was elected to the Georgia House of Representatives in 2022. She endorsed the Kamala Harris 2024 presidential campaign.

In August 2025, Miller announced her candidacy for the 2026 Georgia Attorney General election. She defeated former state house minority leader Bob Trammell in the Democratic primary and went on to win the general election against the Republican nominee, state senator Brian Strickland. This made her the first woman elected attorney general of Georgia.

== See also ==
- List of African-American statewide elected officials
- List of female state attorneys general in the United States
- Timeline of African-American firsts

Political offices
Preceded by Chris Carr	Georgia Attorney General; Assuming office 2027	Elect
Party political offices
Preceded by Jen Jordan	Democratic nominee for Attorney General of Georgia; 2026	Most recent
