= Judge Marsh =

Judge Marsh may refer to:

- John Otho Marsh Jr. (1926–2019), town judge of Strasburg, Virginia
- Joseph Marsh (1726–1811), judge of the Confiscation Court for eastern Vermont
- Juanita Marsh (1926–2013), judge of the College Park, Georgia, municipal court
- Malcolm F. Marsh (1928–2025), judge of the United States District Court for the District of Oregon
- Rabe Ferguson Marsh Jr. (1905–1993), judge of the United States District Court for the Western District of Pennsylvania
- Robert McC. Marsh (1878–1958), judge of the New York Supreme Court
- Spencer M. Marsh (1864–1932), judge of the San Diego County Superior Court
