= General Napier =

General Napier may refer to:

- Charles James Napier (1782–1853), British Army general
- Charles Scott Napier (1899–1946), British Army major general
- George Thomas Napier (1784–1855), British Army lieutenant general
- Lennox Napier (1928–2020), British Army major general
- Robert Napier (British Army officer, died 1766), British Army lieutenant general
- Thomas Napier (British Army officer) (1790–1863), British Army general
- Robert Napier, 1st Baron Napier of Magdala (1810–1890), British Indian Army general

== See also ==
- Attorney General Napier (disambiguation)
