= Georgia's 143rd House of Representatives district =

State district in Georgia, USA

Georgia's 143rd State House of Representatives district
Representative
Anissa Jones; D–Macon
- Demographics: 31.4% White; 64.3% Black; 2.1% Hispanic; 0.7% Asian
- Population: 52,336

District 143 elects one member of the Georgia House of Representatives. It contains parts of Bibb County and Houston County.

== Members ==
- James Beverly (2013–2025)
- Anissa Jones (since 2025)
