= Brian Strickland =

American politician (born 1983)

- Official portrait, 2025

Member of the Georgia State Senate from the 42nd district
- Incumbent
- Assumed office January 16, 2018
- Preceded by: Rick Jeffares
- Constituency: 17th district (2018–2025); 42nd district (2025–present)

Member of the Georgia House of Representatives from the 111th district
- In office January 14, 2013 – December 1, 2017
- Preceded by: Bruce Williamson
- Succeeded by: Geoff Cauble

Personal details
- Born: Robert Brian Strickland; October 26, 1983 (age 43) Henry County, Georgia, U.S.
- Party: Republican
- Spouse: Lindsay Perdue (m. 2014)
- Children: 2
- Education: Valdosta State University (BBA); Florida Coastal School of Law (JD)
- Website: State senate website Campaign website

Robert Brian Strickland (born October 26, 1983) is an American politician who has served in the Georgia State Senate from the 42nd district since 2025 and the 17th district from 2018 to 2025. He previously served in the Georgia House of Representatives from the 111th district from 2013 to 2017.

In January 2024, Strickland co-sponsored S.B. 390, which would withhold government funding for any libraries in Georgia affiliated with the American Library Association. The bill was drafted following the election of ALA President Emily Drabinski and allegations of the organization promoting a personal ideology and influencing librarian certification.

Strickland was the Republican nominee in the 2026 Georgia Attorney General election. He lost the general election to Democratic state Representative Tanya Miller on November 3, 2026. Democrat Pastor Eric Lee was elected to represent the 42nd District.

Party political offices
Preceded by Chris Carr	Republican nominee for Attorney General of Georgia; 2026	Most recent
