= John E. Frankum =

American judge (1898–1978)

John Eccleston Frankum (March 6, 1898 – June 7, 1978) was the hief Justice on the Supreme Court of Georgia from 1967 to 1970.

== Early life, education, and career ==
Born in Habersham County, Georgia, Frankum received his law degree from Atlanta Law School in 1920 and entered the practice of law in Clarkesville, Georgia. He was mayor of Clarkesville from 1931 to 1936.

== Judicial career ==
After serving for periods as a city court judge in Clarkesville, and as the city's solicitor general, Frankum was appointed to the Georgia Court of Appeals in 1960 by Governor Ernest Vandiver. He was elected to the seat in November of that year, and reelected in 1966, serving only one year into his second term before Governor Lester Maddox appointed him to a seat on the Georgia Supreme Court, vacated by the death of Eugene Cook from a self-inflicted gunshot wound.

Frankum resigned from the court in 1970. He died eight years later, after a lengthy illness.

Political offices
Preceded by Eugene Cook	Justice of the Supreme Court of Georgia; 1967–1970	Succeeded by Peyton Hawes
