= Georgia's 136th House of Representatives district =

State district in Georgia, USA

Georgia's 136th State House of Representatives district
Representative
David Jenkins; R–Grantville
- Demographics: 32.6% White; 53.9% Black; 8.1% Hispanic; 1.7% Asian
- Population: 56,884

District 136 elects one member of the Georgia House of Representatives. It contains parts of Coweta County, Meriwether County and Troup County.

== Members ==
- Carolyn Hugley (2013–2023)
- David Jenkins (since 2023)
