= LaDawn Jones =

American lawyer and politician from Georgia

LaDawn Blackett Jones

Member of the Georgia House of Representatives for the 62nd district
- In office 2013–2017
- Preceded by: Joe Heckstall
- Succeeded by: William Boddie

Personal details
- Born: May 28, 1980 (age 46) Houston, Texas, U.S.
- Party: Democratic
- Education: Tennessee State University; Tulane University Law School

LaDawn Blackett Jones (born May 28, 1980) is an American lawyer and politician.

== Early year and education ==
She was born LaDawn Blackett on May 28, 1980, in Houston, Texas, to Wayne and Bonnie Blackett. In 1985, when she was five, her family moved to Atlanta, Georgia, where she attended St. Anthony's Catholic School. She later attended Osborne High School in Cobb County before ultimately graduating from Westlake High School in Fulton County. In 1998, she enrolled in Tennessee State University, graduating in 2002, cum laude, with a B.A. in English. She subsequently enrolled in Tulane University Law School. While at Tulane, Jones created a diversity program that was nominated for an American Bar Association Community Service award.

== Law career ==
After passing the bar exam, Jones obtained a position with the Fulton County District Attorney's office, as an assistant district attorney. She was subsequently promoted to Chief Senior Assistant District Attorney, and Community Prosecutor for Zone 4 in southwest Atlanta. After 18 months in the unit, Jones was designated as the units first Director. The unit placed prosecutors throughout the county, by opening four new offices.

== Political service ==
In 2012 Jones was elected to the Georgia House of Representatives, and served two terms from 2013 to 2017, representing a portion of Fulton County in District 62 as a member of the Democratic party.
