= Georgia's 132nd House of Representatives district =

State district in Georgia, USA

Georgia's 132nd State House of Representatives district
Representative
Brian Prince; D–Augusta
- Demographics: 47.9% White; 43.1% Black; 4.8% Hispanic; 1.5% Asian
- Population: 54,531

District 132 elects one member of the Georgia House of Representatives. It contains the entirety of Jefferson County and parts of Richmond County.

== Members ==
- Carl Von Epps Jr. (until 2015)
- Bob Trammell (2015–2021)
- David Jenkins (2021–2023)
- Brian Prince (since 2023)
