= Mike Bowers =

Attorney General of Georgia from 1981 to 1997

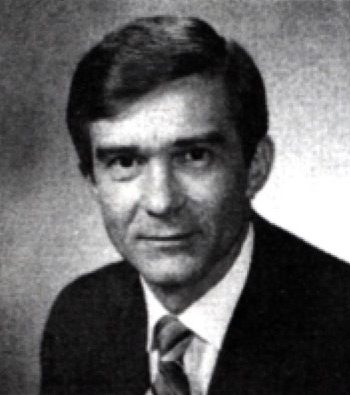

45th Attorney General of Georgia
- In office 1981–1997
- Governor: George Busbee; Joe Frank Harris; Zell Miller
- Preceded by: Arthur K. Bolton
- Succeeded by: Thurbert E. Baker

Personal details
- Born: Michael Joseph Bowers; October 7, 1941 (age 85) Commerce, Georgia, U.S.
- Party: Republican (after 1994); Democratic (before 1994)
- Spouse: Betty Rose
- Education: United States Military Academy (BS) *Stanford University (MS) *University of Utah (MBA) *University of Georgia (JD)
- Occupation: Lawyer

Michael Joseph Bowers (born October 7, 1941) is an American lawyer and politician who served as the Attorney General of Georgia from 1981 to 1997 before mounting an unsuccessful campaign for Georgia Governor. Bowers was a Democrat through 1994, at which time he joined the Republican Party. Bowers has practiced law with Balch & Bingham in Atlanta. He now practices law at Johnson Marlowe LLP in Athens, Georgia.

== Early life ==
Bowers was born in Commerce, Georgia. He graduated from the United States Military Academy with a B.S. degree in 1963 and served in the United States Air Force from 1963 to 1970. Bowers received an M.S. degree in industrial engineering from Stanford University in 1965 and an M.B.A. from the University of Utah in 1970. He joined the Georgia Air National Guard on September 19, 1970 and earned his J.D. degree from the University of Georgia in 1974, and then worked as an assistant state attorney general until his appointment as attorney general in 1981. Running as the incumbent attorney general on the Democratic ticket, he was elected in his own right in 1982. He was re-elected in 1986 and 1990. In early 1994, he quit the Democratic Party to become a Republican, and won re-election again later that year. Bowers resigned as attorney general in June 1997 to run for the Republican nomination for governor in 1998. He also retired from military service on August 31, 1997 with the rank of major general.

== Attorney General ==
Bowers was known as a very active attorney general. He did not come from a privileged background and his public service exhibited a populist flair. He vigorously opposed conflicts of interest by public officials and contractors that might undermine loyalty to the citizenry and the public's confidence in state government. For instance, despite fierce opposition from entrenched interests, Bowers was successful in convincing the courts that, due to an inherent conflict of interest, state legislators who were lawyers could not sue the state.

== Corruption fighter ==
Bowers vigorously opposed public corruption. His targets included long-serving Georgia Labor Commissioner Sam Caldwell, whom he prosecuted for fraud. Bowers also prosecuted powerful highway construction companies for bid-rigging practices that were anti-competitive.

At the end of his tenure, one newspaper described Bowers's service as follows: "Unquestioned integrity and dedication to principles have been hallmarks of his administration, even though his unwillingness to compromise has angered politicians and constituents." Another well-known Georgia political commentator stated that in Bowers "we have come to expect an unconstrained, outspoken and active attorney general."

== Affair ==
Bowers's political ambitions were derailed when, during his campaign for the 1998 Republican gubernatorial nomination, he admitted to a decade-long extramarital affair with his employee and secretary, a former Playboy Club waitress. The woman, Anne Davis, stated that the romance had been active as recently as six weeks prior to Bowers's June 5, 1997, announcement. Bowers went on to lose the 1998 Republican primary to Guy Millner, finishing with 39.92 percent of the vote compared with Millner's 50.38 percent.

== Bowers v. Hardwick ==
Bowers controversially performed the duties of his office by defending the constitutionality of a Georgia criminal sodomy statute in a test case brought by the ACLU. The plaintiff was Michael Hardwick, a man who had been arrested by the Atlanta Police Department on charges including violation of the state sodomy statute. (Hardwick had engaged in consensual sex in the privacy of his own home.) The relevant county district attorney refused to prosecute the case, but the courts ruled that Hardwick nevertheless had standing to challenge the constitutionality of the statute. The United States Supreme Court upheld the statute in Bowers v. Hardwick (1986). The Georgia statute that Michael Hardwick had challenged was overturned by the Georgia Supreme Court in a subsequent case in 1998. The U.S. Supreme Court later overturned its Bowers ruling in a 2003 decision, Lawrence v. Texas, in which it stated that "Bowers was not correct when it was decided, and it is not correct today." Bowers has declined further comment on the case, saying "I did my job as best I knew how, and reasonable people can disagree about it, but that's all I want to say about it now."

== Shahar v. Bowers ==
Bowers faced controversy again in 1991 when he rescinded a hiring offer to a lesbian, Robin Shahar, for an assistant attorney general position because she had stated that she planned to participate in a religious ceremony of which Bowers did not approve: Shahar was planning a same-sex marriage ceremony with the blessing of her Jewish faith. Bowers claimed that Shahar's sexual orientation would prevent her from enforcing the state's sodomy law. Shahar sued Bowers, but the courts ruled that Bowers had not violated her constitutional rights in rescinding the job offer.

== Private practice ==
Since leaving public office, Bowers has entered private practice. In one notable case, he successfully sued Fulton County, Georgia for "reverse" discrimination against several white library employees who were given job reassignments because of their race. (Fulton County eventually settled for $18 million.)

Bowers successfully led the merger of his Atlanta-based firm into the larger Alabama-based firm of Balch & Bingham in June, 2003.

In 2003, Bowers started a government relations and lobbying firm with his son Bruce Bowers and John Watson, the political consultant for Georgia's then-governor, Sonny Perdue. Bowers said they had a simple objective: "to make money."

In 2015, Bowers stated that his views on gay rights had "changed," and he lobbied the Georgia legislature in opposition to legislation that would allow discrimination against LGBT people on the basis of personal religious views.

In September, 2020 Bowers joined the Athens law firm Johnson Marlowe LLP as counsel.

== Awards ==
His military awards include the Legion of Merit and the Meritorious Service Medal. He received an honorary degree in Doctor of Laws in 1988 from Oglethorpe University.

== See also ==
- List of American politicians who switched parties in office

Party political offices
Preceded by Arthur K. Bolton	Democratic nominee for Attorney General of Georgia; 1982, 1986, 1990	Succeeded by Wesley Dunn
First	Republican nominee for Attorney General of Georgia; 1994	Succeeded by David Ralston
