= Bob Trammell =

American politician

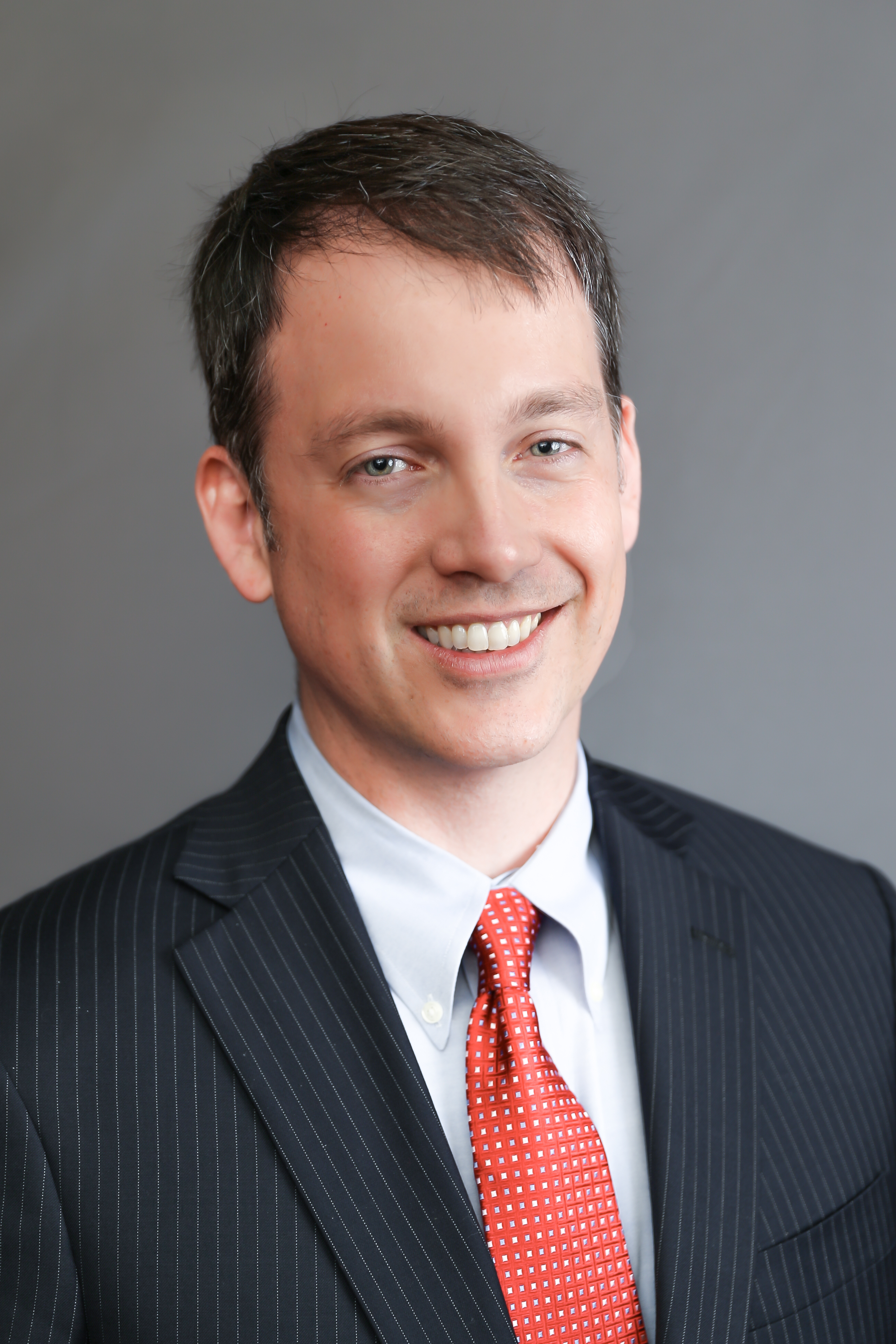

Minority Leader of the Georgia House of Representatives
- In office July 24, 2017 – January 11, 2021
- Preceded by: Stacey Abrams
- Succeeded by: James Beverly

Member of the Georgia House of Representatives from the 132nd district
- In office January 12, 2015 – January 11, 2021
- Preceded by: Carl Von Epps
- Succeeded by: David Jenkins

Personal details
- Born: Robert Thomas Trammell Jr. February 27, 1974 (age 52) Macon, Georgia, U.S.
- Party: Democratic
- Education: University of Georgia (BA); University of Virginia (JD)

Robert Thomas Trammell Jr. (born February 27, 1974) is an American politician from the state of Georgia. A member of the Democratic Party, Trammell represented the 132nd district in the Georgia House of Representatives and served as the minority leader from 2017 to 2021.

== Early life and career ==
Trammell attended the University of Georgia for his undergraduate education where he majored in English and Political Science. He earned a Juris Doctor from the University of Virginia School of Law.

Trammell clerked at the United States District Court for the Northern District of Georgia. Before entering the Georgia House, Trammell was the county attorney for Meriwether County. As of 2020, Trammell lives in Luthersville, Georgia.

== Political career ==
Trammell was first elected to the Georgia House in 2014, succeeding Carl Von Epps, who did not run for reelection. In 2018, he was re-elected to his seat in District 132.

In 2017, Trammell became the minority leader of the Georgia House, succeeding Stacey Abrams, who resigned to focus on her gubernatorial campaign. In the 2017 legislative session, Trammell served on four committees (Government Affairs, Judiciary, Information & Audits, and Motor Vehicles.). After the 2018 elections, Trammell became the only House Democrat to represent a seat that voted for both President Donald Trump and incoming governor Brian Kemp.

In 2020, Trammell was narrowly defeated for re-election by Republican David Jenkins. The race attracted large attention, and the Republican State Leadership Committee spent almost $1 million against Trammell.

On July 1, 2025, Trammell filed paperwork ahead of a run for attorney general of Georgia in 2026, seeking to succeed Republican attorney general Christopher M. Carr, who is running for governor.

Georgia House of Representatives
Preceded by Stacey Abrams	Minority Leader of the Georgia House of Representatives; 2017–2021	Succeeded by James Beverly
