= Anissa Jones (politician) =

American politician

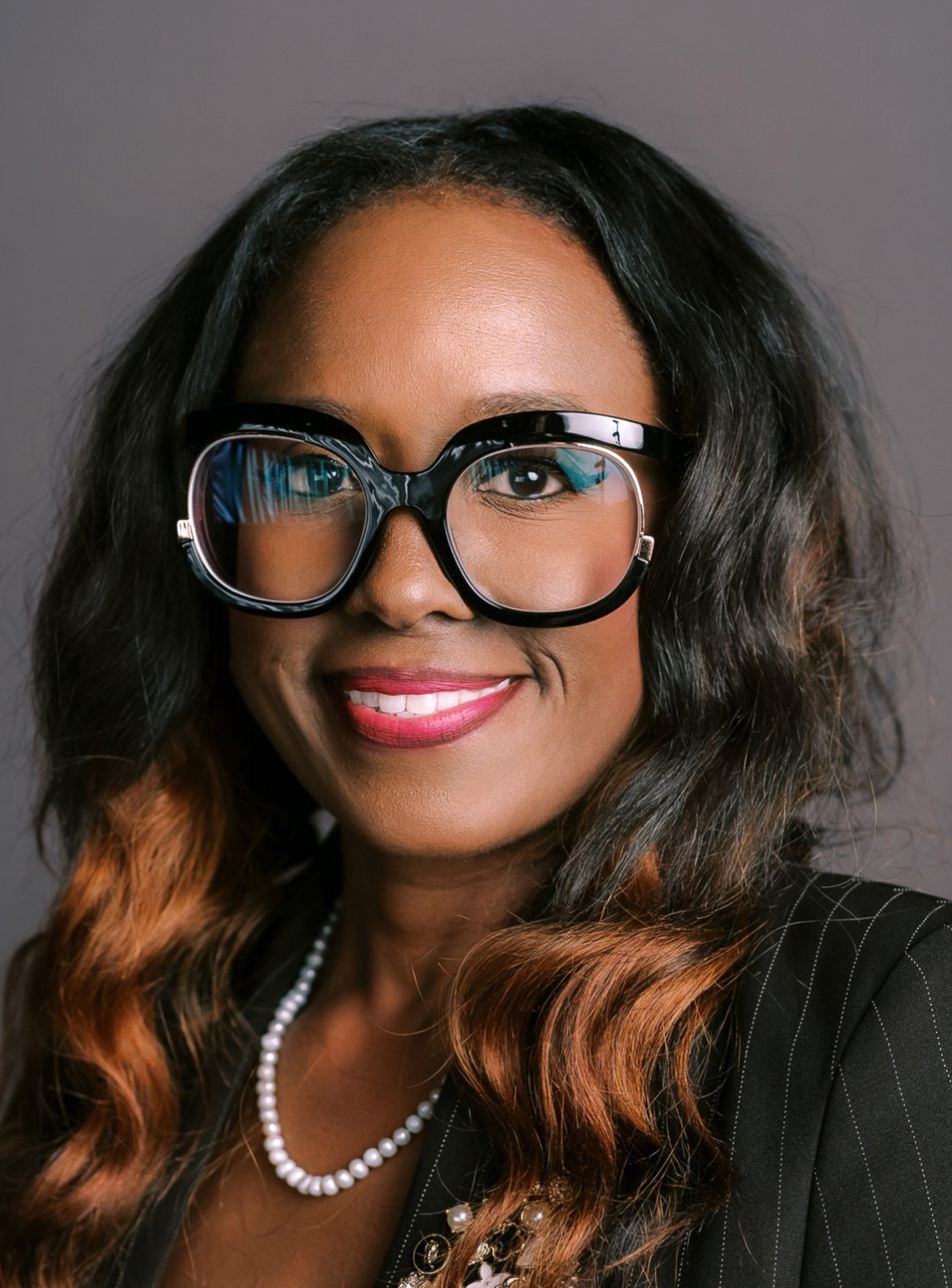

Member of the Georgia House of Representatives from the 143rd district
- Incumbent
- Assumed office January 13, 2025
- Succeeded by: James Beverly

Personal details
- Born: Anissa Monique Jones Macon, Georgia, U.S.
- Party: Democratic

Anissa Monique Jones is an American politician who was elected member of the Georgia House of Representatives for the 143rd district in 2024.

Jones graduated from Fort Valley State University, Life University and Wesleyan College. She is the first African American Chiropractor in Macon, Georgia.

== Political positions ==
Jones supports term limits.
