= 2026 Georgia Attorney General election =

- November 3, 2026
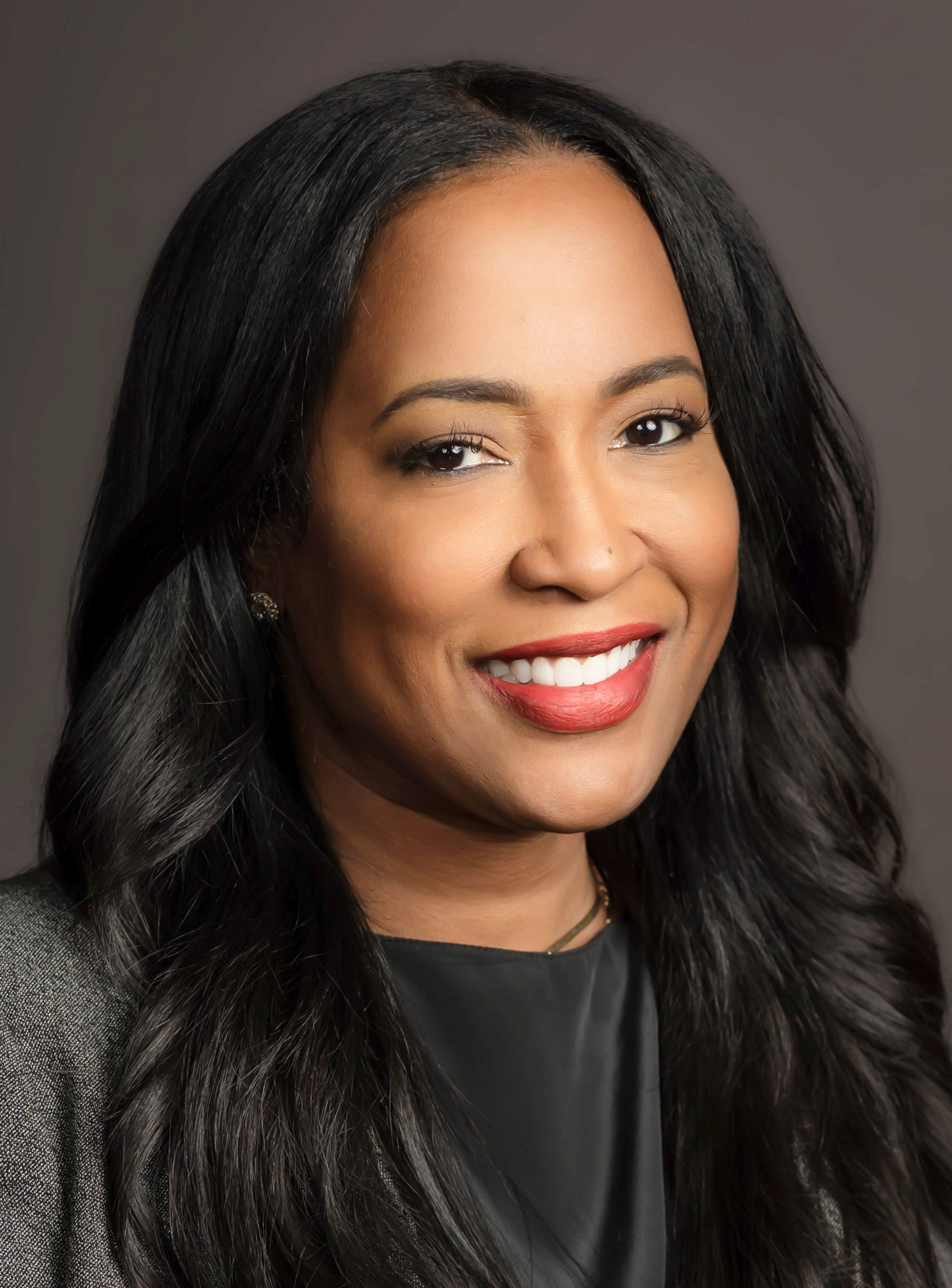

Nominee	Tanya Miller	Brian Strickland
Party	Democratic	Republican
Popular vote	2,320,270	1,856,943
Percentage	55.55%	44.45%
- Miller: 50–60% 60–70% 70–80% 80–90% >90% Strickland: 50–60% 60–70% 70–80% 80–90% >90%
Attorney General before election
Chris Carr
Republican
Elected Attorney General
Tanya Miller
Democratic

The 2026 Georgia Attorney General election was held on Tuesday, November 3, 2026, to elect the attorney general of Georgia. Two-term (Note: Carr was appointed attorney general in November 2016 following the resignation of Sam Olens, but was fully elected to two terms in 2018 and 2022.) incumbent Chris Carr declined to seek re-election, and instead ran unsuccessfully for governor. Democratic nominee Tanya F. Miller won the election, defeating Republican nominee Brian Strickland to become Georgia's first female attorney general.

== Republican primary ==
=== Candidates ===
==== Nominee ====
- Brian Strickland, state senator from the 17th district (2018–present)

==== Eliminated in primary ====
- Bill Cowsert, state senator from the 46th district (2007–present)

==== Declined ====
- Chris Carr, incumbent attorney general (2016–present) (ran for governor)

=== Fundraising ===
Campaign finance reports as of February 14, 2026
Candidate	Raised	Spent	Cash on hand
Bill Cowsert (R)	$912,135	$248,368	$657,135
Brian Strickland (R)	$1,030,563	$255,662	$915,872
Source: Georgia Campaign Finance Commission

=== Results ===
Primary results by county: Strickland: 50–60%; 60–70%; 70–80%; 80–90%; Cowsert: 60–70%

Republican primary
Party	Candidate	Votes	%
Republican	Brian Strickland	608,583	71.6
Republican	Bill Cowsert	241,382	28.4
Total votes		849,965	100.0

== Democratic primary ==
=== Candidates ===
==== Nominee ====
- Tanya Miller, state representative from the 62nd district (2023–present)

==== Eliminated in primary ====
- Bob Trammell, former minority leader of the Georgia House of Representatives (2017–2021) from the 132nd district (2015–2021)

=== Endorsements ===
Tanya Miller

Organizations

- EMILYs List
Bob Trammell

Organizations

- Georgia AFL-CIO

=== Fundraising ===
Campaign finance reports as of February 14, 2026
Candidate	Raised	Spent	Cash on hand
Tanya F. Miller (D)	$355,799	$69,175	$339,705
Bob Trammell (D)	$332,282	$88,532	$241,932
Source: Georgia Campaign Finance Commission

=== Results ===
Primary results by county: Miller: 60–70%; 70–80%; 80–90%; >90%

Democratic primary
Party	Candidate	Votes	%
Democratic	Tanya Miller	880,160	84.6
Democratic	Bob Trammell	160,852	15.4
Total votes		1,041,012	100.0

== General election ==
=== Post-primary endorsements ===
Tanya Miller (D)

Individuals

- Jane Fonda

Labor unions

- United Auto Workers

Organizations

- Everytown for Gun Safety
- Reproductive Freedom for All

=== Predictions ===
Source	Ranking	As of
Sabato's Crystal Ball	Tossup	October 29, 2026

=== Polling ===
Poll source	Date(s) administered	Sample size (Note: Key: A – all adults RV – registered voters LV – likely voters V – unclear)	Margin of error	Brian Strickland (R)	Tanya Miller (D)	Undecided
The Atlanta Journal-Constitution	October 7–15, 2026	1,000 (LV)	± 3.1%	44%	44%	—
Global Strategy Group (D) (Note: Poll sponsored by the Democratic Attorneys General Association.)	September 27 – October 1, 2026	TBA	± 3.5%	43%	46%	—

=== Results ===
2026 Georgia Attorney General election
Party	Candidate	Votes	%	±%
Republican	Brian Strickland			
Democratic	Tanya Miller			
Total votes			100.0	
Democratic gain from Republican				

== Notes ==
Partisan clients
