= Juanita Marsh =

American judge

Juanita D. Marsh
- Born: Sarah Juanita Daniel; December 4, 1926; Elberton, Georgia, U.S
- Died: February 9, 2013 (aged 86); Atlanta, Georgia, U.S.
- Education: University of Georgia (1946)
- Occupations: Judge, teacher
- Spouse: George Elliott Marsh Sr.

Juanita Daniel Marsh (December 4, 1926 – February 9, 2013) was an American judge. She earned her law degree taking night classes at the Woodrow Wilson College of Law and was admitted to the Georgia Bar in 1951. Marsh was appointed judge of College Park's municipal court in 1971, becoming the third female judge in Georgia's history.

== Early life ==
Sarah Juanita Daniel was born on December 4, 1926, to farmers E. R. "Bud" and Jessie Stratton Daniel in Elberton, Georgia. She had two siblings, Peggy and Marshall. After graduating at the top of her class at Centerville High School, she attended the University of Georgia on a full scholarship (1946, home economics) and studied at Teachers College, Columbia University.

== Career ==
After college, Marsh worked as a home demonstration agent in Statesboro. Following her marriage to George Marsh Sr., the family moved to Atlanta where Marsh and her husband took night classes at the Woodrow Wilson College of Law; in 1951 she was admitted to the Georgia Bar. She later began teaching at an elementary school and expected her career in law was over.

Marsh was appointed judge of College Park's municipal court by the city's mayor, Ralph Presley, in 1971, becoming only the third female judge in Georgia. She helped write a law manual for traffic court judges, and in 1979 she was a member of the Judicial Council of Georgia, where she was the only woman on the 24-member Judicial Planning Committee.

She founded Anchor Hospital in 1986; in 1990, Anchor was the center that helped rehabilitate pilot Lyle Prouse.

== Personal life and legacy ==
In December 1947, she married George Elliott Marsh Sr.; he died in 1989. They had four children: Brad, Blake, Sherry, and Elliott.

During her lifetime, Marsh received multiple recognitions and awards, including the WSB Radio 750 Award (1973), South Fulton's Influential Top 10 (1986), and the Elbert County Chamber's Native Citizen Award (2004). In 2020, Marsh was inducted into the Georgia Women of Achievement Hall of Fame.

Marsh died on February 9, 2013, at Piedmont Hospital, following a hip fracture and ensuing complications.
