= Georgia's 62nd House of Representatives district =

State district in Georgia, USA

Georgia's 62nd State House of Representatives district
Representative
Tanya F. Miller; D–Atlanta
- Demographics: 18.5% White; 75.4% Black; 3.4% Hispanic; 0.8% Asian
- Population: 60,521

District 62 elects one member of the Georgia House of Representatives. It contains parts of Fulton County.

== Members ==
- LaDawn Jones (2013–2017)
- William Boddie (2017–2023)
- Tanya F. Miller (2023–2027)
- Kenn Collier (since 2027)
