= David Jenkins (Georgia politician) =

American politician (born 1971)

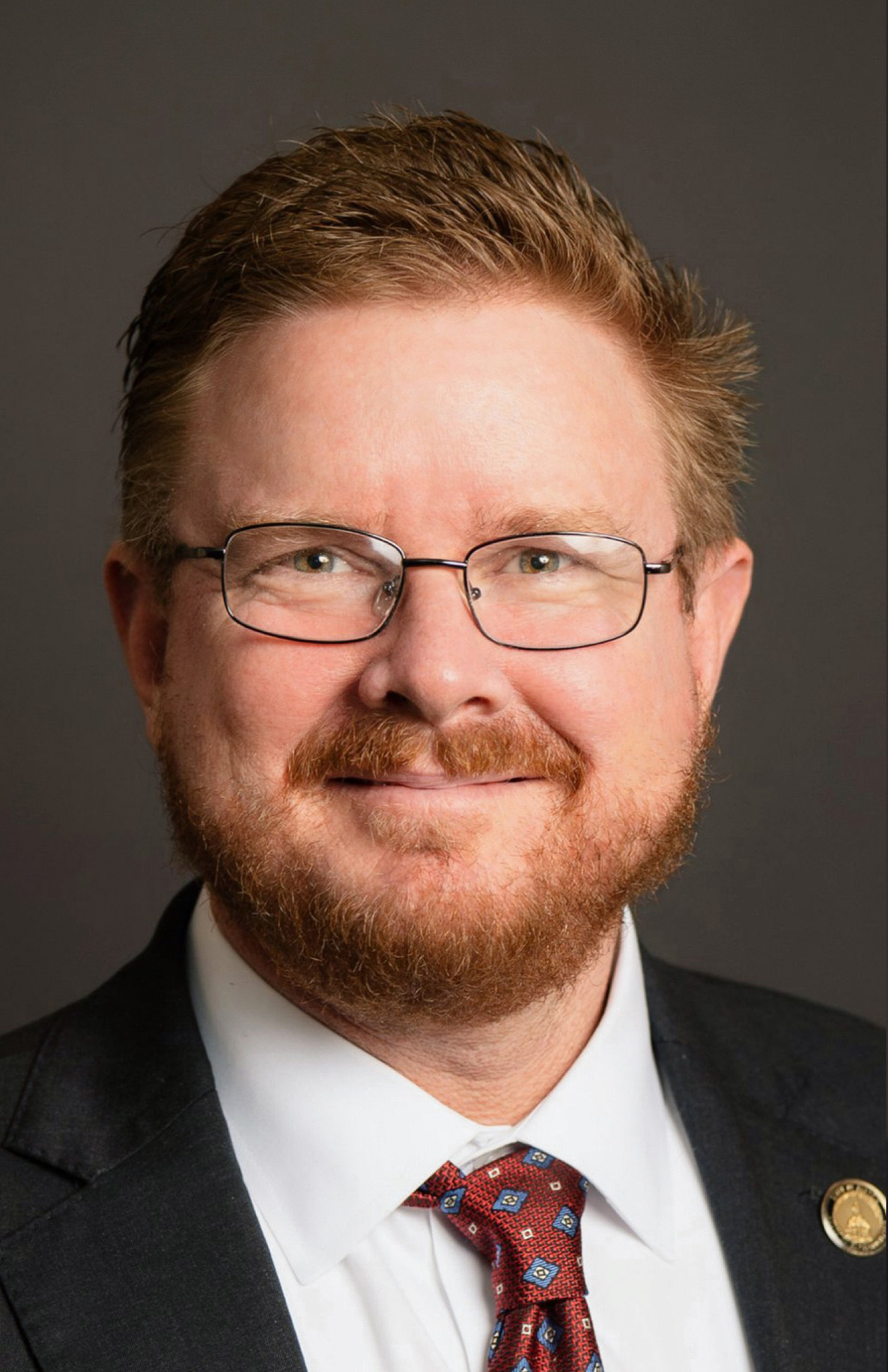
- Official headshot

Member of the Georgia House of Representatives
- Incumbent
- Assumed office January 11, 2021
- Preceded by: Bob Trammell
- Constituency: 132nd district (2021–2023); 136th district (2023–present)

Personal details
- Born: David Glenn Jenkins; March 7, 1971 (age 55)
- Party: Republican
- Spouse: Cat Jenkins
- Education: Embry-Riddle Aeronautical University (BS)

David Glenn Jenkins (born March 7, 1971) is an American politician, a helicopter pilot, and former police officer from Georgia. Jenkins is a Republican member of the Georgia House of Representatives for District 136.

== Education ==
In 2008, Jenkins earned a Bachelor’s Degree in Technical Management from Embry Riddle Aeronautical University.

== Career ==
Jenkins is a former Clayton County police officer. In early 2000 Jenkins started training to become a helicopter pilot in the United States Army. He graduated from Warrant Officer School and went on to serve with the 101st Airborne Division, nicknamed the "Screaming Eagles" at Fort Campbell, KY as a Chinook Pilot. Jenkins is now a life-flight helicopter pilot.

On November 3, 2020, Jenkins won the election and became a Republican member of Georgia House of Representatives for District 132. Jenkins defeated the Georgia Minority House Leader Bob Trammell.

Jenkins ran for the Republican nomination for Georgia's 3rd congressional district in 2024, but withdrew his candidacy prior to the primary election. He sought re-election to his state House seat, defeating primary challenger Mike Riesen with 64% of the vote. In the general election that year, Jenkins defeated Democratic challenger Jeff Lowe with 68% of the vote.

Jenkins has expressed opposition to gun regulation, support for premise liability reform.

== Personal life ==
Jenkins' wife is Catherine Jenkins. They live near Luthersville, on their farm, Jenkins Farms, in Meriwether County, Georgia.
