= Eugene Cook (Georgia judge) =

American judge

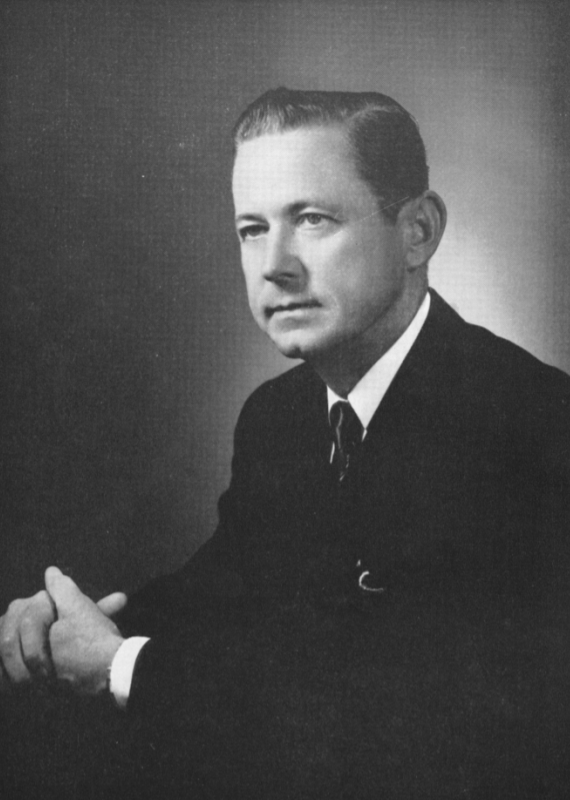

Associate Justice of the Supreme Court of Georgia
- In office 1965–1967
- Preceded by: Joseph Quillian
- Succeeded by: John E. Frankum

43rd Attorney General of Georgia
- In office 1945–1965
- Governor: Ellis Arnall; Herman Talmadge; Melvin E. Thompson; Marvin Griffin; Ernest Vandiver; Carl Sanders
- Preceded by: T. Grady Head
- Succeeded by: Arthur K. Bolton

Personal details
- Born: Eugene Cook; April 12, 1904
- Died: April 14, 1967 (aged 63) Atlanta, Georgia, U.S.
- Party: Democratic
- Occupation: Jurist

Eugene Cook (April 12, 1904 – April 14, 1967) was an American jurist who served as Attorney General of Georgia from 1945 to 1965, and as an associate justice of the Supreme Court of Georgia from 1965 to 1967.

Born in Wrightsville, Georgia, Cook attended the public schools and received his undergraduate degree from Mercer University, followed by a law degree from Mercer University Law School in 1927.

He was the Attorney General of Georgia from 1945 to 1965, and a justice of the Georgia Supreme Court. He believed the NAACP was a communist organization.

Despondent in the months following the death of his wife, Cook died of a self-inflicted gunshot wound while still serving on the court.

Party political offices
Preceded by T. Grady Head	Democratic nominee for Attorney General of Georgia; 1946, 1950, 1954, 1958, 1962	Succeeded by Arthur K. Bolton
Political offices
Preceded by T. Grady Head	Justice of the Supreme Court of Georgia; 1965–1967	Succeeded by John E. Frankum
