= T. Grady Head =

American judge (1897–1965)

Thomas Grady Head (August 4, 1897 – July 7, 1965) was the 42nd Attorney General of Georgia from 1943 to 1945, and an associate justice of the Supreme Court of Georgia from 1945 to 1965.

Head received his law degree from the Chattanooga College of Law. He was seen as a potential candidate for Governor of Georgia, but preferred an appointment to the state supreme court. Head was on the court during the three governors controversy.

Head died following brain surgery at the age of 67.

Political offices
Preceded by Warren Grice	Justice of the Supreme Court of Georgia; 1945–1965	Succeeded by Eugene Cook
Preceded by Ellis Arnall	Attorney General of Georgia; 1943–1945	Succeeded by Eugene Cook
