= Arthur K. Bolton =

Attorney General of Georgia from 1965 to 1981

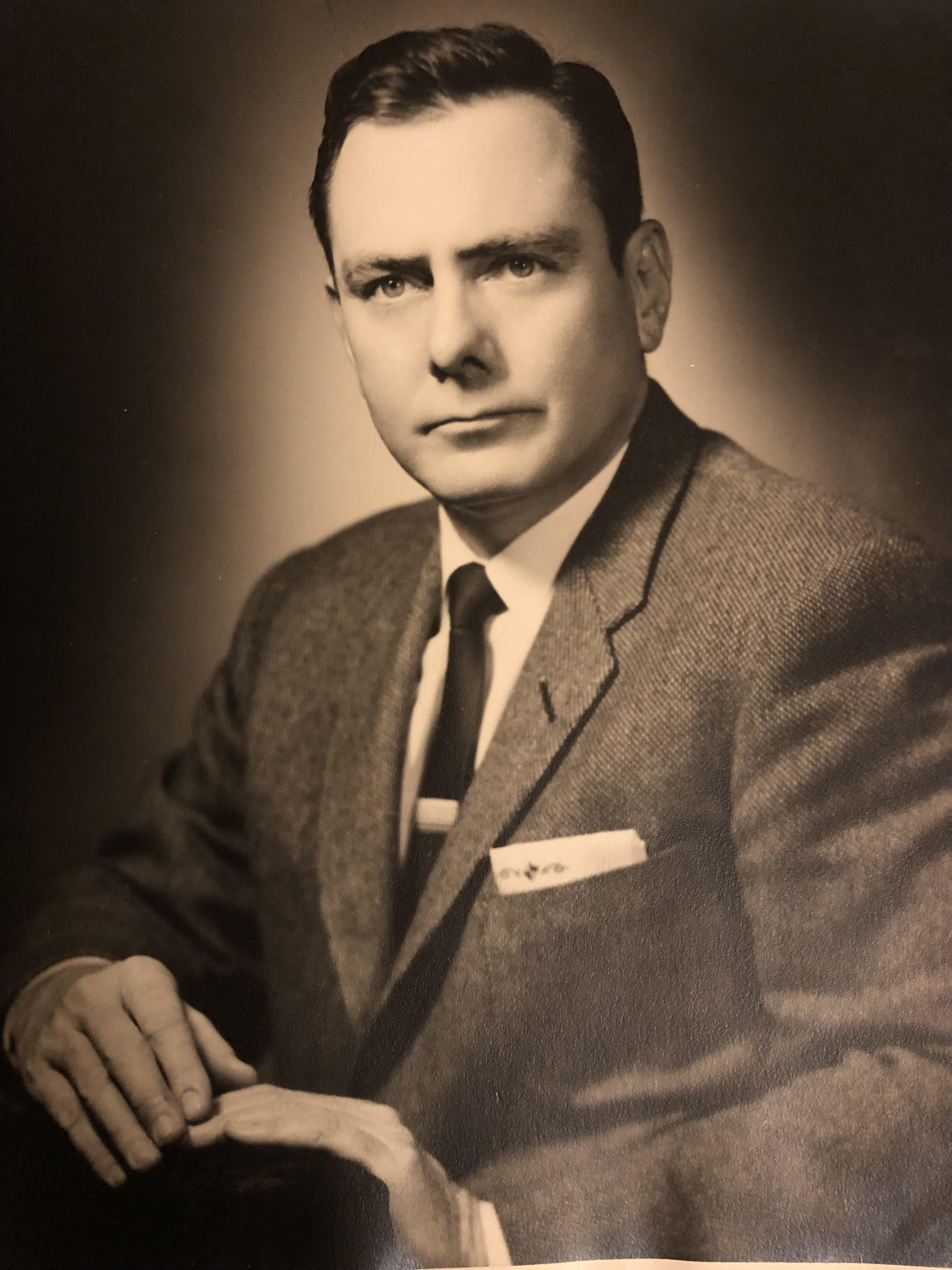

44th Attorney General of Georgia
- In office 1965–1981
- Governor: Carl Sanders; Lester Maddox; Jimmy Carter; George Busbee
- Preceded by: Eugene Cook
- Succeeded by: Mike Bowers

Member of the Georgia State House of Representatives
- In office 1949–1965

Personal details
- Born: Arthur Key Bolton; May 14, 1922 Griffin, Georgia, United States
- Died: December 1, 1997 (aged 75) Griffin, Georgia, United States
- Resting place: Oak Hill Cemetery, Griffin, Georgia, United States
- Party: Democratic
- Spouse(s): Marion Lee, Esther
- Children: Arthur Key Bolton Jr., Marian Lee Bolton Sorensen
- Education: North Georgia College; University of Georgia; University of Alabama
- Occupation: Lawyer

Military service
- Allegiance: United States
- Branch/service: United States Army
- Years of service: 1943–1946
- Rank: Captain

Arthur Key Bolton (May 14, 1922 – December 1, 1997) was the Attorney General of Georgia from 1965 through 1981. During his time as attorney general, he represented the state in a case challenging Georgia's abortion laws, Doe v. Bolton, which was decided by the U.S. Supreme Court on the same day as another more famous abortion case, Roe v. Wade. Bolton also served as a member of the Georgia House of Representatives from 1949 to 1965 and Judge of the Criminal Court of Griffin from 1952 to 1965.

== Early life ==
Arthur Key Bolton was born on May 14, 1922, in Griffin, Spalding County Georgia to Herbert Alfred Bolton and Eunice Blanton Maddox, descendants of residents of the state for at least three generations (a grandfather, John Marion Bolton, was born in South Carolina, was a Methodist circuit rider, and served in the Georgia militia.) He was the youngest of seven surviving children. Bolton attended public school, graduating from Spalding High with honors in 1939. He was president of his sophomore class, treasurer of his senior class, and elected Best All-Around Student in his senior year.

== Education ==
Bolton attended North Georgia College from 1939 to 1941, completed a bachelor of laws (LL.B.) degree at the University of Georgia in 1943, and also attended the University of Alabama.

== Military service ==
In 1943, Bolton attended the Officer Candidate School at Fort Benning, Georgia, and was commissioned as a second lieutenant in the U.S. Army infantry. He served in the European theater of World War II, and was wounded in action at a river crossing in Belgium on April 6, 1945. Bolton was awarded the Silver Star, the Purple Heart, and the European Theater of Operations ribbon with three campaign stars. He was separated from service in 1946 at the rank of captain.

== Political career ==
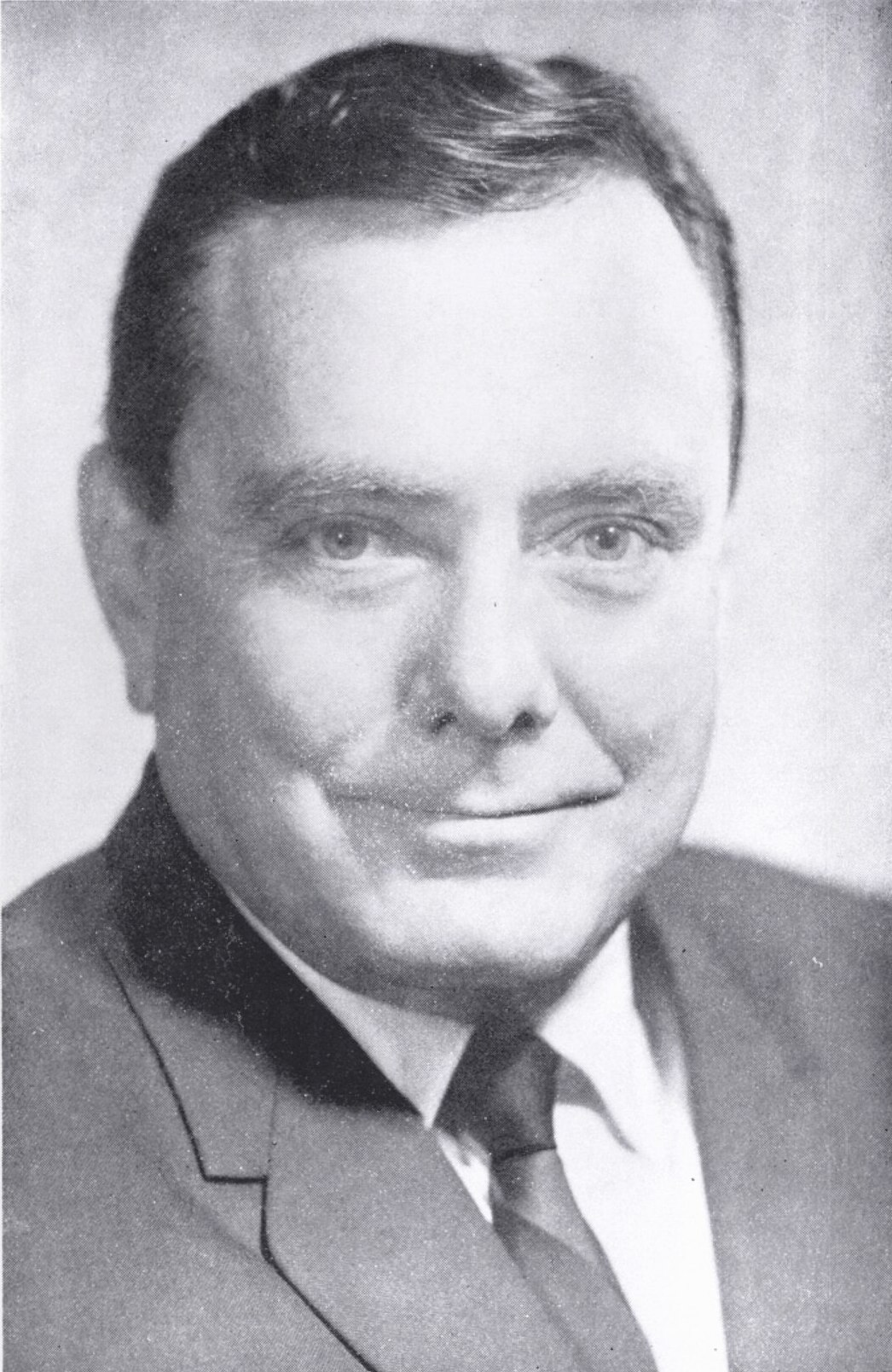
Official portrait, circa 1970s

Upon returning to Griffin after the war, Bolton started a law practice in 1947. In 1948, he ran for a seat in the Georgia House of Representatives from Spalding County, and was elected; he served in the state house from 1949 to 1965. On June 14, 1965, he was appointed as attorney general of Georgia by Gov. Carl Sanders; he subsequently was elected to the position in 1966, and served under Sanders, Lester Maddox, Jimmy Carter, and George Busbee. As attorney general, he gained a reputation for professionalizing the workings of the attorney general's office and combating corruption. He also represented Georgia as the respondent in Doe v. Bolton, a case challenging Georgia's abortion laws, that was decided by the United States Supreme Court in 1973 on the same day as the better-known Roe v. Wade. He resigned from office in 1981, citing health issues related to his military service.

== Death and burial ==
Bolton died on December 1, 1997, in Griffin, due to complications from his injuries in World War II. He was buried in Oak Hill Cemetery in Griffin.

Party political offices
Preceded by Eugene Cook	Democratic nominee for Attorney General of Georgia; 1966, 1970, 1974, 1978	Succeeded by Mike Bowers
Legal offices
Preceded by Eugene Cook	Attorney General of Georgia; 1965–1981	Succeeded by Mike Bowers
