= Atlanta Law School =

Private Law School in Atlanta, Georgia, US (1890–1994)

- Active: 1890–1994
- Founders: Hooper Alexander, Archibald H. Davis, Hamilton Douglas Sr., and Charles A. Read
- Postgraduates: 6,000 alumni
- Other students: Approved by the Georgia Bar Examiners to issue Bachelor of Laws, Juris Doctor and Master of Laws Degree
- Location: Atlanta, Georgia, United States

The Atlanta Law School was a private, non-profit night school founded in 1890 as the legal department of the Southern Medical School (now known as Emory University School of Medicine). Atlanta Law School faculty members were practicing lawyers and judges from across the state of Georgia. While the school originally focused on medical-related criminal and civil litigation, the curriculum eventually expanded to encompass all areas of law.

In 1988, Georgia law was amended to require American Bar Association (ABA) accreditation, a standard the Atlanta Law School could not meet due to the cost and space requirements of a large library. Consequently, the school, the third oldest in Georgia, was forced to cease operations and shut its doors.

== History ==
In 1890, Hamilton Douglas Sr., Hooper Alexander, Archibald H. Davis, and Charles A. Read, began night law classes for those who were unable to attend law classes during the day. It was incorporated under the laws of the State of Georgia in 1892.

From its founding, the instructors were always engaged in the practice of law, either as practitioners or as judges (sitting or retired). No professional teachers or instructors were engaged in the teaching process throughout the school's history. The character of the school was defined as a "Lawyer's Law School".

The original course of study covered two academic years of nine months each leading to the L.L.B. degree and admission to the bar without examination.

Atlanta Law School Campus

=== Cocking Affair ===
In 1941, the Cocking Affair led the Southern Association of Colleges and Schools (SACS) to withdraw accreditation from Georgia’s white public colleges due to political interference by Governor Eugene Talmadge. This loss of accreditation disqualified students from state professional licensing exams, prompting the Georgia Board of Regents to establish a public-private partnership with the Atlanta Law School. This agreement marked the first such contract in the state's history.

Under the partnership, University of Georgia law students attended classes at the Atlanta Law School to maintain their eligibility for the state bar exam. In exchange, Atlanta Law School students were granted access to the University of Georgia Law Library and permitted to attend specific university lectures and activities. This arrangement remained in place until accreditation was restored to the public university system in 1944.

=== Closing ===
In 1988, the State Bar of Georgia modified the requirements for bar admission, allowing only American Bar Association-accredited law school graduates to take the bar exam. This rule change affected the three night law schools in Georgia, including Atlanta Law School. Atlanta Law School trustees decided to close the school. The school closed its doors in 1994. Originally all State Accredited law school graduates had until December 1998 to take and pass the Georgia Bar Exam. This was later amended by the Georgia Supreme Court to allow John Marshall Law School to become provisionally ABA Accredited, and all Night Law School graduates were not limited in taking the bar exam after 1998. Today the school continues as a scholarship fund for those students who would not otherwise have the opportunity to practice law.

== Notable alumni ==
Members of the Georgia judiciary, state legislature, and business owners received their legal training at the school. Atlanta's first female lawyer, Minnie Hale Daniel was a graduate of Atlanta Law School in 1911. Helen Douglas Mankin who would later become Georgia's first woman member of Congress received her LL.B. from Atlanta Law School in 1920. Judge Juanita Marsh attended in the 1940s–50s. Other alumni include Federal Reserve Chairman Eugene Robert Black, former New York City Councilman and Congressional nominee Domenic Recchia, Atlanta trial attorney Don Keenan, Judge David Ray Moore, Judge working in Fayette County Magistrate Court, State Court and Superior Court, former Georgia State Representative Chesley V. Morton, Georgia Supreme Court Justices John E. Frankum, and Charles S. Reid, and U.S. District Court Judge Frank A. Hooper, Jr. (who also taught at the school).

White supremacist lawyer and convicted bomber J. B. Stoner received a law degree from the school in 1952. He went on to defend James Earl Ray and men accused of bombing the home 6-year-old Donal Godfrey.

== Notable faculty ==
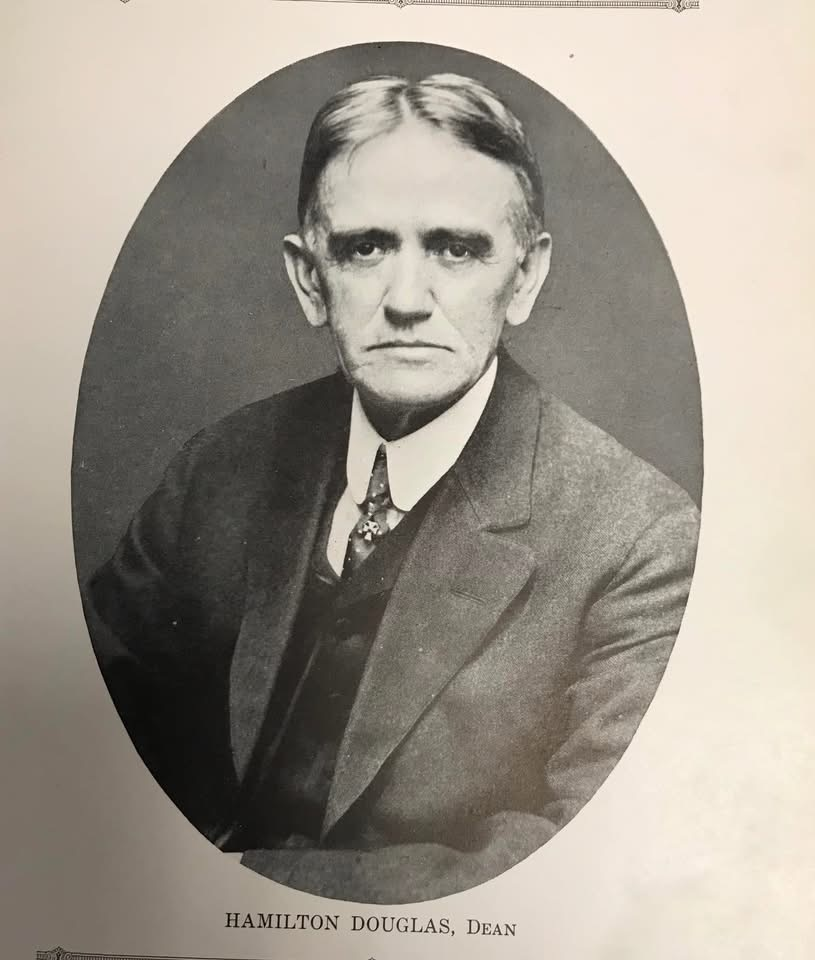

The late Hamilton Douglas, Sr., served as dean of the law school. His son Hamilton Douglas, Jr. continued the school until Herschel E Cole became the last dean of the school. Donald W. Gettle served as assistant dean for the last thirty years of the school's existence. Robert E. Cochran, II was named an assistant dean in 1985. The board of trustees included Herschel E. Cole, chairman, Charles W. Allen, Donald W. Gettle, E. Lewis Hansen (1985). Dean Virlin Moore and Dean Wayne C. Pressley were also quite involved throughout the transition of Woodrow Wilson College of Law.

== See also ==
- List of defunct law schools in the United States
