= Chattanooga College of Law =

Law school in Tennessee, US (1898–1942)

The Chattanooga College of Law was a law school in Chattanooga, Tennessee, from 1898 to 1942.

The school began as the law department of Grant University (which later became the University of Tennessee at Chattanooga). The first graduate of the school during its existence as a department was Nathan L. Bachman, who went on to become a United States Senator. In 1906 it was reported that "the new building of the Chattanooga College of Law is one of the finest buildings in the South, located on the block immediately opposite the United States Court House".

In 1910, the university decided to discontinue its professional departments, and the dean of the law school, Charles R. Evans, persuaded the state to grant it a charter as an independent institution. Evans died shortly thereafter, and the deanship was then assumed by local judge W. B. Swaney, who remained in that position for many years. The American Bar Association reported in 1912 that "the Chattanooga College of Law has fifteen instructors, and not one of the number devotes his entire time to the school", and a 1915 description noted that the faculty generally came "from the bench and bar of Chattanooga", and were active practitioners in the law.

The school was never accredited by the American Bar Association, and ceased accepting new students in 1942, several years after legislation was passed by the state requiring increased standards for the admission of students to enter law schools in the state. A 1943 article noted that the school, though still in operation, "enters a new term soon, without a single first year student for the first time in its 45 years of operation". Other notable alumni of the school included T. Grady Head, who served as Attorney General of Georgia, and on the Georgia Supreme Court.

== See also ==
- List of defunct law schools in the United States
