= James Beverly =

American politician from Georgia

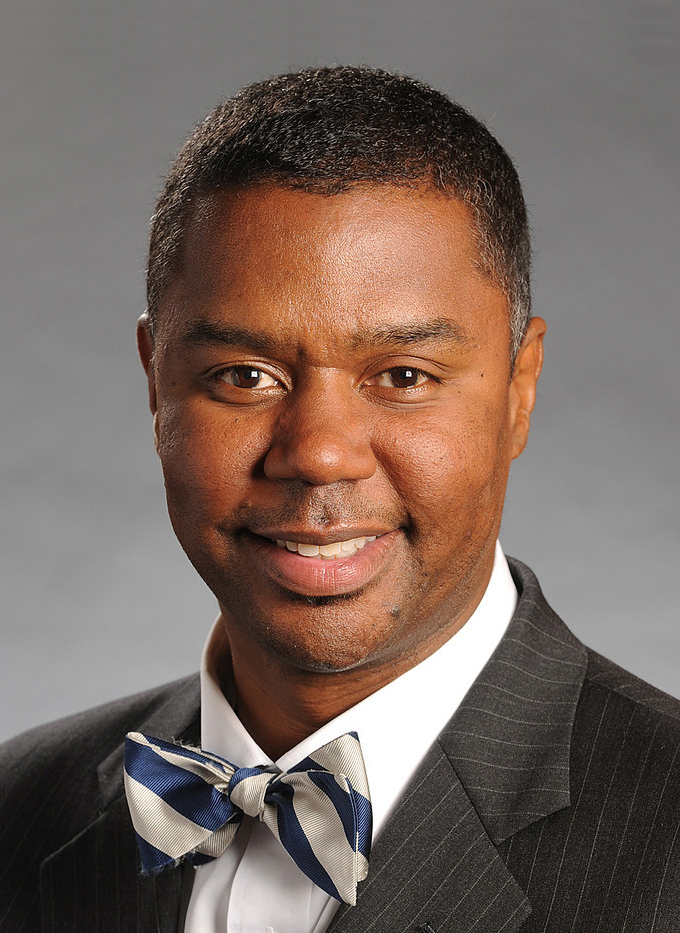

Minority Leader of the Georgia House of Representatives
- In office January 11, 2021 – January 13, 2025
- Preceded by: Bob Trammell
- Succeeded by: Carolyn Hugley

Member of the Georgia House of Representatives
- In office August 3, 2011 – January 13, 2025
- Preceded by: David Lucas
- Succeeded by: Anissa Jones
- Constituency: 139th district (2011–2013); 143rd district (2013–2025)

Personal details
- Born: James Theodore Beverly; September 28, 1968 (age 57)
- Party: Democratic
- Education: Guilford College (BS); Pennsylvania College of Optometry (OD); Wesleyan College (MBA); Harvard University (MPA)

James Theodore Beverly (born September 28, 1968) is an American politician from the state of Georgia. A member of the Democratic Party, Beverly represented the 143rd district in the Georgia House of Representatives from 2013 to 2025. He served as the chamber's Minority Leader for the last four years of his time in the legislature.

== Education ==
Beverly earned a B.S. in Biology from Guilford College in 1990 and a doctorate in optometry from the Pennsylvania College of Optometry in 1994. He later earned an MBA from Wesleyan College in Macon, Georgia in 2006 and an MPA from the Harvard Kennedy School of Government in 2010.

== Political career ==
Beverly won a House seat in a 2011 special election. Beverly served on the Health and Human Services, Retirement, Small Business Development, and Special Rules committees.

The first bill Beverly proposed would have expanded the tax credit for companies that create jobs in poor neighborhoods.

Beverly was chosen as the House Minority Leader in November 2020, after former leader Bob Trammell lost re-election to the House.

After a December 2023 session approved a new map of state districts, Beverly's new district included large portions of Houston County. He chose not to run for re-election.

Georgia House of Representatives
Preceded by Bob Trammell	Minority Leader of the Georgia House of Representatives; 2021–2025	Succeeded by Carolyn Hugley
