= George M. Napier =

American politician

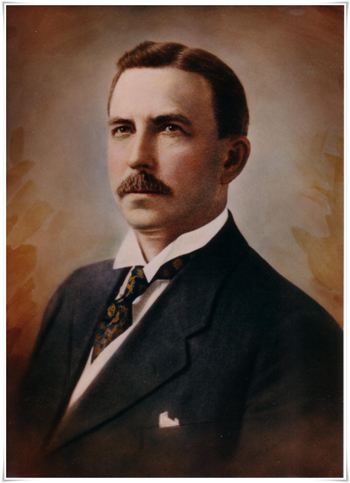
Portrait of George M Napier circa 1911-1912

George Moultrie Napier (March 28, 1863 – May 4, 1932) was an Attorney General of Georgia (1921–1932) and a Grand Master of the Freemasons (1911–1912).

Born in Walker County, Georgia, Napier attended the public schools of his home county, and received an A.B. from North Georgia Agricultural College in 1882. He moved to Monroe, Georgia, and worked for a time as a newspaper editor and a court reporter, also reading law during this time before receiving an M.A. from the University of Georgia in 1898. He then served in the Spanish–American War, after which he relocated to Atlanta, Georgia, to practice law.

Napier died from a stroke while having breakfast in his home, at the age of 69.
