= Lyle Prouse =

Airline pilot and addiction rehabilitation counselor (born 1938)

Norman Lyle Prouse (born September 29, 1938) is a retired United States airline pilot, U.S. Marine Corps Vietnam veteran, addiction rehabilitation counselor, and author. He received national news attention in March 1990 when he was arrested and faced charges relating to flying a Boeing 727 while intoxicated, after serving as captain of Northwest Airlines Flight 650. After being released from prison, he re-earned the requisite pilot's licenses and ratings and was able to regain employment with Northwest and later retired as a Boeing 747 captain for the airline. Prouse later received a presidential pardon from U.S. President Bill Clinton in 2001.

== Early years ==
Born in Wichita, Kansas, the son of Vernon and Louise Prouse, Lyle Prouse later entered the United States Marine Corps, served in Vietnam, and was hired to Northwest Airlines.

== Northwest Flight 650 ==
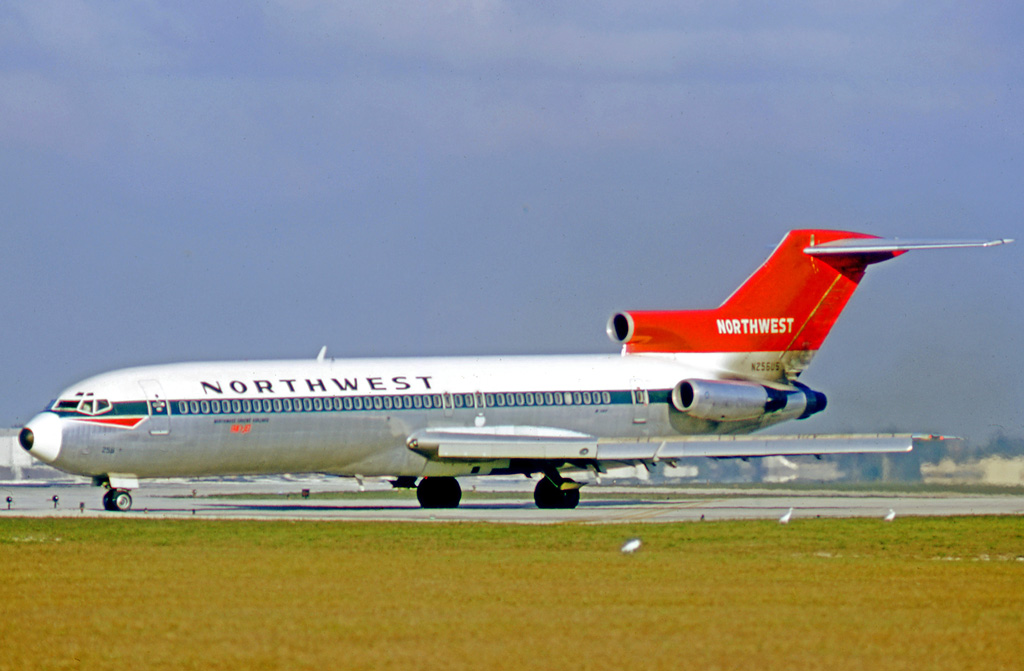
A Northwest Boeing 727-251.

On the morning of March 8, 1990, Prouse served as a captain aboard Northwest Flight 650, carrying 58 passengers from Fargo, to Minneapolis-Saint Paul on a Boeing 727. Although the flight terminated without incident, the blood alcohol content of the pilots was measured two hours after landing, and exceeded the level permitted by the Federal Aviation Regulations. The three pilots had been drinking together at the Speak Easy restaurant the previous evening. Despite receiving an anonymous telephone tip, the FAA failed to intervene, and allowed the pilots to take off. All three pilots were later arrested, including 51 year old Prouse, 36 year old first officer Robert Kirchner, and 35 year old flight engineer Joseph Balzer.

In a court hearing that followed, Captain Prouse received a 16-month prison sentence, and the other two pilots each received 12 month sentences. The FAA also revoked the licenses of the pilots.

== Aftermath ==
Prouse entered an alcohol rehabilitation program immediately after his arrest, and reformed during his 16-month prison sentence, volunteering to help others dealing with addiction.

Despite being stripped of all of his pilot certifications, Prouse was determined to return to flying. He got re-certificated as a pilot, starting at the bottom, with a Private Pilot license, and with the support of his loyal friends and fellow pilots, he was eventually able to return to work for Northwest Airlines.

Prouse' autobiographical story titled "Grounded: Alcohol clipped this pilot’s wings until sobriety and hard work brought him back to the sky" was added to the "Big Book" of Alcoholics Anonymous in the personal stories section sub-heading "They Lost Nearly All" which features stories of those suffering the most dire consequences of the disease of Alcoholism.

== Later life ==
Prouse retired from Northwest Airlines in September 1998. He later received a presidential pardon from U.S. President Bill Clinton in 2001.

In 2011 he published an autobiography and account of his time with Northwest entitled Final Approach: Northwest Airlines Flight 650, Tragedy and Triumph.
