= Pappenheimer Mansion =

Former mansion in Atlanta, Georgia

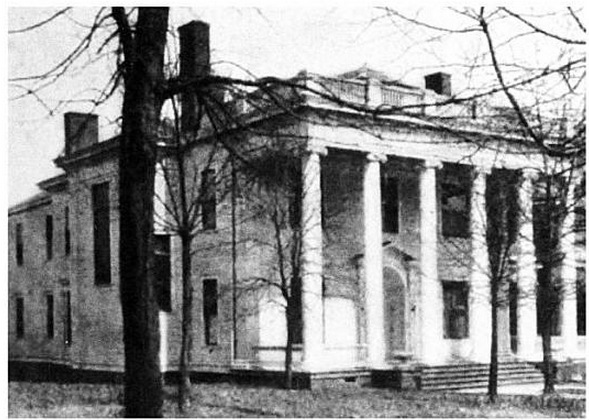
- Pappenheimer Mansion

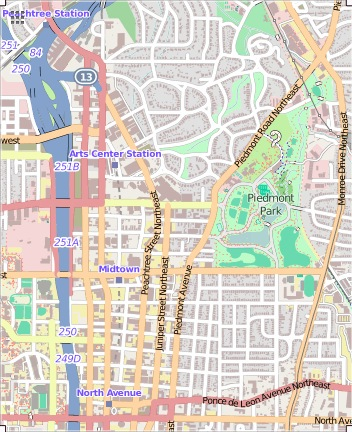
- Location within Atlanta Midtown Pappenheimer Mansion (Atlanta) Pappenheimer Mansion (Georgia) Pappenheimer Mansion (the United States)

General information
- Type: Private residence (ca. 1914-1930s); fraternity house (1930s); Hospital (1940s-1988)
- Location: 144 Ponce de Leon Avenue NE, Midtown Atlanta, Georgia, United States
- Coordinates: 33.7727°N 84.3826°W
- Opened: ca. 1914
- Demolished: 1999

The Pappenheimer Mansion, later the Ponce de Leon Infirmary, then Midtown Hospital, was located at 144 Ponce de Leon Avenue NE in Midtown Atlanta, on the north side between Piedmont and Juniper streets. Furniture magnate Oscar Pappenheimer (1861-1917) built his first house on the site around 1900, which burned down in 1914. Pappenheimer rebuilt almost immediately, including a famous music room which contained a pipe organ as well as two grand pianos.

Interest in classical music waned in the 1890s through 1910s and Pappenheimer was credited as being one of the sole forces encouraging the performance of chamber music in Atlanta. For more than three decades, informal concerts were given in his music room.

== History ==
The Pappenheimer family lived in the house until the 1930s, after which the house was used as a fraternity house for Georgia Tech students.

By 1941 it had become an ear, nose and throat hospital called the Ponce de Leon Infirmary, founded by Dr. Murdock Equen.

In 1977 it became Midtown Hospital, which specialized in second trimester abortions, performing the largest number of abortions of any institution in the state, more than 7000 in 1996. By the 1980s conditions in the hospital had deteriorated, conditions had become overcrowded and unsanitary and in 1988 the State of Georgia closed it.

The mansion was demolished in 1999 and the Marq on Ponce apartment complex now occupies the site.
