= Georgia Attorney General =

Chief law enforcement officer and lawyer in the U.S. state of Georgia

Attorney General of Georgia
- State flag

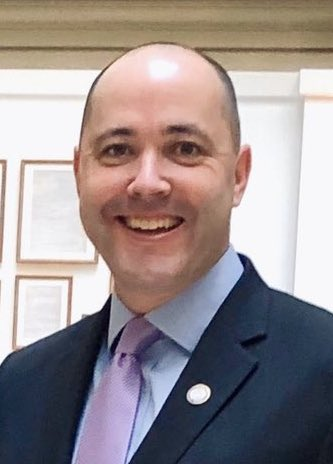
- Incumbent; Chris Carr since November 1, 2016
- Georgia Department of Law
- Type: Chief law enforcement officer
- Reports to: Governor of Georgia
- Term length: Four years, no limit
- Constituting instrument: Constitution of Georgia
- Formation: 1754
- First holder: William Clifton
- Website: law.ga.gov

The attorney general of Georgia is a statewide elected attorney and legal advisor for the executive branch of the U.S. state of Georgia. They are a constitutional officer responsible for providing opinions on legal questions concerning the state, prosecuting public corruption cases, overseeing contracts on behalf of the state, representing the state in all civil cases, in all capital felony appeals, in all cases appearing before the Supreme Court of the United States, and leading the Georgia Department of Law. They may also initiate civil or criminal actions on behalf of the State of Georgia when requested to do so by the governor.

The office dates back to Georgia's colonial history, with the first attorney general, William Clifton, being appointed by King George II in 1754. The attorney general is elected to a four-year term at the same time as elections are held for governor of Georgia and other offices.

The current attorney general of Georgia is Christopher M. Carr. Carr was appointed by Governor Nathan Deal following the resignation of Sam Olens, who was officially appointed to the office of president of Kennesaw State University on November 1, 2016. Carr completed Olens' unexpired term, which expired in January 2019. Carr was re-elected to a four-year term in Georgia's 2018 statewide elections and was reelected in the 2022 elections. Democratic nominee Tanya Miller will succeed Carr following the results of the 2026 election.

== History ==
The office of attorney general originated during Georgia's royal colony period. The prominent English attorney William Clifton was appointed as the first "attorney for the State" by King George II in 1754. Clifton served in this position until 1764, and until 1777 continued to be appointed by the king. The office was officially established in the state's first constitution of 1777, where it was referenced as one of the officers which should be present in front of the Supreme Court of Georgia when it was sitting. In this Constitution, if the attorney for the State was not present, the justices collectively appointed a new one pro tempore for that session.

The name of "attorney general" was first constitutionally referenced in the constitution of 1789. The constitution of 1868 first officially established the office and term, designating it as an appointed office.^{:23} The constitution of 1877 subsequently established the office as an elective position, and synchronized its term with that of the Governor.

The Georgia Department of Law was officially established by the Georgia General Assembly in 1931 to assist the attorney general in their duties. It was also given the jurisdiction to handle all "matters of law relating to every department of the State other than the Judicial and Legislative branches thereof." Interestingly, the act also prohibited state agencies and boards from employing their own counsel. The department was also tasked with assisting the General Assembly with all legal matters until 1959, when the legislature established the Office of Legislative Counsel.

In modern times, the office of the attorney general has a much more constrained jurisdiction, with a large function of the office being in providing legal advice through official and unofficial opinions. The office does still take over investigations and prosecution efforts when deemed of special importance.

== Qualifications and Term ==
Article V, Section III, Paragraph I, of the Constitution of Georgia establishes the elected nature of the office, and its four year term of office. Paragraph II provides that, to be eligible for the office of attorney general, an individual needs to meet the following qualifications:

- Have been a citizen of the United States for the past 10 years;
- Have been a legal resident of Georgia for 4 years;
- Be at least 25 years old;
- Take the oath of office; and
- Have been an active-status member of the State Bar of Georgia for 7 years.

== Duties and Powers ==
Article V, Section III, Paragraph IV, of the Constitution of Georgia provides that "[t]he Attorney General shall act as the legal advisor of the executive department, shall represent the state in the Supreme Court in all capital felonies and in all civil and criminal cases in any court when required by the Governor, and shall perform such other duties as shall be required by law." According the statute, the general duties of the attorney general are as follows:

- Give his opinion, in writing, on any question of law connected with the interest of the state or with the duties of any of the departments;
- When necessary, prepare all contracts and writings in relation to any matter in which the state is interested;
- Appear on behalf of the State in the prosecution of a district attorney; and
- Perform all other duties as required by law.

The attorney general is also given the authority to:

- Employ private counsel for executive departments and agencies;
- Start investigations into any executive department or agency;
- Administer oaths and issue subpoenas in regards to official investigations of executive departments and agencies; and
- Appoint or contract attorneys to assist in carrying out their duties.

As is established by law, the attorney general cannot investigate or issue subpoenas against any member of the General Assembly while it is in session, and can be investigated by the Governor or General Assembly.

== List of attorneys general, 1754–present ==
=== Pre-statehood ===
#	Image	Name	Term of service
1		William Clifton	1754–1764
2		Charles Pryce	1764–1776
3		Williams Stephens	1776–1780
4		John Milledge	1780–1781
5		Samuel Stirk	1781–1785
6		Nathaniel Pendleton	1785–1786
7		Matthew McAllister	1787–1788

=== Post-statehood ===
#	Image	Name	Term of service	Political party
7		Matthew McAllister	1788–1791	
8		George Walker	1792–1795	
9		David Brydie Mitchell	1796–1806	Democratic-Republican
10		Robert Walker	1807–1808	
11		John Hamil	1808	
12		John Forsyth	1808–1811	Democratic-Republican
13		Alexander M. Allen	1811	
14		Richard H. Wilde	1811–1813	Democratic-Republican
15		Alexander M. Allen	1813–1816	
16		Roger Lawson Gamble	1816–1822	
17		Thomas F. Wells	1822–1827	
18		George W. Crawford	1827–1831	Whig
19		Charles Jones Jenkins	1831–1834	Democratic
20		Ebenezer Starnes	1834–1840	
21		James Gardner	1840–1843	
22		John J. R. Flournoy	1843–1847	
23		Alpheus Colvard	1847–1851	
24		John Troup Shewmake	1851–1855	
25		William R. McLaws	1855–1859	
26		Alpheus M. Rogers	1859–1861	
27		Winder P. Johnson	1861	
28		William Watts Montgomery	1861–1865	
29		George T. Barnes	1865–1866	Democratic
30		John Philpot Curren Whitehead	1866–1868	
31		Henry P. Farrow	1868–1872	Republican
32		Nathaniel Job Hammond	1872–1877	Democratic
33		Robert N. Ely	1877–1880	Democratic
34		Clifford Anderson	1880–1890	Democratic
35		George N. Lester	1890–1891	Democratic
36		William A. Little	1891–1892	Democratic
37		Joseph M. Terrell	1892–1902	Democratic
38		Boykin Wright	1902	Democratic
39		John C. Hart	1902–1910	Democratic
40		Hewlett A. Hall	1910–1911	Democratic
41		Thomas S. Felder	1911–1914	Democratic
42		Warren Grice	1914–1915	Democratic
43		Clifford Walker	1915–1920	Democratic
44		R. A. Denny	1920–1921	Democratic
45		George M. Napier	1921–1932	Democratic
46		Lawrence S. Camp	1932	Democratic
47		M. J. Yeomans	1933–1939	Democratic
48		Ellis G. Arnall	1939–1943	Democratic
49		T. Grady Head	1943–1945	Democratic
50		Eugene Cook	1945–1965	Democratic
51		Arthur K. Bolton	1965–1981	Democratic
52		Michael J. Bowers	1981–1997	Democratic (1981–94)/Republican (1994–97)
53		Thurbert Baker	1997–2011	Democratic
54		Sam Olens	2011–2016	Republican
55		Chris Carr	2016–present	Republican
56		Tanya Miller	Attorney General-elect takes office January 2027	Democratic
