= 1990 United States House of Representatives elections in Georgia =

- November 3, 1990

All ten Georgia seats to the United States House of Representatives
	Majority party	Minority party
Party	Democratic	Republican
Last election	9	1
Seats won	9	1
Seat change	Steady	Steady

Democratic
50–60%
60–70%
70–80%
80–90%
Republican
50–60%
60–70%

The 1990 House elections in Georgia occurred on November 3, 1990 to elect the members of the State of Georgia's delegation to the United States House of Representatives. Georgia had ten seats in the House, apportioned according to the 1980 United States census. These elections were held concurrently with the United States Senate elections of 1990 (including one election in Georgia), the United States House elections in other states, and various state and local elections.

== Overview ==
United States House of Representatives elections in Georgia, 1990
Party	Votes	Percentage	Seats before	Seats after	+/–
Democratic	854,784	61.33	9	9	±0
Republican	538,865	38.67	1	1	±0
Others	0	0.0%	0	0	
Valid votes	-	-%			
Invalid or blank votes	-	-%			
Totals	1,393,649	100.00%	10	10	-
Voter turnout					

=== Results ===
District	Incumbent	Party	Elected	Status	Opponent
Georgia 1	Robert Lindsay Thomas	Democratic	1982	Re-elected	Robert Lindsay Thomas (D) 71.2% Chris Meredith (R) 28.8%
Georgia 2	Charles Floyd Hatcher	Democratic	1980	Re-elected	Charles Floyd Hatcher (D) 73.0% Jonathan Perry Waters (R) 27.0%
Georgia 3	Richard Ray	Democratic	1982	Re-elected	Richard Ray (D) 63.2% Paul Broun (R) 36.8%
Georgia 4	Ben L. Jones	Democratic	1988	Re-elected	Ben L. Jones (D) 52.4% John Linder (R) 47.6%
Georgia 5	John Lewis	Democratic	1986	Re-elected	John Lewis (D) 75.6% J.W. Tibbs (R) 24.4%
Georgia 6	Newt Gingrich	Republican	1978	Re-elected	Newt Gingrich (R) 50.3% David Worley (D) 49.7%
Georgia 7	George Darden	Democratic	1983	Re-elected	George Darden (D) 60.1% Al Beverly (R) 39.9%
Georgia 8	J. Roy Rowland	Democratic	1982	Re-elected	J. Roy Rowland (D) 68.7% Bob Cunningham (R) 31.3%
Georgia 9	Ed Jenkins	Democratic	1976	Re-elected	Ed Jenkins (D) 55.8% Joe Hoffman (R) 44.2%
Georgia 10	Doug Barnard, Jr.	Democratic	1976	Re-elected	Doug Barnard, Jr. (D) 58.3% Sam Jones (R) 41.7%
