= 1992 United States House of Representatives elections in Georgia =

- November 3, 1992

All 11 Georgia seats to the United States House of Representatives
	Majority party	Minority party
Party	Democratic	Republican
Last election	9	1
Seats won	7	4
Seat change	▼2	▲3
Democratic
50–60%
60–70%
70–80%
80–90%
Republican
50–60%
60–70%

The 1992 House elections in Georgia occurred on November 3, 1992 to elect the members of the State of Georgia's delegation to the United States House of Representatives. Georgia had eleven seats in the House, apportioned according to the 1990 United States census.

These elections were held concurrently with the United States Senate elections of 1992 (including one election in Georgia), the United States House elections in other states, and various state and local elections.

Prior to the elections, Georgia's House delegation consisted of nine Democrats and one Republican. As a result of the 1990 United States census, Georgia picked up an additional seat for the 1992 U.S. House elections. Two new districts were made, one based in Gwinnett County and another that stretched from Atlanta to Savannah (the predecessors of the modern seventh and fourth districts respectively). In addition Doug Barnard, Jr. and Ben L. Jones were drawn into the same district.

The Democratic-controlled Georgia General Assembly under the leadership of fiercely partisan Speaker of the House Tom Murphy specifically targeted Gingrich, heavily altering the district that Gingrich represented. Gerrymandering split Gingrich's territory among three neighboring districts. Much of the southern portion of Gingrich's district, including his home in Carrollton, was drawn into the Columbus-based 3rd District, represented by five-term Democrat Richard Ray. At the same time, the Assembly created a new, heavily Republican 6th District in Fulton and Cobb counties in the wealthy northern suburbs of Atlanta—-an area that Gingrich had never represented.

However, Democrats attempt at defeating Gingrich ultimately backfired. Gingrich sold his home in Carrollton and moved to Marietta in the new 6th. He subsequently won a heated primary over state Representative Herman Clark and remained in the House of Representatives until 1999. The changes made to Ray's district, which became considerably more urban and Republican than his old territory, contributed to his defeat in the fall to state senator Mac Collins. As of 2026, this is the last election in which Democrats won a majority of congressional districts in Georgia, and the last time they won the house popular vote until 2026.

== Overview ==
United States House of Representatives elections in Georgia, 1992
Party	Votes	Percentage	Seats before	Seats after	+/–
Democratic	1,214,792	54.87	9	7	-2
Republican	999,182	45.13	1	4	+3
Others	0	0.0%	0	0	
Valid votes	-	-%			
Invalid or blank votes	-	-%			
Totals	2,213,974	100.00%	10	11	+1
Voter turnout					

=== Results ===
District	Incumbent	Party	First elected	Result	Candidates
Georgia 1	Robert Lindsay Thomas	Democratic	1982	Retired; Republican gain	Jack Kingston (R) 57.8% Barbara Christmas (D) 42.2%
Georgia 2	Charles Floyd Hatcher	Democratic	1980	Lost renomination Democratic hold	Sanford Bishop (D) 63.7% John Clayton (R) 36.3%
Georgia 3	Richard Ray	Democratic	1982	Lost re-election Republican gain	Mac Collins (R) 54.8% Richard Ray (D) 45.2%
Georgia 4	None (district created)			New seat Republican gain	John Linder (R) 50.5% Cathy Steinberg (D) 49.5%
Georgia 5	John Lewis	Democratic	1986	Re-elected	John Lewis (D) 72.1% Paul Stabler (R) 27.9%
Georgia 6	Newt Gingrich	Republican	1978	Re-elected	Newt Gingrich (R) 57.7% Tony Center (D) 42.3%
Georgia 7	George Darden	Democratic	1983	Re-elected	George Darden (D) 57.3% Al Beverly (R) 42.7%
Georgia 8	J. Roy Rowland	Democratic	1982	Re-elected	J. Roy Rowland (D) 55.7% Bob Cunningham (R) 44.3%
Georgia 9	Ed Jenkins	Democratic	1976	Retired; Democratic hold	Nathan Deal (D) 59.2% Daniel Becker (R) 40.8%
Georgia 10	Doug Barnard, Jr.	Democratic	1976	Retired; Democratic loss	
Georgia 10	Ben L. Jones	Democratic	1988; Redistricted from the 4th district	Lost renomination Democratic hold	Don Johnson (D) 53.8% Ralph Hudgens (R) 46.2%
Georgia 11	None (district created)			New seat Democratic gain	Cynthia McKinney (D) 73.1% Woodrow Lovett (R) 26.9%

== See also ==
- United States House of Representatives elections, 1992
