= Georgia's 9th congressional district =

U.S. House district for Georgia

Coordinates: 34°30′22″N 83°41′13″W

- Interactive map of district boundaries since January 3, 2025
- Representative: Andrew Clyde; R–Athens
- Distribution: 57.32% rural; 42.68% urban
- Population (2025): 858,633
- Median household income: $89,363
- Ethnicity: 60.9% White; 16.1% Hispanic; 11.9% Black; 6.8% Asian; 3.6% Two or more races; 0.7% other
- Cook PVI: R+17

Georgia's 9th congressional district is a congressional district in the north of the U.S. state of Georgia. The district is represented by Republican Andrew Clyde, who succeeded fellow Republican Doug Collins. The district is mostly rural and exurban in character, though it stretches into Hall (home to the district's largest city, Gainesville) and Gwinnett counties on Atlanta's northern fringe.

The district has a heavy Republican lean. Donald Trump carried the district with almost 78 percent of the vote in 2016, his fourth-best showing in the nation. With a Cook Partisan Voting Index of R+17, it is one of the most Republican districts in Georgia. The district swung rapidly into the Republican column after then-congressman and future governor Nathan Deal switched parties in 1995. Since then, only two Democrats running in the district have crossed the 30 percent mark, 2024 and 2026.

Republicans are no less dominant at the state and local level. It was one of the first areas of Georgia where old-line Southern Democrats began splitting their tickets in federal elections. Despite this, even as the district turned increasingly Republican at the national level (Jimmy Carter is the only Democratic presidential candidate to carry the district since 1960), conservative Democrats still held most local offices well into the 1990s. However, after Deal's party switch, Republicans gradually eroded the Democratic advantage, with the help of other party switchers. By the early 21st century, there were almost no elected Democrats left above the county level.

Much of this district was the 10th district from 2003 to 2007; it became the 9th once again in a mid-decade redistricting.

Four-term Republican Doug Collins announced in January 2020 that he would run for U.S. senator. Collins placed third in the race, behind incumbent Kelly Loeffler and her Democratic opponent Raphael Warnock.

== Past counties in the district ==
=== 2003–2013 ===
- Catoosa
- Dade
- Dawson
- Fannin
- Forsyth (Partial, see also 7th district)
- Gilmer
- Gordon (Partial, see also 11th district)
- Habersham
- Hall
- Jackson
- Lumpkin
- Murray
- Pickens
- Union
- White
- Walker
- Whitfield

=== 2013–2023 ===
- Banks
- Clarke (Partial, see also 10th district)
- Dawson
- Elbert
- Fannin
- Forsyth (Partial, see also 7th district)
- Franklin
- Gilmer
- Gwinnett
- Habersham
- Hall
- Hart
- Jackson
- Lumpkin
- Madison
- Pickens (Partial)
- Rabun
- Stephens
- Towns
- Union
- White

== Counties and communities ==
For the 119th and successive Congresses (based on the districts drawn following a 2023 court order), the district contains all or portions of the following counties and communities.

Banks County (7)

All seven communities

Fannin County (5)

All five communities

Hall County (7)

Braselton (part; also 10th; shared with Barrow, Gwinnett, and Jackson counties), Clermont, Flowery Branch (part; also 7th), Gainesville (part; also 7th), Gillsville (shared with Banks County), Lula (shared with Banks County), Oakwood (part; also 7th)

Gilmer County (3)

All three communities

Gwinnett County (8)

Auburn (part; also 10th), Buford (part; also 7th; shared with Hall County), Braselton (part; also 10th; shared with Barrow, Hall, and Jackson counties), Dacula (part; also 10th), Lawrenceville (part; also 13th), Rest Haven (part; also 7th; shared with Hall County), Sugar Hill, Suwanee (part; also 4th)

Habersham County (8)

All eight communities

Jackson County (9)

All nine communities

Rabun County (6)

All six communities

Stephens County (3)

All three communities

Towns County (3)

All three communities

Union County (1)

Blairsville

== Recent election results from statewide races ==
Year	Office	Results
2008	President	McCain 70% - 29%
2012	President	Romney 74% - 26%
2016	President	Trump 69% - 28%
2016	Senate	Isakson 70% - 25%
2018	Governor	Kemp 68% - 31%
2018	Lt. Governor	Duncan 69% - 31%
2018	Attorney General	Carr 69% - 31%
2020	President	Trump 65% - 33%
2021	Senate (Reg.)	Perdue 66% - 34%
2021	Senate (Spec.)	Loeffler 66% - 34%
2022	Senate	Walker 66% - 34%
2022	Governor	Kemp 71% - 28%
2022	Lt. Governor	Jones 69% - 29%
2022	Secretary of State	Raffensperger 69% - 27%
2022	Attorney General	Carr 69% - 29%
2024	President	Trump 67% - 33%

== List of members representing the district ==
Member	Party	Years	Cong ress	Electoral history	District map
District created March 4, 1873
Hiram P. Bell (Cumming)	Democratic	March 4, 1873 – March 3, 1875	43rd	Elected in 1872. [data missing]	
Vacant		March 3, 1875 – May 5, 1875	44th	Garnett McMillan (D) was elected in 1874 but died January 14, 1875.	
Benjamin H. Hill (Atlanta)	Democratic	May 5, 1875 – March 3, 1877	44th	Elected to finish McMillan's term. Re-elected in 1876. Resigned when elected U.S. senator.	
Vacant		March 3, 1877 – March 13, 1877	45th		
Hiram P. Bell (Cumming)	Democratic	March 13, 1877 – March 3, 1879	45th	Elected to finish Hill's term. Lost re-election.	
Emory Speer (Athens)	Independent Democratic	March 4, 1879 – March 3, 1883	46th 47th	Elected in 1878. Re-elected in 1880. [data missing]	
Allen D. Candler (Gainesville)	Democratic	March 4, 1883 – March 3, 1891	48th 49th 50th 51st	Elected in 1882. Re-elected in 1884. Re-elected in 1886. Re-elected in 1888. [data missing]	
Thomas E. Winn (Lawrenceville)	Democratic	March 4, 1891 – March 3, 1893	52nd	Elected in 1890. [data missing]	
Farish C. Tate (Jasper)	Democratic	March 4, 1893 – March 3, 1905	53rd 54th 55th 56th 57th 58th	Elected in 1892. Re-elected in 1894. Re-elected in 1896. Re-elected in 1898. Re-elected in 1900. Re-elected in 1902. [data missing]	
Thomas M. Bell (Gainesville)	Democratic	March 4, 1905 – March 3, 1931	59th 60th 61st 62nd 63rd 64th 65th 66th 67th 68th 69th 70th 71st	Elected in 1904. Re-elected in 1906. Re-elected in 1908. Re-elected in 1910. Re-elected in 1912. Re-elected in 1914. Re-elected in 1916. Re-elected in 1918. Re-elected in 1920. Re-elected in 1922. Re-elected in 1924. Re-elected in 1926. Re-elected in 1928. Lost renomination.	
John S. Wood (Canton)	Democratic	March 4, 1931 – January 3, 1935	72nd 73rd	Elected in 1930. Re-elected in 1932. Lost renomination.	
B. Frank Whelchel (Gainesville)	Democratic	January 3, 1935 – January 3, 1945	74th 75th 76th 77th 78th	Elected in 1934. Re-elected in 1936. Re-elected in 1938. Re-elected in 1940. Re-elected in 1942. [data missing]	
John S. Wood (Canton)	Democratic	January 3, 1945 – January 3, 1953	79th 80th 81st 82nd	Elected in 1944. Re-elected in 1946. Re-elected in 1948. Re-elected in 1950. [data missing]	
Phillip M. Landrum (Jasper)	Democratic	January 3, 1953 – January 3, 1977	83rd 84th 85th 86th 87th 88th 89th 90th 91st 92nd 93rd 94th	Elected in 1952. Re-elected in 1954. Re-elected in 1956. Re-elected in 1958. Re-elected in 1960. Re-elected in 1962. Re-elected in 1964. Re-elected in 1966. Re-elected in 1968. Re-elected in 1970. Re-elected in 1972. Re-elected in 1974. [data missing]	
Ed Jenkins (Jasper)	Democratic	January 3, 1977 – January 3, 1993	95th 96th 97th 98th 99th 100th 101st 102nd	Elected in 1976. Re-elected in 1978. Re-elected in 1980. Re-elected in 1982. Re-elected in 1984. Re-elected in 1986. Re-elected in 1988. Re-elected in 1990. [data missing]	
Nathan Deal (Clermont)	Democratic	January 3, 1993 – April 10, 1995	103rd 104th 105th 106th 107th	Elected in 1992. Re-elected in 1994. Re-elected in 1996. Re-elected in 1998. Re-elected in 2000. Redistricted to the 10th district.	
Nathan Deal (Clermont)	Republican	April 10, 1995 – January 3, 2003	103rd 104th 105th 106th 107th	Elected in 1992. Re-elected in 1994. Re-elected in 1996. Re-elected in 1998. Re-elected in 2000. Redistricted to the 10th district.	
Charlie Norwood (Evans)	Republican	January 3, 2003 – January 3, 2007	108th 109th	Redistricted from the 10th district and re-elected in 2002. Re-elected in 2004. Redistricted to the 10th district.	2003–2007
Nathan Deal (Gainesville)	Republican	January 3, 2007 – March 21, 2010	110th 111th	Redistricted from the 10th district and re-elected in 2006. Re-elected in 2008. Resigned to run for Governor of Georgia.	2007–2013
Vacant		March 21, 2010 – June 8, 2010	111th		2007–2013
Tom Graves (Ranger)	Republican	June 8, 2010 – January 3, 2013	111th 112th	Elected to finish Deal's term. Re-elected in 2010. Redistricted to the 14th district.	2007–2013
Doug Collins (Gainesville)	Republican	January 3, 2013 – January 3, 2021	113th 114th 115th 116th	Elected in 2012. Re-elected in 2014. Re-elected in 2016. Re-elected in 2018. Retired to run for U.S. Senator.	2013–2023
Andrew Clyde (Athens)	Republican	January 3, 2021 – present	117th 118th 119th	Elected in 2020. Re-elected in 2022. Re-elected in 2024. Re-elected in 2026.	2013–2023
Andrew Clyde (Athens)	Republican	January 3, 2021 – present	117th 118th 119th	Elected in 2020. Re-elected in 2022. Re-elected in 2024. Re-elected in 2026.	2023–2025
Andrew Clyde (Athens)	Republican	January 3, 2021 – present	117th 118th 119th	Elected in 2020. Re-elected in 2022. Re-elected in 2024. Re-elected in 2026.	2025–present

== Election results ==
=== 2006 ===
Georgia's 9th Congressional District Election (2006)
Party	Candidate	Votes	%
Republican	Nathan Deal (Incumbent)	128,685	76.63
Democratic	John Bradbury	39,240	23.37
Total votes		167,925	100.00
Turnout			
Republican hold			

=== 2008 ===
Georgia's 9th Congressional District Election (2008)
Party	Candidate	Votes	%
Republican	Nathan Deal (Incumbent)	217,493	75.51
Democratic	Jeff Scott	70,537	24.49
Total votes		288,030	100.00
Turnout			
Republican hold			

=== 2010 special election ===
Nathan Deal resigned March 21, 2010 to run for Governor of Georgia. A special election was held on June 8, 2010.

Georgia's 9th Congressional District Special Election (June 2010)
Party	Candidate	Votes	%
Republican	Tom Graves	22,694	56.4
Republican	Lee Hawkins	17,509	43.6
Total votes		40,203	100.00
Turnout			
Republican hold			

=== 2010 general election ===
Georgia's 9th Congressional District Election (2010)
Party	Candidate	Votes	%
Republican	Tom Graves (Incumbent)	173,512	100.00
Total votes		173,512	100.00
Turnout			
Republican hold			

=== 2012 ===
Following redistricting, Tom Graves moved to the newly created 14th district.

Georgia's 9th Congressional District Election (2012)
Party	Candidate	Votes	%
Republican	Doug Collins	192,101	76.18
Democratic	Jody Cooley	60,052	23.82
Total votes		252,153	100.00
Turnout			
Republican win (new seat)			

=== 2014 ===
Georgia's 9th Congressional District Election (2014)
Party	Candidate	Votes	%
Republican	Doug Collins (incumbent)	146,059	80.67
Democratic	David Vogel	34,988	19.33
Total votes		181,047	100.00
Turnout			
Republican hold			

=== 2016 ===
Georgia's 9th Congressional District Election (2016)
Party	Candidate	Votes	%
Republican	Doug Collins (incumbent)	256,535	100.00
Total votes		256,535	100.00
Turnout			
Republican hold			

=== 2018 ===
Georgia's 9th Congressional District Election (2018)
Party	Candidate	Votes	%
Republican	Doug Collins (incumbent)	224,412	79.51
Democratic	Josh McCall	57,823	20.49
Total votes		282,235	100.00
Turnout			
Republican hold			

=== 2020 ===
Georgia's 9th Congressional District Election (2020)
Party	Candidate	Votes	%
Republican	Andrew Clyde	292,750	78.58
Democratic	Devin Pandy	79,797	21.42
Total votes		372,547	100.00
Republican hold			

=== 2022 ===
Georgia's 9th Congressional District Election (2022)
Party	Candidate	Votes	%
Republican	Andrew Clyde (incumbent)	212,820	72.35
Democratic	Michael Ford	81,318	27.65
Total votes		294,138	100.00
Republican hold			

=== 2024 ===
Georgia's 9th Congressional District Election (2024)
Party	Candidate	Votes	%
Republican	Andrew Clyde (incumbent)	271,062	69.00
Democratic	Tambrei Cash	121,754	31.00
Total votes		392,816	100.00
Republican hold			

== See also ==
- Georgia's congressional districts
- List of United States congressional districts
