= Jack Brinkley =

American politician (1930–2019)

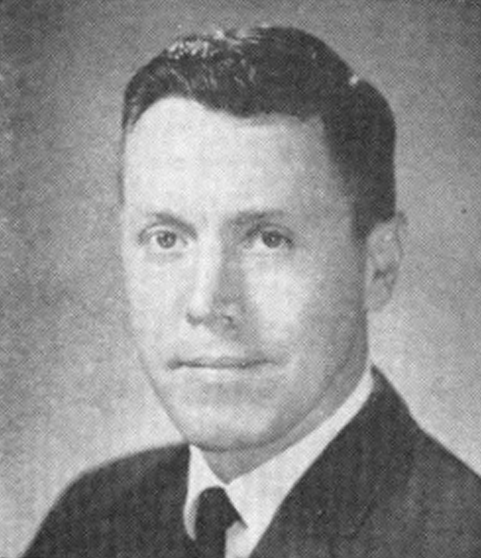

Member of the U.S. House of Representatives from Georgia's 3rd district
- In office January 3, 1967 – January 3, 1983
- Preceded by: Bo Callaway
- Succeeded by: Richard Ray

Member of the Georgia House of Representatives
- In office 1965–1966

Personal details
- Born: December 22, 1930 Faceville, Georgia, U.S.
- Died: January 23, 2019 (aged 88) Columbus, Georgia, U.S.
- Party: Democratic
- Education: University of Georgia

Military service
- Allegiance: United States
- Branch/service: United States Air Force
- Years of service: 1951-1955

Jack Thomas Brinkley (December 22, 1930 – January 23, 2019) was an American politician, educator and lawyer. He served as a Democratic member for the 3rd district of Georgia of the United States House of Representatives.

== Early life ==
Brinkley was born in Faceville, Georgia. After graduating from Young Harris College in 1949, Brinkley became a school teacher for several years before serving as a pilot in the United States Air Force from 1951 to 1956. After his military service, Brinkley entered the University of Georgia School of Law in Athens, graduated with a Juris Doctor degree in 1959, and became a practicing lawyer in Columbus, Georgia.

Brinkley's political career consisted of one term in the Georgia House of Representatives from 1965 to 1966 and eight consecutive terms in the U.S. House of Representatives beginning in 1967 and ending in 1983 when he chose not to run for re-election.

Following his retirement, he relocated to Columbus, Georgia. Brinkley died on January 23, 2019, at the age of 88.

U.S. House of Representatives
Preceded by Bo Callaway	Member of the U.S. House of Representatives from Georgia's 3rd congressional district January 3, 1967 – January 3, 1983	Succeeded by Richard Ray
