= 1994 United States House of Representatives elections in Georgia =

- November 8, 1994

All 11 Georgia seats to the United States House of Representatives
	Majority party	Minority party
Party	Republican	Democratic
Last election	4	7
Seats won	7	4
Seat change	▲3	▼3
Republican
50–60%
60–70%
70–80%
80–90%
Democratic
50–60%
60–70%
70–80%
Tie
50%

The 1994 House elections in Georgia occurred on November 8, 1994, to elect the members of the State of Georgia's delegation to the United States House of Representatives. Georgia had eleven seats in the House, apportioned according to the 1990 United States census.

These elections were held concurrently with the United States Senate elections of 1994, the United States House elections in other states, and various state and local elections.

Despite the fact that Bill Clinton had won Georgia's electoral votes in the Presidential election of 1992 two years prior, Republicans capitalized on the unpopularity of Clinton's and Congressional Democrats' major initiatives, most notably the Clinton health care plan of 1993 and gun control measures as well as miscellaneous disputes regarding social issues to gain three House seats from Democrats. In doing so, Republicans held a majority of the seats of Georgia's delegation to the U.S. House of Representatives for the first time since Reconstruction. Republicans would gain an additional seat when Nathan Deal (GA-9) changed his political affiliation in April 1995.

== Overview ==
United States House of Representatives elections in Georgia, 1994
Party	Votes	Percentage	Seats before	Seats after	+/–
Republican	816,484	54.522%	4	7	+3
Democratic	681,051	45.478%	7	4	-3
Others	0	0.0%	0	0	
Valid votes	-	-%			
Invalid or blank votes	-	-%			
Totals	1,497,535	100.00%	11	11	-
Voter turnout					

== Results ==
District	Incumbent	Party	Elected	Status	Opponent
Georgia 1	Jack Kingston	Republican	1992	Re-elected	Jack Kingston (R) 76.6% Raymond Beckworth (D) 23.4%
Georgia 2	Sanford Bishop	Democratic	1992	Re-elected	Sanford Bishop (D) 66.2% John Clayton (R) 33.8%
Georgia 3	Mac Collins	Republican	1992	Re-elected	Mac Collins (R) 65.5% Fred Overby (D) 34.5%
Georgia 4	John Linder	Republican	1992	Re-elected	John Linder (R) 57.9% Comer Yates (D) 42.1%
Georgia 5	John Lewis	Democratic	1986	Re-elected	John Lewis (D) 69.1% Dale Dixon (R) 30.9%
Georgia 6	Newt Gingrich	Republican	1978	Re-elected	Newt Gingrich (R) 64.2% Ben L. Jones (D) 35.8%
Georgia 7	George Darden	Democratic	1983	Defeated	Bob Barr (R) 51.9% George Darden (D) 48.1%
Georgia 8	J. Roy Rowland	Democratic	1982	Retired; Republican victory	Saxby Chambliss (R) 62.7% Craig Mathis (D) 37.3%
Georgia 9	Nathan Deal	Democratic	1992	Re-elected	Nathan Deal (D) 57.9% Robert L. Castello (R) 42.1%
Georgia 10	Don Johnson	Democratic	1992	Defeated	Charlie Norwood (R) 65.2% Don Johnson (D) 34.8%
Georgia 11	Cynthia McKinney	Democratic	1992	Re-elected	Cynthia McKinney (D) 65.6% Woodrow Lovett (R) 34.4%
