= Georgia's 7th congressional district =

U.S. House district for Georgia

Coordinates: 34°02′24″N 84°05′00″W

- Interactive map of district boundaries since January 3, 2025
- Representative: Rich McCormick; R–Roswell
- Distribution: 99.55% urban; 0.45% rural
- Population (2025): 817,070
- Median household income: $129,698
- Ethnicity: 63.7% White; 13.5% Asian; 10.2% Hispanic; 7.7% Black; 4.0% Two or more races; 0.8% other
- Cook PVI: R+11

Georgia's 7th congressional district is a congressional district in the U.S. state of Georgia. It is currently represented by Republican Rich McCormick.

The district includes portions of the north Atlanta metropolitan area, including the cities of Alpharetta, Cumming, Dahlonega, Dawsonville, Johns Creek, Milton, Roswell, and Sandy Springs. It covers parts of Cherokee, Fulton, and Hall counties and all of Dawson, Forsyth, and Lumpkin counties.

From 2013 to 2023, the district included most of Gwinnett County and portions of Forsyth County.

Although the seat had been held by Republicans from 1995 until 2021, the 7th district had previously elected Democrats consistently from the Reconstruction era (1868) until the 1994 Congressional Elections. The district has recently become friendlier to Democrats as a result of significant demographic changes, particularly the growth of Black, Hispanic and Asian populations. In the 2018 midterm elections, Republican Rob Woodall won reelection by only 433 votes, or 0.15%, against Democrat Carolyn Bourdeaux, and his victory was only confirmed after a recount. In terms of both absolute numbers and vote percentage, it was the closest U.S. House race in the country in 2018. In 2020, Bourdeaux was elected to represent the district in Congress.

== Recent election results from statewide races ==
Year	Office	Results
2008	President	McCain 68% - 31%
2012	President	Romney 73% - 27%
2016	President	Trump 63% - 33%
2016	Senate	Isakson 68% - 26%
2018	Governor	Kemp 62% - 36%
2018	Lt. Governor	Duncan 64% - 36%
2018	Attorney General	Carr 64% - 36%
2020	President	Trump 59% - 40%
2021	Senate (Reg.)	Perdue 61% - 39%
2021	Senate (Spec.)	Loeffler 61% - 39%
2022	Senate	Walker 59% - 41%
2022	Governor	Kemp 66% - 33%
2022	Lt. Governor	Jones 63% - 35%
2022	Secretary of State	Raffensperger 65% - 31%
2022	Attorney General	Carr 63% - 35%
2024	President	Trump 60% - 38%

== Composition ==
For the 119th and successive Congresses (based on the districts drawn following a 2023 court order), the district contains all or portions of the following counties and communities.

Cherokee County (3)

Ball Ground, Holly Springs (part; also 11th), Nelson (part; also 11th; shared with Pickens County)

Dawson County (1)

Dawsonville

Forsyth County (1)

Cumming

Fulton County (6)

Alpharetta, Johns Creek, Milton, Mountain Park (part; also 11th; shared with Cherokee County), Roswell, Sandy Springs (part; also 6th)

Hall County (5)

Buford (part; also 9th; shared with Gwinnett County), Flowery Branch (part; also 9th), Gainesville (part; also 9th), Rest Haven (part; also 9th; shared with Gwinnett County), Oakwood (part; also 9th)

Lumpkin County (1)

Dahlonega

== Demographics ==
According to the APM Research Lab's Voter Profile Tools (featuring the U.S. Census Bureau's 2019 American Community Survey), the district contained about 502,000 potential voters (citizens, age 18+). Of these, 52% are White, 24% Black, 12% Asian, and 10% Latino. More than one-fifth (21%) of the district's potential voters are immigrants. The median income among households (with one or more potential voter) in the district is about $85,800. As for the educational attainment of potential voters in the district, 44% hold a bachelor's or higher degree.

== List of members representing the district ==
Member	Party	Years	Cong ress	Electoral history	District location
District created March 4, 1827
John Floyd (Jefferson)	Jacksonian	March 4, 1827 – March 3, 1829	20th	Elected in 1826. [data missing]	1827–1829 [data missing]
District inactive		March 4, 1829 – March 3, 1845	21st 22nd 23rd 24th 25th 26th 27th 28th	Georgia only used at-large districts.	
Alexander H. Stephens (Crawfordville)	Whig	March 4, 1845 – March 3, 1851	29th 30th 31st 32nd	Redistricted from the at-large district and re-elected in 1844. Re-elected in 1846. Re-elected in 1848. Re-elected in 1851. Redistricted to the 8th district.	1845–1853 [data missing]
Alexander H. Stephens (Crawfordville)	Constitutional Union	March 4, 1851 – March 3, 1853	29th 30th 31st 32nd	Redistricted from the at-large district and re-elected in 1844. Re-elected in 1846. Re-elected in 1848. Re-elected in 1851. Redistricted to the 8th district.	1845–1853 [data missing]
David A. Reese (Monticello)	Whig	March 4, 1853 – March 3, 1855	33rd	Elected in 1853. [data missing]	1853–1863 [data missing]
Nathaniel G. Foster (Madison)	Know Nothing	March 4, 1855 – March 3, 1857	34th	Elected in 1855. [data missing]	1853–1863 [data missing]
Joshua Hill (Madison)	Know Nothing	March 4, 1857 – March 3, 1859	35th 36th	Elected in 1857. Re-elected in 1859. Resigned.	1853–1863 [data missing]
Joshua Hill (Madison)	Opposition	March 4, 1859 – January 23, 1861	35th 36th	Elected in 1857. Re-elected in 1859. Resigned.	1853–1863 [data missing]
Vacant		January 23, 1861 – July 25, 1868	36th 37th 38th 39th 40th	Civil War and Reconstruction	
Pierce M. B. Young (Cartersville)	Democratic	July 25, 1868 – March 3, 1869	40th	[data missing] Re-elected in 1868 but not permitted to qualify.	1868–1873 [data missing]
Vacant		March 4, 1869 – December 22, 1870	41st		1868–1873 [data missing]
Pierce M. B. Young (Cartersville)	Democratic	December 22, 1870 – March 3, 1875	41st 42nd 43rd	Elected to finish his own term. Re-elected in 1870. Re-elected in 1872. [data missing]	1868–1873 [data missing]
Pierce M. B. Young (Cartersville)	Democratic	December 22, 1870 – March 3, 1875	41st 42nd 43rd	Elected to finish his own term. Re-elected in 1870. Re-elected in 1872. [data missing]	1873–1883 [data missing]
William H. Felton (Cartersville)	Independent; Democratic	March 4, 1875 – March 3, 1881	44th 45th 46th	Elected in 1874. Re-elected in 1876. Re-elected in 1878. [data missing]	1873–1883 [data missing]
Judson C. Clements (Rome)	Democratic	March 4, 1881 – March 3, 1891	47th 48th 49th 50th 51st	Elected in 1880. Re-elected in 1882. Re-elected in 1884. Re-elected in 1886. Re-elected in 1888. [data missing]	1873–1883 [data missing]
Judson C. Clements (Rome)	Democratic	March 4, 1881 – March 3, 1891	47th 48th 49th 50th 51st	Elected in 1880. Re-elected in 1882. Re-elected in 1884. Re-elected in 1886. Re-elected in 1888. [data missing]	1883–1893 [data missing]
Robert W. Everett (Fish)	Democratic	March 4, 1891 – March 3, 1893	52nd	Elected in 1890. [data missing]	1883–1893 [data missing]
John W. Maddox (Rome)	Democratic	March 4, 1893 – March 3, 1905	53rd 54th 55th 56th 57th 58th	Elected in 1892. Re-elected in 1894. Re-elected in 1896. Re-elected in 1898. Re-elected in 1900. Re-elected in 1902. [data missing]	1893–1903 [data missing]
John W. Maddox (Rome)	Democratic	March 4, 1893 – March 3, 1905	53rd 54th 55th 56th 57th 58th	Elected in 1892. Re-elected in 1894. Re-elected in 1896. Re-elected in 1898. Re-elected in 1900. Re-elected in 1902. [data missing]	1903–1913 [data missing]
Gordon Lee (Chickamauga)	Democratic	March 4, 1905 – March 3, 1927	59th 60th 61st 62nd 63rd 64th 65th 66th 67th 68th 69th	Elected in 1904. Re-elected in 1906. Re-elected in 1908. Re-elected in 1910. Re-elected in 1912. Re-elected in 1914. Re-elected in 1916. Re-elected in 1918. Re-elected in 1920. Re-elected in 1922. Re-elected in 1924. Retired.	1903–1913 [data missing]
Gordon Lee (Chickamauga)	Democratic	March 4, 1905 – March 3, 1927	59th 60th 61st 62nd 63rd 64th 65th 66th 67th 68th 69th	Elected in 1904. Re-elected in 1906. Re-elected in 1908. Re-elected in 1910. Re-elected in 1912. Re-elected in 1914. Re-elected in 1916. Re-elected in 1918. Re-elected in 1920. Re-elected in 1922. Re-elected in 1924. Retired.	1913–1933 [data missing]
Malcolm C. Tarver (Dalton)	Democratic	March 4, 1927 – January 3, 1947	70th 71st 72nd 73rd 74th 75th 76th 77th 78th 79th	Elected in 1926. Re-elected in 1928. Re-elected in 1930. Re-elected in 1932. Re-elected in 1934. Re-elected in 1936. Re-elected in 1938. Re-elected in 1940. Re-elected in 1942. Re-elected in 1944. Lost renomination.	1913–1933 [data missing]
Malcolm C. Tarver (Dalton)	Democratic	March 4, 1927 – January 3, 1947	70th 71st 72nd 73rd 74th 75th 76th 77th 78th 79th	Elected in 1926. Re-elected in 1928. Re-elected in 1930. Re-elected in 1932. Re-elected in 1934. Re-elected in 1936. Re-elected in 1938. Re-elected in 1940. Re-elected in 1942. Re-elected in 1944. Lost renomination.	1933–1943 [data missing]
Malcolm C. Tarver (Dalton)	Democratic	March 4, 1927 – January 3, 1947	70th 71st 72nd 73rd 74th 75th 76th 77th 78th 79th	Elected in 1926. Re-elected in 1928. Re-elected in 1930. Re-elected in 1932. Re-elected in 1934. Re-elected in 1936. Re-elected in 1938. Re-elected in 1940. Re-elected in 1942. Re-elected in 1944. Lost renomination.	1943–1953 [data missing]
Henderson L. Lanham (Rome)	Democratic	January 3, 1947 – November 10, 1957	80th 81st 82nd 83rd 84th 85th	Elected in 1946. Re-elected in 1948. Re-elected in 1950. Re-elected in 1952. Re-elected in 1954. Re-elected in 1956. Died.	1943–1953 [data missing]
Henderson L. Lanham (Rome)	Democratic	January 3, 1947 – November 10, 1957	80th 81st 82nd 83rd 84th 85th	Elected in 1946. Re-elected in 1948. Re-elected in 1950. Re-elected in 1952. Re-elected in 1954. Re-elected in 1956. Died.	1953–1963 [data missing]
Vacant		November 10, 1957 – January 8, 1958	85th		1953–1963 [data missing]
Harlan E. Mitchell (Dalton)	Democratic	January 8, 1958 – January 3, 1961	85th 86th	Elected to finish Lanham's term. Re-elected in 1958. Retired to run for Georgia State Senate.	1953–1963 [data missing]
John W. Davis (Summerville)	Democratic	January 3, 1961 – January 3, 1975	87th 88th 89th 90th 91st 92nd 93rd	Elected in 1960. Re-elected in 1962. Re-elected in 1964. Re-elected in 1966. Re-elected in 1968. Re-elected in 1970. Re-elected in 1972. Lost renomination.	1953–1963 [data missing]
John W. Davis (Summerville)	Democratic	January 3, 1961 – January 3, 1975	87th 88th 89th 90th 91st 92nd 93rd	Elected in 1960. Re-elected in 1962. Re-elected in 1964. Re-elected in 1966. Re-elected in 1968. Re-elected in 1970. Re-elected in 1972. Lost renomination.	1963–1973 [data missing]
John W. Davis (Summerville)	Democratic	January 3, 1961 – January 3, 1975	87th 88th 89th 90th 91st 92nd 93rd	Elected in 1960. Re-elected in 1962. Re-elected in 1964. Re-elected in 1966. Re-elected in 1968. Re-elected in 1970. Re-elected in 1972. Lost renomination.	1973–1983 [data missing]
Larry McDonald (Marietta)	Democratic	January 3, 1975 – September 1, 1983	94th 95th 96th 97th 98th	Elected in 1974. Re-elected in 1976. Re-elected in 1978. Re-elected in 1980. Re-elected in 1982. Died in Korean Air Lines Flight 007.	1973–1983 [data missing]
Larry McDonald (Marietta)	Democratic	January 3, 1975 – September 1, 1983	94th 95th 96th 97th 98th	Elected in 1974. Re-elected in 1976. Re-elected in 1978. Re-elected in 1980. Re-elected in 1982. Died in Korean Air Lines Flight 007.	1983–1993 [data missing]
Vacant		September 1, 1983 – November 8, 1983	98th		1983–1993 [data missing]
George Darden (Marietta)	Democratic	November 8, 1983 – January 3, 1995	98th 99th 100th 101st 102nd 103rd	Elected to finish McDonald's term. Re-elected in 1984. Re-elected in 1986. Re-elected in 1988. Re-elected in 1990. Re-elected in 1992. Lost re-election.	1983–1993 [data missing]
George Darden (Marietta)	Democratic	November 8, 1983 – January 3, 1995	98th 99th 100th 101st 102nd 103rd	Elected to finish McDonald's term. Re-elected in 1984. Re-elected in 1986. Re-elected in 1988. Re-elected in 1990. Re-elected in 1992. Lost re-election.	1993–2003 [data missing]
Bob Barr (Smyrna)	Republican	January 3, 1995 – January 3, 2003	104th 105th 106th 107th	Elected in 1994. Re-elected in 1996. Re-elected in 1998. Re-elected in 2000. Lost renomination.	1993–2003 [data missing]
John Linder (Duluth)	Republican	January 3, 2003 – January 3, 2011	108th 109th 110th 111th	Redistricted from the 11th district and re-elected in 2002. Re-elected in 2004. Re-elected in 2006. Re-elected in 2008. Retired.	2003–2007
John Linder (Duluth)	Republican	January 3, 2003 – January 3, 2011	108th 109th 110th 111th	Redistricted from the 11th district and re-elected in 2002. Re-elected in 2004. Re-elected in 2006. Re-elected in 2008. Retired.	2007–2013
Rob Woodall (Lawrenceville)	Republican	January 3, 2011 – January 3, 2021	112th 113th 114th 115th 116th	Elected in 2010. Re-elected in 2012. Re-elected in 2014. Re-elected in 2016. Re-elected in 2018. Retired.	2007–2013
Rob Woodall (Lawrenceville)	Republican	January 3, 2011 – January 3, 2021	112th 113th 114th 115th 116th	Elected in 2010. Re-elected in 2012. Re-elected in 2014. Re-elected in 2016. Re-elected in 2018. Retired.	2013–2023
Carolyn Bourdeaux (Suwanee)	Democratic	January 3, 2021 – January 3, 2023	117th	Elected in 2020. Lost renomination.	2013–2023
Lucy McBath (Marietta)	Democratic	January 3, 2023 – January 3, 2025	118th	Redistricted from the 6th district and re-elected in 2022. Redistricted to the 6th district.	2023–2025
Rich McCormick (Suwanee)	Republican	January 3, 2025– present	119th	Redistricted from the 6th district and re-elected in 2024. Re-elected in 2026.	2025–present

== Election results ==
=== 2002 ===
Georgia's 7th Congressional District Election (2002)
Party	Candidate	Votes	%
Republican	John Linder	138,997	78.91
Democratic	Michael Berlon	37,124	21.08
No party	Others	24	0.02
Total votes		176,145	100.00
Turnout			
Republican hold			

=== 2004 ===
Georgia's 7th Congressional District Election (2004)
Party	Candidate	Votes	%
Republican	John Linder*	258,982	100.00
Total votes		258,982	100.00
Turnout			
Republican hold			

=== 2006 ===
Georgia's 7th Congressional District Election (2006)
Party	Candidate	Votes	%
Republican	John Linder*	130,561	70.91
Democratic	Allan Burns	53,553	29.09
Total votes		184,114	100.00
Turnout			
Republican hold			

=== 2008 ===
Georgia's 7th Congressional District Election (2008)
Party	Candidate	Votes	%
Republican	John Linder*	209,354	62.03
Democratic	Doug Heckman	128,159	37.97
Total votes		337,513	100.00
Turnout			
Republican hold			

=== 2010 ===
Georgia's 7th Congressional District Election (2010)
Party	Candidate	Votes	%
Republican	Rob Woodall	160,898	67.07
Democratic	Doug Heckman	78,996	32.93
Total votes		239,894	100.00
Turnout			
Republican hold			

=== 2012 ===
Georgia's 7th Congressional District Election (2012)
Party	Candidate	Votes	%
Republican	Rob Woodall (incumbent)	156,689	62.16
Democratic	Steve Riley	95,377	37.84
Total votes		252,066	100.00
Turnout			
Republican hold			

=== 2014 ===
Georgia's 7th Congressional District Election (2014)
Party	Candidate	Votes	%
Republican	Rob Woodall (incumbent)	113,557	65.39
Democratic	Thomas Wight	60,112	34.61
Total votes		173,669	100.00
Turnout			
Republican hold			

=== 2016 ===
Georgia's 7th Congressional District Election (2016)
Party	Candidate	Votes	%
Republican	Rob Woodall (incumbent)	174,081	60.38
Democratic	Rashid Malik	114,220	39.62
Total votes		288,301	100.00
Turnout			
Republican hold			

=== 2018 ===
Georgia's 7th congressional district, 2018
Party	Candidate	Votes	%
Republican	Rob Woodall (incumbent)	140,430	50.08
Democratic	Carolyn Bourdeaux	140,011	49.92
Total votes		280,441	100.0
Republican hold			

=== 2020 ===
Georgia's 7th congressional district, 2020
Party	Candidate	Votes	%
Democratic	Carolyn Bourdeaux	190,900	51.39
Republican	Rich McCormick	180,564	48.61
Total votes		371,464	100.0
Democratic gain from Republican			

=== 2022 ===
Georgia's 7th congressional district, 2022
Party	Candidate	Votes	%
Democratic	Lucy McBath (incumbent)	143,063	61.05
Republican	Mark Gonsalves	91,262	38.95
Total votes		234,325	100.0
Democratic hold			

=== 2024 ===
Georgia's 7th congressional district, 2024
Party	Candidate	Votes	%
Republican	Rich McCormick (incumbent)	275,907	64.85
Democratic	Bob Christian	149,535	35.15
Total votes		425,442	100.0
Republican hold			

== See also ==
- Georgia's congressional districts
- List of United States congressional districts
