= 1996 United States House of Representatives elections in Georgia =

- November 5, 1996

All 11 Georgia seats to the United States House of Representatives
| | Majority party | Minority party |
|---|---|---|
| Party | Republican | Democratic |
| Last election | 7 | 4 |
| Seats before | 8 | 3 |
| Seats won | 8 | 3 |
| Seat change | Steady | Steady |
| Popular vote | 1,151,993 | 1,011,190 |
| Percentage | 53.26% | 46.75% |
| Swing | ▼1.26% | ▲1.27% |

Republican
50–60%
60–70%
70–80%
Democratic
50–60%
60–70%
70–80%
90–100%

The 1996 House elections in Georgia occurred on November 5, 1996, to elect the members of the State of Georgia's delegation to the United States House of Representatives. Georgia had eleven seats in the House, apportioned according to the 1990 United States census.

These elections were held concurrently with the United States Senate elections of 1996 (including one election in Georgia), the United States House elections in other states, and various state and local elections.

Following the United States Supreme Court's ruling in the 1995 case Miller v. Johnson, the Second, based in Southwest Georgia, and then-Eleventh districts, which previously stretched from Atlanta to Savannah, were dismantled after being found unconstitutional for violating the Equal Protection Clause of the Fourteenth Amendment to the United States Constitution, according to the interpretation in Shaw v. Reno. As a result, these and neighboring districts were redrawn prior to the 1996 elections.

Though Cynthia McKinney's (D) district (renumbered as the Fourth) remained heavily Democratic, Representative Sanford Bishop (D-GA-2) however became more vulnerable when his district was reconfigured from being a Majority-minority district into a Majority-White district. At the same time, Freshmen Republican Representatives Saxby Chambliss (GA-8) and Charlie Norwood (GA-10) also faced more competitive races when many of the African-American populated areas previously included in the two aforementioned districts were incorporated into each of their districts.

Despite the reconfigurations in the Second, Eighth, and Tenth districts, all three incumbents were re-elected by close margins.

== Overview ==
United States House of Representatives elections in Georgia, 1996
| Party | Votes | Percentage | Seats before | Seats after | +/– |
|---|---|---|---|---|---|
| Republican | 1,151,993 | 53.255% | 8 | 8 | ±0 |
| Democratic | 1,011,190 | 46.746% | 3 | 3 | ±0 |
| Others | 0 | 0.0% | 0 | 0 | |
| Valid votes | - | -% | | | |
| Invalid or blank votes | - | -% | | | |
| Totals | 2,163,183 | 100.00% | 11 | 11 | - |
| Voter turnout | | | | | |

== Results ==
| District | Incumbent | Party | Elected | Status | Result |
|---|---|---|---|---|---|
| Georgia's 1st | Jack Kingston | Republican | 1992 | Re-elected | Jack Kingston (R) 68.21% Rosemary Kaszans (D) 31.79% |
| Georgia's 2nd | Sanford Bishop | Democratic | 1992 | Re-elected | Sanford Bishop (D) 53.97% Darrel Ealum (R) 46.03% |
| Georgia's 3rd | Mac Collins | Republican | 1992 | Re-elected | Mac Collins (R) 61.11% Jim Chafin (D) 38.89% |
| Georgia's 4th | Cynthia McKinney | Democratic | 1992 | Re-elected | Cynthia McKinney (D) 57.76% John Mitnick (R) 42.24% |
| Georgia's 5th | John Lewis | Democratic | 1986 | Re-elected | John Lewis (D) unopposed |
| Georgia's 6th | Newt Gingrich | Republican | 1978 | Re-elected | Newt Gingrich (R) 57.80% Michael Coles (D) 42.20% |
| Georgia's 7th | Bob Barr | Republican | 1994 | Re-elected | Bob Barr (R) 57.80% Charlie Watts (D) 42.20% |
| Georgia's 8th | Saxby Chambliss | Republican | 1994 | Re-elected | Saxby Chambliss (R) 52.56% Jim Wiggins (D) 47.44% |
| Georgia's 9th | Nathan Deal | Republican | 1992 | Re-elected | Nathan Deal (R) 65.55% Ken Poston (D) 34.45% |
| Georgia's 10th | Charlie Norwood | Republican | 1994 | Re-elected | Charlie Norwood (R) 52.34% David Bell (D) 47.65% |
| Georgia's 11th | John Linder | Republican | 1992 | Re-elected | John Linder (R) 64.31% Tommy Stephenson (D) 35.69% |
