= Georgia's 2nd congressional district =

U.S. House district for Georgia

Coordinates: 31°48′55″N 84°25′07″W

- Interactive map of district boundaries since January 3, 2023
- Representative: Sanford Bishop; D–Albany
- Distribution: 65.75% urban; 34.25% rural
- Population (2025): 764,755
- Median household income: $54,497
- Ethnicity: 49.0% Black; 39.9% White; 5.9% Hispanic; 3.1% Two or more races; 1.3% Asian; 0.7% other
- Cook PVI: D+4

Georgia's 2nd congressional district is a congressional district in the U.S. state of Georgia. The district is currently represented by Democrat Sanford D. Bishop, Jr.

Georgia's largest district by land area, it comprises much of the southwestern portion of the state. Much of the district is rural, although the district has a number of small cities and medium-sized towns, such as Albany, Americus, Bainbridge, and Thomasville. It also contains most of Columbus and Macon. The district is also the historic home of former President Jimmy Carter.

The 2nd district is one of the most consistently Democratic in the country, as Democrats have held it since 1875. However, it has grown far less heavily blue in recent years due to shifting demographics. With a PVI of D+4, it is the least Democratic majority-black district in the United States.

The district's boundaries were redrawn following the 2010 census, which granted an additional congressional seat to Georgia. In 2021, following the 2020 census, the 156th Georgia General Assembly passed new congressional maps signed by Governor Kemp, and redrew this district from 51% African American to 49% African American, beginning in 2023, however this is primarily due to the decline of black population in the rural Black Belt.

== Counties and communities ==
For the 119th and successive Congresses (based on the districts drawn following a 2023 court order), the district contains all or portions of the following counties and communities.

Baker County (1)

Newton

Bibb County (1)

Macon (part; also 8th)

Chattahoochee County (1)

Cusseta

Calhoun County (4)

All four communities

Clay County (2)

Bluffton, Fort Gaines

Crawford County (3)

All three communities

Decatur County (5)

All five communities

Dooly County (6)

All six communities

Dougherty County (2)

Albany, Putney

Early County (4)

All four communities

Grady County (3)

All three communities

Houston County (3)

Centerville, Robins AFB, Warner Robins (part; also 8th; shared with Peach County)

Lee County (2)

Leesburg, Smithville

Macon County (4)

All four communities

Marion County (2)

Buena Vista, Tazewell

Miller County (2)

Boykin, Colquitt

Mitchell County (5)

All five communities

Muscogee County (1)

Columbus (part; also 3rd)

Peach County (4)

All four communities

Quitman County (1)

Georgetown

Randolph County (3)

All three communities

Schley County (1)

Ellaville

Seminole County (2)

Donalsonville, Iron City

Stewart County (2)

Lumpkin, Richland

Sumter County (5)

All five communities

Talbot County (6)

All six communities

Taylor County (3)

All three communities

Terrell County (4)

All four communities

Thomas County (7)

All seven communities

Webster County (1)

Preston

== Recent election results from statewide races ==
Year	Office	Results
2008	President	Obama 56% - 43%
2012	President	Obama 57% - 42%
2016	President	Clinton 54% - 45%
2016	Senate	Barksdale 49% - 48%
2018	Governor	Abrams 55% - 45%
2018	Lt. Governor	Riggs Amico 55% - 45%
2018	Attorney General	Bailey 54% - 46%
2020	President	Biden 55% - 44%
2021	Senate (Reg.)	Ossoff 56% - 44%
2021	Senate (Spec.)	Warnock 56% - 44%
2022	Senate	Warnock 56% - 44%
2022	Governor	Abrams 52% - 48%
2022	Lt. Governor	Bailey 51% - 47%
2022	Secretary of State	Nguyen 49% - 48%
2022	Attorney General	Jordan 52% - 47%
2024	President	Harris 54% - 46%

== List of members representing the district ==
Member	Party	Years	Cong ress	Electoral history	District location
District created March 4, 1789
Abraham Baldwin (Savannah)	Anti-Administration	March 4, 1789 – March 3, 1791	1st 2nd	Elected in 1789. Re-elected in 1791. Redistricted to the at-large district.	1789–1791 "Middle district": Burke, Camden, Chatham, Effingham, Glynn, Greene, Liberty, Richmond, Washington, and Wilkes counties
Abraham Baldwin (Savannah)	Anti-Administration	March 4, 1791 – March 3, 1793	1st 2nd	Elected in 1789. Re-elected in 1791. Redistricted to the at-large district.	1791–1793 "Middle district": Burke, Columbia, Richmond, and Washington counties
District inactive		March 4, 1793 – March 3, 1827			
John Forsyth (Augusta)	Jacksonian	March 4, 1827 – November 7, 1827	20th	Redistricted from the at-large district and re-elected in 1826. Resigned.	1827–1829 [data missing]
Vacant		November 7, 1827 – November 17, 1827	20th		1827–1829 [data missing]
Richard H. Wilde (Augusta)	Jacksonian	November 17, 1827 – March 3, 1829	20th	Elected November 17, 1827 to finish Forsyth's term and seated January 14, 1828. Redistricted to the at-large district.	1827–1829 [data missing]
District inactive		March 4, 1829 – March 3, 1845			
Seaborn Jones (Columbus)	Democratic	March 4, 1845 – March 3, 1847	29th	Elected in 1844. [data missing]	1845–1853 [data missing]
Alfred Iverson Sr. (Columbus)	Democratic	March 4, 1847 – March 3, 1849	30th	Elected in 1846. [data missing]	1845–1853 [data missing]
Marshall J. Wellborn (Columbus)	Democratic	March 4, 1849 – March 3, 1851	31st	Elected in 1848. [data missing]	1845–1853 [data missing]
James Johnson (Columbus)	Constitutional Union	March 4, 1851 – March 3, 1853	32nd	Elected in 1851. [data missing]	1845–1853 [data missing]
Alfred H. Colquitt (Newton)	Democratic	March 4, 1853 – March 3, 1855	33rd	Elected in 1853. [data missing]	1853–1861 [data missing]
Martin J. Crawford (Columbus)	Democratic	March 4, 1855 – January 23, 1861	34th 35th 36th	Elected in 1855. Re-elected in 1857. Re-elected in 1859. Withdrew.	1853–1861 [data missing]
Vacant		January 23, 1861 – July 25, 1868	36th 37th 38th 39th 40th	Civil War and Reconstruction	
Nelson Tift (Albany)	Democratic	July 25, 1868 – March 3, 1869	40th	Elected in 1868 to finish term. [data missing]	1868–1873 [data missing]
Vacant		March 4, 1869 – December 22, 1870	41st		1868–1873 [data missing]
Richard H. Whiteley (Bainbridge)	Republican	December 22, 1870 – March 3, 1875	41st 42nd 43rd	Installed after Nelson Tift was not permitted to qualify. Re-elected in 1872. [data missing]	1868–1873 [data missing]
Richard H. Whiteley (Bainbridge)	Republican	December 22, 1870 – March 3, 1875	41st 42nd 43rd	Installed after Nelson Tift was not permitted to qualify. Re-elected in 1872. [data missing]	1873–1883 [data missing]
William E. Smith (Albany)	Democratic	March 4, 1875 – March 3, 1881	44th 45th 46th	Elected in 1874. Re-elected in 1876. Re-elected in 1878. [data missing]	1873–1883 [data missing]
Henry G. Turner (Quitman)	Democratic	March 4, 1881 – March 3, 1893	47th 48th 49th 50th 51st 52nd	Elected in 1880. Re-elected in 1882. Re-elected in 1884. Re-elected in 1886. Re-elected in 1888. Re-elected in 1890. Redistricted to the 11th district.	1873–1883 [data missing]
Henry G. Turner (Quitman)	Democratic	March 4, 1881 – March 3, 1893	47th 48th 49th 50th 51st 52nd	Elected in 1880. Re-elected in 1882. Re-elected in 1884. Re-elected in 1886. Re-elected in 1888. Re-elected in 1890. Redistricted to the 11th district.	1883–1893 [data missing]
Benjamin E. Russell (Bainbridge)	Democratic	March 4, 1893 – March 3, 1897	53rd 54th	Elected in 1892. Re-elected in 1894. [data missing]	1893–1903 [data missing]
James M. Griggs (Dawson)	Democratic	March 4, 1897 – January 5, 1910	55th 56th 57th 58th 59th 60th 61st	Elected in 1896. Re-elected in 1898. Re-elected in 1900. Re-elected in 1902. Re-elected in 1904. Re-elected in 1906. Re-elected in 1908. Died.	1893–1903 [data missing]
James M. Griggs (Dawson)	Democratic	March 4, 1897 – January 5, 1910	55th 56th 57th 58th 59th 60th 61st	Elected in 1896. Re-elected in 1898. Re-elected in 1900. Re-elected in 1902. Re-elected in 1904. Re-elected in 1906. Re-elected in 1908. Died.	1903–1913 [data missing]
Vacant		January 5, 1910 – February 6, 1910	61st		1903–1913 [data missing]
Seaborn Roddenbery (Thomasville)	Democratic	February 6, 1910 – September 25, 1913	61st 62nd 63rd	Elected to finish Griggs's term. Re-elected in 1910. Re-elected in 1912. Died.	1903–1913 [data missing]
Seaborn Roddenbery (Thomasville)	Democratic	February 6, 1910 – September 25, 1913	61st 62nd 63rd	Elected to finish Griggs's term. Re-elected in 1910. Re-elected in 1912. Died.	1913–1923 [data missing]
Vacant		September 25, 1913 – November 4, 1913	63rd		1913–1923 [data missing]
Frank Park (Sylvester)	Democratic	November 4, 1913 – March 3, 1925	63rd 64th 65th 66th 67th 68th	Elected to finish Roddenbery's term. Re-elected in 1914. Re-elected in 1916. Re-elected in 1918. Re-elected in 1920. Re-elected in 1922. [data missing]	1913–1923 [data missing]
Frank Park (Sylvester)	Democratic	November 4, 1913 – March 3, 1925	63rd 64th 65th 66th 67th 68th	Elected to finish Roddenbery's term. Re-elected in 1914. Re-elected in 1916. Re-elected in 1918. Re-elected in 1920. Re-elected in 1922. [data missing]	1923–1933 [data missing]
E. Eugene Cox (Camilla)	Democratic	March 4, 1925 – December 24, 1952	69th 70th 71st 72nd 73rd 74th 75th 76th 77th 78th 79th 80th 81st 82nd	Elected in 1924. Re-elected in 1926. Re-elected in 1928. Re-elected in 1930. Re-elected in 1932. Re-elected in 1934. Re-elected in 1936. Re-elected in 1938. Re-elected in 1940. Re-elected in 1942. Re-elected in 1944. Re-elected in 1946. Re-elected in 1948. Re-elected in 1950. Re-elected in 1952. Died.	1923–1933 [data missing]
E. Eugene Cox (Camilla)	Democratic	March 4, 1925 – December 24, 1952	69th 70th 71st 72nd 73rd 74th 75th 76th 77th 78th 79th 80th 81st 82nd	Elected in 1924. Re-elected in 1926. Re-elected in 1928. Re-elected in 1930. Re-elected in 1932. Re-elected in 1934. Re-elected in 1936. Re-elected in 1938. Re-elected in 1940. Re-elected in 1942. Re-elected in 1944. Re-elected in 1946. Re-elected in 1948. Re-elected in 1950. Re-elected in 1952. Died.	1933–1943 [data missing]
E. Eugene Cox (Camilla)	Democratic	March 4, 1925 – December 24, 1952	69th 70th 71st 72nd 73rd 74th 75th 76th 77th 78th 79th 80th 81st 82nd	Elected in 1924. Re-elected in 1926. Re-elected in 1928. Re-elected in 1930. Re-elected in 1932. Re-elected in 1934. Re-elected in 1936. Re-elected in 1938. Re-elected in 1940. Re-elected in 1942. Re-elected in 1944. Re-elected in 1946. Re-elected in 1948. Re-elected in 1950. Re-elected in 1952. Died.	1943–1953 [data missing]
Vacant		December 24, 1952 – February 4, 1953	82nd 83rd		1943–1953 [data missing]
Vacant		December 24, 1952 – February 4, 1953	82nd 83rd		1953–1963 [data missing]
J. L. Pilcher (Meigs)	Democratic	February 4, 1953 – January 3, 1965	83rd 84th 85th 86th 87th 88th	Elected to finish Cox's term. Re-elected in 1954. Re-elected in 1956. Re-elected in 1958. Re-elected in 1960. Re-elected in 1962. [data missing]	1953–1963 [data missing]
J. L. Pilcher (Meigs)	Democratic	February 4, 1953 – January 3, 1965	83rd 84th 85th 86th 87th 88th	Elected to finish Cox's term. Re-elected in 1954. Re-elected in 1956. Re-elected in 1958. Re-elected in 1960. Re-elected in 1962. [data missing]	1963–1973 [data missing]
Maston E. O'Neal Jr. (Bainbridge)	Democratic	January 3, 1965 – January 3, 1971	89th 90th 91st	Elected in 1964. Re-elected in 1966. Re-elected in 1968. [data missing]	1963–1973 [data missing]
Dawson Mathis (Albany)	Democratic	January 3, 1971 – January 3, 1981	92nd 93rd 94th 95th 96th	Elected in 1970. Re-elected in 1972. Re-elected in 1974. Re-elected in 1976. Re-elected in 1978. [data missing]	1963–1973 [data missing]
Dawson Mathis (Albany)	Democratic	January 3, 1971 – January 3, 1981	92nd 93rd 94th 95th 96th	Elected in 1970. Re-elected in 1972. Re-elected in 1974. Re-elected in 1976. Re-elected in 1978. [data missing]	1973–1983 [data missing]
Charles F. Hatcher (Albany)	Democratic	January 3, 1981 – January 3, 1993	97th 98th 99th 100th 101st 102nd	Elected in 1980. Re-elected in 1982. Re-elected in 1984. Re-elected in 1986. Re-elected in 1988. Re-elected in 1990. [data missing]	1973–1983 [data missing]
Charles F. Hatcher (Albany)	Democratic	January 3, 1981 – January 3, 1993	97th 98th 99th 100th 101st 102nd	Elected in 1980. Re-elected in 1982. Re-elected in 1984. Re-elected in 1986. Re-elected in 1988. Re-elected in 1990. [data missing]	1983–1993 [data missing]
Sanford Bishop (Albany)	Democratic	January 3, 1993 – present	103rd 104th 105th 106th 107th 108th 109th 110th 111th 112th 113th 114th 115th 116th 117th 118th 119th	Elected in 1992. Re-elected in 1994. Re-elected in 1996. Re-elected in 1998. Re-elected in 2000. Re-elected in 2002. Re-elected in 2004. Re-elected in 2006. Re-elected in 2008. Re-elected in 2010. Re-elected in 2012. Re-elected in 2014. Re-elected in 2016. Re-elected in 2018. Re-elected in 2020. Re-elected in 2022. Re-elected in 2024. Re-elected in 2026.	1993–2003 [data missing]
Sanford Bishop (Albany)	Democratic	January 3, 1993 – present	103rd 104th 105th 106th 107th 108th 109th 110th 111th 112th 113th 114th 115th 116th 117th 118th 119th	Elected in 1992. Re-elected in 1994. Re-elected in 1996. Re-elected in 1998. Re-elected in 2000. Re-elected in 2002. Re-elected in 2004. Re-elected in 2006. Re-elected in 2008. Re-elected in 2010. Re-elected in 2012. Re-elected in 2014. Re-elected in 2016. Re-elected in 2018. Re-elected in 2020. Re-elected in 2022. Re-elected in 2024. Re-elected in 2026.	2003–2007
Sanford Bishop (Albany)	Democratic	January 3, 1993 – present	103rd 104th 105th 106th 107th 108th 109th 110th 111th 112th 113th 114th 115th 116th 117th 118th 119th	Elected in 1992. Re-elected in 1994. Re-elected in 1996. Re-elected in 1998. Re-elected in 2000. Re-elected in 2002. Re-elected in 2004. Re-elected in 2006. Re-elected in 2008. Re-elected in 2010. Re-elected in 2012. Re-elected in 2014. Re-elected in 2016. Re-elected in 2018. Re-elected in 2020. Re-elected in 2022. Re-elected in 2024. Re-elected in 2026.	2007–2013
Sanford Bishop (Albany)	Democratic	January 3, 1993 – present	103rd 104th 105th 106th 107th 108th 109th 110th 111th 112th 113th 114th 115th 116th 117th 118th 119th	Elected in 1992. Re-elected in 1994. Re-elected in 1996. Re-elected in 1998. Re-elected in 2000. Re-elected in 2002. Re-elected in 2004. Re-elected in 2006. Re-elected in 2008. Re-elected in 2010. Re-elected in 2012. Re-elected in 2014. Re-elected in 2016. Re-elected in 2018. Re-elected in 2020. Re-elected in 2022. Re-elected in 2024. Re-elected in 2026.	2013–2023
Sanford Bishop (Albany)	Democratic	January 3, 1993 – present	103rd 104th 105th 106th 107th 108th 109th 110th 111th 112th 113th 114th 115th 116th 117th 118th 119th	Elected in 1992. Re-elected in 1994. Re-elected in 1996. Re-elected in 1998. Re-elected in 2000. Re-elected in 2002. Re-elected in 2004. Re-elected in 2006. Re-elected in 2008. Re-elected in 2010. Re-elected in 2012. Re-elected in 2014. Re-elected in 2016. Re-elected in 2018. Re-elected in 2020. Re-elected in 2022. Re-elected in 2024. Re-elected in 2026.	2023–2025
Sanford Bishop (Albany)	Democratic	January 3, 1993 – present	103rd 104th 105th 106th 107th 108th 109th 110th 111th 112th 113th 114th 115th 116th 117th 118th 119th	Elected in 1992. Re-elected in 1994. Re-elected in 1996. Re-elected in 1998. Re-elected in 2000. Re-elected in 2002. Re-elected in 2004. Re-elected in 2006. Re-elected in 2008. Re-elected in 2010. Re-elected in 2012. Re-elected in 2014. Re-elected in 2016. Re-elected in 2018. Re-elected in 2020. Re-elected in 2022. Re-elected in 2024. Re-elected in 2026.	2025–present

== Election results ==
=== 2002 ===
Georgia's 2nd Congressional District Election (2002)
Party	Candidate	Votes	%
Democratic	Sanford Bishop*	102,925	100.00
Total votes		143,700	100.00
Turnout			
Democratic hold			

=== 2004 ===
Georgia's 2nd Congressional District Election (2004)
Party	Candidate	Votes	%
Democratic	Sanford Bishop*	129,984	66.79
Republican	Dave Eversman	64,645	33.21
Total votes		194,629	100.00
Turnout			
Democratic hold			

=== 2006 ===
Georgia's 2nd Congressional District Election (2006)
Party	Candidate	Votes	%
Democratic	Sanford Bishop*	88,662	67.87
Republican	Bradley Hughes	41,967	32.13
Total votes		130,629	100.00
Turnout			
Democratic hold			

=== 2008 ===
Georgia's 2nd Congressional District Election (2008)
Party	Candidate	Votes	%
Democratic	Sanford Bishop*	158,447	68.95
Republican	Lee Ferrell	71,357	31.05
Total votes		229,804	100.00
Turnout			
Democratic hold			

=== 2010 ===
Georgia's 2nd Congressional District Election (2010)
Party	Candidate	Votes	%
Democratic	Sanford Bishop*	86,520	51.44
Republican	Mike Keown	81,673	48.56
Total votes		168,193	100.00
Turnout			
Democratic hold			

=== 2012 ===
Georgia 2nd Congressional District Election (2012)
Party	Candidate	Votes	%
Democratic	Sanford Bishop*	162,751	63.78
Republican	John House	92,410	36.78
Total votes		255,161	100
Democratic hold			

=== 2014 ===
Georgia's 2nd Congressional District Election (2014)
Party	Candidate	Votes	%
Democratic	Sanford Bishop*	96,363	59.15
Republican	Greg Duke	66,357	40.85
Total votes		162,720	100.00
Democratic hold			

=== 2016 ===
Georgia's 2nd Congressional District Election (2016)
Party	Candidate	Votes	%
Democratic	Sanford Bishop*	148,543	61.23
Republican	Greg Duke	94,056	38.77
Total votes		242,599	100.00
Democratic hold			

=== 2018 ===
Georgia's 2nd Congressional District Election (2018)
Party	Candidate	Votes	%
Democratic	Sanford Bishop*	135,709	59.56
Republican	Herman West Jr.	92,132	40.44
Total votes		227,841	100.00
Democratic hold			

=== 2020 ===
Georgia's 2nd Congressional District Election (2020)
Party	Candidate	Votes	%
Democratic	Sanford Bishop*	161,397	59.12
Republican	Don Cole	111,620	40.88
Total votes		273,017	100.00
Democratic hold			

=== 2022 ===
Georgia's 2nd Congressional District Election (2022)
Party	Candidate	Votes	%
Democratic	Sanford Bishop*	132,675	54.97
Republican	Chris West	108,665	45.03
Total votes		241,340	100.00
Democratic hold			

=== 2024 ===
Georgia's 2nd Congressional District Election (2024)
Party	Candidate	Votes	%
Democratic	Sanford Bishop*	176,028	56.3
Republican	A. Wayne Johnson	136,473	43.7
Total votes		312,501	100.00
Democratic hold			

== See also ==
- Georgia's congressional districts
- List of United States congressional districts
