= Georgia's 3rd congressional district =

U.S. House district for Georgia

Coordinates: 33°09′02″N 84°43′43″W

- Interactive map of district boundaries since January 3, 2023
- Representative: Brian Jack; R–Peachtree City
- Distribution: 60.53% urban; 39.47% rural
- Population (2025): 825,280
- Median household income: $83,864
- Ethnicity: 64.4% White; 22.6% Black; 6.3% Hispanic; 3.9% Two or more races; 2.1% Asian; 0.7% other
- Cook PVI: R+15

Georgia's 3rd congressional district is a congressional district in the U.S. state of Georgia. The district is currently represented by Republican Brian Jack. The district's boundaries have been redrawn following the 2010 census, which granted an additional congressional seat to Georgia. The first election using the new district boundaries (listed below) were the 2012 congressional elections.

The district is based in west-central Georgia. It includes most of the southern suburbs of Atlanta–where most of its population is located–as well as the wealthier and more demographically white portions of Columbus and its northern suburbs.

== Counties and communities ==
For the 119th and successive Congresses (based on the districts drawn following a 2023 court order), the district contains all or portions of the following counties and communities.

Carroll County (9)

All nine communities

Coweta County (10)

All 10 communities

Douglas County (3)

Douglasville (part; also 6th), Fairplay, Villa Rica (shared with Carroll County)

Fayette County (5)

Brooks, Fayetteville (part; also 6th), Peachtree City, Tyrone, Woolsey

Haralson County (4)

All four communities

Harris County (9)

All nine communities

Heard County (4)

All four communities

Henry County (2)

Hampton, McDonough (part; also 10th)

Lamar County (3)

All three communities

Meriwether County (8)

All eight communities

Muscogee County (1)

Columbus (part; also 2nd)

Pike County (6)

All six communities

Spalding County (6)

All six communities

Troup County (3)

All three communities

Upson County (7)

All seven communities

== Recent election results from statewide races ==
Year	Office	Results
2008	President	McCain 66% - 33%
2012	President	Romney 68% - 32%
2016	President	Trump 66% - 31%
2016	Senate	Isakson 68% - 28%
2018	Governor	Kemp 66% - 33%
2018	Lt. Governor	Duncan 68% - 32%
2018	Attorney General	Carr 67% - 33%
2020	President	Trump 64% - 34%
2021	Senate (Reg.)	Perdue 65% - 35%
2021	Senate (Spec.)	Loeffler 64% - 36%
2022	Senate	Walker 64% - 36%
2022	Governor	Kemp 68% - 31%
2022	Lt. Governor	Jones 66% - 32%
2022	Secretary of State	Raffensperger 67% - 30%
2022	Attorney General	Carr 67% - 32%
2024	President	Trump 65% - 35%

== List of members representing the district ==
Member	Party	Years	Cong ress	Electoral history	District location
District created March 4, 1789
George Mathews (Washington)	Anti-Administration	March 4, 1789 – March 3, 1791	1st	Elected in 1789. Lost re-election.	1789–1791 "Upper district": Burke, Camden, Chatham, Effingham, Glynn, Greene, Liberty, Richmond, Washington, and Wilkes counties
Francis Willis (Wilkes County)	Anti-Administration	March 4, 1791 – March 3, 1793	2nd	Elected in 1791. Redistricted to the at-large district.	1791–1793 "Northern (or Western) district": Greene and Wilkes counties
District inactive		March 3, 1793 – March 3, 1827			
Wiley Thompson (Elberton)	Jacksonian	March 4, 1827 – March 3, 1829	20th	Redistricted from the at-large district and re-elected in 1826. Redistricted to the at-large district.	1827–1829 [data missing]
District inactive		March 3, 1829 – March 3, 1845			
Vacant		March 4, 1845 – January 5, 1846	29th	Member-elect Washington Poe was never seated.	1845–1853 [data missing]
George W. Towns (Talbotton)	Democratic	January 5, 1846 – March 3, 1847	29th	Elected to finish Poe's term. [data missing]	1845–1853 [data missing]
John W. Jones (Griffin)	Whig	March 4, 1847 – March 3, 1849	30th	Elected in 1846. [data missing]	1845–1853 [data missing]
Allen F. Owen (Talbotton)	Whig	March 4, 1849 – March 3, 1851	31st	Elected in 1848. [data missing]	1845–1853 [data missing]
David J. Bailey (Jackson)	States' rights	March 4, 1851 – March 3, 1853	32nd 33rd	Elected in 1851. Re-elected in 1853. [data missing]	1845–1853 [data missing]
David J. Bailey (Jackson)	Democratic	March 4, 1853 – March 3, 1855	32nd 33rd	Elected in 1851. Re-elected in 1853. [data missing]	1853–1863 [data missing]
Robert P. Trippe (Forsyth)	Know Nothing	March 4, 1855 – March 3, 1859	34th 35th	Elected in 1855. Re-elected in 1857. [data missing]	1853–1863 [data missing]
Thomas Hardeman Jr. (Macon)	Opposition	March 4, 1859 – January 23, 1861	36th	Elected in 1859. Withdrew.	1853–1863 [data missing]
Vacant		January 23, 1861 – July 26, 1868	36th 37th 38th 39th 40th	Civil War and Reconstruction	
William P. Edwards (Butler)	Republican	July 25, 1868 – March 3, 1869	40th	Elected in 1868 but not permitted to qualify.	1863–1873 [data missing]
Vacant		March 4, 1869 – December 22, 1870	41st		1863–1873 [data missing]
Marion Bethune (Talbotton)	Republican	December 22, 1870 – March 3, 1871	41st	Elected to finish Edwards's term. [data missing]	1863–1873 [data missing]
John S. Bigby (Newnan)	Republican	March 4, 1871 – March 3, 1873	42nd	Elected in 1870. [data missing]	1863–1873 [data missing]
Philip Cook (Americus)	Democratic	March 4, 1873 – March 3, 1883	43rd 44th 45th 46th 47th	Elected in 1872. Re-elected in 1874. Re-elected in 1876. Re-elected in 1878. Re-elected in 1880. [data missing]	1873–1883 [data missing]
Charles F. Crisp (Americus)	Democratic	March 4, 1883 – October 23, 1896	48th 49th 50th 51st 52nd 53rd 54th	Elected in 1882. Re-elected in 1884. Re-elected in 1886. Re-elected in 1888. Re-elected in 1890. Re-elected in 1892. Re-elected in 1894. Died.	1883–1893 [data missing]
Charles F. Crisp (Americus)	Democratic	March 4, 1883 – October 23, 1896	48th 49th 50th 51st 52nd 53rd 54th	Elected in 1882. Re-elected in 1884. Re-elected in 1886. Re-elected in 1888. Re-elected in 1890. Re-elected in 1892. Re-elected in 1894. Died.	1893–1903 [data missing]
Vacant		October 23, 1896 – December 19, 1896	54th		1893–1903 [data missing]
Charles R. Crisp (Americus)	Democratic	December 19, 1896 – March 3, 1897	54th	Elected to finish his father's term. Retired.	1893–1903 [data missing]
Elijah B. Lewis (Montezuma)	Democratic	March 4, 1897 – March 3, 1909	55th 56th 57th 58th 59th 60th	Elected in 1896. Re-elected in 1898. Re-elected in 1900. Re-elected in 1902. Re-elected in 1904. Re-elected in 1906. [data missing]	1893–1903 [data missing]
Elijah B. Lewis (Montezuma)	Democratic	March 4, 1897 – March 3, 1909	55th 56th 57th 58th 59th 60th	Elected in 1896. Re-elected in 1898. Re-elected in 1900. Re-elected in 1902. Re-elected in 1904. Re-elected in 1906. [data missing]	1903–1913 [data missing]
Dudley M. Hughes (Danville)	Democratic	March 4, 1909 – March 3, 1913	61st 62nd	Elected in 1908. Re-elected in 1910. Redistricted to the 12th district.	1903–1913 [data missing]
Charles R. Crisp (Americus)	Democratic	March 4, 1913 – October 7, 1932	63rd 64th 65th 66th 67th 68th 69th 70th 71st 72nd	Elected in 1912. Re-elected in 1914. Re-elected in 1916. Re-elected in 1918. Re-elected in 1920. Re-elected in 1922. Re-elected in 1924. Re-elected in 1926. Re-elected in 1928. Re-elected in 1930. Resigned to become member of US Tariff Commission.	1913–1923 [data missing]
Charles R. Crisp (Americus)	Democratic	March 4, 1913 – October 7, 1932	63rd 64th 65th 66th 67th 68th 69th 70th 71st 72nd	Elected in 1912. Re-elected in 1914. Re-elected in 1916. Re-elected in 1918. Re-elected in 1920. Re-elected in 1922. Re-elected in 1924. Re-elected in 1926. Re-elected in 1928. Re-elected in 1930. Resigned to become member of US Tariff Commission.	1923–1933 [data missing]
Vacant		October 7, 1932 – November 8, 1932	72nd		1923–1933 [data missing]
Bryant T. Castellow (Cuthbert)	Democratic	November 8, 1932 – January 3, 1937	72nd 73rd 74th	Elected to finish Crisp's term. Re-elected in 1932. Re-elected in 1934. [data missing]	1923–1933 [data missing]
Bryant T. Castellow (Cuthbert)	Democratic	November 8, 1932 – January 3, 1937	72nd 73rd 74th	Elected to finish Crisp's term. Re-elected in 1932. Re-elected in 1934. [data missing]	1933–1943 [data missing]
Stephen Pace (Americus)	Democratic	January 3, 1937 – January 3, 1951	75th 76th 77th 78th 79th 80th 81st	Elected in 1936. Re-elected in 1938. Re-elected in 1940. Re-elected in 1942. Re-elected in 1944. Re-elected in 1946. Re-elected in 1948. [data missing]	1933–1943 [data missing]
Stephen Pace (Americus)	Democratic	January 3, 1937 – January 3, 1951	75th 76th 77th 78th 79th 80th 81st	Elected in 1936. Re-elected in 1938. Re-elected in 1940. Re-elected in 1942. Re-elected in 1944. Re-elected in 1946. Re-elected in 1948. [data missing]	1943–1953 [data missing]
Tic Forrester (Leesburg)	Democratic	January 3, 1951 – January 3, 1965	82nd 83rd 84th 85th 86th 87th 88th	Elected in 1950. Re-elected in 1952. Re-elected in 1954. Re-elected in 1956. Re-elected in 1958. Re-elected in 1960. Re-elected in 1962. [data missing]	1943–1953 [data missing]
Tic Forrester (Leesburg)	Democratic	January 3, 1951 – January 3, 1965	82nd 83rd 84th 85th 86th 87th 88th	Elected in 1950. Re-elected in 1952. Re-elected in 1954. Re-elected in 1956. Re-elected in 1958. Re-elected in 1960. Re-elected in 1962. [data missing]	1953–1963 [data missing]
Tic Forrester (Leesburg)	Democratic	January 3, 1951 – January 3, 1965	82nd 83rd 84th 85th 86th 87th 88th	Elected in 1950. Re-elected in 1952. Re-elected in 1954. Re-elected in 1956. Re-elected in 1958. Re-elected in 1960. Re-elected in 1962. [data missing]	1963–1973 [data missing]
Bo Callaway (Pine Mountain)	Republican	January 3, 1965 – January 3, 1967	89th	Elected in 1964. [data missing]	1963–1973 [data missing]
Jack Brinkley (Columbus)	Democratic	January 3, 1967 – January 3, 1983	90th 91st 92nd 93rd 94th 95th 96th 97th	Elected in 1966. Re-elected in 1968. Re-elected in 1970. Re-elected in 1972. Re-elected in 1974. Re-elected in 1976. Re-elected in 1978. Re-elected in 1980. [data missing]	1963–1973 [data missing]
Jack Brinkley (Columbus)	Democratic	January 3, 1967 – January 3, 1983	90th 91st 92nd 93rd 94th 95th 96th 97th	Elected in 1966. Re-elected in 1968. Re-elected in 1970. Re-elected in 1972. Re-elected in 1974. Re-elected in 1976. Re-elected in 1978. Re-elected in 1980. [data missing]	1973–1983 [data missing]
Richard Ray (Perry)	Democratic	January 3, 1983 – January 3, 1993	98th 99th 100th 101st 102nd	Elected in 1982. Re-elected in 1984. Re-elected in 1986. Re-elected in 1988. Re-elected in 1990. [data missing]	1983–1993 [data missing]
Mac Collins (Hampton)	Republican	January 3, 1993 – January 3, 2003	103rd 104th 105th 106th 107th	Elected in 1992. Re-elected in 1994. Re-elected in 1996. Re-elected in 1998. Re-elected in 2000. Redistricted to the 8th district.	1993–1997 [data missing]
Mac Collins (Hampton)	Republican	January 3, 1993 – January 3, 2003	103rd 104th 105th 106th 107th	Elected in 1992. Re-elected in 1994. Re-elected in 1996. Re-elected in 1998. Re-elected in 2000. Redistricted to the 8th district.	1997–2003 Muscogee, Harris, Talbot, Meriwether, Coweta, Clayton, Fayette, Henry, Spalding, Pike
Jim Marshall (Macon)	Democratic	January 3, 2003 – January 3, 2007	108th 109th	Elected in 2002. Re-elected in 2004. Redistricted to the 8th district.	2003–2007
Lynn Westmoreland (Grantville)	Republican	January 3, 2007 – January 3, 2017	110th 111th 112th 113th 114th	Redistricted from the 8th district and re-elected in 2006. Re-elected in 2008. Re-elected in 2010. Re-elected in 2012. Re-elected in 2014. Retired.	2007–2013
Lynn Westmoreland (Grantville)	Republican	January 3, 2007 – January 3, 2017	110th 111th 112th 113th 114th	Redistricted from the 8th district and re-elected in 2006. Re-elected in 2008. Re-elected in 2010. Re-elected in 2012. Re-elected in 2014. Retired.	2013–2023
Drew Ferguson (The Rock)	Republican	January 3, 2017 – January 3, 2025	115th 116th 117th 118th	Elected in 2016. Re-elected in 2018. Re-elected in 2020. Re-elected in 2022. Retired.	2013–2023
Drew Ferguson (The Rock)	Republican	January 3, 2017 – January 3, 2025	115th 116th 117th 118th	Elected in 2016. Re-elected in 2018. Re-elected in 2020. Re-elected in 2022. Retired.	2023–2025
Brian Jack (Peachtree City)	Republican	January 3, 2025– present	119th	Elected in 2024. Re-elected in 2026.	2025–present

== Election results ==
=== 2006 ===
Georgia's 3rd Congressional District Election (2006)
Party	Candidate	Votes	%
Republican	Lynn Westmoreland	130,428	67.65
Democratic	Mike McGraw	62,371	32.35
Total votes		192,799	100.00
Turnout			
Republican hold			

=== 2008 ===
Georgia's 3rd Congressional District Election (2008)
Party	Candidate	Votes	%
Republican	Lynn Westmoreland*	225,031	65.70
Democratic	Stephen A. Camp	117,506	34.30
Total votes		342,537	100.00
Turnout			
Republican hold			

=== 2010 ===
Georgia's 3rd Congressional District Election (2010)
Party	Candidate	Votes	%
Republican	Lynn Westmoreland*	168,304	69.48
Democratic	Frank Saunders	73,932	30.52
Total votes		242,236	100.00
Turnout			
Republican hold			

=== 2012 ===
Georgia's 3rd Congressional District Election (2012)
Party	Candidate	Votes	%
Republican	Lynn Westmoreland*	232,380	100.00
Total votes		232.380	100.00
Republican hold			

=== 2014 ===
Georgia's 3rd Congressional District Election (2014)
Party	Candidate	Votes	%
Republican	Lynn Westmoreland*	156,277	100.00
Total votes		156,277	100.00
Republican hold			

=== 2016 ===
Georgia's 3rd Congressional District Election (2016)
Party	Candidate	Votes	%
Republican	Drew Ferguson	207,218	68.35
Democratic	Angela Pendley	95,969	31.65
Total votes		303,187	100.00
Republican hold			

=== 2018 ===
Georgia's 3rd Congressional District Election (2018)
Party	Candidate	Votes	%
Republican	Drew Ferguson*	191,966	65.53
Democratic	Chuck Enderlin	101,010	34.47
Turnout		293,066	53.4%
Republican hold			

=== 2020 ===
Georgia's 3rd Congressional District Election (2020)
Party	Candidate	Votes	%
Republican	Drew Ferguson*	241,526	65.05
Democratic	Val Almonord	129,792	34.95
Total votes		371,318	100.00
Republican hold			

=== 2022 ===
Georgia's 3rd Congressional District Election (2022)
Party	Candidate	Votes	%
Republican	Drew Ferguson*	213,524	68.75
Democratic	Val Almonord	97,057	31.25
Total votes		310,581	100.0
Republican hold			

=== 2024 ===
Georgia's 3rd Congressional District Election (2024)
Party	Candidate	Votes	%
Republican	Brian Jack	273,036	66.31
Democratic	Maura Keller	138,749	33.69
Total votes		411,785	100.0
Republican hold			

== See also ==
- Georgia's congressional districts
- List of United States congressional districts

U.S. House of Representatives
Preceded by Maine's 1st congressional district	Home district of the speaker of the House; December 8, 1891 – March 4, 1895	Succeeded by Maine's 1st congressional district
