= Mac Collins =

American politician (1944–2018)

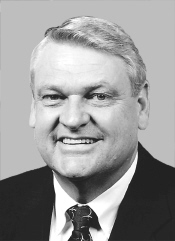

Member of the U.S. House of Representatives from Georgia
- In office January 3, 1993 – January 3, 2005
- Preceded by: Richard Ray
- Succeeded by: Lynn Westmoreland
- Constituency: 3rd district (1993–2003); 8th district (2003–2005)

Member of the Georgia State Senate from the 17th district
- In office January 3, 1989 – January 3, 1993
- Preceded by: Alex Crumbley
- Succeeded by: Mike Crotts

Personal details
- Born: Michael Allen Collins; October 15, 1944 Jackson, Georgia, U.S.
- Died: November 20, 2018 (aged 74) Flovilla, Georgia, U.S.
- Party: Democratic (before 1980); Republican (1980–2018)
- Spouse: Julie Watkins
- Children: 4, including Mike

Michael Allen "Mac" Collins (October 15, 1944 – November 20, 2018) was an American businessman and politician who served in the United States House of Representatives from 1993 to 2005, representing Georgia's 3rd congressional district until 2003 and Georgia's 8th congressional district from 2005. In 2004, he was an unsuccessful candidate for the United States Senate. He was a member of the Republican Party.

== Early life ==
Collins was born in Jackson, Georgia, and joined a concrete products business run by his father after graduating from high school, eventually expanding it into a ready-mix concrete company. His mother was the first woman to serve on the Flovilla, Georgia, city council. He attended public schools throughout his youth. He served in the Georgia Army National Guard from 1964 to 1970.

== Georgia politics and State Senator ==
Collins began his political career in 1977, when he was elected to the Butts County Commission. He was immediately elected chairman by his colleagues and served two terms, giving up his seat in 1980 when he switched his party affiliation from Democratic to Republican. After losing two elections for Georgia State Senate, he was elected in 1988 from a district in Henry County south of Atlanta and served two terms there.

== U.S. House of Representatives ==
=== Electoral history ===
During the 1990s round of redistricting, Democrats in the Georgia state legislature, bent on getting rid of Newt Gingrich, dismantled his old 6th District. The new map shifted much of Gingrich's former territory south of Atlanta—including Collins's home—to the 3rd District, which at the time was based in Columbus and represented by five-term Democrat Richard Ray.

Collins immediately jumped into the race. In 1992, he defeated Paul Broun (who would later be elected to Congress from the 10th District) in the Republican primary and then defeated Ray in the general election by almost 10 points.

In 1994, Collins defeated Democrat Fred Overby 66%-34%.

In 1996, he defeated Democrat Jim Chafin 61%-39%.

In 1998, he ran unopposed for reelection.

In 2000, he defeated Democrat Gail Notti 63%-37%.

After the 2000 redistricting cycle, Collins was placed in the 8th District. In 2002, he easily won re-election by the widest margin of his career over Democrat Angelos Petrakopoulos, 78%-22%.

In 2004, he declined to run for re-election, opting to run for U.S. Senate. Lynn Westmoreland succeeded him representing the 8th District.

=== Congressional tenure ===
In the United States House of Representatives, Collins was a member of the Ways and Means Committee, Deputy Whip for the Republican Party, and was selected by the Speaker of the House to serve on the highly-classified United States House Permanent Select Committee on Intelligence. He lost his role as Deputy Whip of the United States House of Representatives after the September 11 attacks in 2001 when he informed President George W. Bush that he would not support the creation of the Transportation Security Administration (TSA).

Collins was a sponsor in the passage of two bills. The first, H.R. 1121, designated the federal building and United States courthouse located at 18 Greenville Street in Newnan, Georgia, as the "Lewis R. Morgan Federal Building and United States Courthouse." The second, H.R. 1316, amended chapter 87 of title 5, United States Code, with respect to the order of precedence to be applied in the payment of life insurance benefits.

Collins was focused on commerce, tax reform, foreign trade and international finance, and technology legislation.

== Later political career ==
=== 2004 United States Senate campaign ===
In 2004, Collins was an unsuccessful candidate for the Republican nomination for the United States Senate seat left vacant by the retirement of Senator Zell Miller; it went to Johnny Isakson, who won the Republican primary. With 98 percent of precincts reporting, Isakson had 53% of votes, followed by Herman Cain with 26% and Collins with 21%. Isakson went on to win the general election against Democratic Congresswoman Denise Majette.

=== 2006 campaign for U.S. House of Representatives ===
In 2006, Collins moved back to Butts County and made an attempt to return to Congress against Democrat Jim Marshall. This district included none of the territory Collins represented in his first five terms, but three counties that he represented in his last after a mid-decade Republican redistricting. It made for one of the most competitive House races in the nation. The race featured heavy spending, not only by the candidates themselves, but from independent groups. During the campaign, President George W. Bush attended a rally to try to help Collins. Marshall narrowly won reelection by 1,700 votes, 50.5%–49.5%.

== Personal life and death ==
Collins was a Christian and was married to his wife for 54 years. They had four children including Mike Collins who is a U.S. representative for Georgia's 10th congressional district.

Collins died on November 20, 2018, in Flovilla, Georgia, at age 74.

U.S. House of Representatives
Preceded by Richard Ray	Member of the U.S. House of Representatives from Georgia's 3rd congressional district January 3, 1993 – January 3, 2003	Succeeded by Jim Marshall
Preceded by Saxby Chambliss	Member of the U.S. House of Representatives from Georgia's 8th congressional district January 3, 2003 – January 3, 2005	Succeeded by Lynn Westmoreland
