= 2000 United States House of Representatives elections in Georgia =

All 11 Georgia seats to the United States House of Representatives
	Majority party	Minority party
Party	Republican	Democratic
Seats before	8	3
Seats won	8	3
Seat change	Steady	Steady
Popular vote	1,498,337	918,085
Percentage	62.00%	38.00%
Swing	▼1.72%	▲1.72%

Republican
50–60%
60–70%
70–80%
80–90%
>90%
Democratic
50–60%
60–70%
70–80%

The 2000 House elections in Georgia occurred on November 7, 2000 to elect the members of the State of Georgia's delegation to the United States House of Representatives. Georgia had eleven seats in the House, apportioned according to the 1990 United States census.

These elections were held concurrently with the United States presidential election of 2000, United States Senate elections of 2000 (including special Senate election in Georgia), the United States House elections in other states, and various state and local elections.

The only competitive race to occur that year was in Georgia's 2nd congressional district in which incumbent Representative Sanford Bishop overcame a strong challenge from Dylan Glenn.

== Overview ==
United States House of Representatives elections in Georgia, 2000
Party	Votes	Percentage	Seats before	Seats after	+/–
Republican	1,498,337	62.0%	8	8	±0
Democratic	918,085	38.0%	3	3	±0
Others	0	0.0%	0	0	
Valid votes	-	-%			
Invalid or blank votes	-	-%			
Totals	2,416,422	100.00%	11	11	-
Voter turnout					

== Results ==
District	Incumbent	Party	Elected	Status	Result
Georgia's 1st	Jack Kingston	Republican	1992	Re-elected	Jack Kingston (R) 69% Joyce Marie Griggs (D) 31%
Georgia's 2nd	Sanford Bishop	Democratic	1992	Re-elected	Sanford Bishop (D) 53% Dylan Glenn (R) 47%
Georgia's 3rd	Mac Collins	Republican	1992	Re-elected	Mac Collins (R) 63% Gail Notti (D) 37%
Georgia's 4th	Cynthia McKinney	Democratic	1992	Re-elected	Cynthia McKinney (D) 60% Sunny Warren (R) 40%
Georgia's 5th	John Lewis	Democratic	1986	Re-elected	John Lewis (D) 77% Hank Schwab (R) 23%
Georgia's 6th	Johnny Isakson	Republican	1999	Re-elected	Johnny Isakson (R) 75% Brett Dehart (D) 25%
Georgia's 7th	Bob Barr	Republican	1994	Re-elected	Bob Barr (R) 55.3% Roger Kahn (D) 44.7%
Georgia's 8th	Saxby Chambliss	Republican	1994	Re-elected	Saxby Chambliss (R) 59% Jim Marshall (D) 41%
Georgia's 9th	Nathan Deal	Republican	1992	Re-elected	Nathan Deal (R) 75% James Harrington (D) 25%
Georgia's 10th	Charlie Norwood	Republican	1994	Re-elected	Charlie Norwood (R) 63% Denise Freeman (D) 37%
Georgia's 11th	John Linder	Republican	1992	Re-elected	John Linder (R) unopposed

== District 1 ==
2000 Georgia's 1st congressional district election
- November 7, 2000

Nominee	Jack Kingston	Joyce Marie Griggs
Party	Republican	Democratic
Popular vote	131,684	58,776
Percentage	69.1%	30.9%
- County results Kingston: 50–60% 60–70% 70–80% 80–90%
U.S. Representative before election
Jack Kingston
Republican
Elected U.S. Representative
Jack Kingston
Republican

Incumbent Republican Jack Kingston, who was first elected in 1992, ran for re-election. Kingston was re-elected with 69.1% of the vote.

=== General election ===
==== Results ====
Georgia's 1st congressional district election, 2000
Party	Candidate	Votes	%
Republican	Jack Kingston (incumbent)	131,684	69.1
Democratic	Joyce Marie Griggs	58,776	30.9
Total votes		190,460	100.0
Republican hold			

== District 2 ==
2000 Georgia's 2nd congressional district election
- November 7, 2000
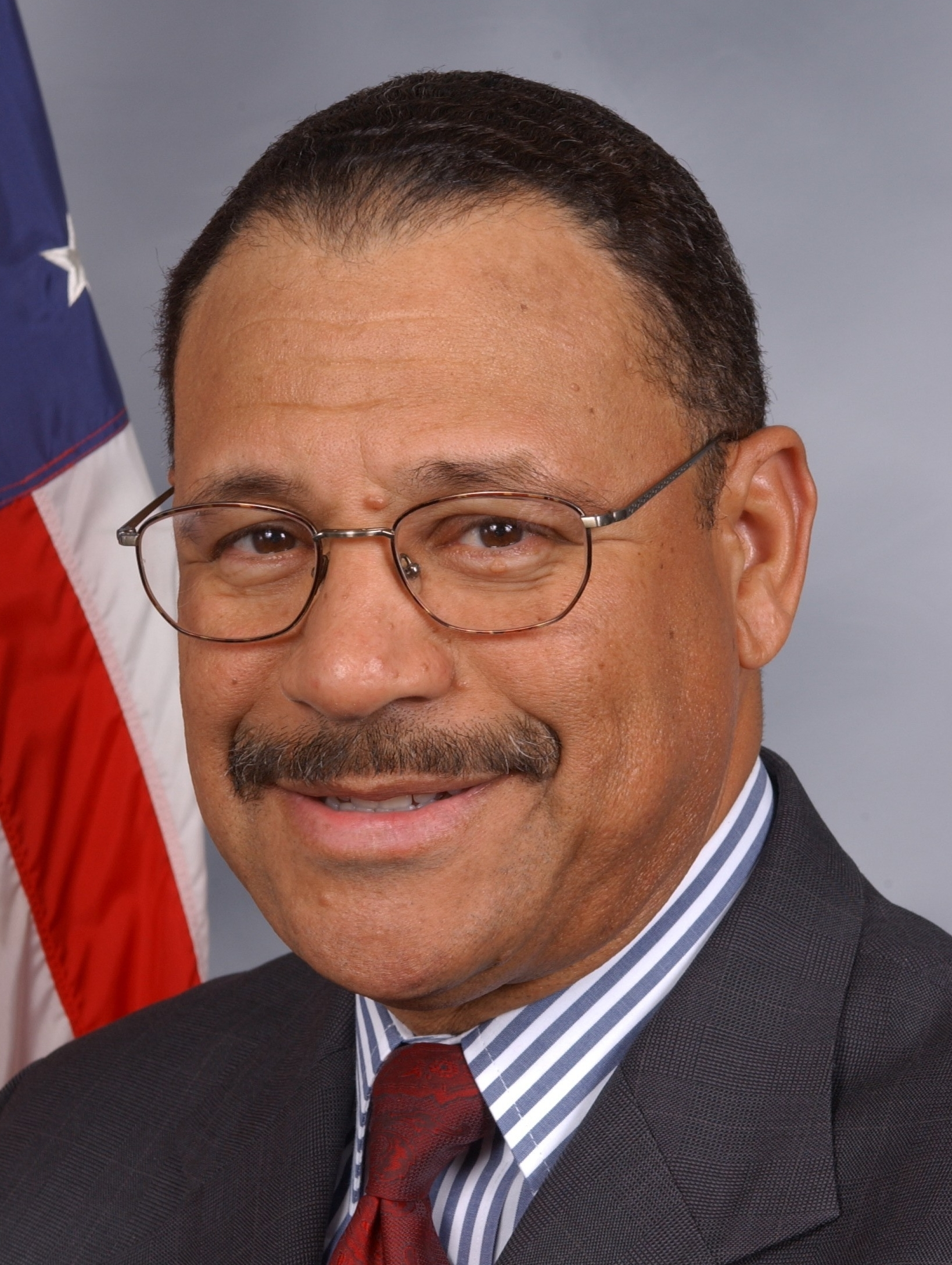

Nominee	Sanford Bishop	Dylan Glenn
Party	Democratic	Republican
Popular vote	96,430	83,870
Percentage	53.5%	46.5%
- County results Bishop: 50–60% 60–70% 70–80% Glenn: 50–60% 60–70%
U.S. Representative before election
Sanford Bishop
Democratic
Elected U.S. Representative
Sanford Bishop
Democratic

Incumbent Democrat Sanford Bishop, who was first elected in 1992, ran for re-election. Bishop was re-elected with 53.5% of the vote.

=== General election ===
==== Results ====
Georgia's 2nd congressional district election, 2000
Party	Candidate	Votes	%
Democratic	Sanford Bishop (incumbent)	96,430	53.5
Republican	Dylan Glenn	83,870	46.5
Total votes		180,300	100.0
Democratic hold			

== District 3 ==
2000 Georgia's 3rd congressional district election
- November 7, 2000
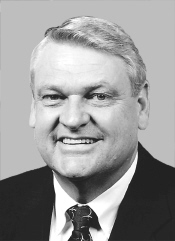

Nominee	Mac Collins	Gail Notti
Party	Republican	Democratic
Popular vote	150,200	86,309
Percentage	63.5%	36.5%
- County results Collins: 50–60% 70–80% Notti: 50–60%
U.S. Representative before election
Mac Collins
Republican
Elected U.S. Representative
Mac Collins
Republican

Incumbent Republican Mac Collins, who was first elected in 1992, ran for re-election. Collins was re-elected with 63.5% of the vote.

=== General election ===
==== Results ====
Georgia's 3rd congressional district election, 2000
Party	Candidate	Votes	%
Republican	Mac Collins (incumbent)	150,200	63.5
Democratic	Gail Notti	86,309	36.5
Write-In	Write-ins	197	0.1
Total votes		236,706	100.0
Republican hold			

== District 4 ==
2000 Georgia's 4th congressional district election
- November 7, 2000
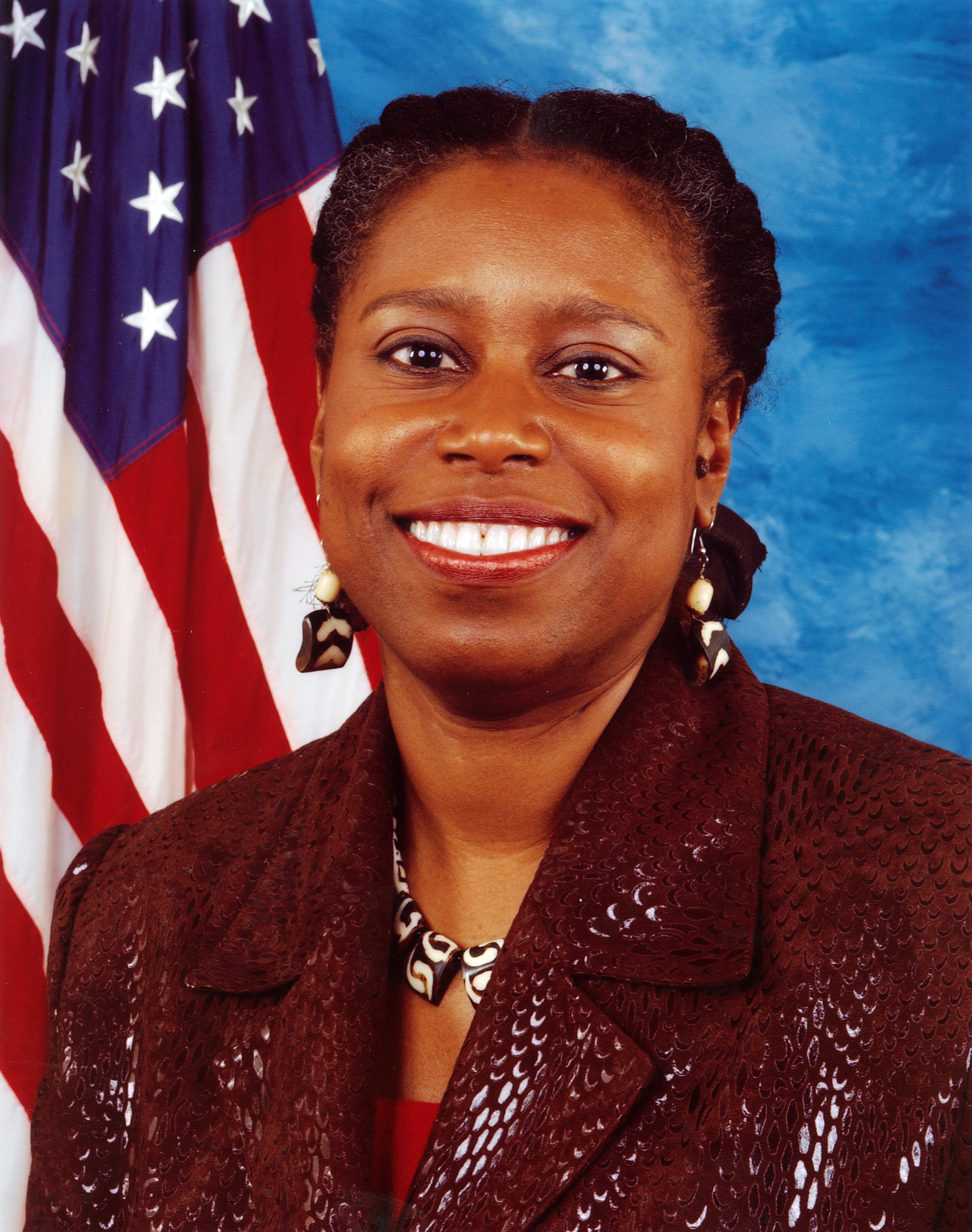

Nominee	Cynthia McKinney	Sunny Warren
Party	Democratic	Republican
Popular vote	139,579	90,277
Percentage	60.7%	39.3%
- County results Mckinney: 60–70% Warren: 50–60%
U.S. Representative before election
Cynthia McKinney
Democratic
Elected U.S. Representative
Cynthia McKinney
Democratic

Incumbent Democrat Cynthia McKinney, who was first elected in 1992, ran for re-election. McKinney was re-elected with 60.7% of the vote.

=== General election ===
==== Results ====
Georgia's 4th congressional district election, 2000
Party	Candidate	Votes	%
Democratic	Cynthia McKinney (incumbent)	139,579	60.7
Republican	Sunny Warren	90,277	39.3
Total votes		229,856	100.0
Democratic hold			

== District 5 ==
2000 Georgia's 5th congressional district election
- November 7, 2000
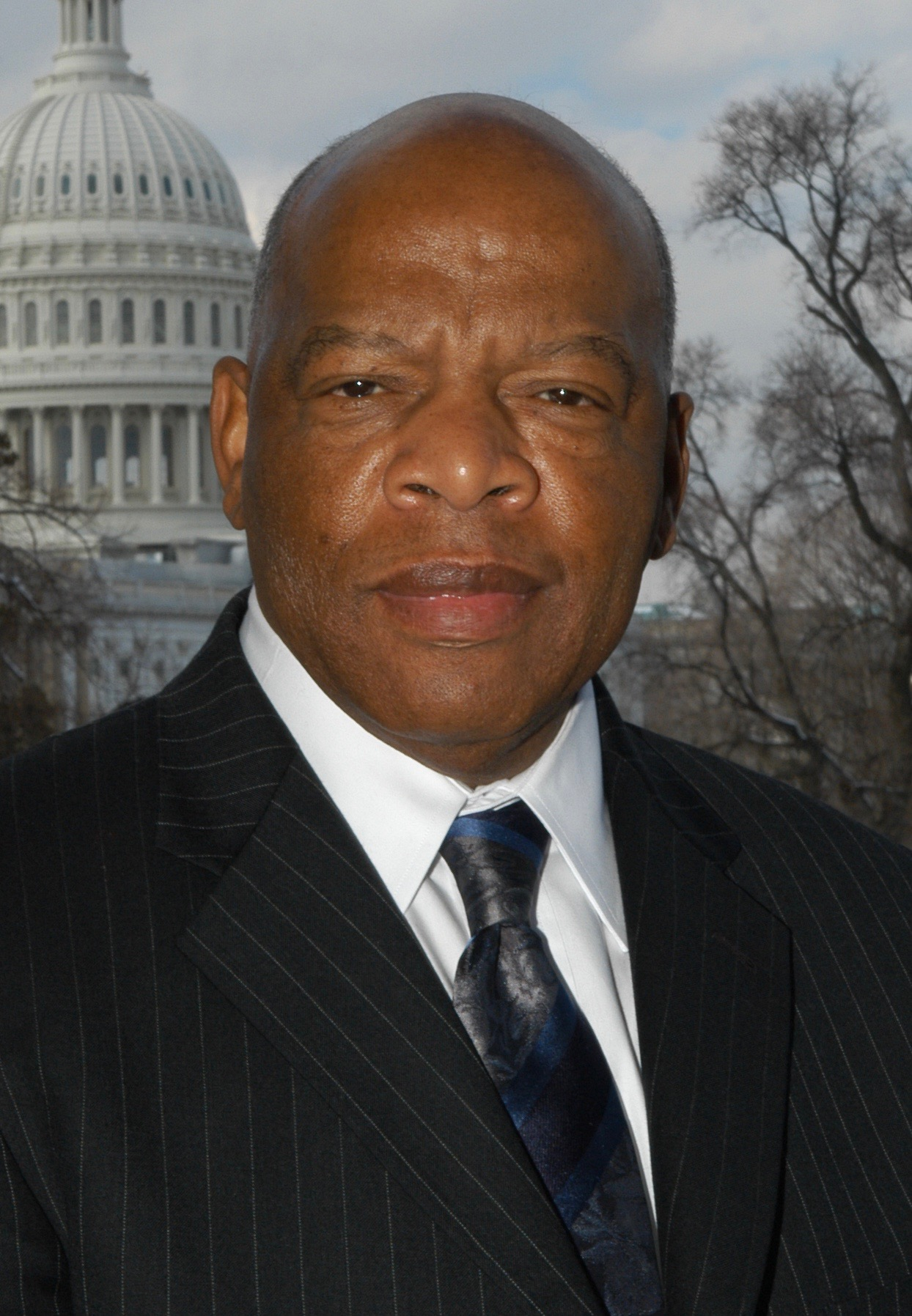

Nominee	John Lewis	Hank Schwab
Party	Democratic	Republican
Popular vote	137,333	40,606
Percentage	77.2%	22.8%
- County results Lewis: 70–80% 80–90%
U.S. Representative before election
John Lewis
Democratic
Elected U.S. Representative
John Lewis
Democratic

Incumbent Democrat John Lewis, who was first elected in 1986, ran for re-election. Lewis was re-elected with 77.2% of the vote.

=== General election ===
==== Results ====
Georgia's 5th congressional district election, 2000
Party	Candidate	Votes	%
Democratic	John Lewis (incumbent)	137,333	77.2
Republican	Hank Schwab	40,606	22.8
Write-In	Write-ins	3	0.0
Total votes		177,942	100.0
Democratic hold			

== District 6 ==
2000 Georgia's 6th congressional district election
- November 7, 2000

Nominee	Johnny Isakson	Brett Dehart
Party	Republican	Democratic
Popular vote	256,595	86,666
Percentage	74.8%	25.2%
- County results Isakson: 70–80% 80–90%
U.S. Representative before election
Johnny Isakson
Republican
Elected U.S. Representative
Johnny Isakson
Republican

Incumbent Republican Johnny Isakson, who was first elected in 1999, ran for re-election. Isakson was re-elected with 74.8% of the vote.

=== General election ===
==== Results ====
Georgia's 6th congressional district election, 2000
Party	Candidate	Votes	%
Republican	Johnny Isakson (incumbent)	256,595	74.8
Democratic	Brett Dehart	86,666	25.2
Total votes		343,261	100.0
Republican hold			

== District 7 ==
2000 Georgia's 7th congressional district election
- November 7, 2000
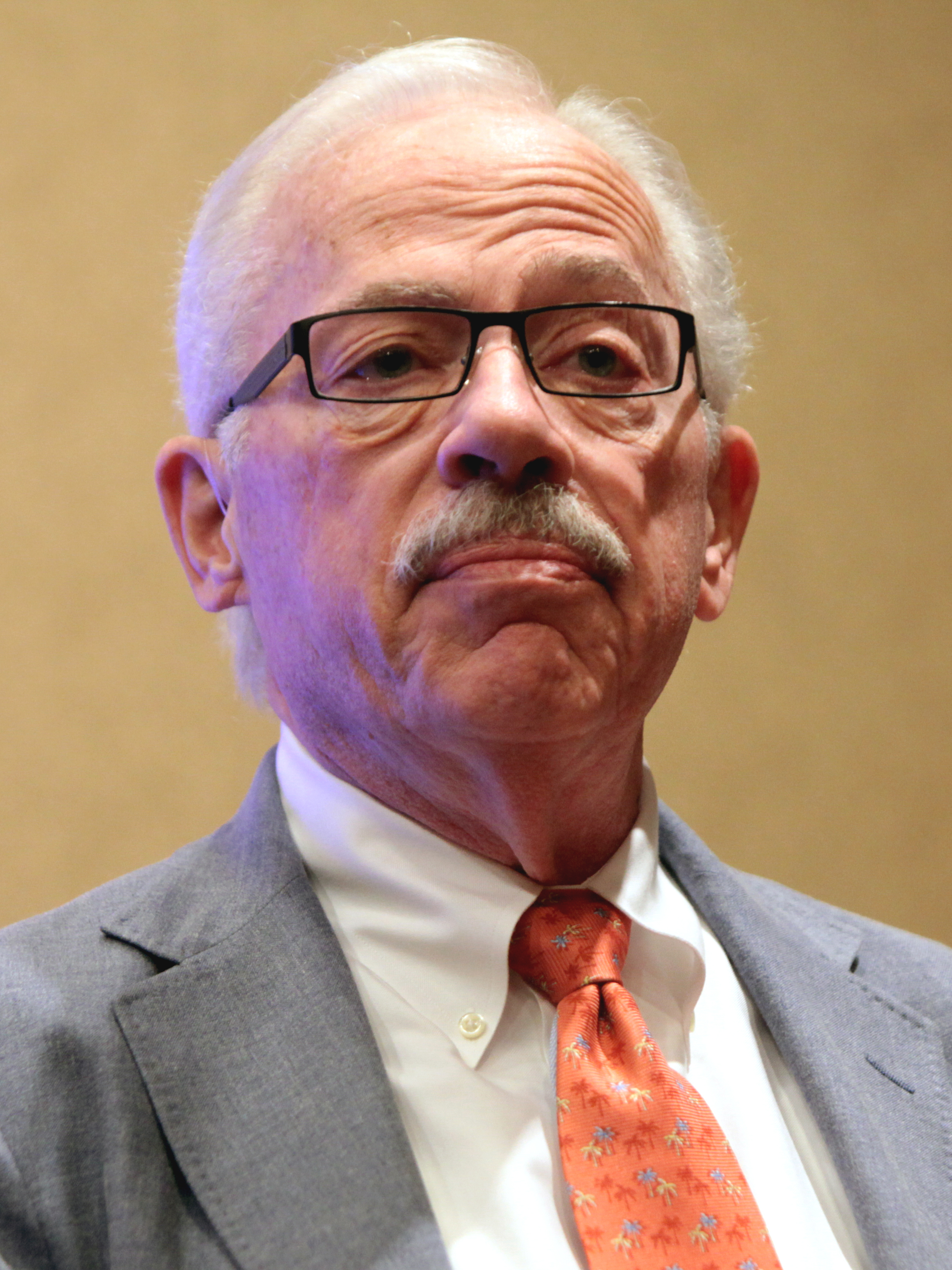

Nominee	Bob Barr	Roger Kahn
Party	Republican	Democratic
Popular vote	126,312	102,272
Percentage	55.3%	44.7%
- County results Barr: 50–60% 60–70% Kahn: 50–60%
U.S. Representative before election
Bob Barr
Republican
Elected U.S. Representative
Bob Barr
Republican

Incumbent Republican Bob Barr, who was first elected in 1994, ran for re-election. Barr was re-elected with 55.3% of the vote.

=== General election ===
==== Results ====
Georgia's 7th congressional district election, 2000
Party	Candidate	Votes	%
Republican	Bob Barr (incumbent)	126,312	55.3
Democratic	Roger Kahn	102,272	44.7
Total votes		228,584	100.0
Republican hold			

== District 8 ==
2000 Georgia's 8th congressional district election
- November 7, 2000
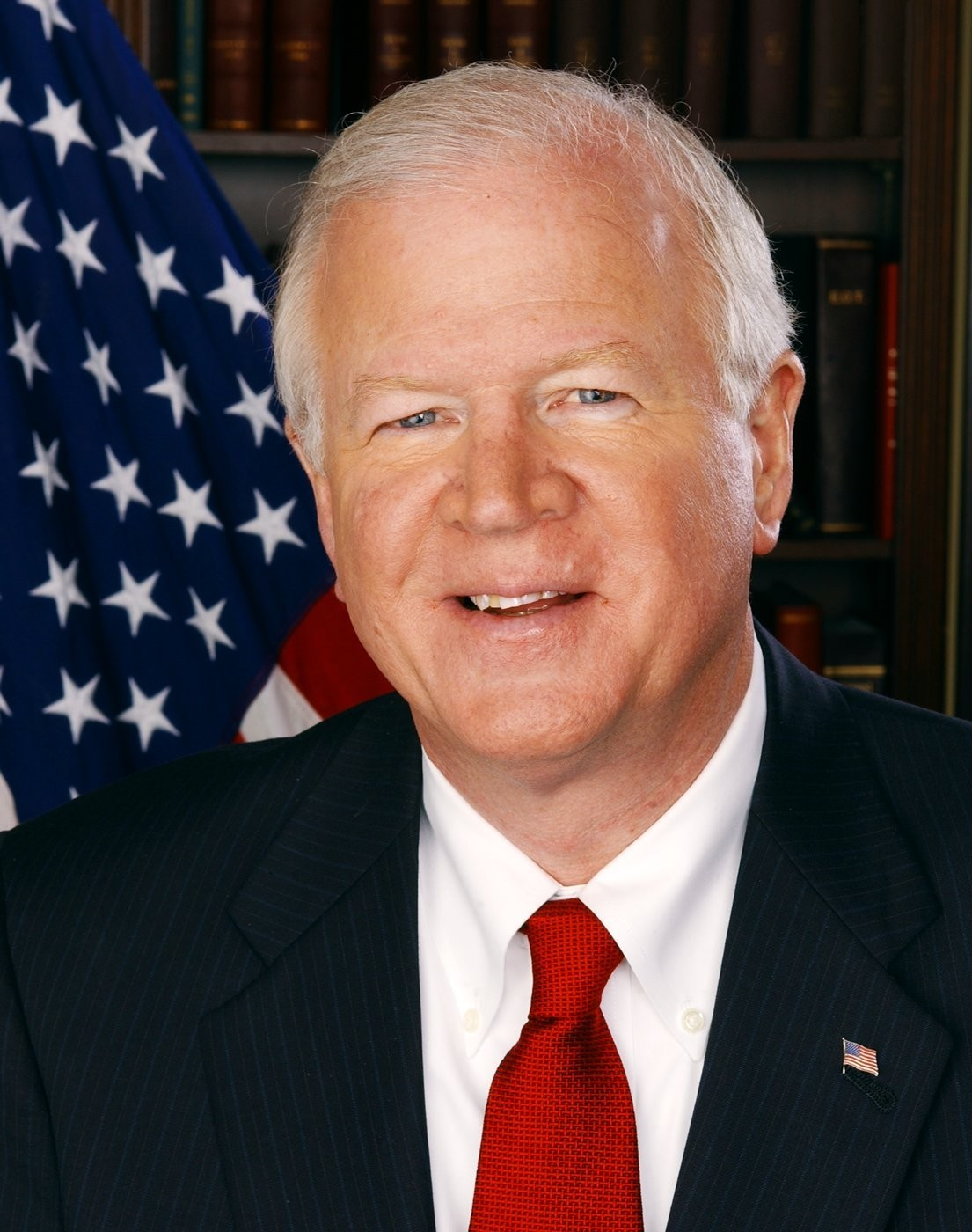

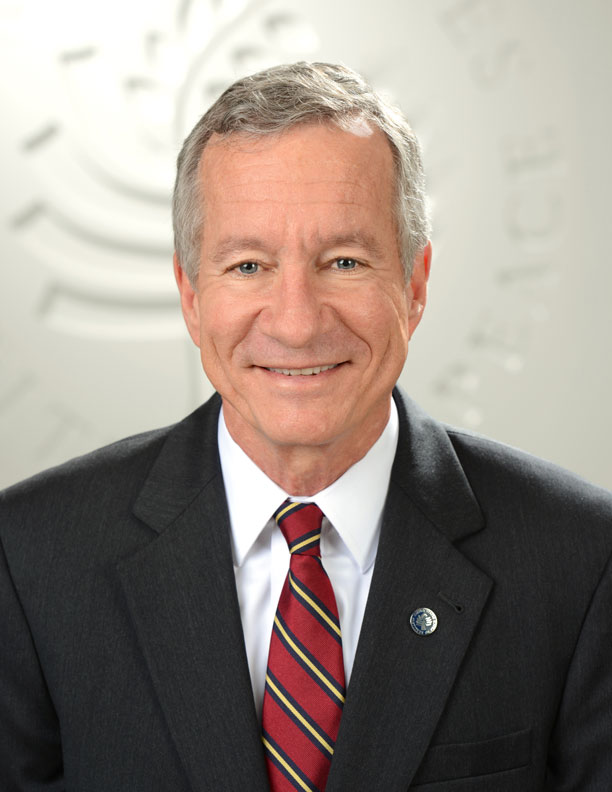
Nominee	Saxby Chambliss	Jim Marshall
Party	Republican	Democratic
Popular vote	113,380	79,051
Percentage	58.9%	41.1%
- County results Chambliss: 50–60% 60–70% 70–80% Marshall: 50–60%
U.S. Representative before election
Saxby Chambliss
Republican
Elected U.S. Representative
Saxby Chambliss
Republican

Incumbent Republican Saxby Chambliss, who was first elected in 1994, ran for re-election. Chambliss was re-elected with 58.9% of the vote.

=== General election ===
==== Results ====
Georgia's 8th congressional district election, 2000
Party	Candidate	Votes	%
Republican	Saxby Chambliss (incumbent)	113,380	58.9
Democratic	Jim Marshall	79,051	41.1
Total votes		192,431	100.0
Republican hold			

== District 9 ==
2000 Georgia's 9th congressional district election
- November 7, 2000
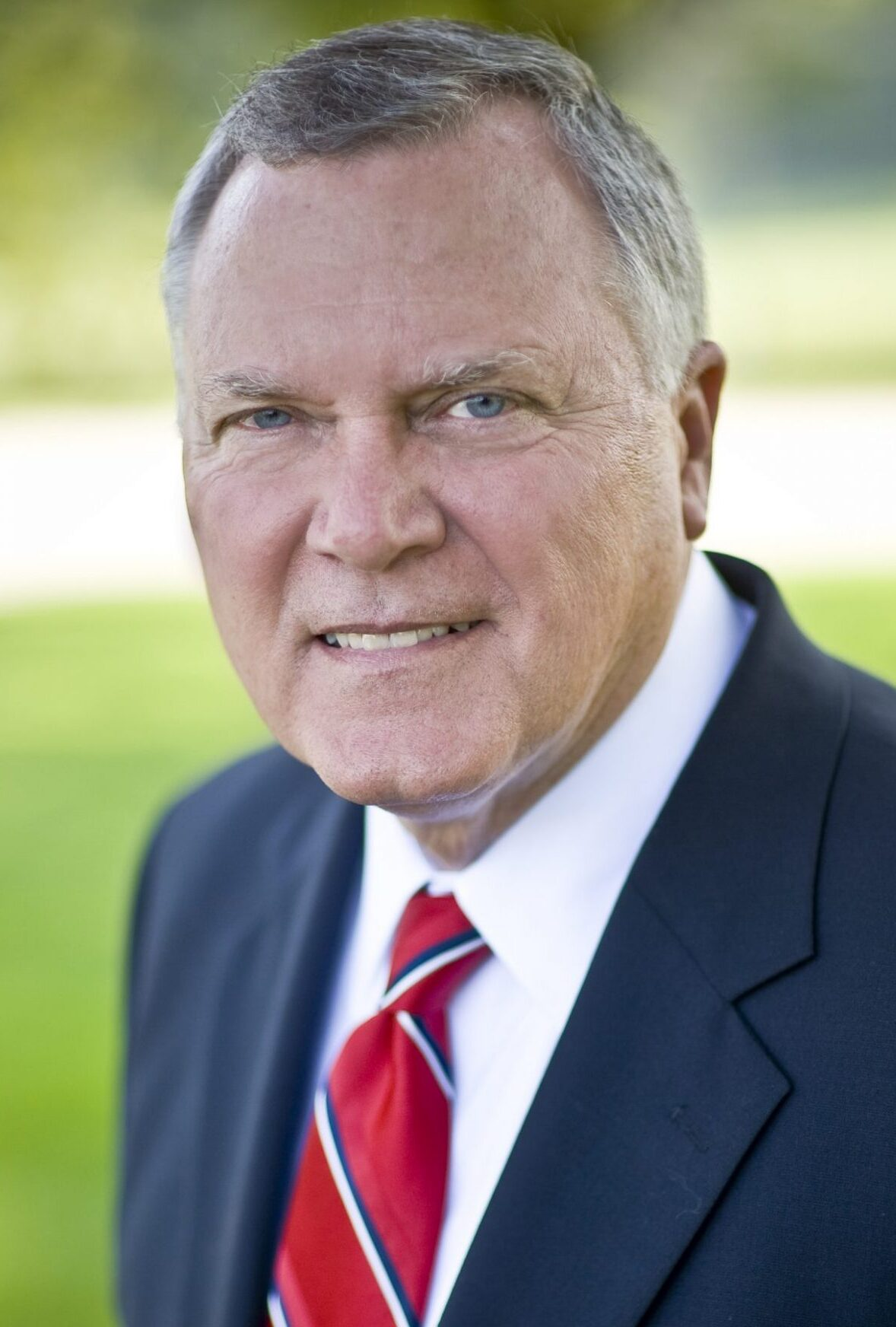

Nominee	Nathan Deal	James Harrington
Party	Republican	Democratic
Popular vote	183,171	60,360
Percentage	75.2%	24.8%
- County results Deal: 60–70% 70–80%
U.S. Representative before election
Nathan Deal
Republican
Elected U.S. Representative
Nathan Deal
Republican

Incumbent Republican Nathan Deal, who was first elected in 1992, ran for re-election. Deal was re-elected with 75.2% of the vote.

=== General election ===
==== Results ====
Georgia's 9th congressional district election, 2000
Party	Candidate	Votes	%
Republican	Nathan Deal (incumbent)	183,171	75.2
Democratic	James Harrington	60,360	24.8
Total votes		243,531	100.0
Republican hold			

== District 10 ==
2000 Georgia's 10th congressional district election
- November 7, 2000
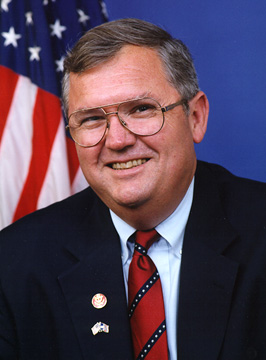

Nominee	Charlie Norwood	Denise Freeman
Party	Republican	Democratic
Popular vote	122,590	71,309
Percentage	63.2%	36.8%
- County results Norwood: 50–60% 60–70% 70–80% 80–90% Freeman: 60–70%
U.S. Representative before election
Charlie Norwood
Republican
Elected U.S. Representative
Charlie Norwood
Republican

Incumbent Republican Charlie Norwood, who was first elected in 1994, ran for re-election. Norwood was re-elected with 63.2% of the vote.

=== General election ===
==== Results ====
Georgia's 10th congressional district election, 2000
Party	Candidate	Votes	%
Republican	Charlie Norwood (incumbent)	122,590	63.2
Democratic	Denise Freeman	71,309	36.8
Total votes		193,899	100.0
Republican hold			

== District 11 ==
2000 Georgia's 11th congressional district election
- November 7, 2000
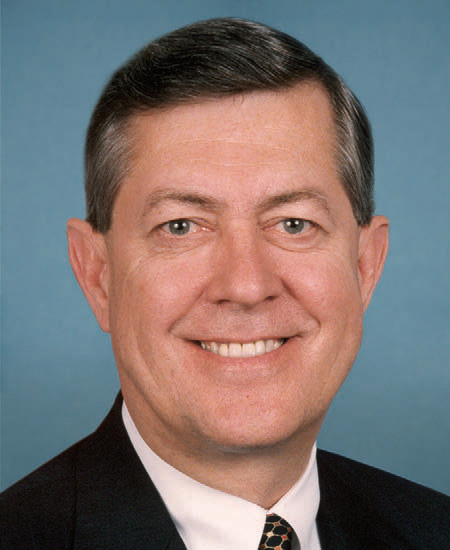
Nominee	John Linder
Party	Republican
Popular vote	199,652
Percentage	100.0%
U.S. Representative before election
John Linder
Republican
Elected U.S. Representative
John Linder
Republican

Incumbent Republican John Linder, who was first elected in 1992, ran for re-election. Linder was re-elected unopposed.

=== General election ===
==== Results ====
Georgia's 11th congressional district election, 2000
Party	Candidate	Votes	%
Republican	John Linder (incumbent)	199,652	100.0
Total votes		199,652	100.0
Republican hold			
