= 1998 United States House of Representatives elections in Georgia =

- November 3, 1998

All 11 Georgia seats to the United States House of Representatives
	Majority party	Minority party
Party	Republican	Democratic
Seats before	8	3
Seats won	8	3
Seat change	Steady	Steady
Popular vote	1,039,711	592,004
Percentage	63.72%	36.28%
Swing	▲10.46%	▼10.52%

Republican
50–60%
60–70%
70–80%
80–90%
>90%
Democratic
50–60%
60–70%
70–80%

The 1998 House elections in Georgia occurred on November 3, 1998, to elect the members of the State of Georgia's delegation to the United States House of Representatives. Georgia had eleven seats in the House, apportioned according to the 1990 United States census.

These elections were held concurrently with the United States Senate elections of 1998 (including one election in Georgia), the United States House elections in other states, and various state and local elections.

== Overview ==
United States House of Representatives elections in Georgia, 1998
Party	Votes	Percentage	Seats before	Seats after	+/–
Republican	1,039,711	63.719%	8	8	±0
Democratic	592,004	36.281%	3	3	±0
Others	0	0.0%	0	0	
Valid votes	-	-%			
Invalid or blank votes	-	-%			
Totals	1,631,715	100.00%	11	11	-
Voter turnout					

== Results ==
District	Incumbent	Party	Elected	Status	Result
Georgia's 1st	Jack Kingston	Republican	1992	Re-elected	Jack Kingston (R) unopposed
Georgia's 2nd	Sanford Bishop	Democratic	1992	Re-elected	Sanford Bishop (D) 57% Joseph McCormick (R) 43%
Georgia's 3rd	Mac Collins	Republican	1992	Re-elected	Mac Collins (R) unopposed
Georgia's 4th	Cynthia McKinney	Democratic	1992	Re-elected	Cynthia McKinney (D) 61% Sunny Warren (R) 39%
Georgia's 5th	John Lewis	Democratic	1986	Re-elected	John Lewis (D) 79% John Lewis Sr. (R) 21%
Georgia's 6th	Newt Gingrich	Republican	1978	Re-elected	Newt Gingrich (R) 71% Gary Pelphrey (D) 29%
Georgia's 7th	Bob Barr	Republican	1994	Re-elected	Bob Barr (R) 55% James Williams (D) 45%
Georgia's 8th	Saxby Chambliss	Republican	1994	Re-elected	Saxby Chambliss (R) 62% Ronald Cain (D) 38%
Georgia's 9th	Nathan Deal	Republican	1992	Re-elected	Nathan Deal (R) unopposed
Georgia's 10th	Charlie Norwood	Republican	1994	Re-elected	Charlie Norwood (R) 59% Marion Freeman (D) 41%
Georgia's 11th	John Linder	Republican	1992	Re-elected	John Linder (R) 69% Vince Littman (D) 31%
