= 2018 Georgia Attorney General election =

- November 6, 2018
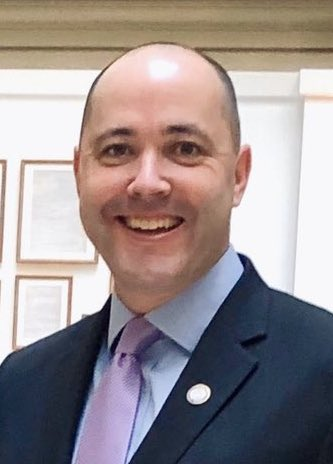

Candidate	Chris Carr	Charlie Bailey
Party	Republican	Democratic
Popular vote	1,981,563	1,800,807
Percentage	51.30%	48.70%
- Carr: 40–50% 50–60% 60–70% 70–80% 80–90% >90% Bailey: 40–50% 50–60% 60–70% 70–80% 80–90% >90% No data
Attorney General before election
Chris Carr
Republican
Elected Attorney General
Chris Carr
Republican

The 2018 Georgia attorney general election was held on November 6, 2018, to elect the attorney general of Georgia. Incumbent Republican attorney general Christopher M. Carr was appointed to the office on November 1, 2016, after Sam Olens resigned to become the president of Kennesaw State University. Carr won the election to a full term over Democrat Charlie Bailey with 51.3% of the vote.

== Republican primary ==
- Chris Carr, incumbent

Republican primary results
Party	Candidate	Votes	%
Republican	Chris Carr (incumbent)	475,122	100.00%
Total votes		475,122	100.00%

== Democratic primary ==
- Charlie Bailey, former Fulton County senior assistant district attorney

Democratic primary results
Party	Candidate	Votes	%
Democratic	Charlie Bailey	456,105	100.00%
Total votes		456,105	100.00%

== General election ==
=== Predictions ===
Source	Ranking	As of
Governing	Lean R	October 26, 2018

=== Results ===
2018 Georgia attorney general election
Party	Candidate	Votes	%
Republican	Chris Carr (incumbent)	1,981,563	51.30%
Democratic	Charlie Bailey	1,880,807	48.70%
Total votes		3,862,370	100.00%
Republican hold			

=== Results by congressional district ===
Carr won ten of 14 congressional districts, including one that elected a Democrat.

District	Carr	Bailey	Representative
1st	57%	43%	Buddy Carter
2nd	44%	56%	Sanford Bishop
3rd	64%	36%	Drew Ferguson
4th	21%	79%	Hank Johnson
5th	14%	86%	John Lewis
6th	50.4%	49.6%	Lucy McBath
7th	50.4%	49.6%	Rob Woodall
8th	64%	36%	Austin Scott
9th	79%	21%	Doug Collins
10th	62%	38%	Jody Hice
11th	61%	39%	Barry Loudermilk
12th	58%	42%	Rick W. Allen
13th	24%	76%	David Scott
14th	75%	25%	Tom Graves

== See also ==
- 2018 Georgia state elections
