= Georgia's congressional districts =

Political subdivisions of Georgia (U.S. state)

Map of Georgia's congressional districts from 2023 to 2025 Interactive map version

Map of Georgia's congressional districts from 2025 Interactive map version

Georgia is represented in the United States House of Representatives by 14 elected representatives, each campaigning and receiving votes in only one district of the 14.

After the 2000 census, the State of Georgia was divided into 13 congressional districts, increasing from 11 due to reapportionment. The state was redistricted again in 2005 and 2007, although the number of districts remained 13. In 2013, the number of representatives increased again to 14 members.

== Current districts and representatives ==
This is a list of United States representatives from Georgia, their time in office, district maps, and the district political ratings according to the CPVI. The delegation has a total of 14 members, with nine Republicans and five Democrats since September 6, 2026.

Current U.S. representatives from Georgia
District	Member (Residence)	Party	Incumbent since	CPVI (2025)	District map
1st	Buddy Carter (St. Simons)	Republican	January 3, 2015	R+8	
2nd	Sanford Bishop (Albany)	Democratic	January 3, 1993	D+4	
3rd	Brian Jack (Peachtree City)	Republican	January 3, 2025	R+15	
4th	Hank Johnson (Lithonia)	Democratic	January 3, 2007	D+27	
5th	Nikema Williams (Atlanta)	Democratic	January 3, 2021	D+36	
6th	Lucy McBath (Marietta)	Democratic	January 3, 2019	D+25	
7th	Rich McCormick (Suwanee)	Republican	January 3, 2023	R+11	
8th	Austin Scott (Tifton)	Republican	January 3, 2011	R+15	
9th	Andrew Clyde (Athens)	Republican	January 3, 2021	R+17	
10th	Mike Collins (Jackson)	Republican	January 3, 2023	R+11	
11th	Barry Loudermilk (Cassville)	Republican	January 3, 2015	R+12	
12th	Rick Allen (Augusta)	Republican	January 3, 2015	R+7	
13th	Everton Blair (Lilburn)	Democratic	August 25, 2026	D+21	
14th	Clay Fuller (Lookout Mountain)	Republican	April 7, 2026	R+19	

== Historical and present district boundaries ==
Table of United States congressional district boundary maps in the State of Georgia, presented chronologically. All redistricting events that took place in Georgia between 1973 and 2013 are shown.

Year	Statewide map	Atlanta highlight
1973–1982		
1983–1992		
1993–1996		
1997–2002		
2003–2006		
2007–2013		
2013–2023		

== See also ==
- List of United States congressional districts
- List of Georgia House of Representatives districts
- List of Georgia State Senate districts
