= Richard Ray =

American politician

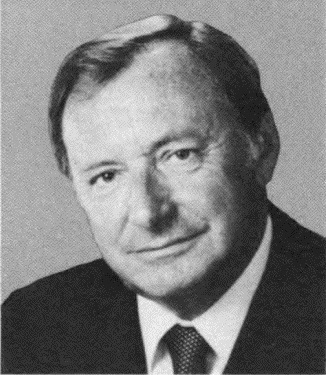

Member of the U.S. House of Representatives from Georgia's 3rd district
- In office January 3, 1983 – January 3, 1993
- Preceded by: Jack Brinkley
- Succeeded by: Mac Collins

Mayor of Perry, Georgia
- In office 1964–1970

Personal details
- Born: Richard Belmont Ray; February 2, 1927 Fort Valley, Georgia, U.S.
- Died: May 29, 1999 (aged 72) Macon, Georgia, U.S.
- Party: Democratic

Military service
- Allegiance: United States
- Branch/service: United States Navy
- Years of service: 1944–1946

Richard Belmont Ray (February 2, 1927 – May 29, 1999) was an American politician who served as a member of the United States House of Representatives for Georgia's 3rd congressional district from 1983 to 1993.

== Early life ==
Ray was born in Fort Valley, Georgia, and graduated from Crawford County High School in Roberta, Georgia, in 1944.

== Career ==
After graduating from high school, Ray served in the United States Navy during World War II, from 1944 to 1946. After the war, Ray worked as a farmer and local businessman before serving as mayor of Perry, Georgia, from 1964 to 1970. During that time, Sam Nunn was city attorney, and after Nunn's election to the United States Senate in 1972, Ray became Nunn's administrative assistant.

In 1982, Ray was elected as a Democrat to the United States House of Representatives representing Georgia's 3rd congressional district. He was re-elected to that position four times.

After the 1990 Census, Georgia gained a new congressional district. The Democratic-controlled Georgia General Assembly dismantled Georgia's 6th congressional district and shifted much of the southern portion of Newt Gingrich's old territory into Ray's Columbus-based district. However, the new district was considerably more urban and Republican than Ray's old district. Ray lost to Republican state Senator Mac Collins, a resident of the former Gingrich territory, by almost 10 points.

== Personal life ==
After his congressional service, Ray resided in both Byron, Georgia and Alexandria, Virginia. He died in Macon, Georgia in 1999.

U.S. House of Representatives
Preceded by Jack Thomas Brinkley	Member of the U.S. House of Representatives from Georgia's 3rd congressional district January 3, 1983 – January 3, 1993	Succeeded by Mac Collins
