= Ed Jenkins (politician) =

American politician (1933–2012)

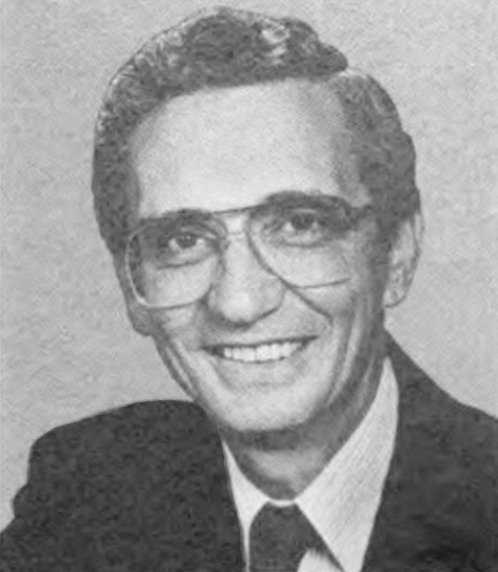

Member of the U.S. House of Representatives from Georgia's 9th district
- In office January 3, 1977 – January 3, 1993
- Preceded by: Phillip M. Landrum
- Succeeded by: Nathan Deal

Personal details
- Born: Edgar Lanier Jenkins; January 4, 1933 Young Harris, Georgia, U.S.
- Died: January 1, 2012 (aged 78) Atlanta, Georgia, U.S.
- Party: Democratic
- Education: University of Georgia

Edgar Lanier Jenkins (January 4, 1933 – January 1, 2012) was an American politician who served eight terms as the U.S. representative for Georgia's 9th congressional district from 1977 to 1993. He was a member of the Democratic Party.

== Biography ==
Jenkins, who was born in Young Harris, Georgia, served in the Coast Guard from 1952 to 1955, and as administrative assistant to congressman Phillip M. Landrum from 1959 to 1962.

=== Congress ===
He was elected to Congress in 1976. He supported protection for the textile industry and capital gains tax cuts. In 1989, he challenged Dick Gephardt for Majority Leader but lost by a margin of 76 to 181 votes.

=== Death ===
He left Congress in 1993. Jenkins died in 2012, aged 78.

U.S. House of Representatives
Preceded by Phillip M. Landrum	Member of the U.S. House of Representatives from Georgia's 9th congressional district January 3, 1977 – January 3, 1993	Succeeded by Nathan Deal
