= Georgia's 11th congressional district =

U.S. House district for Georgia

Coordinates: 34°6′58.87″N 85°4′21.47″W

- Interactive map of district boundaries from January 3, 2025
- Representative: Barry Loudermilk; R–Cassville
- Distribution: 96.1% urban; 3.9% rural
- Population (2025): 811,360
- Median household income: $102,490
- Ethnicity: 66.7% White; 12.1% Hispanic; 11.4% Black; 4.6% Two or more races; 4.1% Asian; 1.0% other
- Cook PVI: R+12

Georgia's 11th congressional district is a congressional district in the U.S. state of Georgia. The district is currently represented by Republican Barry Loudermilk. The district's boundaries have been redrawn following the 2010 census, which granted an additional congressional seat to Georgia. The district was redrawn again in 2023, effective for the 2024 election cycle, as well as redrawn again in 2025. (Note: The new map became effective on January 3rd, 2025.)

Located in the northwestern portion of the Atlanta metropolitan area, the district covers the entirety of Bartow, Gordon, and Pickens counties, as well as western Cherokee County, and northwestern and central Cobb County. It includes Adairsville, Calhoun, Canton, Cartersville, Kennesaw, Woodstock and most of Marietta.

After 2023, the district no longer includes northern Fulton County.

== Composition ==
For the 119th and successive Congresses (based on the districts drawn following a 2023 court order), the district contains all or portions of the following counties and communities.

Bartow County (7)

All seven communities

Cherokee County (5)

Canton, Holly Springs (part; also 7th), Mountain Park (part; also 7th; shared with Fulton County), Waleska, Woodstock

Cobb County (4)

Fair Oaks (part; also 6th), Kennesaw (part; also 14th), Kennesaw State University, Marietta (part; also 6th)

Gordon County (5)

All five communities

Pickens County (3)

All three communities

== Recent election results from statewide races ==
Year	Office	Results
2008	President	McCain 66% - 33%
2012	President	Romney 71% - 29%
2016	President	Trump 63% - 32%
2016	Senate	Isakson 67% - 27%
2018	Governor	Kemp 63% - 36%
2018	Lt. Governor	Duncan 64% - 36%
2018	Attorney General	Carr 64% - 36%
2020	President	Trump 60% - 38%
2021	Senate (Reg.)	Perdue 62% - 38%
2021	Senate (Spec.)	Loeffler 61% - 39%
2022	Senate	Walker 60% - 40%
2022	Governor	Kemp 66% - 33%
2022	Lt. Governor	Jones 63% - 35%
2022	Secretary of State	Raffensperger 65% - 32%
2022	Attorney General	Carr 64% - 35%
2024	President	Trump 61% - 38%

== List of members representing the district ==
Member	Party	Years	Cong ress	Electoral history	Historical boundaries
District created March 4, 1893
Henry G. Turner (Quitman)	Democratic	March 4, 1893 – March 3, 1897	53rd 54th	Redistricted from the 2nd district and re-elected in 1892. Re-elected in 1894.	1893–1913 [data missing]
William G. Brantley (Brunswick)	Democratic	March 4, 1897 – March 3, 1913	55th 56th 57th 58th 59th 60th 61st 62nd	Elected in 1896. Re-elected in 1898. Re-elected in 1900. Re-elected in 1902. Re-elected in 1904. Re-elected in 1906. Re-elected in 1908. Re-elected in 1910. Retired.	1893–1913 [data missing]
John R. Walker (Valdosta)	Democratic	March 4, 1913 – March 3, 1919	63rd 64th 65th	Elected in 1912. Re-elected in 1914. Re-elected in 1916. Retired.	1913–1933 [data missing]
William C. Lankford (Douglas)	Democratic	March 4, 1919 – March 3, 1933	66th 67th 68th 69th 70th 71st 72nd	Elected in 1918. Re-elected in 1920. Re-elected in 1922. Re-elected in 1924. Re-elected in 1926. Re-elected in 1928. Re-elected in 1930.	1913–1933 [data missing]
District eliminated March 3, 1933
District re-established January 3, 1993
Cynthia McKinney (Lithonia)	Democratic	January 3, 1993 – January 3, 1997	103rd 104th	Elected in 1992. Re-elected in 1994. Redistricted to the 4th district.	1993–2003 [data missing]
John Linder (Atlanta)	Republican	January 3, 1997 – January 3, 2003	105th 106th 107th	Redistricted from the 4th district and re-elected in 1996. Re-elected in 1998. Re-elected in 2000. Redistricted to the 7th district.	1993–2003 [data missing]
Phil Gingrey (Marietta)	Republican	January 3, 2003 – January 3, 2015	108th 109th 110th 111th 112th 113th	Elected in 2002. Re-elected in 2004. Re-elected in 2006. Re-elected in 2008. Re-elected in 2010. Re-elected in 2012. Retired to run for U.S. senator.	2003–2009; Chattooga, Floyd, Haralson, Heard, Meriwether, Polk, Talbot counties and parts of Bartow, Carroll, Cobb, Coweta, Douglas, Harris, Muscogee, Paulding, Troup, Upson counties
Phil Gingrey (Marietta)	Republican	January 3, 2003 – January 3, 2015	108th 109th 110th 111th 112th 113th	Elected in 2002. Re-elected in 2004. Re-elected in 2006. Re-elected in 2008. Re-elected in 2010. Re-elected in 2012. Retired to run for U.S. senator.	2009–2013; Bartow, Chattooga, Floyd, Haralson, and Polk counties; parts of Carroll, Cobb, and Gordon counties
Phil Gingrey (Marietta)	Republican	January 3, 2003 – January 3, 2015	108th 109th 110th 111th 112th 113th	Elected in 2002. Re-elected in 2004. Re-elected in 2006. Re-elected in 2008. Re-elected in 2010. Re-elected in 2012. Retired to run for U.S. senator.	2013–2023; Bartow and Cherokee counties and parts of Cobb and Fulton counties
Barry Loudermilk (Cassville)	Republican	January 3, 2015 – present	114th 115th 116th 117th 118th 119th	Elected in 2014. Re-elected in 2016. Re-elected in 2018. Re-elected in 2020. Re-elected in 2022. Re-elected in 2024. Retiring at the end of term.	2013–2023; Bartow and Cherokee counties and parts of Cobb and Fulton counties
Barry Loudermilk (Cassville)	Republican	January 3, 2015 – present	114th 115th 116th 117th 118th 119th	Elected in 2014. Re-elected in 2016. Re-elected in 2018. Re-elected in 2020. Re-elected in 2022. Re-elected in 2024. Retiring at the end of term.	2023–2025; Bartow and Pickens counties; parts of Cherokee and Cobb counties
Barry Loudermilk (Cassville)	Republican	January 3, 2015 – present	114th 115th 116th 117th 118th 119th	Elected in 2014. Re-elected in 2016. Re-elected in 2018. Re-elected in 2020. Re-elected in 2022. Re-elected in 2024. Retiring at the end of term.	2025–present Bartow, Gordon, and Pickens counties; parts of Cherokee and Cobb counties
John Cowan (Rome)	Republican	Assuming office on January 3, 2027		Elected in 2026.	2025–present Bartow, Gordon, and Pickens counties; parts of Cherokee and Cobb counties

== Election results ==
=== 2016 ===
Georgia's 11th congressional district, 2016
Party	Candidate	Votes	%
Republican	Barry Loudermilk (incumbent)	217,935	67.4
Democratic	Don Wilson	105,383	32.6
Total votes		323,318	100.0
Republican hold			

=== 2018 ===
Georgia's 11th congressional district, 2018
Party	Candidate	Votes	%
Republican	Barry Loudermilk (incumbent)	191,887	61.8
Democratic	Flynn D. Broady	118,653	38.2
Total votes		310,540	100.0
Republican hold			

=== 2020 ===
Georgia's 11th congressional district, 2020
Party	Candidate	Votes	%
Republican	Barry Loudermilk (incumbent)	245,256	60.4
Democratic	Dana Barrett	160,623	39.6
Total votes		405,882	100.0
Republican hold			

=== 2022 ===
Georgia's 11th congressional district, 2022
Party	Candidate	Votes	%
Republican	Barry Loudermilk (incumbent)	190,086	62.6
Democratic	Antonio Daza-Fernandez	113,571	37.4
Total votes		303,657	100.0
Republican hold			

=== 2024 ===
Georgia's 11th congressional district, 2024
Party	Candidate	Votes	%
Republican	Barry Loudermilk (incumbent)	269,849	65.63
Democratic	Kate Stamper	131,064	31.88
Democratic	Tracey Verhoeven (write in)	10,226	2.49
Total votes		411,139	100.0
Republican hold			
