= 2012 United States House of Representatives elections in Georgia =

- November 6, 2012

All 14 Georgia seats to the United States House of Representatives
	Majority party	Minority party
Party	Republican	Democratic
Last election	8	5
Seats won	9	5
Seat change	▲1	Steady
Popular vote	2,104,098	1,448,869
Percentage	59.21%	40.77%
Swing	▼2.69%	▲2.68%

Republican hold Republican gain
Democratic hold
Republican
50–60%
60–70%
70–80%
80–90%
90–100%
Democratic
50–60%
60–70%
70–80%
80–90%

The 2012 United States House of Representatives elections in Georgia were held on Tuesday, November 6, 2012, and elected the 14 U.S. Representatives from the state, one from each of the state's 14 congressional districts, an increase of one seat following the 2010 United States census. The elections coincided with the elections of other federal and state offices, including a quadrennial presidential election. The party primary elections were held on July 31, 2012, and the run-off on August 21, 2012.

The new congressional map, drawn and passed by the Republican-controlled Georgia General Assembly, was signed into law by Governor Nathan Deal on September 7, 2011. The new district, numbered the 9th, is based in Hall County. The map also made the 12th district, then represented by Democrat John Barrow, much more favorable to Republicans.

== Overview ==
United States House of Representatives elections in Georgia, 2012
Party	Votes	Percentage	Seats before	Seats after	+/–
Republican	2,104,098	59.2%	8	9	+1
Democratic	1,448,869	40.8%	5	5	±0
Others	611	0.0%	0	0	-
Totals	3,553,578	100.00%	13	14	+1

=== By district ===
Results of the 2012 United States House of Representatives elections in Georgia by district:

District	Republican		Democratic		Others		Total		Result
District	Votes	%	Votes	%	Votes	%	Votes	%	Result
District 1	157,181	62.98%	92,399	37.02%	0	0.00%	249,580	100.00%	Republican hold
District 2	92,410	36.22%	162,751	63.78%	0	0.00%	255,161	100.00%	Democratic hold
District 3	232,380	99.95%	0	0.00%	105	0.05%	232,485	100.00%	Republican hold
District 4	75,041	26.43%	208,861	73.55%	60	0.02%	283,962	100.00%	Democratic hold
District 5	43,335	15.61%	234,330	84.39%	15	0.01%	277,680	100.00%	Democratic hold
District 6	189,669	64.51%	104,365	35.49%	0	0.00%	294,034	100.00%	Republican hold
District 7	156,689	62.16%	95,377	37.84%	0	0.00%	252,066	100.00%	Republican hold
District 8	197,789	100.00%	0	0.00%	0	0.00%	197,789	100.00%	Republican hold
District 9	192,101	76.18%	60,052	23.82%	0	0.00%	252,153	100.00%	Republican hold
District 10	211,065	99.81%	0	0.00%	401	0.19%	211,065	100.00%	Republican hold
District 11	196,968	68.55%	90,353	31.44%	30	0.01%	287,321	100.00%	Republican hold
District 12	119,973	46.30%	139,148	53.70%	0	0.00%	259,121	100.00%	Democratic hold
District 13	79,550	28.26%	201,988	71.74%	0	0.00%	281,538	100.00%	Democratic hold
District 14	159,947	72.97%	59,245	27.03%	0	0.00%	219,192	100.00%	Republican hold
Total	2,104,098	59.21%	1,448,869	40.77%	611	0.02%	3,553,578	100.00%	

== District 1 ==
2012 Georgia's 1st congressional district election
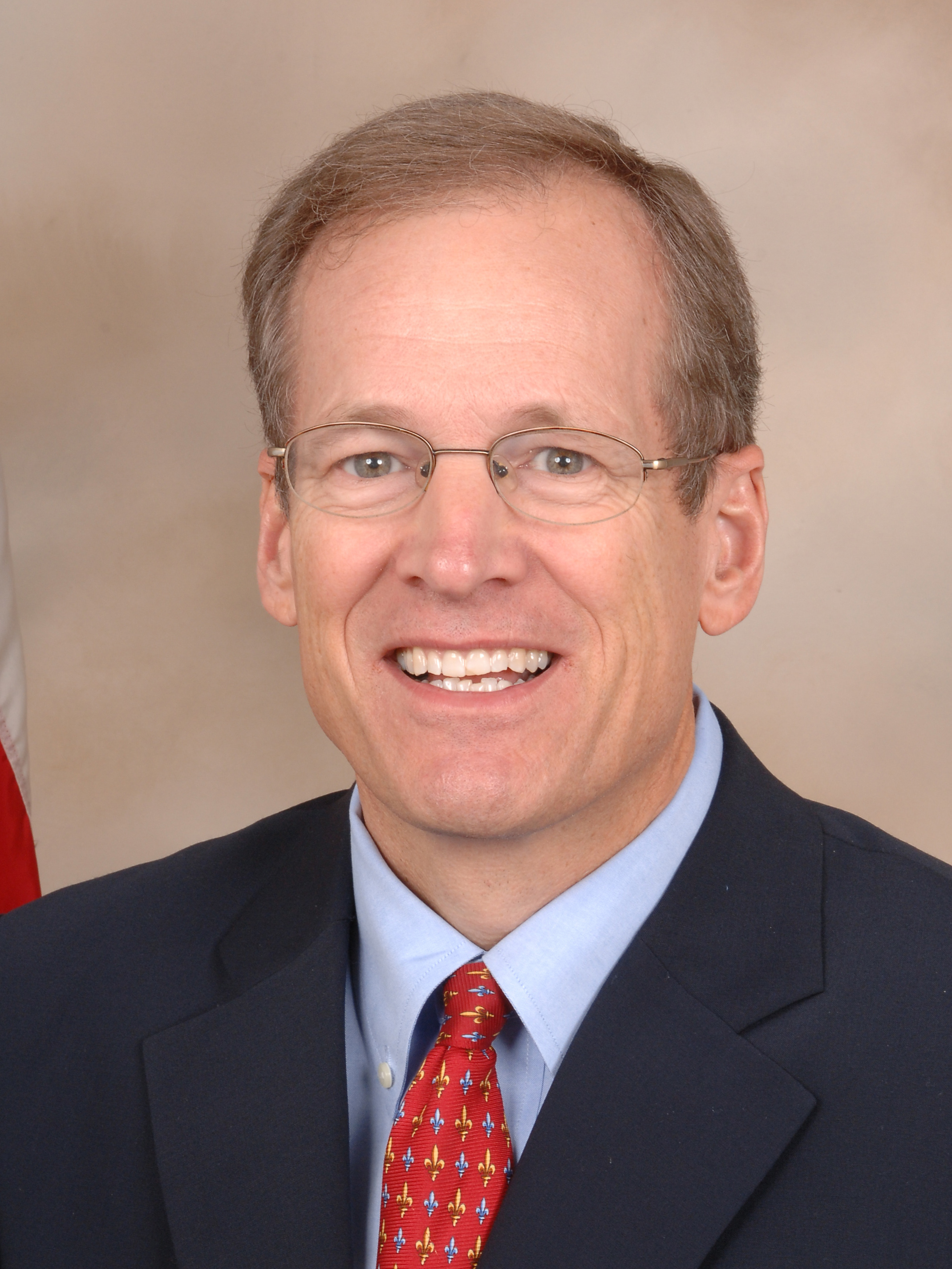

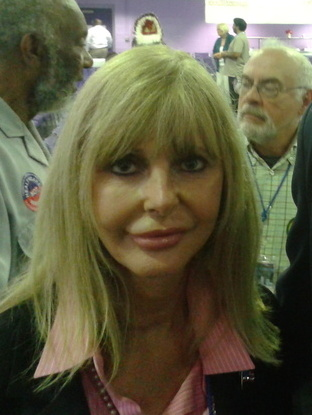
Nominee	Jack Kingston	Lesli Messinger
Party	Republican	Democratic
Popular vote	157,181	92,399
Percentage	63.0%	37.0%
- Kingston: 50–60% 60–70% 70–80% 80–90% >90% Messinger: 50–60% 60–70% 70–80% 80–90% Tie: 50% No votes
U.S. Representative before election
Jack Kingston
Republican
Elected U.S. Representative
Jack Kingston
Republican

Republican incumbent Jack Kingston, who had represented Georgia's 1st congressional district since 1993, ran for re-election.

=== Republican primary ===
==== Candidates ====
===== Nominee =====
- Jack Kingston, incumbent U.S. representative

==== Primary results ====
Republican primary results
Party	Candidate	Votes	%
Republican	Jack Kingston (incumbent)	61,353	100.0
Total votes		61,353	100.0

=== Democratic primary ===
==== Candidates ====
===== Nominee =====
- Lesli Rae Messinger, businesswoman,

===== Eliminated in primary =====
- Nathan Russo, retired businessman

==== Primary results ====
Democratic primary results
Party	Candidate	Votes	%
Democratic	Lesli Rae Messinger	15,390	54.3
Democratic	Nathan C. Russo	55,880	45.7
Total votes		28,342	100.0

=== General election ===
==== Endorsements ====
Jack Kingston (R)

Organizations

- Campaign for Working Families
- National Right to Life Committee
- NRA Political Victory Fund
- United States Chamber of Commerce
Lesli Messinger (D)

Organizations

- Progressive Democrats of America

==== Predictions ====
Source	Ranking	As of
The Cook Political Report	Safe R	November 5, 2012
Rothenberg	Safe R	November 2, 2012
Roll Call	Safe R	November 4, 2012
Sabato's Crystal Ball	Safe R	November 5, 2012
NY Times	Safe R	November 4, 2012
RCP	Safe R	November 4, 2012
The Hill	Safe R	November 4, 2012

==== Results ====
Georgia's 1st congressional district, 2012
Party	Candidate	Votes	%
Republican	Jack Kingston (incumbent)	157,181	63.0
Democratic	Lesli Messinger	92,399	37.0
Total votes		249,580	100.0
Republican hold			

== District 2 ==
2012 Georgia's 2nd congressional district election
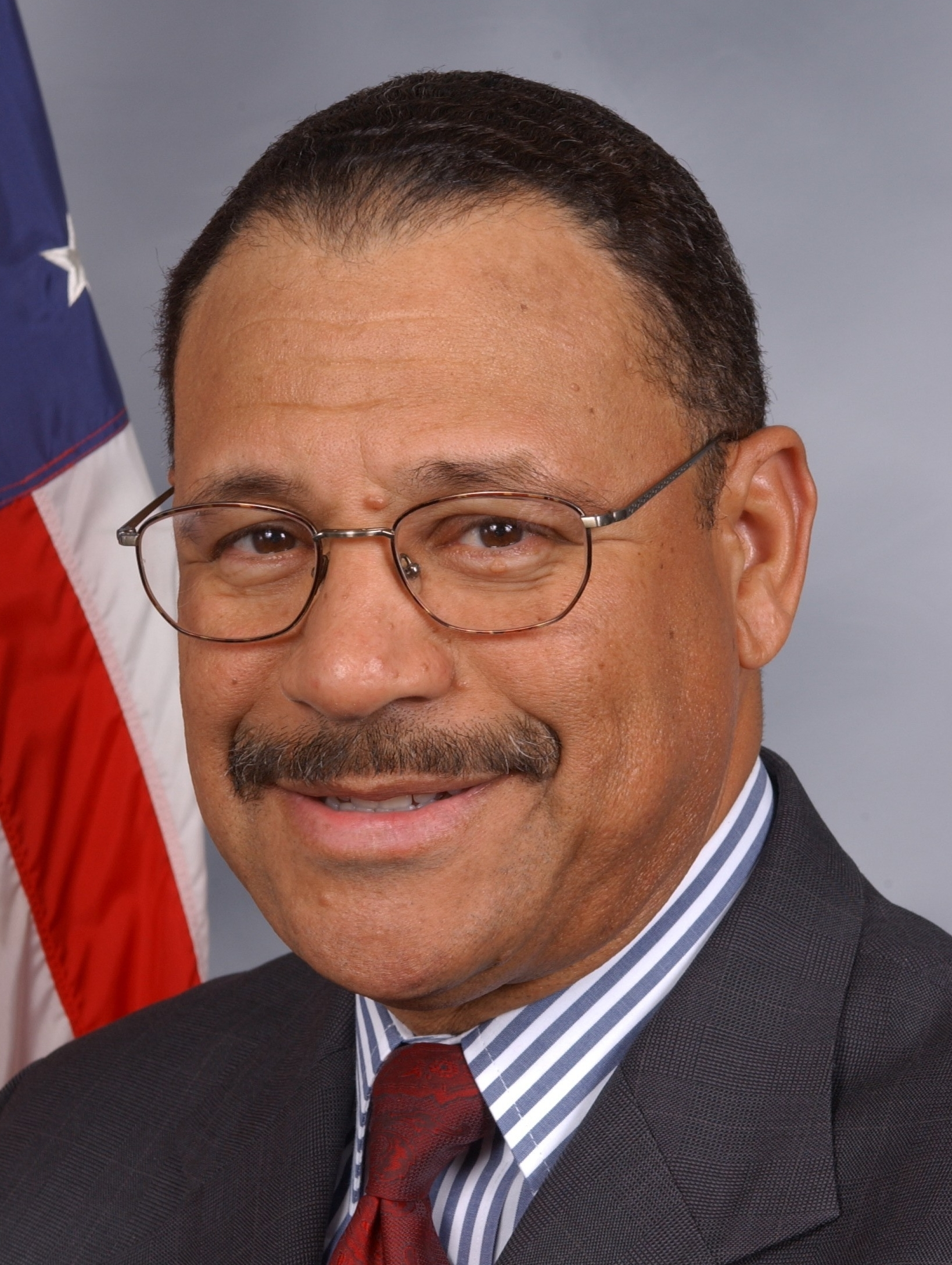

Nominee	Sanford Bishop	John House
Party	Democratic	Republican
Popular vote	162,751	92,410
Percentage	63.8%	36.2%
- Bishop: 50–60% 60–70% 70–80% 80–90% >90% House: 50–60% 60–70% 70–80% 80–90% No votes
U.S. Representative before election
Sanford Bishop
Democratic
Elected U.S. Representative
Sanford Bishop
Democratic

Democratic incumbent Sanford Bishop, who had represented Georgia's 2nd congressional district since 1993, ran for re-election. In redistricting, the 2nd district was made majority-African American, and Macon was moved from the 8th district to the 2nd. The Hill ranked Bishop at fourth in its list of house members most helped by redistricting.

=== Democratic primary ===
==== Candidates ====
===== Nominee =====
- Sanford Bishop, incumbent U.S. representative

==== Primary results ====
Democratic primary results
Party	Candidate	Votes	%
Democratic	Sanford Bishop (incumbent)	68,981	100.0
Total votes		68,981	100.0

=== Republican primary ===
==== Candidates ====
===== Nominee =====
- John House, Army veteran

===== Eliminated in primary =====
- Rick Allen, businessman and candidate for this seat in 2010
- Ken DeLoach, pastor and Christian school dean; candidate for Georgia's 8th congressional district in 2010

==== Primary results ====
Republican primary results
Party	Candidate	Votes	%
Republican	Rick Allen	11,312	42.0
Republican	John House	8,614	31.9
Republican	Ken DeLoach	7,043	26.1
Total votes		26,969	100.0

==== Runoff results ====
Republican primary runoff results
Party	Candidate	Votes	%
Republican	John House	2,705	55.0
Republican	Rick Allen	2,217	45.0
Total votes		4,922	100.0

=== General election ===
==== Endorsements ====
Sanford Bishop (D)

Labor unions

- International Brotherhood of Boilermakers
- International Brotherhood of Electrical Workers
- National Association of Letter Carriers
- National Education Association
- United Steelworkers

Organizations

- NRA Political Victory Fund
John House (R)

Organizations

- Georgia Right to Life
- Iraq Veterans for Congress

==== Predictions ====
Source	Ranking	As of
The Cook Political Report	Safe D	November 5, 2012
Rothenberg	Safe D	November 2, 2012
Roll Call	Safe D	November 4, 2012
Sabato's Crystal Ball	Safe D	November 5, 2012
NY Times	Safe D	November 4, 2012
RCP	Safe D	November 4, 2012
The Hill	Safe D	November 4, 2012

==== Results ====
Georgia's 2nd congressional district, 2012
Party	Candidate	Votes	%
Democratic	Sanford Bishop (incumbent)	162,751	63.8
Republican	John House	92,410	36.2
Total votes		255,161	100.0
Democratic hold			

== District 3 ==
2012 Georgia's 3rd congressional district election
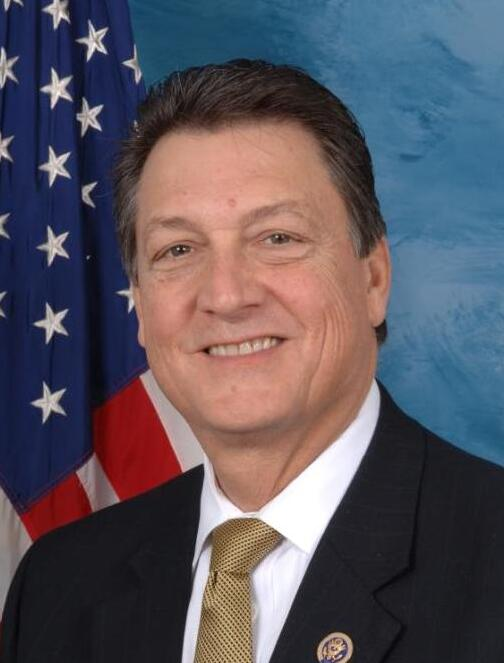
Nominee	Lynn Westmoreland
Party	Republican
Popular vote	232,380
Percentage	99.9%
- County results Westmoreland: >90%
U.S. Representative before election
Lynn Westmoreland
Republican
Elected U.S. Representative
Lynn Westmoreland
Republican

Republican incumbent Lynn Westmoreland, who had represented Georgia's 3rd congressional district since 2007, and had previously represented the 8th district from 2005 to 2007, ran for re-election.

=== Republican primary ===
==== Candidates ====
===== Nominee =====
- Lynn Westmoreland, incumbent U.S. representative

===== Eliminated in primary =====
- Chip Flanegan, business owner
- Kent Kingsley, former chair of the Lamar County Commission and retired Army lieutenant colonel

==== Primary results ====
Republican primary results
Party	Candidate	Votes	%
Republican	Lynn Westmoreland (incumbent)	64,765	71.6
Republican	Chip Flanegan	13,139	14.5
Republican	Kent Kingsley	12,517	13.9
Total votes		90,421	100.0

=== General election ===
==== Endorsements ====
Lynn Westmoreland (R)

Organizations

- Campaign for Working Families
- Georgia Right to Life
- National Right to Life Committee
- NRA Political Victory Fund
- United States Chamber of Commerce

==== Predictions ====
Source	Ranking	As of
The Cook Political Report	Safe R	November 5, 2012
Rothenberg	Safe R	November 2, 2012
Roll Call	Safe R	November 4, 2012
Sabato's Crystal Ball	Safe R	November 5, 2012
NY Times	Safe R	November 4, 2012
RCP	Safe R	November 4, 2012
The Hill	Safe R	November 4, 2012

==== Results ====
Georgia's 3rd congressional district, 2012
Party	Candidate	Votes	%
Republican	Lynn Westmoreland (incumbent)	232,380	99.95
Independent	David Ferguson (write-in)	105	0.05
Total votes		232,485	100.0
Republican hold			

== District 4 ==
2012 Georgia's 4th congressional district election
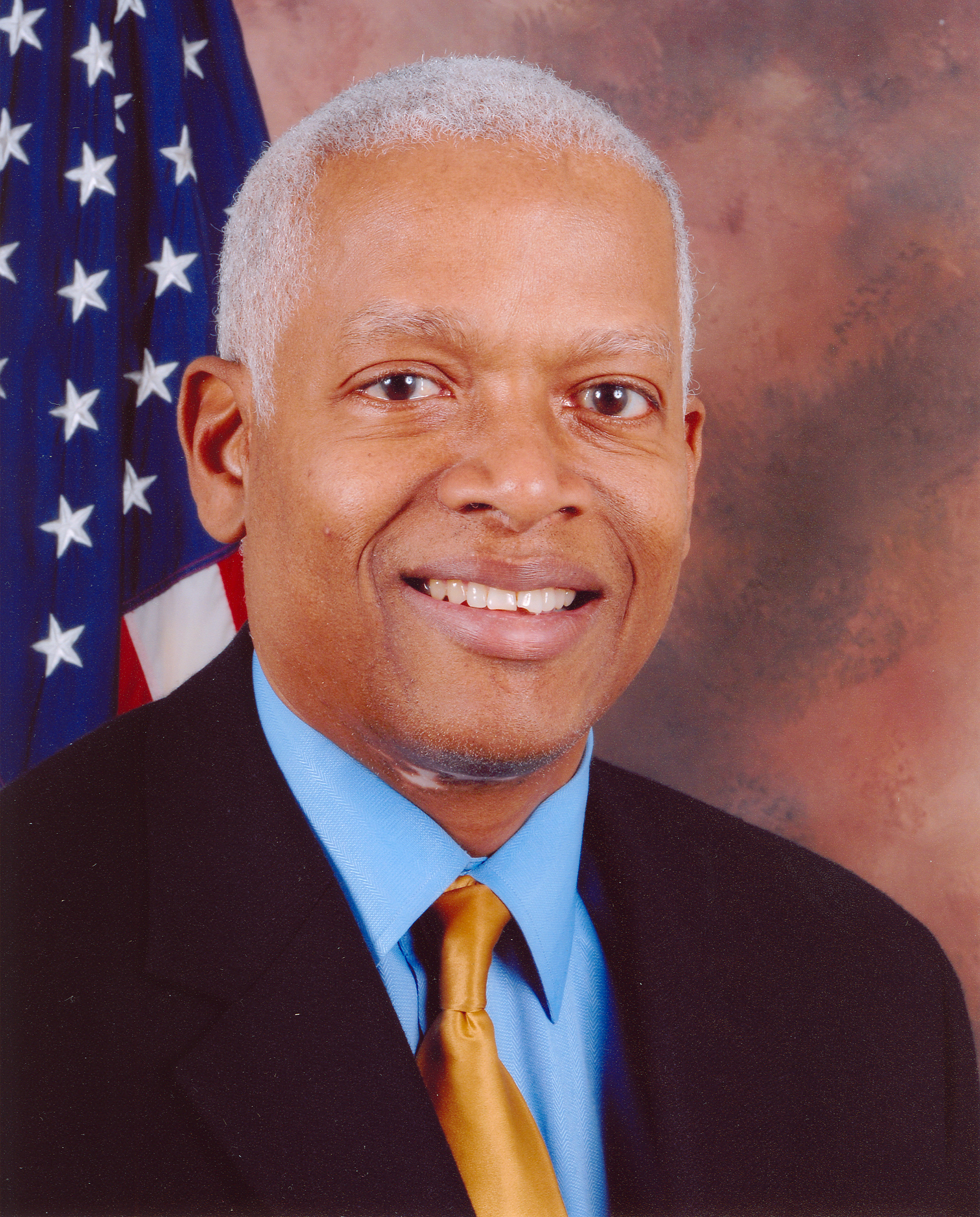

Nominee	Hank Johnson	Chris Vaughn
Party	Democratic	Republican
Popular vote	208,861	75,041
Percentage	73.6%	26.4%
- Johnson: 50–60% 60–70% 70–80% 80–90% >90% Vaughn: 50–60% 60–70% 70–80% No votes
U.S. Representative before election
Hank Johnson
Democratic
Elected U.S. Representative
Hank Johnson
Democratic

Democratic incumbent Hank Johnson, who had represented Georgia's 4th congressional district since 2007, ran for re-election.

=== Democratic primary ===
==== Candidates ====
===== Nominee =====
- Hank Johnson, incumbent U.S. representative

===== Eliminated in primary =====
- Courtney Dillard, candidate for Rockdale County Board of Commissioners in 2010
- Lincoln Nunnally, business consultant

==== Primary results ====
Democratic primary results
Party	Candidate	Votes	%
Democratic	Hank Johnson (incumbent)	52,982	77.0
Democratic	Courtney L. Dillard	13,130	19.1
Democratic	Lincoln Nunnally	2,728	3.9
Total votes		68,840	100.0

=== Republican primary ===
==== Candidates ====
===== Nominee =====
- Chris Vaughn, pastor and motivational speaker

===== Eliminated in primary =====
- Greg Pallen, businessman

==== Primary results ====
Republican primary results
Party	Candidate	Votes	%
Republican	Chris Vaughn	17,261	54.5
Republican	Greg Pallen	14,422	45.5
Total votes		31,683	100.0

=== Green primary ===
==== Candidates ====
===== Nominee =====
- Cynthia McKinney, former U.S. representative and Green Party presidential nominee in 2008

=== General election ===
==== Endorsements ====
Hank Johnson (D)

Labor unions

- International Brotherhood of Boilermakers
- International Brotherhood of Electrical Workers
- National Association of Letter Carriers
- National Education Association
- United Steelworkers

Organizations

- Human Rights Campaign
- Humane Society of the United States
- J Street
- Planned Parenthood Action Fund
- Sierra Club

==== Predictions ====
Source	Ranking	As of
The Cook Political Report	Safe D	November 5, 2012
Rothenberg	Safe D	November 2, 2012
Roll Call	Safe D	November 4, 2012
Sabato's Crystal Ball	Safe D	November 5, 2012
NY Times	Safe D	November 4, 2012
RCP	Safe D	November 4, 2012
The Hill	Safe D	November 4, 2012

==== Results ====
Georgia's 4th congressional district, 2012
Party	Candidate	Votes	%
Democratic	Hank Johnson (incumbent)	208,861	73.6
Republican	Chris Vaughn	75,041	26.4
Georgia Green Party	Cynthia McKinney (write-in)	58	0.0
Independent	Rachele Fruit (write-in)	2	0.0
Total votes		283,962	100.0
Democratic hold			

== District 5 ==
2012 Georgia's 5th congressional district election
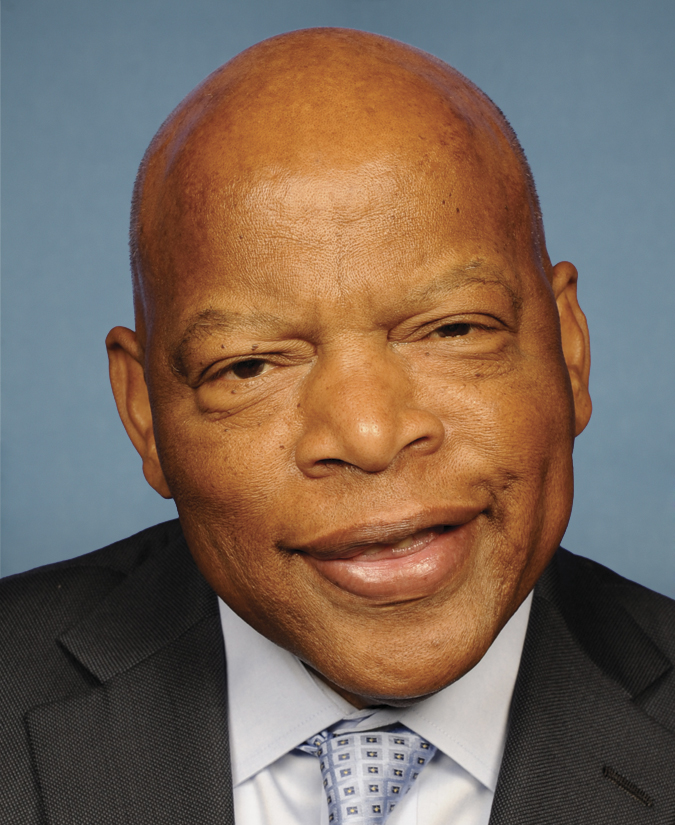

Nominee	John Lewis	Howard Stopeck
Party	Democratic	Republican
Popular vote	234,330	43,335
Percentage	84.4%	15.6%
- County results Lewis: 80–90%
U.S. Representative before election
John Lewis
Democratic
Elected U.S. Representative
John Lewis
Democratic

Democratic incumbent John Lewis, who had represented Georgia's 5th congressional district since 1987, ran for re-election.

=== Democratic primary ===
==== Candidates ====
===== Nominee =====
- John Lewis, incumbent U.S. representative

===== Eliminated in primary =====
- Michael Johnson, former Fulton County superior court judge

==== Primary results ====
Democratic primary results
Party	Candidate	Votes	%
Democratic	John Lewis (incumbent)	69,985	80.8
Democratic	Michael Johnson	16,666	19.2
Total votes		86,651	100.0

=== Republican primary ===
==== Candidates ====
===== Nominee =====
- Howard Stopeck, retired attorney

==== Primary results ====
Republican primary results
Party	Candidate	Votes	%
Republican	Howard Stopeck	11,426	100.0
Total votes		11,426	100.0

=== General election ===
==== Endorsements ====
John Lewis (D)

Labor unions

- International Brotherhood of Boilermakers
- International Brotherhood of Electrical Workers
- National Association of Letter Carriers
- National Education Association
- United Steelworkers

Organizations

- Human Rights Campaign
- Planned Parenthood Action Fund
- Sierra Club
- Stonewall Democrats

==== Predictions ====
Source	Ranking	As of
The Cook Political Report	Safe D	November 5, 2012
Rothenberg	Safe D	November 2, 2012
Roll Call	Safe D	November 4, 2012
Sabato's Crystal Ball	Safe D	November 5, 2012
NY Times	Safe D	November 4, 2012
RCP	Safe D	November 4, 2012
The Hill	Safe D	November 4, 2012

==== Results ====
Georgia's 5th congressional district, 2012
Party	Candidate	Votes	%
Democratic	John Lewis (incumbent)	234,330	84.4
Republican	Howard Stopeck	43,335	15.6
Independent	John Benson (write-in)	12	0.0
Independent	Raymond Davis (write-in)	2	0.0
Total votes		277,680	100.0
Democratic hold			

== District 6 ==
2012 Georgia's 6th congressional district election
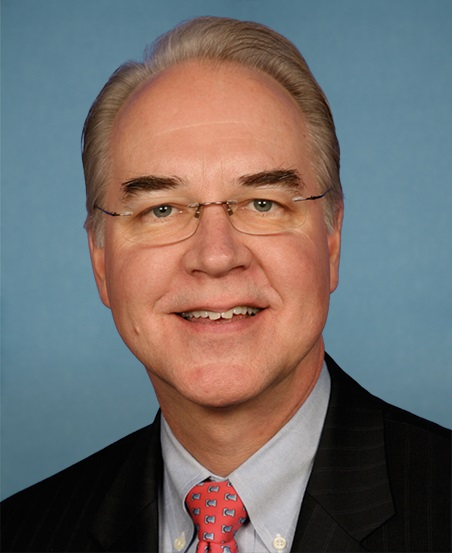

Nominee	Tom Price	Jeff Kazanow
Party	Republican	Democratic
Popular vote	189,669	104,365
Percentage	64.5%	35.5%
- Price: 50–60% 60–70% 70–80% 80–90% >90% Kazanow: 50–60% 60–70% 70–80% No votes
U.S. Representative before election
Tom Price
Republican
Elected U.S. Representative
Tom Price
Democratic

Republican incumbent Tom Price, who had represented Georgia's 6th congressional district since 2005, ran for re-election. In redistricting, the 6th district was made slightly less favorable to Republicans: Cherokee County was removed from the district, while parts of DeKalb County were added to it.

=== Democratic primary ===
==== Candidates ====
===== Nominee =====
- Tom Price, incumbent U.S. representative

=== Republican primary ===
==== Primary results ====
Republican primary results
Party	Candidate	Votes	%
Republican	Tom Price (incumbent)	71,032	100.0
Total votes		71,032	100.0

=== Democratic primary ===
==== Candidates ====
===== Nominee =====
- Jeff Kazanow, business consultant

===== Eliminated in primary =====
- Robert Montigel, businessman

==== Primary results ====
Democratic primary results
Party	Candidate	Votes	%
Democratic	Jeff Kazanow	10,313	51.1
Democratic	Robert Montigel	9,881	48.9
Total votes		20,194	100.0

=== General election ===
==== Endorsements ====
Tom Price (R)

Organizations

- Campaign for Working Families
- Georgia Right to Life
- National Right to Life Committee
- NRA Political Victory Fund
- United States Chamber of Commerce

==== Predictions ====
Source	Ranking	As of
The Cook Political Report	Safe R	November 5, 2012
Rothenberg	Safe R	November 2, 2012
Roll Call	Safe R	November 4, 2012
Sabato's Crystal Ball	Safe R	November 5, 2012
NY Times	Safe R	November 4, 2012
RCP	Safe R	November 4, 2012
The Hill	Safe R	November 4, 2012

==== Results ====
Georgia's 6th congressional district, 2012
Party	Candidate	Votes	%
Republican	Tom Price (incumbent)	189,669	64.5
Democratic	Jeff Kazanow	104,365	35.5
Total votes		294,034	100.0
Republican hold			

== District 7 ==
2012 Georgia's 7th congressional district election
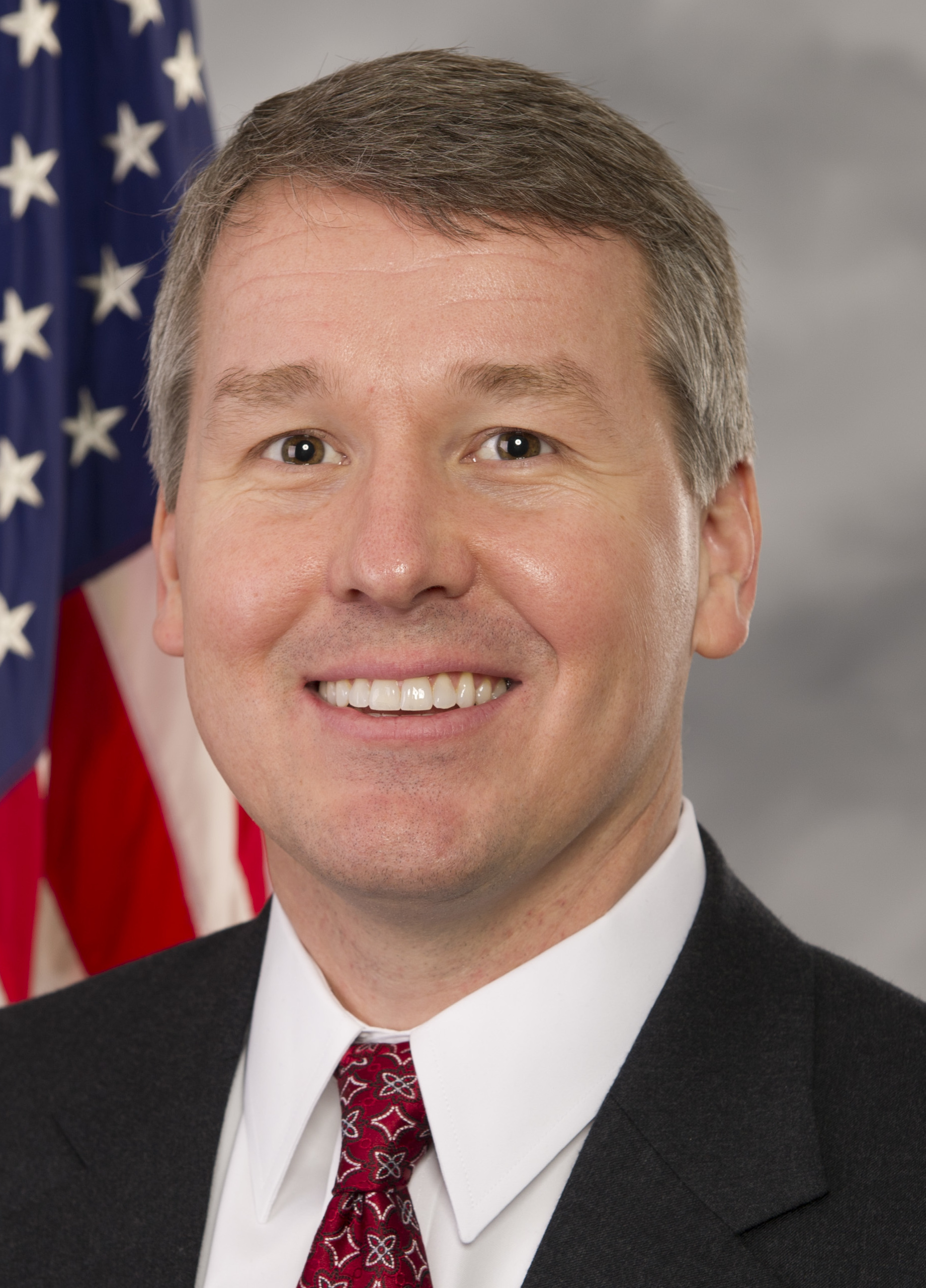

Nominee	Rob Woodall	Steve Reilly
Party	Republican	Democratic
Popular vote	156,689	95,377
Percentage	62.2%	37.8%
- Woodall: 50–60% 60–70% 70–80% 80–90% Reilly: 50–60% 60–70% 70–80% 80–90% No votes Tie
U.S. Representative before election
Rob Woodall
Republican
Elected U.S. Representative
Rob Woodall
Republican

Republican incumbent Rob Woodall, who had represented Georgia's 7th congressional district since January 2011, ran for re-election.

=== Republican primary ===
==== Candidates ====
===== Nominee =====
- Rob Woodall, incumbent U.S. representative

===== Eliminated in primary =====
- David Hancock, software company executive

==== Primary results ====
Republican primary results
Party	Candidate	Votes	%
Republican	Rob Woodall (incumbent)	45,157	71.8
Republican	David Hancock	17,730	28.2
Total votes		62,887	100.0

=== Democratic primary ===
==== Candidates ====
===== Nominee =====
- Steve Reilly, attorney

==== Primary results ====
Democratic primary results
Party	Candidate	Votes	%
Democratic	Steve Reilly	12,394	54.3
Total votes		12,394	100.0

=== General election ===
==== Endorsements ====
Rob Woodall (R)

Organizations

- Georgia Right to Life
- National Right to Life Committee
- United States Chamber of Commerce

==== Predictions ====
Source	Ranking	As of
The Cook Political Report	Safe R	November 5, 2012
Rothenberg	Safe R	November 2, 2012
Roll Call	Safe R	November 4, 2012
Sabato's Crystal Ball	Safe R	November 5, 2012
NY Times	Safe R	November 4, 2012
RCP	Safe R	November 4, 2012
The Hill	Safe R	November 4, 2012

==== Results ====
Georgia's 7th congressional district, 2012
Party	Candidate	Votes	%
Republican	Rob Woodall (incumbent)	156,689	62.2
Democratic	Steve Reilly	95,377	37.8
Total votes		252,066	100.0
Republican hold			

== District 8 ==
2012 Georgia's 8th congressional district election
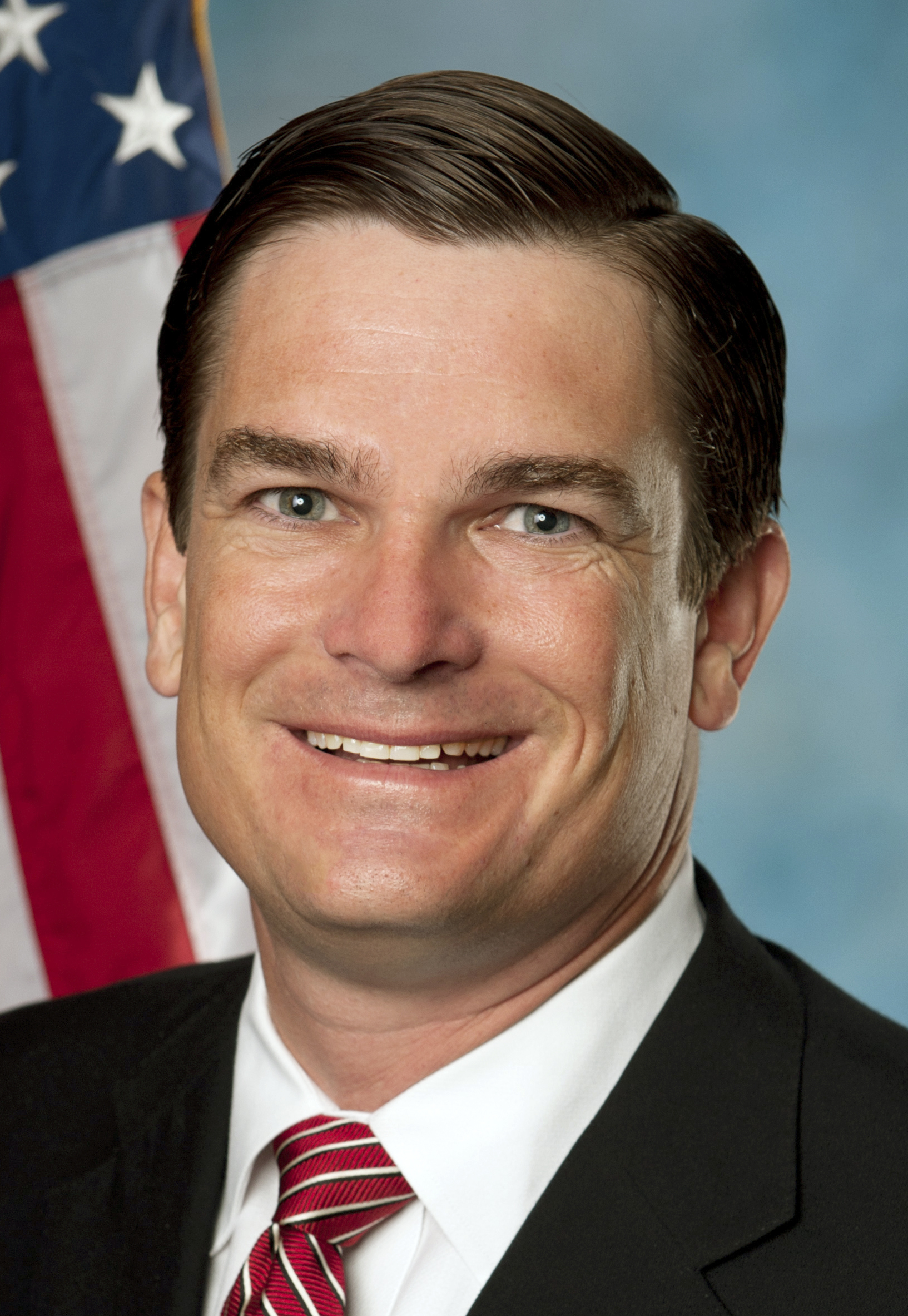
Nominee	Austin Scott
Party	Republican
Popular vote	197,789
Percentage	100%
- County results Scott: 100%
U.S. Representative before election
Austin Scott
Republican
Elected U.S. Representative
Austin Scott
Republican

Republican incumbent Austin Scott, who was first elected to represent Georgia's 8th congressional district in 2010, ran unopposed in the primary as well as the general election. In redistricting, most of Macon—the heart of the 8th and its predecessors for over a century—was shifted to the neighboring 2nd, thereby making the 8th district more favorable to Republicans, which prompted The Hill to rank Scott at fifth in its list of house members most helped by redistricting.

=== Republican primary ===
==== Candidates ====
===== Nominee =====
- Austin Scott, incumbent U.S. representative

==== Primary results ====
Republican primary results
Party	Candidate	Votes	%
Republican	Austin Scott (incumbent)	59,300	100.0
Total votes		59,300	100.0

=== Democratic primary ===
==== Candidates ====
===== Declined =====
- Jim Marshall, former U.S. representative
- DuBose Porter, minority leader of the Georgia House of Representatives

=== General election ===
==== Endorsements ====
Austin Scott (R)

Organizations

- National Right to Life Committee
- NRA Political Victory Fund
- United States Chamber of Commerce

==== Predictions ====
Source	Ranking	As of
The Cook Political Report	Safe R	November 5, 2012
Rothenberg	Safe R	November 2, 2012
Roll Call	Safe R	November 4, 2012
Sabato's Crystal Ball	Safe R	November 5, 2012
NY Times	Safe R	November 4, 2012
RCP	Safe R	November 4, 2012
The Hill	Safe R	November 4, 2012

==== Results ====
Georgia's 8th congressional district, 2012
Party	Candidate	Votes	%
Republican	Austin Scott (incumbent)	197,789	100.0
Total votes		197,789	100.0
Republican hold			

== District 9 ==
2012 Georgia's 9th congressional district election
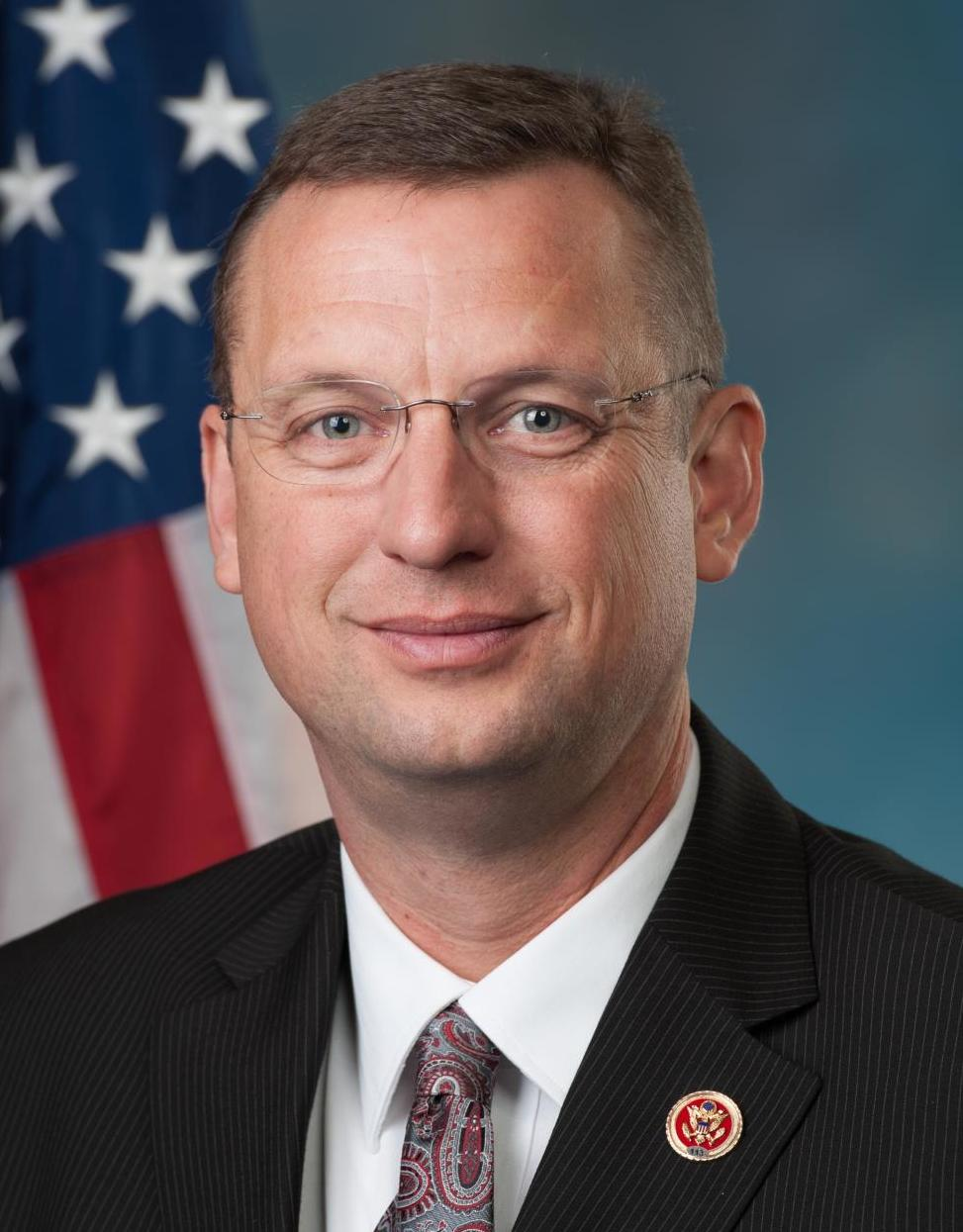

Nominee	Doug Collins	Jody Cooley
Party	Republican	Democratic
Popular vote	192,101	60,052
Percentage	76.2%	23.8%
- County results Collins: 60–70% 70–80% 80–90% Vogel: 70–80%
U.S. Representative before election
None
(New district)
Elected U.S. Representative
Doug Collins
Republican

In redistricting, the new 9th district is centered around Gainesville, and had no incumbent.

=== Democratic primary ===
- Jody Cooley, attorney

==== Primary results ====
Democratic primary results
Party	Candidate	Votes	%
Democratic	Jody Cooley	8,963	54.3
Total votes		8,963	100.0

=== Republican primary ===
==== Candidates ====
===== Nominee =====
- Doug Collins, state representative

===== Eliminated in primary =====
- Roger Fitzpatrick, school principal
- Martha Zoller, radio personality

===== Declined =====
- Hunter Bicknell, chair of the Jackson County Commission
- Jim Butterworth, state senator
- Casey Cagle, lieutenant governor
- Bill Cowsert, state senator
- Clifton McDuffie, former chief executive officer of the Greater Hall Chamber of Commerce

==== Endorsements ====
Martha Zoller

Organizations

- Maggie's List
- Susan B. Anthony List

==== Debate ====
2012 Georgia's 9th congressional district Republican primary debate
No.	Date	Host	Moderator	Link	Republican	Republican	Republican
Key: P Participant A Absent N Not invited I Invited W Withdrawn							
Key: P Participant A Absent N Not invited I Invited W Withdrawn					Doug Collins	Roger Fitzpatrick	Martha Zoller
1		Atlanta Press Club	Jon Shirek	YouTube	P	P	P

==== Primary results ====
Results by county: Collins: 30–40%; 40–50%; 50–60%; Zoller: 40–50%; Fitzpatrick: 40–50%

Republican primary results
Party	Candidate	Votes	%
Republican	Doug Collins	45,894	41.8
Republican	Martha Zoller	45,160	41.1
Republican	Roger Fitzpatrick	18,730	17.1
Total votes		109,784	100.0

==== Runoff debate ====
2012 Georgia's 9th congressional district Republican primary runoff debate
No.	Date	Host	Moderator	Link	Republican	Republican
Key: P Participant A Absent N Not invited I Invited W Withdrawn						
Key: P Participant A Absent N Not invited I Invited W Withdrawn					Doug Collins	Martha Zoller
1		Atlanta Press Club	Condace Pressley	YouTube	P	P

==== Runoff results ====
Results by county: Collins: 50–60%; 60–70%; Zoller: 50–60%

Collins defeated Zoller in an August runoff election.

Republican primary runoff results
Party	Candidate	Votes	%
Republican	Doug Collins	39,016	54.6
Republican	Martha Zoller	32,417	45.4
Total votes		71,433	100.0

=== General election ===
==== Endorsements ====
Doug Collins (R)

Organizations

- Campaign for Working Families
- Georgia Right to Life
- National Right to Life Committee
- NRA Political Victory Fund
- United States Chamber of Commerce

==== Predictions ====
Source	Ranking	As of
The Cook Political Report	Safe R	November 5, 2012
Rothenberg	Safe R	November 2, 2012
Roll Call	Safe R	November 4, 2012
Sabato's Crystal Ball	Safe R	November 5, 2012
NY Times	Safe R	November 4, 2012
RCP	Safe R	November 4, 2012
The Hill	Safe R	November 4, 2012

==== Runoff debate ====
2012 Georgia's 9th congressional district debate
No.	Date	Host	Moderator	Link	Republican	Democratic
Key: P Participant A Absent N Not invited I Invited W Withdrawn						
Key: P Participant A Absent N Not invited I Invited W Withdrawn					Doug Collins	Jody Cooley
1		Atlanta Press Club	John Pruitt	YouTube	P	P

==== Results ====
Georgia's 9th congressional district, 2012
Party	Candidate	Votes	%
Republican	Doug Collins	192,101	76.2
Democratic	Jody Cooley	60,052	23.8
Total votes		252,153	100.0
Republican win (new seat)			

== District 10 ==
2012 Georgia's 10th congressional district election
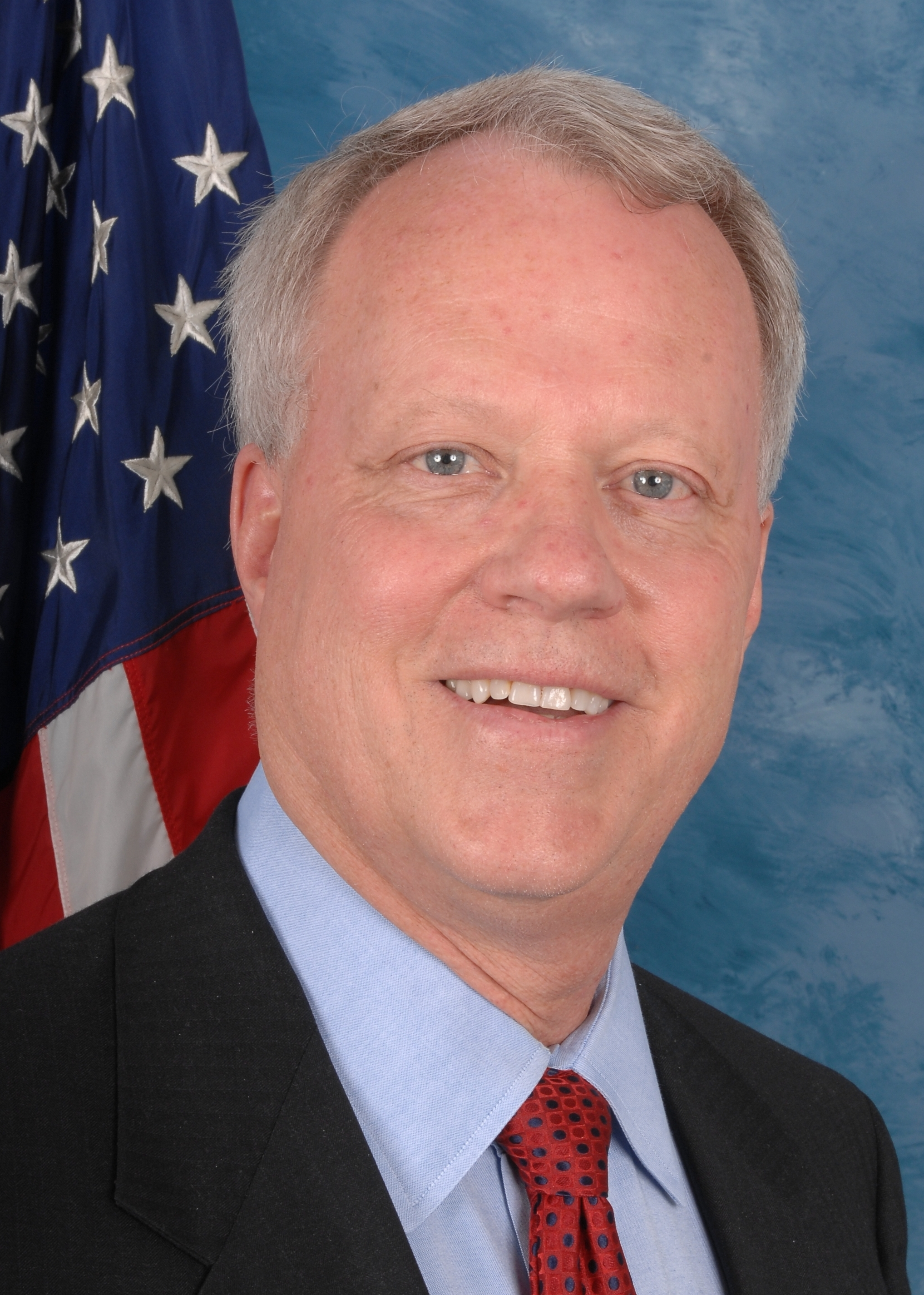
Nominee	Paul Broun
Party	Republican
Popular vote	211,065
Percentage	99.8%
- County results Broun: >90%
U.S. Representative before election
Paul Broun
Republican
Elected U.S. Representative
Paul Broun
Republican

Republican incumbent Paul Broun, who had represented Georgia's 10th congressional district since 2007, ran for re-election.

=== Republican primary ===
==== Candidates ====
===== Nominee =====
- Paul Broun, incumbent U.S. representative

===== Eliminated in primary =====
- Stephen Simpson, businessman and retired Army officer

===== Declined =====
- Mac Collins, former U.S. representative

==== Primary results ====
Republican primary results
Party	Candidate	Votes	%
Republican	Paul Broun (incumbent)	58,405	69.0
Republican	Stephen K. Simpson	26,256	31.0
Total votes		84,661	100.0

=== General election ===
==== Campaign ====
In a leaked video of a speech given at Liberty Baptist Church Sportsman's Banquet on September 27, Broun is heard telling supporters that, "All that stuff I was taught about evolution and embryology and the Big Bang Theory, all that is lies straight from the pit of Hell." Broun also believes that the world is less than 9000 years old and that it was created in six literal days. In response to this, and as Broun is also on the House Science Committee, libertarian radio talk show host Neal Boortz spearheaded a campaign to run deceased biologist Charles Darwin against Broun as the Democratic candidate, with the intention of drawing attention to these comments from the scientific community and having him removed from his post on the House Science Committee. Darwin received nearly 4,000 write-in votes in the election, which Broun won.

==== Endorsements ====
Paul Broun (R)

Organizations

- Eagle Forum
- Georgia Right to Life
- Gun Owners of America
- National Right to Life Committee
- NRA Political Victory Fund
- United States Chamber of Commerce

==== Predictions ====
Source	Ranking	As of
The Cook Political Report	Safe R	November 5, 2012
Rothenberg	Safe R	November 2, 2012
Roll Call	Safe R	November 4, 2012
Sabato's Crystal Ball	Safe R	November 5, 2012
NY Times	Safe R	November 4, 2012
RCP	Safe R	November 4, 2012
The Hill	Safe R	November 4, 2012

==== Results ====
Georgia's 10th congressional district
Party	Candidate	Votes	%
Republican	Paul Broun (incumbent)	211,065	99.8
Independent	Brian Russell Brown (write-in)	401	0.2
Total votes		211,466	100.0
Republican hold			

== District 11 ==
2012 Georgia's 11th congressional district election
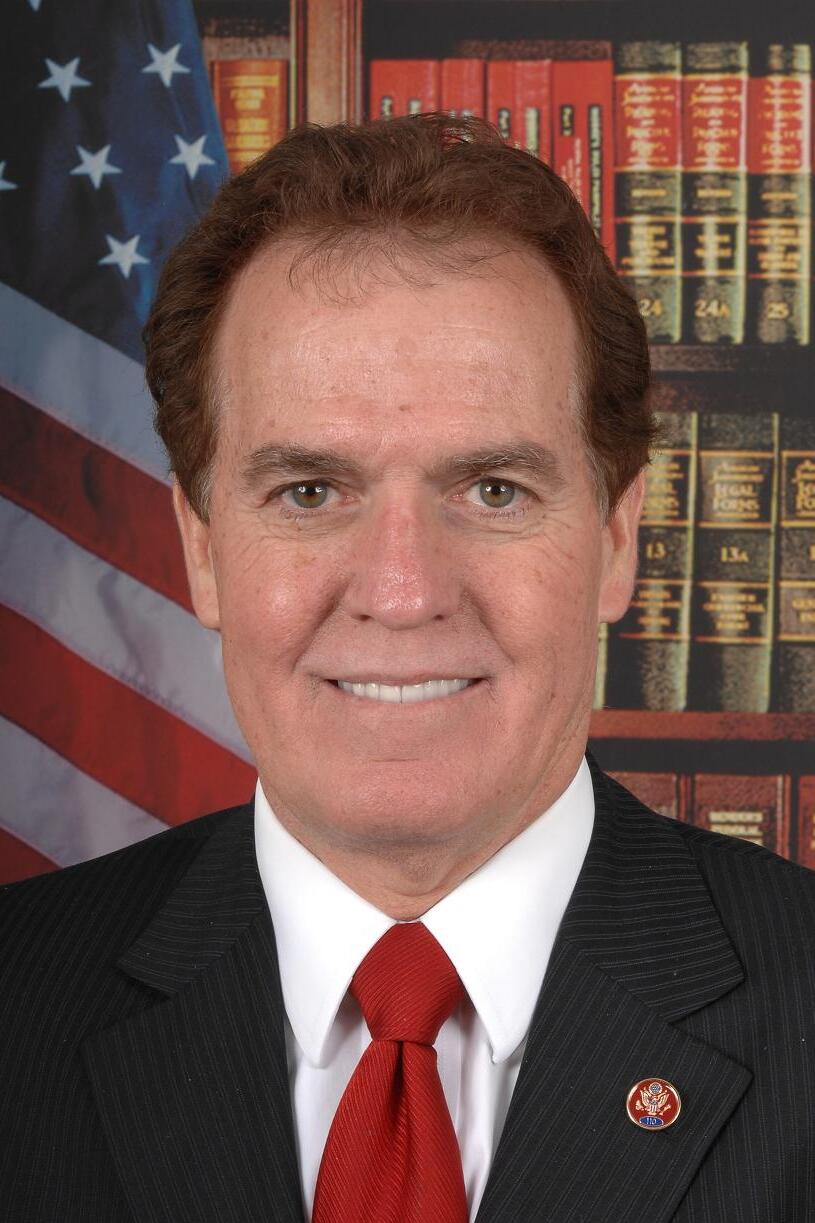

Nominee	Phil Gingrey	Patrick Thompson
Party	Republican	Democratic
Popular vote	196,968	90,353
Percentage	68.5%	31.5%
- Gingrey: 50–60% 60–70% 70–80% 80–90% Thompson: 50–60% 60–70% 70–80% 80–90% No votes
U.S. Representative before election
Phil Gingrey
Republican
Elected U.S. Representative
Phil Gingrey
Republican

Republican incumbent Phil Gingrey, who had represented Georgia's 11th congressional district since 2003, ran for re-election.

=== Republican primary ===
==== Candidates ====
===== Nominee =====
- Phil Gingrey, incumbent U.S. representative

===== Eliminated in primary =====
- William Llop, certified public accountant
- Michael Opitz, arbitrator

==== Primary results ====
Republican primary results
Party	Candidate	Votes	%
Republican	Phil Gingrey (incumbent)	75,697	80.9
Republican	Michael Opitz	9,231	9.9
Republican	William Llop	8,604	9.2
Total votes		93,532	100.0

=== Democratic primary ===
==== Candidates ====
===== Nominee =====
- Patrick Thompson, technology sales executive and nominee for state senate's 56th district in 2010

==== Primary results ====
Democratic primary results
Party	Candidate	Votes	%
Democratic	Patrick Thompson	14,162	100.0
Total votes		14,162	100.0

=== General election ===
==== Endorsements ====
Phil Gingrey (R)

Organizations

- Campaign for Working Families
- Georgia Right to Life
- National Right to Life Committee
- NRA Political Victory Fund
- United States Chamber of Commerce

==== Predictions ====
Source	Ranking	As of
The Cook Political Report	Safe R	November 5, 2012
Rothenberg	Safe R	November 2, 2012
Roll Call	Safe R	November 4, 2012
Sabato's Crystal Ball	Safe R	November 5, 2012
NY Times	Safe R	November 4, 2012
RCP	Safe R	November 4, 2012
The Hill	Safe R	November 4, 2012

==== Results ====
Georgia's 11th congressional district, 2012
Party	Candidate	Votes	%
Republican	Phil Gingrey (incumbent)	196,968	68.5
Democratic	Patrick Thompson	90,353	31.5
Independent	Allan Levene (write-in)	30	0.0
Total votes		287,351	100.0
Republican hold			

== District 12 ==
2012 Georgia's 12th congressional district election
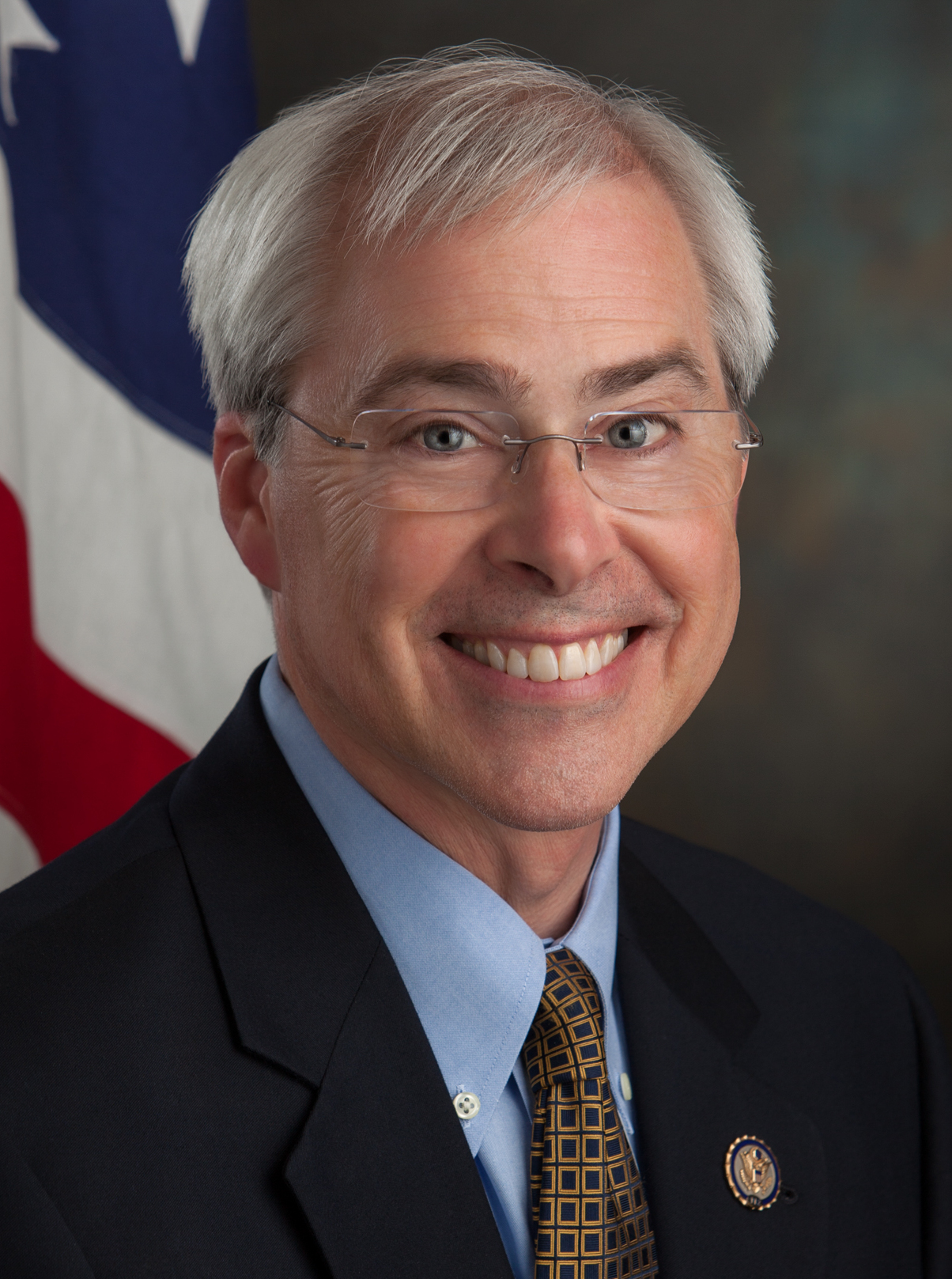

Nominee	John Barrow	Lee Anderson
Party	Democratic	Republican
Popular vote	139,148	119,973
Percentage	53.7%	46.3%
- Barrow: 50–60% 60–70% 70–80% 80–90% >90% Anderson: 40–50% 50–60% 60–70% 70–80% 80–90%
U.S. Representative before election
John Barrow
Democratic
Elected U.S. Representative
John Barrow
Democratic

In redistricting, Savannah was removed from Georgia's 12th congressional district and replaced with the Augusta area, thereby making the district more favorable to Republicans. The former 12th district gave 55 per cent of its vote in the 2008 presidential election to Democratic nominee, whereas only 40 per cent of the new district's voters voted for Obama. Democratic incumbent John Barrow, who had represented the 12th district since 2005, ran for re-election.

=== Democratic primary ===
==== Candidates ====
===== Nominee =====
- John Barrow, incumbent U.S. representative

==== Primary results ====
Democratic primary results
Party	Candidate	Votes	%
Democratic	John Barrow (incumbent)	41,587	100.0
Total votes		41,587	100.0

=== Republican primary ===
==== Candidates ====
===== Nominee =====
- Lee Anderson, state representative

===== Eliminated in primary =====
- Rick W Allen, businessman
- Wright McLeod, real estate lawyer and retired Navy commander
- Maria Sheffield, attorney and candidate for state insurance commissioner in 2010

===== Declined =====
- Max Burns, former U.S. representative
- Buddy Carter, state senator
- Ben Harbin, state representative
- Jeanne Seaver, Tea Party activist and candidate for this seat in 2010;
- Tommie Williams, state senate's president pro tempore

==== Endorsements ====
Maria Sheffield

Organizations

- Maggie's List
- Susan B. Anthony List

==== Primary results ====
Republican primary results
Party	Candidate	Votes	%
Republican	Lee Anderson	20,551	34.2
Republican	Rick Allen	15,436	25.7
Republican	Wright McLeod	14,856	24.8
Republican	Maria Sheffield	9,207	15.3
Total votes		60,050	100.0

Anderson defeated Allen in an August runoff election, winning the Republican nomination.

==== Runoff results ====
Republican primary runoff results
Party	Candidate	Votes	%
Republican	Lee Anderson	13,785	50.3
Republican	Rick Allen	13,626	49.7
Total votes		27,411	100.0

=== General election ===
==== Campaign ====
Given the increased Republican lean of his district and that his home in Savannah had been removed, Barrow faced significant political headwinds entering the general election campaign. However, his ad campaign, where he made direct-to-camera appeals was able to paint him a conservative democrat without alienating the party's liberal base. One ad featured Barrow showing off his grandfather's revolver and his father's bolt-action rifle and recounting, "Long before I was born, my grandfather used this little Smith & Wesson here to help stop a lynching".

In contrast, the Anderson campaign tried to appeal to the district's largely rural base by empathizing his background as a hay farmer. His cause wasn't helped by fact that Anderson, after stumbling in some of the GOP primary debates, has refused to share a debate stage with Barrow, a Harvard-educated lawyer.

Anderson's performance during the campaign was criticised by political analyst Stuart Rothenberg stating that "This district is one that should have never been a headache for the GOP, but after getting a weak nominee in state Rep. Lee Anderson, reality is setting in for many Republican operatives. Anderson's weakness isn't the only factor in this race. Rep. John Barrow has run a good race with terrific TV ads meant to demonstrate his political independence and get voters to focus on him and not on his party."

As election day approached, Barrow expressed confidence, saying, "I'm encouraged by everything I see and hear".

==== Endorsements ====
John Barrow (D)

Labor unions

- AFL–CIO
- International Brotherhood of Electrical Workers
- National Association of Letter Carriers
- National Education Association

Organizations

- Blue Dog Coalition
- Democratic Congressional Campaign Committee "Frontline" Program
- National Federation of Independent Business
- NRA Political Victory Fund
- United States Chamber of Commerce
- Veterans of Foreign Wars
Lee Anderson (R)

U.S. representatives

- John Boehner, speaker of the United States House of Representatives (2011–present)
- Paul Broun, U.S. representative from Georgia's 10th congressional district (2007–present)
- Eric Cantor, majority leader of the United States House of Representatives (2011–present)
- Phil Gingrey, U.S. representative from Georgia's 11th congressional district (2003–present)
- Tom Graves, U.S. representative from Georgia's 9th congressional district (2010–present)
- Jack Kingston, U.S. representative from Georgia's 1st congressional district (1993–present)
- Tom Price, U.S. representative from Georgia's 6th congressional district (2005–present)
- Austin Scott, U.S. representative from Georgia's 8th congressional district (2011–present)
- Lynn Westmoreland, U.S. representative from Georgia's 3rd congressional district (2007–present)
- Rob Woodall, U.S. representative from Georgia's 7th congressional district (2011–present)

Statewide officials

- Gary Black, agriculture commissioner of Georgia (2011-present)
- Nathan Deal, governor of Georgia (2011-present)

Organizations

- Georgia Right to Life
- Gun Owners of America
- National Republican Congressional Committee "Young Guns" Program
- National Right to Life Committee
- Tea Party Express

==== Polling ====
Poll source	Date(s) administered	Sample size	Margin of error	John Barrow (D)	Lee Anderson (R)	Undecided
20/20 Insight, LLC	October 29–31, 2012	450	±4.6%	50%	44%	6%
Benenson Strategy Group	October 8–10, 2012	400	±4.9%	48%	45%	7%
McLaughlin and Associates	August 29–30, 2012	400	±4.9%	43%	44%	13%

==== Predictions ====
Source	Ranking	As of
The Cook Political Report	Tossup	November 5, 2012
Rothenberg	Tossup	November 2, 2012
Roll Call	Tilt D	November 4, 2012
Sabato's Crystal Ball	Lean D	November 5, 2012
NY Times	Tossup	November 4, 2012
RCP	Tossup	November 4, 2012
The Hill	Tossup	November 4, 2012

==== Results ====
Georgia's 12th congressional district, 2012
Party	Candidate	Votes	%
Democratic	John Barrow (incumbent)	139,148	53.7
Republican	Lee Anderson	119,973	46.3
Total votes		259,121	100.0
Democratic hold			

== District 13 ==
2012 Georgia's 13th congressional district election
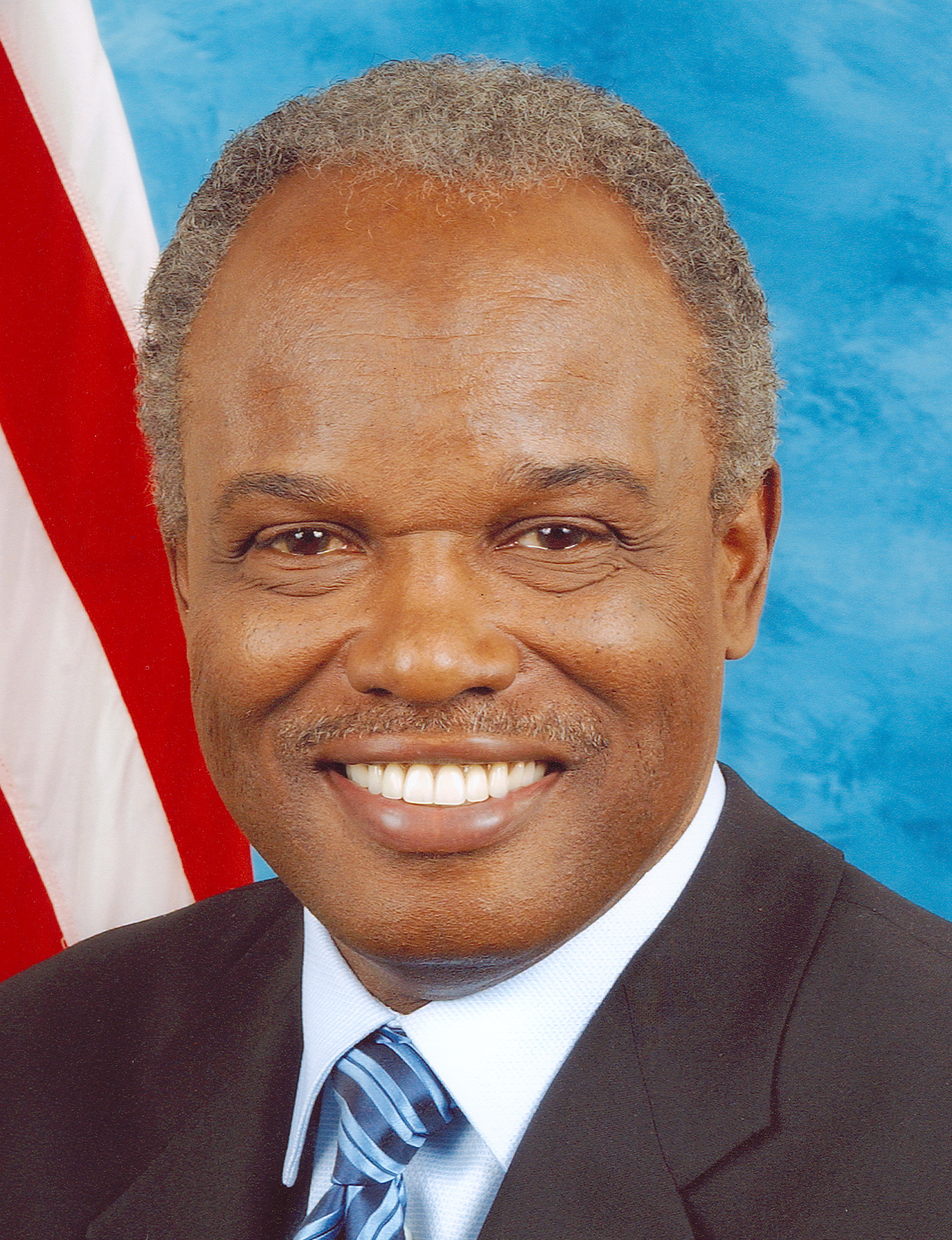

Nominee	David Scott	Shahid Malik
Party	Democratic	Republican
Popular vote	201,988	79,550
Percentage	71.7%	28.3%
- Scott: 50–60% 60–70% 70–80% 80–90% >90% Malik: 50–60% 60–70% 70–80% 80–90% No votes
U.S. Representative before election
David Scott
Democratic
Elected U.S. Representative
David Scott
Democratic

Democratic incumbent David Scott, who had represented Georgia's 13th congressional district since 2003, ran for re-election.

=== Democratic primary ===
==== Candidates ====
===== Nominee =====
- David Scott, incumbent U.S. representative

==== Primary results ====
Democratic primary results
Party	Candidate	Votes	%
Democratic	David Scott (incumbent)	55,214	100.0
Total votes		55,214	100.0

=== Republican primary ===
==== Candidates ====
===== Nominee =====
- Shahid Malik, businessman

==== Primary results ====
Republican primary results
Party	Candidate	Votes	%
Republican	Shahid Malik	28,693	100.0
Total votes		28,693	100.0

=== General election ===
==== Endorsements ====
David Scott (D)

Labor unions

- International Brotherhood of Boilermakers
- International Brotherhood of Electrical Workers
- National Association of Letter Carriers
- National Education Association

Organizations

- Humane Society of the United States
- Planned Parenthood Action Fund
- Sierra Club

==== Predictions ====
Source	Ranking	As of
The Cook Political Report	Safe D	November 5, 2012
Rothenberg	Safe D	November 2, 2012
Roll Call	Safe D	November 4, 2012
Sabato's Crystal Ball	Safe D	November 5, 2012
NY Times	Safe D	November 4, 2012
RCP	Safe D	November 4, 2012
The Hill	Safe D	November 4, 2012

==== Results ====
Georgia's 13th congressional district, 2012
Party	Candidate	Votes	%
Democratic	David Scott (incumbent)	201,988	71.7
Republican	Shahid Malik	79,550	28.3
Total votes		281,538	100.0
Democratic hold			

== District 14 ==
2012 Georgia's 14th congressional district election
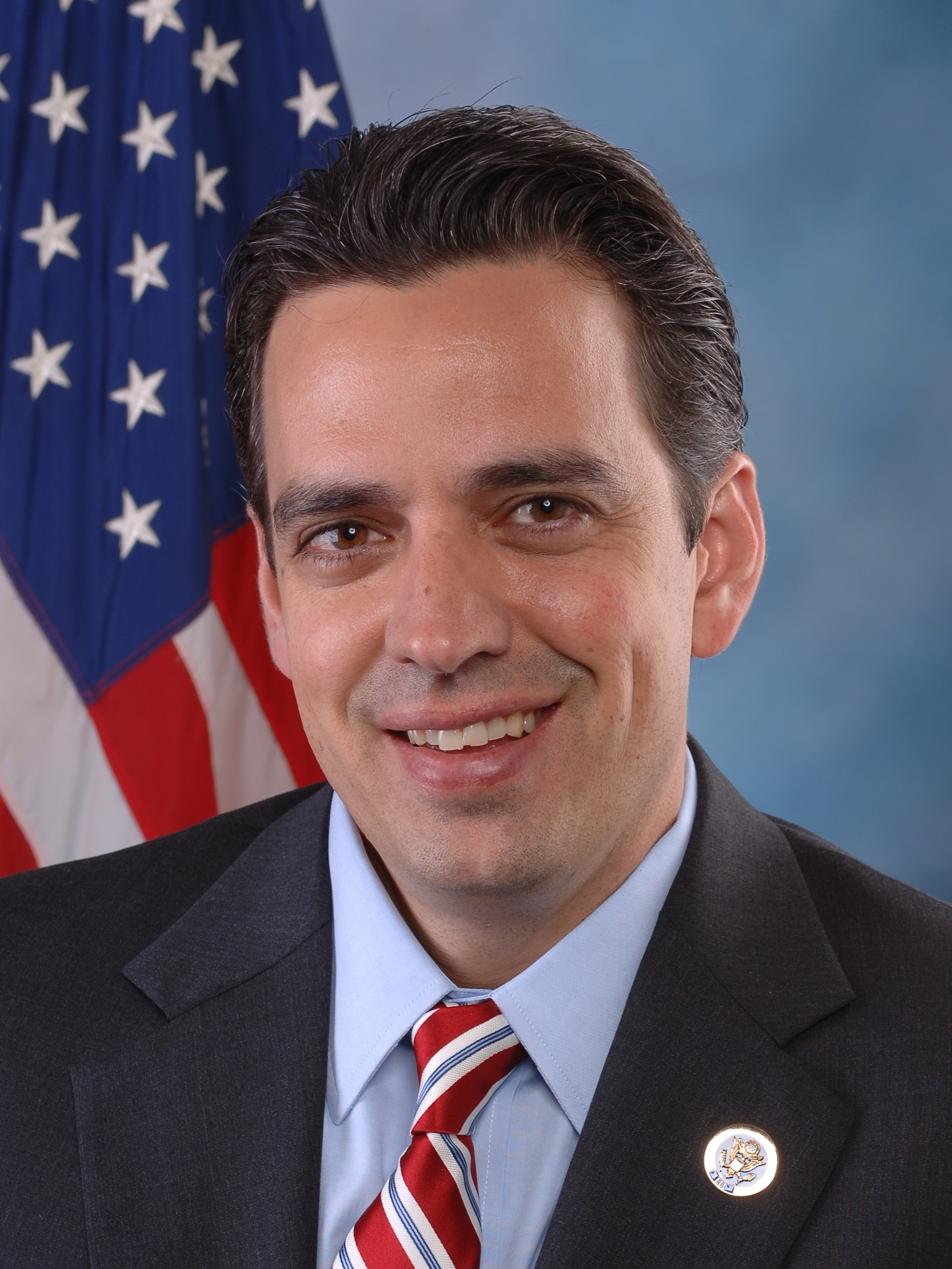

Nominee	Tom Graves	Daniel Grant
Party	Republican	Democratic
Popular vote	159,947	59,245
Percentage	73.0%	27.0%
- Graves: 50–60% 60–70% 70–80% 80–90% Grant: 50–60% 60–70% 70–80%
U.S. Representative before election
Tom Graves (9th)
Republican
Elected U.S. Representative
Tom Graves
Republican

In redistricting, the new 14th district includes almost all of northwestern Georgia. Republican incumbent Tom Graves, who had represented the 9th district since May 2010, lived in this new district and ran for re-election here.

=== Republican primary ===
==== Candidates ====
===== Nominee =====
- Tom Graves, incumbent U.S. representative for Georgia's 9th congressional district

===== Declined =====
- Bob Barr, former U.S. representative and Libertarian Party nominee in 2008
- Jerry Shearin, former chair of the Paulding County Commission
- Steve Tarvin, candidate for the 9th district in 2010

==== Primary results ====
Republican primary results
Party	Candidate	Votes	%
Republican	Tom Graves (incumbent)	65,873	100.0
Total votes		65,873	100.0

=== Democratic primary ===
==== Candidates ====
===== Nominee =====
- Danny Grant, electrician

==== Primary results ====
Democratic primary results
Party	Candidate	Votes	%
Democratic	Danny Grant	10,228	100.0
Total votes		10,228	100.0

=== General election ===
==== Endorsements ====
Tom Graves (R)

Organizations

- Campaign for Working Families
- Eagle Forum
- Family Research Council
- Georgia Right to Life
- National Right to Life Committee
- NRA Political Victory Fund
- United States Chamber of Commerce

==== Predictions ====
Source	Ranking	As of
The Cook Political Report	Safe R (flip)	November 5, 2012
Rothenberg	Safe R (flip)	November 2, 2012
Roll Call	Safe R (flip)	November 4, 2012
Sabato's Crystal Ball	Safe R (flip)	November 5, 2012
NY Times	Safe R (flip)	November 4, 2012
RCP	Safe R (flip)	November 4, 2012
The Hill	Safe R (flip)	November 4, 2012

==== Results ====
Georgia's 14th congressional district, 2012
Party	Candidate	Votes	%
Republican	Tom Graves (incumbent)	159,947	73.0
Democratic	Daniel "Danny" Grant	59,245	27.0
Total votes		219,192	100.0
Republican hold			
