= Cecily Hill =

Cecily Hill may refer to:

- Cecily Hill, representative in the Georgia General Assembly, 2002
- Lydia Cecilia Hill (1913–1940), British dancer, used stage name Cecily Hill
