= Georgia Right to Life =

- Founder: Jay and Cheryl Bowman
- Type: IRS exemption status: 501(c)(4)
- Purpose: Education; Legislation; Political action
- Location(s): 783 Holcomb Bridge Rd; Norcross, Georgia 30071
- Region served: Georgia
- Method: Donations
- Key people: Ricardo Davis, President; Zemula Fleck, Executive Director
- Website: grtl.org

Georgia Right to Life (GRTL) is an American 501(c)(4) anti abortion organization that is non-profit, non-partisan, and non-sectarian. It was incorporated in 1971 by Jay and Cheryl Bowman. In 1973, it became the state affiliate of the Washington, D.C.–based National Right to Life Committee in response to the Supreme Court decision of Roe v. Wade which legalized abortion.

GRTL serves as Georgia's largest anti abortion rights organization with grassroots chapters across more than 30 counties in Georgia and more than 240,000 identified anti-abortion households. Its activities include education, legislation, and political action to oppose legalized abortion, infanticide, euthanasia, embryonic stem cell research, human cloning and artificially produced genetic transformation.

== Early history ==
Mary Boyert

From 1978 until the early 1980s, the organization was run from the home of Mary Boyert, a member of the committee who worked as their Education Director from 1979 to 1980. She was then elected as president, and held that role until 1986. She was then appointed as executive director. Boyert left in 2000 when she became the Archdiocesan Pro-Life Director in 2000.

== Legislation and political endorsements ==
For the 1990 Georgia gubernatorial election, Georgia Right to Life endorsed Democratic primary candidate Roy Barnes, while rejecting pro-choice Republican Johnny Isakson. GRTL later opposed Barnes' run for governor in 1998, after he had switched to a pro-choice stance, claiming he had "abandoned his principles for political gain." For the 1996 United States presidential election, GRTL president Gen Wilson mentioned Alan Keyes as a personal favorite, while also acknowledging that "realistically, you have to be pragmatic."

In 2000, president-elect Caryl Swift disqualified candidates who held an abortion exception in favor of rape and incest victims from receiving an endorsement from GRTL. In the 2002 U.S. Senate election, GRTL initially endorsed Republicans Saxby Chambliss and Bob Irvin, who had claimed to only support abortions in cases where the mother's life is at risk. The organization later repealed its endorsement of Chambliss, when it was revealed that he also supported abortions for pregnancies from rape and incest. In 2004, after Republican U.S. representative Johnny Isakson voted to allow overseas military hospitals to perform abortions, Georgia Right to Life jointly endorsed Republicans Herman Cain and Mac Collins to oppose his run for U.S. Senate. For the 2006 Georgia state elections, GRTL endorsed several Republicans, including Casey Cagle, Ralph E. Reed Jr., Gary Black, Brian Kemp and Sonny Perdue, as well as Democrat Walter Ray.

During Swift's presidency, GRTL also began lobbying for Georgia state representatives and proposed legislation. GRTL successfully lobbied the Georgia General Assembly on HB 197 in 2006, which created a 24-hour waiting period for all women seeking an abortion, tightened parental notification regulations, mandated that all women seeking abortion be offered the chance to view an ultrasound, and mandated all women seeking abortion be informed about fetal pain.

Swift was succeeded as president by Daniel Becker in 2007. (Note: Becker had been serving as vice president of the organization since 2006, and as director of its political action committee since 2000.) Under Becker's leadership, the organization lobbied for restrictions on abortion, including the Human Life Amendment which would have defined personhood as beginning at fertilization, to be added to the Georgia Constitution. The organization lobbied Georgia House Speaker Glenn Richardson for a speedy vote on the amendment. To date, the Human Life Amendment has not come to a vote in the Georgia General Assembly. Other GRTL-sponsored legislation which has not received a hearing in the Georgia House include SB 223 "The Woman's Reproductive Health Oversight Committee," HR 1 "Ban on Abortion," and HR 5 "Paramount Right to Life Amendment."

Georgia Right to Life endorsed Mike Huckabee in the 2008 presidential election, while its national affiliate National Right to Life endorsed Fred Thompson. For the U.S. House elections it endorsed Paul Broun for GA-10, as well as 67 Republicans and one Democrat for the Georgia State House, and 28 Republicans and two Democrats for the State Senate. The organization has also supported the Ethical Treatment of Human Embryos Act, the Option of Adoption Act, and HR 334/SR 156 "Opposing FOCA Resolution." GRTL opposes embryonic stem cell research, as well as in vitro fertilization.

In 2009, Georgia Right to Life released its Candidate Affirmation statement. Any political candidate who seeks an endorsement from the organization must sign the statement. The document reads: (Note: The statement has since undergone slight modifications.)

WHEREAS, the 14th Amendment of the U.S. Constitution states, "nor shall any state deprive any person of life, liberty or property, without due process of law, nor deny to any person within its jurisdiction the equal protection of the law," Georgia Right to Life PAC affirms the principle that the right to life is the bedrock upon which all other Constitutional rights are derived.

IN ADDITION, we believe, in the face of compelling biological evidence that a continuum of human life and personhood begins at the moment of fertilization and ends at natural death, the ethical treatment of human embryos must include their "best interests,"

THEREFORE, as a candidate for public office, I affirm my support for a Human Life Amendment to the Georgia Constitution and other actions that would support these principals [sic]. This would assure that regardless of race, age, degree of disability, manner of conception or circumstances surrounding a terminal illness, that the civil rights of the pre-born at an embryonic or fetal level, the elderly and those with mental or physical infirmities are protected by law and are violated when we allow destructive embryonic stem cell research, therapeutic or reproductive cloning, animal-human hybrids, abortion (except to save the life of the mother), infanticide, euthanasia or assisted suicide.

—

Five of the Republican candidates in the 2010 Georgia gubernatorial election – Georgia state senator Eric Johnson; Ray McBerry; Georgia state Commissioner John Oxendine; Georgia state representative Austin Scott; and Jeff Chapman – had signed GRTL's declaration. Republican candidate Karen Handel, who opposed abortions with exceptions for rape and incest, was described by GRTL as being "extremely liberal" on the issue.

For the 2012 United States presidential election, Georgia Right to Life endorsed Newt Gingrich and Rick Santorum. The organization was publicly reprimanded by its national affiliate, the National Right to Life Committee, which endorsed Republican Mitt Romney, who previously held a pro-choice stance but later adopted a pro-life stance. In 2014, the NRLC voted to replace GRTL with the Georgia Life Alliance as its official affiliate for the state of Georgia, after GRTL opposed the Pain-Capable Unborn Child Protection Act and the No Taxpayer Funding for Abortion Act. Georgia Right to Life repeatedly opposed legislation that sought to ban abortions with exceptions for rape and incest, with anti-abortion critics denouncing GRTL's aggressive "all-or-nothing" approach. Opponents of GRTL's approach included Erick Erickson of RedState and Georgia House speaker David Ralston, while supporters of its approach included PSC member Tim Echols. In 2015, Georgia Right to Life eliminated the "life of the mother" exception for candidates seeking endorsement.

For the 2016 presidential election, the organization initially endorsed Republican Ted Cruz for president, in August 2015. Following the emergence of Donald Trump as the presumptive nominee of the Republican Party, GRTL instead endorsed Constitution Party nominee Darrell Castle, in June 2016. GRTL described Trump as having "flip-flopped on pro-life issues", including considering appointing his pro-abortion sister Maryanne Trump Barry to the Supreme Court, and speaking positively of Planned Parenthood. Upon president Trump's decision to nominate Brett Kavanaugh to the Supreme Court, GRTL criticized Kavanaugh's stance on abortion, and called on Trump to replace him with Amy Coney Barrett. In 2019, GRTL opposed the anti-abortion Georgia House Bill 481 over its exceptions for pregnancies from rape and incest.

== Activities ==
=== Recurring ===
The organization hosts the annual Georgia March For Life Memorial Service and the Silent March. The Georgia March For Life commemorates the anniversary of Roe v. Wade and takes place at Liberty Plaza, across from the Georgia State Capitol. State representative Martin Scott (R-District 2) and Dr. Alveda King, the niece of Rev. Dr. Martin Luther King Jr., spoke at the Silent March in 2009. In 2001, GRTL established the REACH Benefit Dinner. REACH, which is an acronym for Reaching Hearts, Changing Minds, is an annual fundraiser for GRTL's Educational Trust Fund.

Georgia Right to Life publishes a bi-monthly newsletter with a stated circulation of around 60,000.

=== Campaigns ===
In 2010, GRTL promoted an outreach campaign aimed towards the state's African-American women, whose pregnancies were aborted at a disproportionately high rate. The campaign made use of 80 billboards around Atlanta, which described black children as an "endangered species" due to their abortion rates. GRTL claimed that abortions were a tool used by racists and segregationists, in order to "stealthily target blacks for extermination," and asserted that Planned Parenthood founder Margaret Sanger wanted to reduce the black population. Loretta Ross of SisterSong criticized the campaign, describing it as an attempt to both demonize and victimize African Americans seeking abortions. GRTL's campaign also included screenings of the Life Dynamics documentary film Maafa 21, which alleged that white elites had used abortions to control black population growth since the end of slavery.

== Organization ==
In 2014, the National Right to Life Committee voted to replace GRTL with the Georgia Life Alliance as its official affiliate for the state of Georgia, after GRTL opposed the Pain-Capable Unborn Child Protection Act and the No Taxpayer Funding for Abortion Act.

=== Presidents ===
The organization is run by a president, elected by the members to serve a two-year term. Presidents may only serve three consecutive terms.

List of presidents:

- 1970–1979: Jay Bowman
- 1979–1980: Kel MacDonald
- 1980–1986: Mary Boyert
- 1986–1988: John and Linda Fuchko
- 1988–1989: Erik Petersen
- 1990–1991: Tom Clark
- 1991–2000: Genevieve Wilson
- 2000–2007: Caryl Swift
- 2007–2015: Dan Becker
- Since 2015: Ricardo Davis (Note: At the time of his election, Davis was serving as chairman of the Constitution Party of Georgia.)
