= Jamie Oglesby =

American politician (1929–2013)

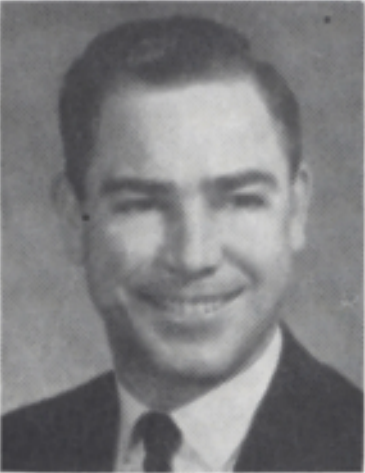

Member of the Georgia House of Representatives
- In office 1964–1968
- Constituency: 92-2

Personal details
- Born: January 2, 1929 Elberton, Georgia, U.S.
- Died: January 2, 2013 (aged 84)
- Party: Republican
- Spouse: Delpha Elizabeth Folmer (m. 1951; died 2009)
- Children: 1

Military service
- Allegiance: United States
- Branch/service: United States Army
- Rank: Second Lieutenant
- Battles/wars: Korean War

Jamie White Oglesby, Sr. (January 2, 1929 – January 2, 2013) was an American politician from the state of Georgia. He was born in Elberton. He served two terms in the Georgia House of Representatives from 1964 to 1968, becoming the first elected Republican Minority Leader of the Georgia House in decades and the first elected minority leader of the Republican caucus. An alumnus of the University of North Georgia, he bought and operated the Liberal Kansas Memorial Granite Service until he served in the U.S. Army as a Second Lieutenant during the Korean War. When he returned from the war, he returned to operating another memorial stone business and worked with his wife as realtors. He served as a delegate to the 1964 and 1968 Republican National Conventions.
