= List of minority leaders of the Georgia House of Representatives =

This is a list of minority leaders of the Georgia House of Representatives

Name	Took office	Left office	Party/Caucus
Jamie Oglesby	1964	1966	Republican
Leroy Simkins	1966	1966	Republican
Jamie Oglesby	1966	1968	Republican
Carr Dodson	1968	1970	Republican
Michael J. Egan	1971	1977	Republican
Herbert Jones, Jr.	1979	1983	Republican
Johnny Isakson	1983	1991	Republican
Paul Heard	1991	1992	Republican
Steve Stancil	1992	1994	Republican
Bob Irvin	1994	2001	Republican
Lynn Westmoreland	2001	2003	Republican
Glenn Richardson	2003	2005	Republican
DuBose Porter	2005	2011	Democratic
Stacey Abrams	2011	2017	Democratic
Bob Trammell	2017	2021	Democratic
James Beverly	2021	2025	Democratic
Carolyn Hugley	2025	Incumbent	Democratic

== See also ==
- List of Georgia state legislatures
