= Martha Zoller =

American political commentator (1959–2026)

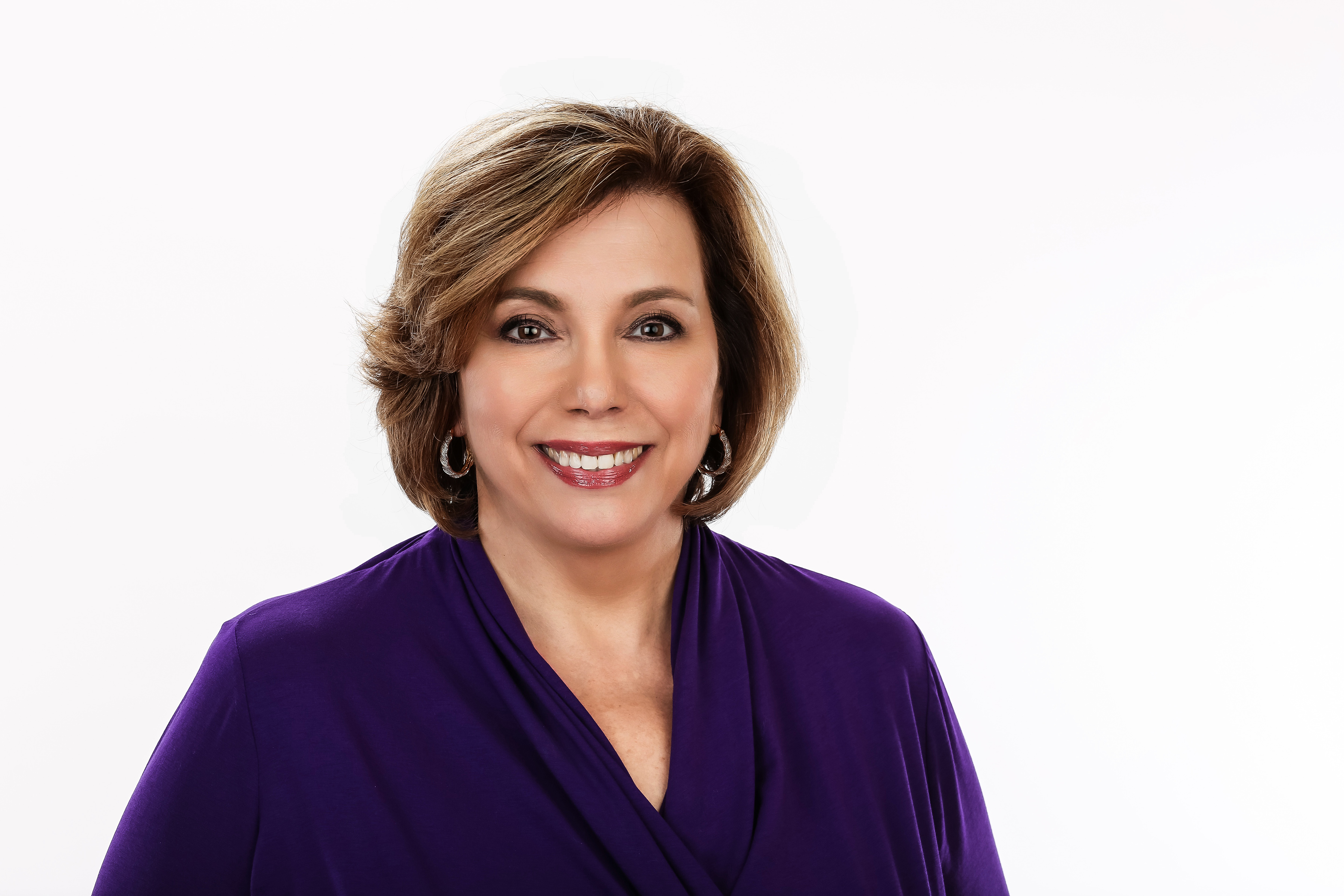
- Born: Martha Mitchell; August 23, 1959; Columbus, Georgia, U.S.
- Died: June 22, 2026 (aged 66); Gainesville, Georgia, U.S.
- Education: University of Georgia (BA)
- Political party: Republican
- Website: Official website

Martha Mitchell Zoller (August 23, 1959 – June 22, 2026) was an American columnist, media personality, author and Republican candidate for the United States House of Representatives in 2012.

== Background ==
Born on August 23, 1959, to Frank and Juanita Mitchell (née Roof), Martha Zoller's father was a veteran of World War II in Europe and a POW escapee. Her mother worked with the Rich's company in downtown Atlanta, Georgia. The youngest of four children, Zoller attended Columbia High School in south DeKalb County before going on to graduate from the University of Georgia Grady School in 1979 with a degree in journalism. After college, Martha started her career as a corporate buyer for Rich's in Atlanta.

Zoller married Linwood Zoller III on June 2, 1990, and had four children and six grandchildren. She died on June 22, 2026, at the age of 66, one week after suffering a stress-related heart attack.

== Broadcasting ==
Zoller began broadcasting in 1994 as co-host of the conservative Mid-Day program on WDUN AM 550 in Gainesville after being a regular caller to the station, and additionally made television appearances on Fox 5 Atlanta's The Georgia Gang and frequent guest appearances on cable channels such as CNN, Fox News, and MSNBC, on programs including TalkBack Live, Hannity & Colmes, and Larry King Live. Zoller also penned opinion pieces which were published in the Atlanta Journal-Constitution. Zoller's program was named as one of Talkers Magazine's "Heavy Hundred" talk shows in America in 2005, 2006, 2007, and 2009.

In 2008, The Martha Zoller Show, originating from North Georgia's newstalk station FM 103.7 WXKT, was syndicated statewide on the Georgia News Network until she ended her show to run for Congress.

== Other media ==
On April 6, Zoller launched the website ZPolitics.com. In 2024, Zoller joined Substack.

In 2005, Zoller visited Baghdad, Iraq, with the "Voices of Soldiers" Tour and participated in the Joint Civilian Orientation Conference (JCOC), a United States Department of Defense program for "America's leaders interested in expanding their knowledge of the military and national defense". She returned to Iraq in January 2007.

== Congressional campaign ==
In the 2012 House of Representatives election, Zoller sought the Republican nomination for Georgia's 9th congressional district. She was endorsed by Herman Cain, Newt Gingrich, Rick Santorum, and the Tea Party Express, among others. She was beaten in the primaries by Doug Collins, who went on to win the seat.

== Works ==
- Indivisible: Uniting Values for a Divided America (Stroud & Hall Publishers), 2005
