= Lynn Westmoreland =

American politician (born 1950)

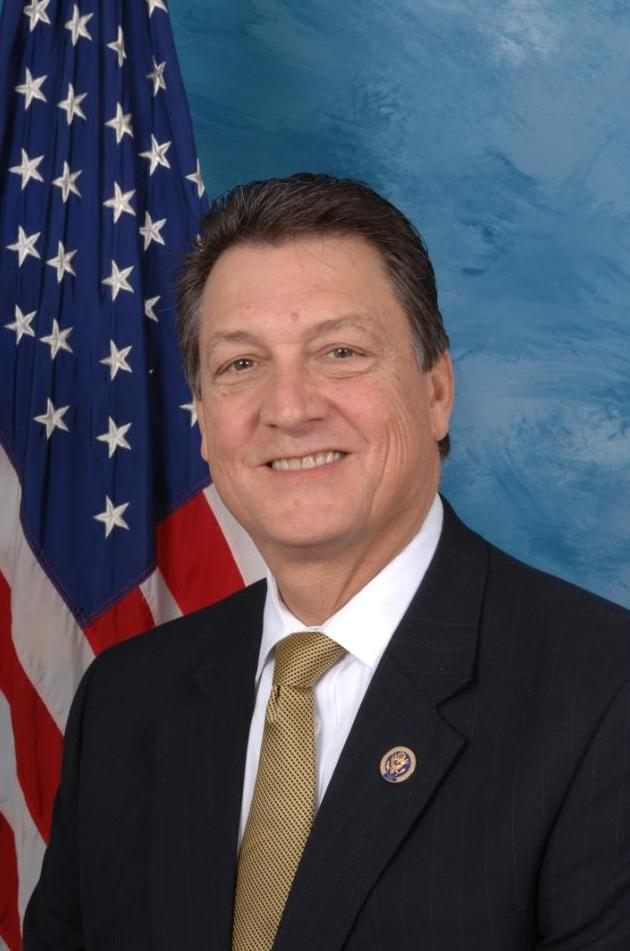

Member of the U.S. House of Representatives from Georgia
- In office January 3, 2005 – January 3, 2017
- Preceded by: Mac Collins
- Succeeded by: Drew Ferguson
- Constituency: 8th district (2005–2007); 3rd district (2007–2017)

Minority Leader of the Georgia House of Representatives
- In office January 2001 – January 2003
- Preceded by: Bob Irvin
- Succeeded by: Glenn Richardson

Member of the Georgia House of Representatives
- In office January 1993 – January 2005
- Preceded by: Ken Birdsong
- Succeeded by: Karla Drenner
- Constituency: 104th district (1993–2003); 86th district (2003–2005)

Personal details
- Born: Leon Acton Westmoreland; April 2, 1950 (age 76) Atlanta, Georgia, U.S.
- Party: Republican
- Spouse: Joan Westmoreland
- Education: Georgia State University (attended)

Leon Acton "Lynn" Westmoreland Jr. (born April 2, 1950) is an American politician who was the U.S. representative for Georgia's 3rd congressional district from 2007 to 2017 and the 8th district from 2005 to 2007. He is a member of the Republican Party.

== Early life, education and career ==
Westmoreland was born in Atlanta, the son of Margaret Ferrell (née Lawson) and Leon Acton Westmoreland. He grew up in Metro Atlanta. He has no degree beyond a high school diploma. He attended Georgia State University, but dropped out to work in a family construction business in which he later became an executive. He served in the Georgia House of Representatives from 1993 to 2005, rising to the position of House Republican Leader in 2001. He held that position until 2003 when he stepped down in order to devote time to his Congressional campaign in late 2003. He continued to serve in the Georgia House until his election to the US House in 2005.

As Republican Leader in the Georgia House, he led the fight against intense partisan gerrymandering during the redistricting process controlled by the Democratic majority in 2001. He abandoned his opposition and was instrumental in the mid-decade redistricting that took place in 2005, after Republicans won control of the Georgia legislature in the 2004 elections.

== U.S. House of Representatives ==
=== Tenure ===
During his first term in the 109th United States Congress, Westmoreland was appointed to the U.S. House Committee on Small Business, U.S. House Committee on Government Reform, and the U.S. House Committee on Transportation and Infrastructure.. In January 2015, the House Intelligence Committee was reorganized, and a subcommittee on Cybersecurity and the National Security Agency was created with Westmoreland appointed to be the subcommittee's first chairman.

As a U.S. congressman, Westmoreland cosponsored a bill to place the Ten Commandments in the House of Representatives and the Senate. Westmoreland also sponsored a bill that the Ten Commandments could be displayed in courthouses in a historical setting. In May 2006, political humorist Stephen Colbert interviewed Westmoreland for The Colbert Report show segment Better Know a District, and during the interview, asked Westmoreland to name the Ten Commandments. Westmoreland was able to name only three of them. Govtrack.us ranked Westmoreland as tied for the most conservative member of the 112th Congress.

Westmoreland led a group of congressmen who opposed the 2006 renewal of certain provisions in the Voting Rights Act that require nine Southern states and a number of counties (mostly in the South) to obtain Federal permission for certain changes to election law or changes in venue. Westmoreland and his colleagues claimed that it was no longer fair to target their states, given the passage of time since 1965 and the changes their states had made to provide fair elections and voting. Despite Westmoreland's objections, a strong bipartisan majority renewed the Voting Rights Act for another 25 years without changes.

In 2008, Westmoreland ran unopposed in the Republican primary and was re-elected after defeating his Democratic opponent Stephen Camp. After his win, Westmoreland announced that he was considering running for the office of Governor of Georgia in 2010, but later indicated in an April 2009 press release that he would not.

In 2010 Westmoreland signed a pledge sponsored by Americans for Prosperity promising to vote against any Global Warming legislation that would raise taxes.

As of February 4, 2016, Westmoreland had the most conservative ideology score of any member of the House of Representatives in the 114th Congress according to GovTrack. As of April 25, 2016, he was the second-most conservative member of the House.

=== Legislation ===
Westmoreland has sponsored various bills of his own, including:

==== 110th Congress (2007–2008) ====
- H.R. 3229, a bill to mint 350,000 $1 infantry coins for sale during 2012, with a surcharge of $10 on the sale of such coins, and with revenue to be allocated to the National Infantry Museum, introduced July 30, 2007, signed into law October 8, 2008.
- H.R. 3492, a bill to increase the allowable amount of campaign contributions to political action committees (PACs), introduced September 6, 2007.

==== 112th Congress (2011–2012) ====
- H.R. 5710, a bill to establish a total daily energy consumption standard for medium temperature commercial refrigerators, introduced May 10, 2012.

==== 113th Congress (2013–2014) ====
- H.R. 3985, a bill to prohibit health insurers from making required payments under the Patient Protection and Affordable Care Act (PPACA) for transitional reinsurance in the individual health insurance market, and to repeal the PPACA's risk corridors and risk adjustments for insurance companies, introduced February 3, 2014.
- H.R. 4604, a bill to allow for consumers to opt out of having personally identifiable information collected by the Consumer Financial Protection Bureau (CFPB) and to set a 60-day time limit on how long the CFPB can store such information, introduced May 7, 2014.

=== Committee assignments ===
- Committee on Financial Services
  - Subcommittee on Financial Institutions and Consumer Credit
  - Subcommittee on Insurance, Housing and Community Opportunity
- Permanent Select Committee on Intelligence
- House Select Committee on the Events Surrounding the 2012 Terrorist Attack in Benghazi
- Republican Study Committee
- Tea Party Caucus

== Controversy ==
On September 4, 2008, Westmoreland described Democratic presidential nominee Barack Obama and his wife Michelle as "uppity", a term historically used by Southern white Americans to describe Black Americans who "didn't know their place." Westmoreland said to reporters, "Just from what little I've seen of her and Mr. Obama, Senator Obama, they're a member of an elitist-class individual that thinks that they're uppity." When asked to confirm his use of the word, Westmoreland answered, "Uppity, yeah."

The ensuing media attention compelled Westmoreland to issue the following statement: "I've never heard that term used in a racially derogatory sense. It is important to note that the dictionary definition of 'uppity' is 'affecting an air of inflated self-esteem—snobbish.' That's what we meant by uppity when we used it in the mill village where I grew up."

During the national debate in 2015 over the future of the Confederate flag some Republicans proposed a moderate amendment to allow Confederate symbols at national cemeteries. Representative Lynn Westmoreland distinguished between racism and a memorial,

When you're putting a flag on someone's grave, to me it's a little different from being racist. It's more of a memorial ... You can't make an excuse for things that happened, but the majority of people that actually died in the Civil War on the Confederate side did not own slaves. These were people that were fighting for their states. I don't think they had even any thoughts about slavery.

— Representative Lynn Westmoreland July 2015

When Westmoreland was asked if he understood Representative John Lewis' perspective, he responded, "I guess the question is, 'Does he understand where I'm coming from?'"

== Political campaigns ==
Westmoreland won a plurality of votes in the Republican primary election in 2004, but faced fellow Republican Dylan Glenn in a runoff. Westmoreland received 55.5% of the vote in the runoff. The district was so heavily Republican that Westmoreland's primary victory was tantamount to election in November. He routed his Democratic opponent, businesswoman Silvia Delamar, with almost 76% of the vote. The district was renumbered as the 3rd in 2006 and made even more Republican than its predecessor. Westmoreland was reelected five more times from this district with no substantive opposition.

== Later career ==
Westmoreland is an appointed member of the Office of Congressional Ethics, a nonpartisan, independent committee charged with overseeing outside ethics complaints against members of Congress.

== Personal life ==
He resides in Grantville, Georgia, with his wife, Joan; they have three children and nine grandchildren. His daughter, Marcy Sakrison, ran unsuccessfully in the 2019 special election for a seat in the Georgia House of Representatives.

Georgia House of Representatives
Preceded by Kenneth W. "Ken" Birdsong	Member of the Georgia House of Representatives from the 104th district 1993–2003	Succeeded by Kenneth W. "Ken" Birdsong
Preceded by Warren Massey	Member of the Georgia House of Representatives from the 86th district 2003–2005	Succeeded by Karla Drenner
Preceded by Bob Irvin	Minority Leader of the Georgia House of Representatives; 2001–2003	Succeeded by Glenn Richardson
U.S. House of Representatives
Preceded by Mac Collins	Member of the U.S. House of Representatives from Georgia's 8th congressional district 2005–2007	Succeeded by Jim Marshall
Preceded by Jim Marshall	Member of the U.S. House of Representatives from Georgia's 3rd congressional district 2007–2017	Succeeded by Drew Ferguson
U.S. order of precedence (ceremonial)
Preceded by Phil Gingrey as Former U.S. Representative	Order of precedence of the United States as Former U.S. Representative	Succeeded by Joseph P. Kennedy II as Former U.S. Representative
