= Bob Irvin =

American politician

Bob Irvin (born September 9, 1948) was an early leader of the modern Republican Party in Georgia in the United States. He was a member of the Long Range Planning Committee in the 1970s, along with Mack Mattingly, Paul Coverdell, Newt Gingrich, and John Linder. He served 15 years in the Georgia House of Representatives, in the 1970s and again in the 1990s. He ran for the State House in 1990, but lost the Republican primary to Dorothy Felton by 227 votes. He was elected to his second stint in the State House after incumbent Mitch Skandalakis was elected to the Fulton County Board of Commissioners in November 1993. He was the House Republican Leader 1994–2000, known for passing welfare reform and tax cuts. He ran unsuccessfully for the United States Senate in 2002, losing to Saxby Chambliss. He attracted attention in early 2005 by publicly calling for Ralph Reed to withdraw from the race for Lieutenant Governor of Georgia.

== Biography ==
Irvin grew up in Roswell, Georgia. He was valedictorian at Lovett School in 1966, and Phi Beta Kappa at College of William & Mary, where he was editor of the newspaper. He graduated from Emory Law School on a full scholarship and earned an MBA at Harvard Business School. He was a partner at McKinsey & Co. and at Bridge Strategy Group.

He has been interviewed on video 3 times by the University of Georgia and once by West Georgia on the growth of the Republican party in Georgia (videos available on the internet). Irvin was a founding member of the Roswell Historical Society, and has served on numerous nonprofit boards, including the Atlanta Historical Society, Georgia Common Cause, and the Atlanta Chamber Players.

Georgia House of Representatives
Preceded by James Wilson Morgan	Member of the Georgia House of Representatives from the 23rd district 1973–1979	Succeeded by Luther S. Colbert
Preceded by Mitch Skandalakis	Member of the Georgia House of Representatives from the 45th district 1993–2003	Succeeded by Roger Bruce
Preceded by Joe Burton	Minority Caucus Chairman of the Georgia House of Representatives; 1976–1978	Succeeded by Joe Burton
Preceded by Steve Stancil	Minority Leader of the Georgia House of Representatives; 1994–2000	Succeeded by Lynn Westmoreland
