= Pain-Capable Unborn Child Protection Act =

Congressional bill

- Nicknames: Micah's Law
- Announced in: the 115th United States Congress
- Number of co-sponsors: 182

Codification
- Titles affected: Title 18 of the United States Code

Legislative history
- Introduced in the House as H.R. 36 by Trent Franks (R-AZ) on January 3, 2017; Committee consideration by House Judiciary Committee; Passed the House on October 3, 2017 (237–189)

The Pain-Capable Unborn Child Protection Act (also colloquially known as Micah's Law) is a congressional bill that would, in most cases, make it unlawful to perform an abortion if the estimated post-fertilization age of a fetus is 20 weeks or more. The bill is based upon the assertion that a fetus is capable of feeling pain during an abortion at and after that point in a pregnancy.

The Pain-Capable Unborn Child Protection Act has been repeatedly introduced in Congress since 2013. It passed the House of Representatives in 2013, 2015, and 2017. The bill has twice received a majority of votes in the Senate, but has failed to reach the 60 votes required to break a filibuster. In 2021, Senator Lindsey Graham introduced it again where it was referred to the Committee on the Judiciary. In 2021 it was co-sponspored by 45 senators, all Republicans.

== Name and provisions ==
The Pain-Capable Unborn Child Protection Act has become known as Micah's Law because of Micah Pickering, a boy from Iowa who was born prematurely at 22 weeks' gestation in 2012 and survived; Pickering appeared in a 2016 Susan B. Anthony List election advertisement criticizing Hillary Clinton's support for legal abortion after 20 weeks' gestation. Pickering and his family have appeared at press conferences supporting the bill.

In the legislative findings section, the bill states that pain receptors (nociceptors) "are present throughout the unborn child's entire body", that "nerves link these receptors to the brain's thalamus and subcortical plate by no later than 20 weeks after fertilization", and that anesthesia is routinely administered to fetuses undergoing fetal surgery (thus supporting the conclusion that fetuses feel pain).

The bill prohibits abortions after 20 weeks post-fertilization unless the abortion is judged necessary to save the life of the mother; is the result of a rape of an adult woman who has received counseling or medical treatment for the rape; or is the result of an act of rape or incest against a minor that has been reported to a law enforcement agency or other government authority.

The bill imposes a criminal penalty against any person performing an abortion after 20 weeks. That penalty consists of a fine, imprisonment for up to five years, or both. It bars any prosecution of a woman receiving an abortion after 20 weeks, and allows any woman on whom an abortion is performed after 20 weeks in violation of the law to seek civil action against the person who performed the abortion.

== Legislative history ==
The bill was first introduced by Rep. Trent Franks of Arizona in the 113th Congress on April 26, 2013. The bill passed the House on June 18, 2013 by a vote of 228–196. It was introduced in the Senate in November 2013 by Sen. Lindsey Graham of South Carolina.

Franks re-introduced the bill in the 114th Congress on January 6, 2015. The House passed the bill by a vote of 242–184 on May 13, 2015. Graham re-introduced the bill in the Senate in June 2015. On September 22, 2015, the bill was filibustered in the Senate. Fifty-four senators voted for cloture (in other words, to send the bill to the Senate floor) and 42 voted against cloture; accordingly, the bill failed to reach the 60-vote threshold needed to break the filibuster.

Franks re-introduced the bill in the 115th Congress on January 3, 2017. On October 2, 2017, the White House issued a statement of policy announcing that Donald Trump's advisors would recommend he sign the bill if it reached his desk. The House passed the bill on October 3, 2017, by a vote of 237–189. Graham introduced the bill in the Senate on October 5, 2017. The bill was considered by the Senate on January 29, 2018. The bill failed to receive the 60 votes needed for cloture; the vote was 51–46. Forty-eight Republicans and three Democrats voted for the bill, while 44 Democrats and two Republicans voted against it.

== Public opinion ==
Numerous polls have shown that a ban on abortions after 20 weeks is supported by a majority or a plurality of Americans. In 2013, The Washington Post reported that women supported banning abortions after 20 weeks in higher numbers than men. The following table contains data from public opinion polls that asked Americans about their thoughts on banning abortions after 20 weeks.

Poll source	Date	Question wording	Support/Favor (somewhat/strongly combined)	Oppose (somewhat/strongly combined)	Undecided/No Opinion
McLaughlin & Associates/Susan B. Anthony List	January 2017	"The U.S. House of Representatives recently passed legislation that would prohibit abortions after 20 weeks, or five months of pregnancy, with exceptions for rape and incest. Do you support or oppose the legislation outlawing most abortions after 20 weeks, or five months of pregnancy?"	62%	25%	12%
Knights of Columbus/Marist	January 2017	"Please tell me if you strongly support, support, oppose, or strongly oppose banning abortions after 20 weeks of pregnancy except to save the life of the mother?"	59%	35%	5%
Quinnipiac	November 2014	"As you may know, in 2013 the House of Representatives approved legislation that would ban virtually all abortions nationwide after 20 weeks of pregnancy, except in cases of rape and incest that are reported to authorities. Would you support or oppose such legislation?"	60%	33%	7%
Washington Post/ABC News	July 2013	"As you may know, in 2013 the House of Representatives approved legislation that would ban virtually all abortions nationwide after 20 weeks of pregnancy, except in cases of rape and incest that are reported to authorities. Would you support or oppose such legislation?"	60%	33%	7%
NBC News/Wall Street Journal	July 2013	Unavailable	44%	37%	–
Rasmussen Reports	July 2013	Unavailable	44%	41%	15%
National Journal	June 2013	"As you may know, the House of Representatives recently approved legislation that would ban virtually all abortions nationwide after 20 weeks of pregnancy, except in cases of rape and incest that are reported to authorities. (Supporters say the legislation is necessary because they believe a fetus can feel pain at that point of the pregnancy.) (Opponents say it undermines the right to abortion that the U.S. Supreme Court established in 1973.) Would you support or oppose such legislation?"	48%	44%	–
Huffington Post/YouGov	June 2013	"Would you favor or oppose a federal law that would ban most abortions after 20 weeks of pregnancy, except in cases of rape or incest?"	59%	30%	12%

An additional poll not included in the table above was conducted by The Washington Post and ABC News in July 2013 asked votes to choose between allowing legal abortion without restriction in the first 24 weeks of pregnancy and allowing it without restriction in the first 20 weeks of pregnancy. Given that choice, 56% of adults preferred the 20-week threshold, while 27% supported a 24-week threshold.

Planned Parenthood commissioned an August 2013 poll that asked respondents whether abortion should be legal or illegal in the following scenarios: carrying the pregnancy to term would cause serious long-term health problems to the mother; the fetus is not viable and personal/health circumstances are such that she shouldn't continue pregnancy; the pregnancy was the result of rape or incest; and the fetus has severe abnormalities that would cause fetal death or extreme disability. In each scenario, between 58% and 66% respondents said abortion after 20 weeks should be legal.

== Politicians, political parties, and interest groups ==
After the House passed the bill in 2015, Hillary Clinton's senior policy adviser Maya Harris criticized the bill as "a direct challenge to Roe v. Wade, which has protected a woman's constitutional right to privacy for over forty years."

The 2016 Republican Party national platform specifically endorsed the federal version of the act. Most of the candidates running for the Republican nomination for president in 2016 pledged support for a 20-week abortion ban. In September 2016, Donald Trump—then the Republican nominee for President—wrote a letter to anti-abortion leaders committing to sign the Pain-Capable Unborn Child Protection Act if elected. Following the Supreme Court decision Dobbs v. Jackson, which overturned Roe v. Wade, in 2022 observers noted that Trump's views may be "shifting" and he may be more open to allowing states to regulate abortion laws on their own.

== Similar state laws ==
Pain-capable abortion bans in the U.S. Banned based on fetal pain Ban enacted not based on basis of fetal pain Ban blocked by courts No ban

In October 2017, 21 states had passed laws banning abortion after 20 weeks' gestation. In Arizona and Idaho, such laws have been blocked by courts and are not in effect. As of August 2026, 41 states restrict abortion after a certain point in pregnancy, 24 of these restrict abortion after 20 weeks or earlier.

In 2012, Trent Franks introduced the District of Columbia Pain-Capable Unborn Child Protection Act, which would use Congress's legislative authority over the District of Columbia under Article I of the United States Constitution to prohibit abortions in D.C. after twenty weeks. The bill received majority support in the House by a vote of 220–154, but failed to achieve the two-thirds majority needed for passage.
