= Tommie Williams =

American farmer, businessman and politician from Georgia

Member of the Georgia State Senate from the 19th district
- In office January 1999 – January 2017
- Preceded by: Edward Boshears
- Succeeded by: Blake Tillery

President pro tempore of the Georgia State Senate
- In office January 12, 2009 – January 12, 2013
- Preceded by: Eric Johnson
- Succeeded by: David Shafer

Majority Leader of the Georgia State Senate
- In office 2005 – January 12, 2009
- Preceded by: Bill Stephens
- Succeeded by: Chip Rogers

Personal details
- Party: Georgia Republican Party
- Spouse: Stephanie
- Children: 3
- Education: University of Georgia
- Occupation: Farmer, businessman, politician
- Committees: Agriculture and Consumer Affairs Appropriations

Tommie Williams is an American politician from the state of Georgia. He is a member of the Republican Party and was first elected to the Georgia Senate in 1998. Williams represented the 19th district, which encompassed Appling, Jeff Davis, Long, Montgomery, Toombs, Wayne, Wheeler, and parts of Liberty and Tattnall Counties. He was selected as Senate Majority Leader in 2005, and was voted President Pro Tempore of the Senate in 2009. Williams announced his retirement in March 2016, and did not seek re-election. In 2018, he was appointed by U.S. Agriculture Secretary Sonny Perdue to be Minister-Counselor for Agriculture at the U.S. Mission to the United Nations Agencies for Food and Agriculture in Rome, Italy.

== Biography ==
Tommie Andrew Williams is the son of Jack Warren "Coogan' and Lluuana Thompson Williams. He began his career as an onion farmer in Toombs county, was a public school teacher, and is currently a tree farmer.

Tommie received a bachelor's degree at the University of Georgia, and a master's degree in education at Georgia Southern University.

== Senate career ==
Williams was first elected to the State Senate in 1998, after winning a three-way primary. Beginning in 2006, he had had no primary challengers until his retirement in 2017.

In 2005, Williams was chosen as Senate Majority Leader. He served in that role until 2009, when he was voted President Pro Tempore, the second highest position in the Senate, behind Lieutenant Governor. He was also Chairman of the Administrative Affairs Committee from 2009 to 2013.

In August 2011, Senator Williams was asked by members of the press if he was interested in running against U.S.Congressman John Barrow, in whose district he resides. Williams indicated that it did interest him, however, he would still be running for re-election to his Senate seat.

Senator Williams endorsed Newt Gingrich for president in the 2012 Republican presidential primaries.

On June 4, 2012, Senator Williams sent an open letter to the Senate Republican Caucus and to members of the press in which he stated his intentions to forgo seeking re-election for the position of President Pro Tempore. His reasons included spending more time with his family, as inspired by the movie Courageous, and his belief that leadership positions should be rotated or term-limited.

== Election history ==
=== 1998 ===
Georgia Senate District 6 Primary Election, 1998
Party	Candidate	Votes	%	±%
Republican	Tommie Williams	5,189	48.6	
Republican	Willou Smith	3,017	28.2	
Republican	Ed Boshears	2,481	23.2	

Georgia Senate District 6 General Election, 1998
Party	Candidate	Votes	%	±%
Republican	Tommie Williams	20,622	65.5	
Democratic	Kathy Keith	10,838	34.5	

=== 2000 ===
Georgia Senate District 6 General Election, 2000
Party	Candidate	Votes	%	±%
Republican	Tommie Williams	30,683	72.9	
Democratic	Eric Wilson	11,426	27.1	

=== 2002 ===
Georgia Senate District 19 General Election, 2002
Party	Candidate	Votes	%	±%
Republican	Tommie Williams	20,580	65.0	
Democratic	Van Streat Jr.	11,060	35.0	

=== 2004 ===
Georgia Senate District 19 General Election, 2004
Party	Candidate	Votes	%	±%
Republican	Tommie Williams	27,695	62.7	
Democratic	Hugh McCullough	16,449	37.3	

=== 2006 ===
Georgia Senate District 19 General Election, 2006
Party	Candidate	Votes	%	±%
Republican	Tommie Williams	23,938	100.0	

=== 2008 ===
Georgia Senate District 19 General Election, 2008
Party	Candidate	Votes	%	±%
Republican	Tommie Williams	39,766	100.0	

=== 2010 ===
Georgia Senate District 19 General Election, 2010
Party	Candidate	Votes	%	±%
Republican	Tommie Williams	26,774	100.0	

=== 2012 ===
Georgia Senate District 19 General Election, 2012
Party	Candidate	Votes	%	±%
Republican	Tommie Williams	41,457	100.0	

=== 2014 ===
Georgia Senate District 19 General Election, 2014
Party	Candidate	Votes	%	±%
Republican	Tommie Williams	27,053	100.0	
