= 2010 Georgia State Senate election =

Georgia State Senate elections, 2010
- November 2, 2010

All 56 seats in the Georgia State Senate 29 (Note: Because the Lieutenant Governor has the power to break ties in the Senate, a Senate majority requires either 29 seats or 28 seats with control of the Lieutenant Governor's office.) seats needed for a majority
	Majority party	Minority party
Leader	Tommie Williams	Robert Brown
Party	Republican	Democratic
Leader's seat	19th-Lyons	26th-Macon
Last election	34	22
Seats won	35	21
Seat change	▲1	▼1
- Results: Republican gain Republican hold Democratic hold
President pro tempore before election
Tommie Williams
Republican
Elected President pro tempore
Tommie Williams
Republican

The 2010 Georgia State Senate elections occurred on November 2, 2010, to elect the members to the Georgia State Senate. All fifty-six seats in the state Senate and all 180 seats in the state House were up for two year terms. The winners of this election cycle served in the 151st Georgia General Assembly.

Democrat Tim Golden became a Republican shortly after the election, which gave Republicans a 36–20 majority.

== Special elections ==
All the following special elections occurred on May 11, with runoffs to be held on June 8 if necessary.

- Senate district 42: Senator David I. Adelman (D) was appointed to serve as United States Ambassador to Singapore and resigned upon being confirmed by the United States Senate.
- Senate district 49: Senator Lee Hawkins (R) resigned to focus on his campaign for the United States House of Representatives in Georgia's 9th congressional district.

== Retiring incumbent Senators ==
=== Democrats ===
- J.B. Powell (District-23): to run for Commissioner of Agriculture
- Gail Buckner (District-44): to run for Secretary of State of Georgia

=== Republicans ===
- Jeff Chapman (District-3): to run for Governor
- John Douglas (District-17): to run for the Georgia Public Service Commission
- Seth Harp (District-29): to run for Insurance Commissioner
- Dan Weber (District-40): retiring, not seeking other office
- Ralph Hudgens (District-47): to run for Insurance Commissioner
- Preston Smith (District-52): to run for state Attorney General
- Don Thomas (District-54): retiring, not seeking other office
- Dan Moody (District-56): retiring, not seeking other office

== Incumbents defeated in primary ==
- John J. Wiles (R-District-37) (elected in 2004) was defeated by Lindsey Tippins.

== Predictions ==
Source	Ranking	As of
Governing	Safe R	November 1, 2010

== Election results ==
On election day, one seat changed hands, with Republicans winning the seat formerly held by J. B. Powell. Senator Tim Golden's switch to the Republicans would give them an additional seat, though that is not recorded in the table below.

District	Incumbent	Party	Elected	Status	2010 candidates
1	Buddy Carter	Republican	2009	Re-elected	Buddy Carter (R) 70.33% Carry Smith (D) 29.68%
2	Lester G. Jackson	Democratic	2008	Re-elected	Lester G. Jackson (D) 72.56% Michael Gaster (R) 27.44%
3	Jeff Chapman	Republican	2004	Retired; Republican hold	William Ligon (R) 71.03% Griffin Lotson (D) 28.97%
4	Jack Hill	Republican	1990	Re-elected	Jack Hill (R) unopposed
5	Curt Thompson	Democratic	2004	Re-elected	Curt Thompson (D) 64.66% Garry Guan (R) 35.34%
6	Doug Stoner	Democratic	2004	Re-elected	Doug Stoner (D) 56.51% Beth Pollard (R) 43.49%
7	Greg Goggans	Republican	2004	Re-elected	Greg Goggans (R) unopposed
8	Tim Golden	Democratic	1998	Re-elected	Tim Golden (D) unopposed
9	Don Balfour	Republican	1992	Re-elected	Don Balfour 64.46% (R); Rashid Malik (D) 35.54%
10	Emanuel Jones	Democratic	2004	Re-elected	Emanuel Jones (D) unopposed
11	John Bulloch	Republican	2002	Re-elected	John Bulloch (R) unopposed
12	Freddie P. Sims	Democratic	2008	Re-elected	Freddie P. Sims (D) unopposed
13	John D. Crosby	Republican	2008	Re-elected	John Crosby (R) unopposed
14	George Hooks	Democratic	1990	Re-elected	George Hooks (D) unopposed
15	Ed Harbison	Democratic	1992	Re-elected	Ed Harbison (D) unopposed
16	Ronnie Chance	Republican	2004	Re-elected	Ronnie Chance (R) unopposed
17	John Douglas	Republican	2004	Retired; Republican hold	Rick Jeffares 64.06% (R); Jim Nichols (D) 35.95%
18	Cecil Staton	Republican	2004	Re-elected	Cecil Staton (R) unopposed
19	Tommie Williams	Republican	1998	Re-elected	Tommie Williams (R) unopposed
20	Ross Tolleson	Republican	2002	Re-elected	Ross Tolleson (R) unopposed
21	Chip Rogers	Republican	2004	Re-elected	Chip Rogers (R) 80.04% Patrick Thompson (D) 19.96%
22	Hardie Davis	Democratic	2010	Re-elected	Hardie Davis (D) unopposed
23	J.B. Powell	Democratic	2004	Retired; Republican pickup	Jesse Stone (R) 93.51; Diane Evans (I) 6.49%
24	Bill Jackson	Republican	2007	Re-elected	Bill Jackson (R) unopposed
25	Johnny Grant	Republican	2004	Re-elected	Johnny Grant (R) 62.31% Floyd Griffin (D) 37.69%
26	Robert Brown	Democratic	1991	Re-elected	Robert Brown (D) unopposed
27	Jack Murphy	Republican	2006	Re-elected	Jack Murphy (R) unopposed
28	Mitch Seabaugh	Republican	2000	Re-elected	Mitch Seabaugh (R) unopposed
29	Seth Harp	Republican	2000	Retired; Republican hold	Joshua McKoon (R) 65.68% Evelyn Thompson Anderson (D) 34.32%
30	Bill Hamrick	Republican	2000	Re-elected	Bill Hamrick (R) 67.91% Pat Rhudy (D) 32.09%
31	Bill Heath	Republican	2004	Re-elected	Bill Heath (R) 72.17% Tracy Gene Bennett (D) 27.83%
32	Judson Hill	Republican	2004	Re-elected	Judson Hill (R) unopposed
33	Steve Thompson	Democratic	1990	Re-elected	Steve Thompson (D) 58.71% Craig Prewett (R) 41.29%
34	Valencia Seay	Democratic	2002	Running	Valencia Seay (D) 74.01% Tiger Billingslea (R) 25.99%
35	Donzella James	Democratic	1993/2009	Running	Donzella James (D) unopposed
36	Nan Grogan Orrock	Democratic	2006	Re-elected	Nan Orrock (D) unopposed
37	John J. Wiles	Republican	2004	Defeated in primary; Republican hold	Lindsey Tippins (R) unopposed
38	Horacena Tate	Democratic	1998	Re-elected	Horacena Tate (D) 64.06% Beth Beskin (R) 35.94%
39	Vincent Fort	Democratic	1996	Re-elected	Vincent Fort (D) unopposed
40	Dan Weber	Republican	2004	Retired; Republican hold	Fran Millar (R) 65.33% Eric Christ (D) 34.67%
41	Steve Henson	Democratic	1990/2002	Re-elected	Steve Henson (D) 57.51% Alex Johnson (R) 42.49%
42	Jason Carter	Democratic	2010	Re-elected	Jason Carter (D) unopposed
43	Ronald Ramsey, Jr.	Democratic	2006	Re-elected	Ronald Ramsey, Jr. (D) 79.84% Diana Williams (R) 20.16%
44	Gail Buckner	Democratic	2008	Retired; Democratic hold	Gail Davenport (D) 97.17% Carlotta Harrell (I) 2.83%
45	Renee Unterman	Republican	2002	Re-elected	Renee Unterman (R) unopposed
46	William Cowsert	Republican	2006	Re-elected	William Cowsert (R) unopposed
47	Ralph Hudgens	Republican	2002	Retired; Republican hold	Frank Ginn (R) 65.33% Tim Riley (D) 34.67%
48	David Shafer	Republican	2002	Re-elected	David Shafer (R) unopposed
49	Butch Miller	Republican	2010	Re-elected	Butch Miller (R) unopposed
50	Jim Butterworth	Republican	2008	Re-elected	Jim Butterworth (R) unopposed
51	Chip Pearson	Republican	2004	Retired; Republican hold	Steve Gooch (R) 81.92% Joseph Mann (D) 18.08%
52	Preston Smith	Republican	2002	Retired; Republican hold	Barry Loudermilk (R) 75.06% Mike Burton (D) 24.94%
53	Jeff Mullis	Republican	2000	Re-elected	Jeff Mullis (R) unopposed
54	Don Thomas	Republican	1996	Retired; Republican hold	Charlie Bethel (R) unopposed
55	Gloria Butler	Democratic	1998	Re-elected	Gloria Butler (D) unopposed
56	Dan Moody	Republican	2002	Retired; Republican hold	John Albers (R) unopposed

== See also ==
- United States elections, 2010
- United States House of Representatives elections in Georgia, 2010
- Georgia elections, 2010
- Georgia gubernatorial election, 2010
- Georgia lieutenant gubernatorial election, 2010
- Georgia Secretary of State election, 2010
- Georgia House of Representatives election, 2010
- Elections in Georgia (U.S. state)
- List of Georgia state legislatures
