= 2007 United States House of Representatives elections =

- July 17, 2007 – December 11, 2007

5 of the 435 seats in the U.S. House of Representatives 218 seats needed for a majority
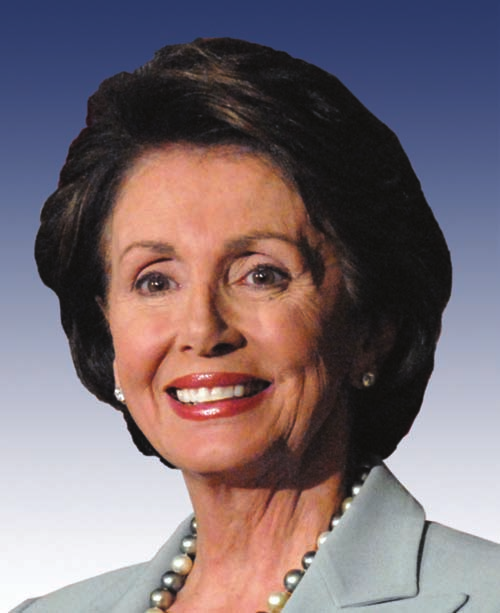

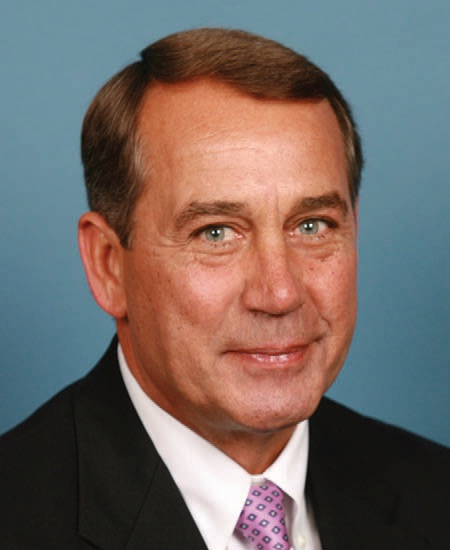
	Majority party	Minority party
Leader	Nancy Pelosi	John Boehner
Party	Democratic	Republican
Leader since	January 3, 2003	February 2, 2006
Leader's seat	California 8th	Ohio 8th
Last election	233	202
Seats won	2	3
Seat change	Steady	Steady
Popular vote	138,433	199,157
Percentage	40.16%	57.78%

There were five special elections for seats in the United States House of Representatives in 2007 to the 110th United States Congress.

Four of the elections were held after the death of the incumbent, while the seat in Massachusetts's 5th congressional district opened up after Marty Meehan resigned to become the Chancellor of the University of Massachusetts Lowell.

In all of these special elections, the incumbent party won.

== Summary ==
Elections are listed by date and district.

District	Incumbent			This race	
District	Member	Party	First elected	Results	Candidates
Georgia 10	Charlie Norwood	Republican	1994	Incumbent died February 13, 2007. New member elected July 17, 2007. Republican hold.	▌ ✓ Paul Broun (Republican) 50.42%; ▌Jim Whitehead (Republican) 49.58%
California 37	Juanita Millender-McDonald	Democratic	1996 (special)	Incumbent died April 22, 2007. New member elected August 21, 2007. Democratic hold.	▌ ✓ Laura Richardson (Democratic) 65.63%; ▌John Kanaley (Republican) 24.62%; ▌Daniel Brezenoff (Green) 5.37%; ▌Herb Peters (Libertarian) 2.27%
Massachusetts 5	Marty Meehan	Democratic	1992	Incumbent resigned July 1, 2007 to become Chancellor of UMass Lowell. New member elected October 16, 2007. Democratic hold.	▌ ✓ Niki Tsongas (Democratic) 51.32%; ▌Jim Ogonowski (Republican) 45.10%; ▌Patrick O. Murphy (Independent) 2.05%; ▌Kurt Hayes (Independent) 1.06%; ▌Kevin Thompson (Constitution) 0.47%
Ohio 5	Paul Gillmor	Republican	1988	Incumbent died September 5, 2007. New member elected December 11, 2007. Republican hold.	▌ ✓ Bob Latta (Republican) 56.96%; ▌Robin Weirauch (Democratic) 42.87%
Virginia 1	Jo Ann Davis	Republican	2000	Incumbent died October 6, 2007. New member elected December 11, 2007. Republican hold.	▌ ✓ Rob Wittman (Republican) 60.77%; ▌Philip Forgit (Democratic) 37.34%; ▌Lucky Narain (Independent) 1.78%

== Georgia's 10th congressional district ==
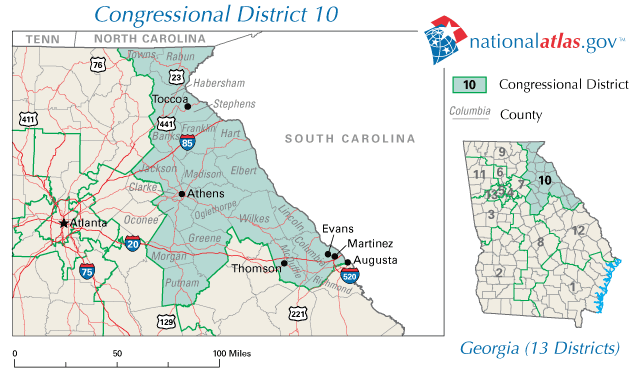
Georgia's 10th congressional district

2007 Georgia's 10th congressional district special election
Party	Candidate	Votes	%
Republican	Paul Broun	23,529	50.42
Republican	Jim Whitehead	23,135	49.58
Majority		394	0.84
Total votes		46,664	100.00
Republican hold			

== California's 37th congressional district ==
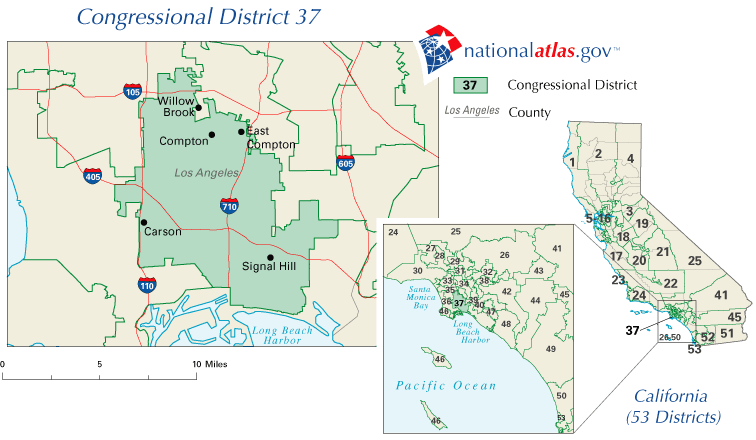
California's 37th congressional district

2007 California's 37th congressional district special election
Party	Candidate	Votes	%	±%
Democratic	Laura Richardson	15,559	67.00	▼15.40
Republican	John Kanaley	5,837	25.14	
Green	Daniel Brezenoff	1,274	5.49	
Libertarian	Herb Peters	538	2.32	▼15.28
Write-in		13	0.06	
Majority		9,722	41.87	▼22.92
Total votes		23,221	100.00	
Democratic hold				

== Massachusetts's 5th congressional district ==
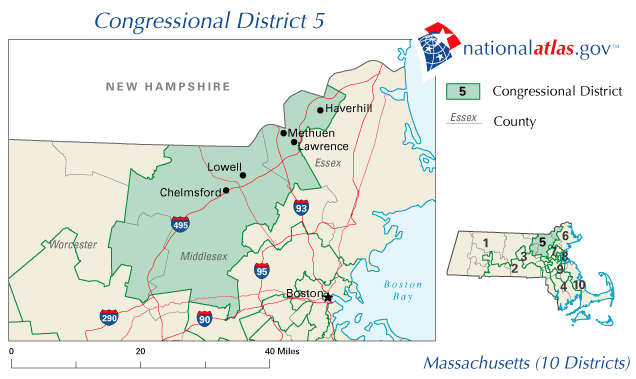
Massachusetts's 5th congressional district

2007 Massachusetts's 5th congressional district special election
Party	Candidate	Votes	%	±%
Democratic	Niki Tsongas	54,363	51.32	▼46.74
Republican	Jim Ogonowski	47,770	45.10	
Independent	Patrick O. Murphy	2,170	2.05	
Independent	Kurt Hayes	1,125	1.06	
Constitution	Kevin Thompson	494	0.47	
Majority		6,593	6.22	▼89.90
Total votes		105,922	100.00	
Democratic hold				

== Ohio's 5th congressional district ==
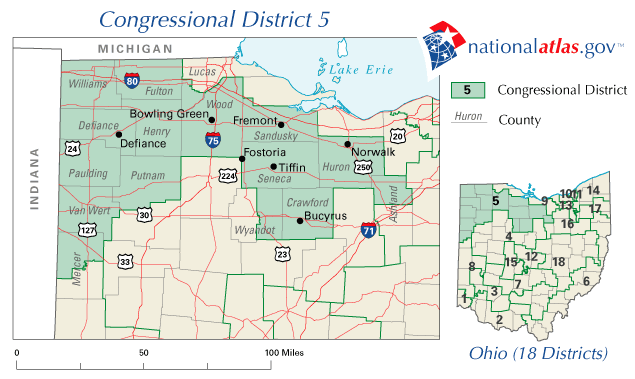
Ohio's 5th congressional district

2007 Ohio's 5th congressional district special election
Party	Candidate	Votes	%	±%
Republican	Bob Latta	56,114	56.96	▲0.11
Democratic	Robin Weirauch	42,229	42.87	▼0.28
Write-in		167	0.17	
Majority		13,885	14.10	▲0.41
Total votes		98,510	100.00	
Republican hold				

== Virginia's 1st congressional district ==
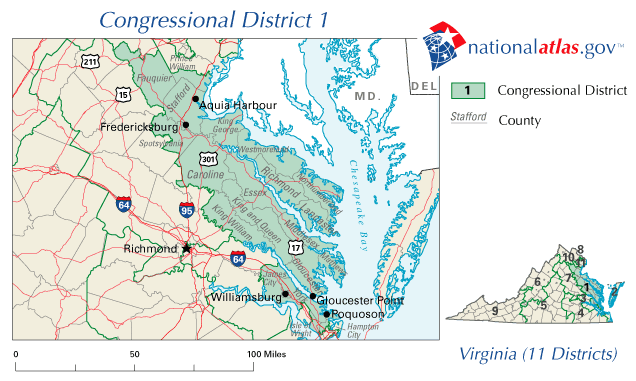
Virginia's 1st congressional district

2007 Virginia's 1st congressional district special election
Party	Candidate	Votes	%	±%
Republican	Rob Wittman	42,772	60.77	▼2.19
Democratic	Philip Forgit	26,282	37.34	▲1.86
Independent	Lucky R. Narain	1,253	1.78	▲0.36
Write-in		75	0.11	▼0.03
Majority		16,490	23.43	▼4.05
Total votes		70,382	100.00	
Republican hold				

== See also ==
- List of special elections to the United States House of Representatives
