= 2016 United States Senate election in Georgia =

- November 8, 2016
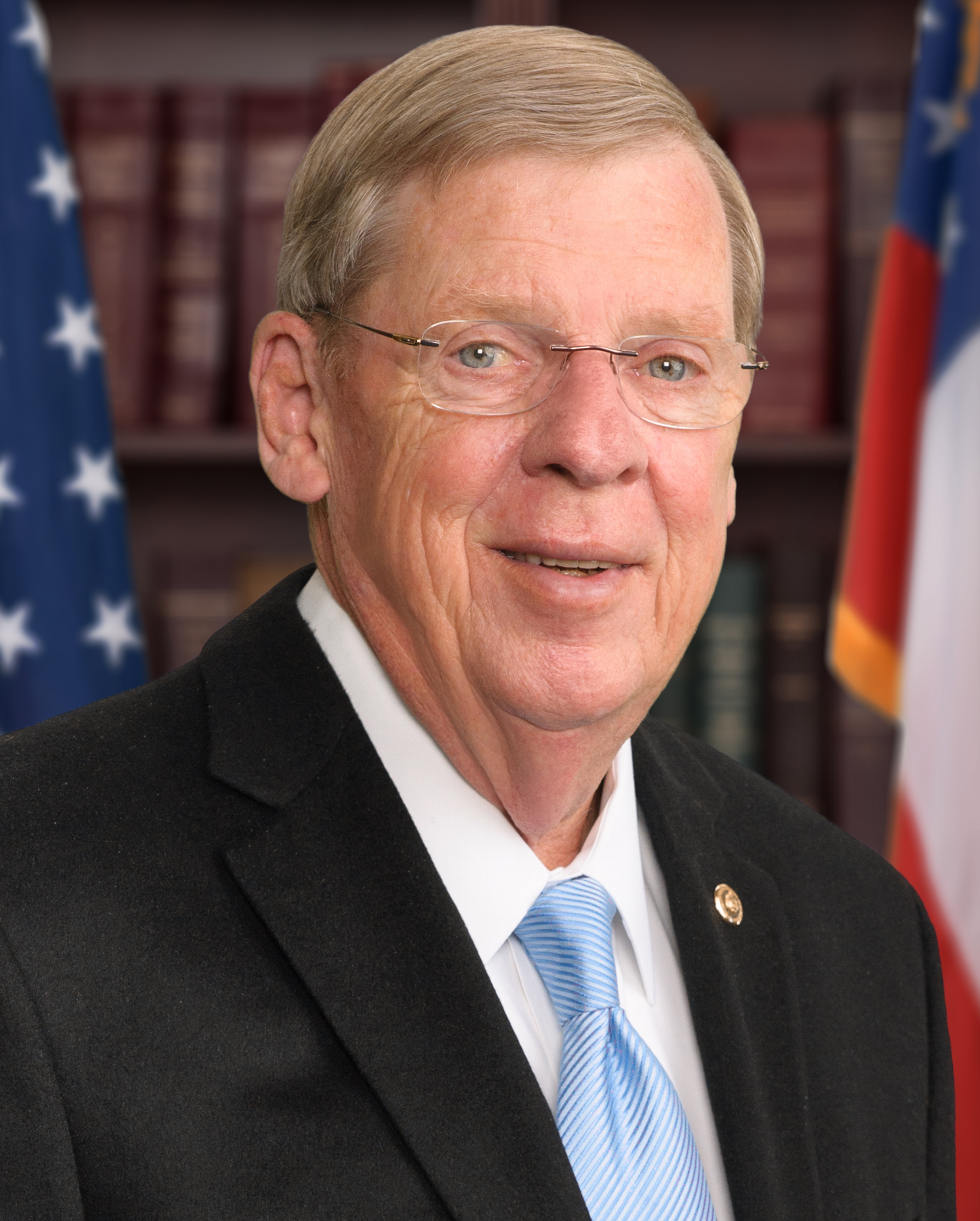

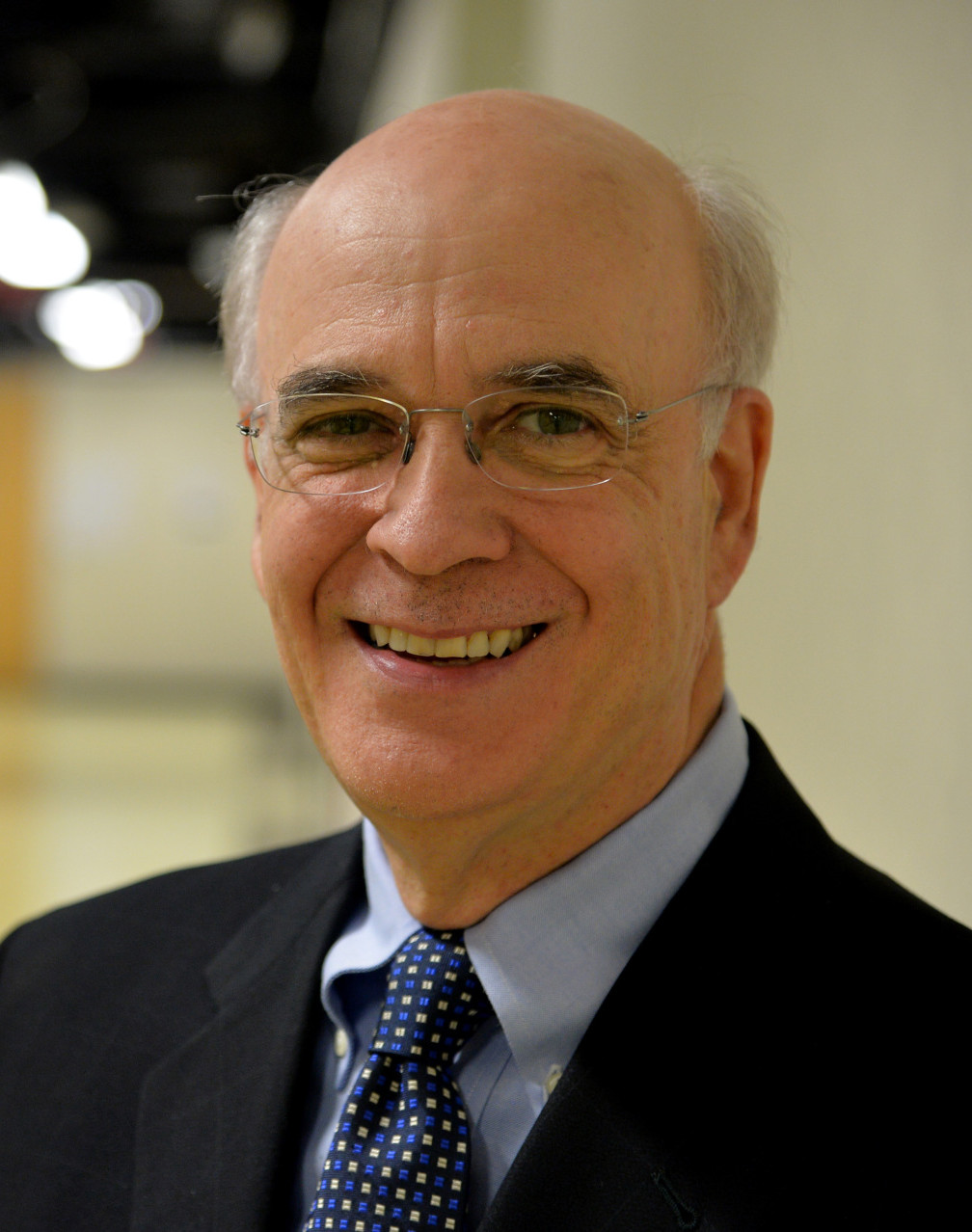
| Nominee | Johnny Isakson | Jim Barksdale |
| Party | Republican | Democratic |
| Popular vote | 2,135,806 | 1,599,726 |
| Percentage | 54.80% | 41.04% |
- Isakson: 40–50% 50–60% 60–70% 70–80% 80–90% >90% Barksdale: 40–50% 50–60% 60–70% 70–80% 80–90% >90% Tie: 40–50% 50% No data
U.S. senator before election
Johnny Isakson
Republican
Elected U.S. senator
Johnny Isakson
Republican

The 2016 United States Senate election in Georgia was held November 8, 2016, to elect a member of the United States Senate to represent the State of Georgia, concurrently with the 2016 U.S. presidential election, as well as other elections to the United States Senate in other states and elections to the United States House of Representatives, and various state and local elections. The primary election for the Republican and Democratic parties took place on May 24, 2016.

Incumbent Senator Johnny Isakson won re-election to a third term in office by a wide margin. He later resigned from the Senate on December 31, 2019, due to health issues. As of 2026, this remains the last time Republicans have won a Senate election in Georgia, as well as the last time that suburban Gwinnett and Henry counties have voted Republican in a statewide election.

== Republican primary ==
=== Candidates ===
==== Declared ====
- Mary Kay Bacallao, college professor, former Fayette County Board of Education member and candidate for state superintendent of schools in 2014
- Derrick Grayson, MARTA engineer, minister and candidate for the U.S. Senate in 2014
- Johnny Isakson, incumbent U.S. senator

==== Withdrawn ====
- Lee Benedict, teacher and state senate candidate in 2007 (running for the Columbia County Commission)

==== Declined ====
- Paul Broun, former U.S. representative and candidate for the U.S. Senate in 1996 and 2014 (running for GA-09)
- Tom Graves, U.S. representative
- Kelly Loeffler, owner of the Atlanta Dream and future U.S. senator for this seat
- Tom Price, U.S. representative
- Allen West, former U.S. representative from Florida

=== Endorsements ===
Johnny Isakson

Governors

- Nathan Deal, governor of Georgia

U.S. representatives

- Doug Collins, Georgia
- Phil Gingrey, Georgia (former) and candidate for the U.S. Senate in 2014
- Tom Graves, Georgia
- Jack Kingston, Georgia (former) and candidate for the U.S. Senate in 2014
- Barry Loudermilk, Georgia's 11th congressional district
- David Scott, Georgia (Democratic)
- Lynn Westmoreland, Georgia

State senators

- David Shafer, president pro tempore of the Georgia State Senate

State representatives

- David Ralston, speaker of the Georgia House of Representatives

Statewide officials

- Gary Black, agriculture commissioner
- Casey Cagle, lieutenant governor of Georgia
- Brian Kemp, secretary of state of Georgia

Individuals

- Carly Fiorina, former CEO of Hewlett-Packard, 2010 Republican nominee for Senate in California, and 2016 presidential candidate

=== Polling ===
| Poll source | Date(s) administered | Sample size | Margin of error | Johnny Isakson | Another candidate | Undecided |
|---|---|---|---|---|---|---|
| InsiderAdvantage | June 11–14, 2015 | 492 | ± 4.4% | 50% | 26% | 24% |

=== Results ===
Results by county: Map legend: Isakson—80–90%; Isakson—70–80%; Isakson—60–70%; Isakson—50–60%

Republican primary results
| Party | Candidate | Votes | % |
|---|---|---|---|
| Republican | Johnny Isakson (incumbent) | 447,661 | 77.50% |
| Republican | Derrick Grayson | 69,101 | 11.96% |
| Republican | Mary Kay Bacallao | 60,898 | 10.54% |
| Total votes | | 577,660 | 100.00% |

== Democratic primary ==
=== Candidates ===
==== Declared ====
- James F. Barksdale, investment firm executive
- Cheryl Copeland, AT&T manager
- John Coyne, businessman and perennial candidate

==== Withdrawn ====
- Jim Knox, information technologist and United States Air Force veteran

==== Declined ====
- Stacey Abrams, minority leader of the Georgia House of Representatives
- Thurbert Baker, former attorney general of Georgia and candidate for governor in 2010
- Roy Barnes, former governor
- John Barrow, former U.S. representative
- Jason Carter, state senator and nominee for governor of Georgia in 2014
- Stacey Evans, state representative
- Shirley Franklin, former mayor of Atlanta
- Scott Holcomb, state representative and candidate for secretary of state in 2006
- Margaret Kaiser, state representative
- Jim Marshall, former U.S. representative
- Michelle Nunn, former CEO of Points of Light and nominee for the U.S. Senate in 2014
- Kasim Reed, mayor of Atlanta
- Michael Sterling, executive director of the Atlanta Workforce Development Agency, former assistant United States attorney and former adviser to Mayor Kasim Reed
- Doug Stoner, former state senator
- Ed Tarver, United States attorney for the Southern District of Georgia and former state senator
- Regina Thomas, former state senator and candidate for GA-12 in 2008 and 2010
- Teresa Tomlinson, mayor of Columbus
- Raphael Warnock, pastor of Ebenezer Baptist Church and future U.S. Senator for this seat

=== Results ===
Results by county: Map legend: Barksdale—80–90%; Barksdale—60–70%; Barksdale—50–60%; Barksdale—40–50%; Copeland—40–50%; Copeland—50–60%; Copeland—60–70%; Copeland—70–80%

Democratic primary results
| Party | Candidate | Votes | % |
|---|---|---|---|
| Democratic | Jim Barksdale | 166,627 | 53.74% |
| Democratic | Cheryl Copeland | 130,822 | 42.19% |
| Democratic | John Coyne | 12,604 | 4.07% |
| Total votes | | 310,053 | 100.00% |

== Libertarian nomination ==
=== Candidates ===
==== Declared ====
- Allen Buckley, attorney, accountant, nominee for the U.S. Senate in 2004 and 2008 and nominee for lieutenant governor of Georgia in 2006
- Ted Metz, insurance agent, former Cobb County Republican district chairman, and nominee for insurance commissioner in 2014

Allen Buckley won the nomination at the March 5, 2016 nominating convention in Marietta.

== General election ==
=== Debates ===
| Dates | Location | Isakson | Barksdale | Buckley | Link |
|---|---|---|---|---|---|
| October 21, 2016 | Atlanta, Georgia | Participant | Participant | Participant | |

=== Polling ===
View source data.

| Poll source | Date(s) administered | Sample size | Margin of error | Johnny Isakson (R) | Jim Barksdale (D) | Allen Buckley (L) | Other | Undecided |
|---|---|---|---|---|---|---|---|---|
| SurveyMonkey | November 1–7, 2016 | 2,419 | ± 4.6% | 47% | 41% | 8% | — | 4% |
| WSB-TV/Landmark | November 6, 2016 | 1,200 | ± 2.8% | 52% | 41% | 4% | — | 3% |
| SurveyMonkey | October 31–November 6, 2016 | 2,348 | ± 4.6% | 47% | 41% | 8% | — | 4% |
| CBS News/YouGov | November 3–5, 2016 | 995 | ± 4.6% | 48% | 41% | — | 6% | 5% |
| WSB-TV/Landmark | November 2–3, 2016 | 1,000 | ± 3.1% | 50% | 40% | 5% | — | 6% |
| FOX 5 Atlanta/Opinion Savvy | November 2–3, 2016 | 538 | ± 4.2% | 50% | 39% | 8% | — | 3% |
| SurveyMonkey | October 28–November 3, 2016 | 2,872 | ± 4.6% | 47% | 42% | 8% | — | 3% |
| SurveyMonkey | October 27–November 2, 2016 | 2,722 | ± 4.6% | 47% | 42% | 7% | — | 4% |
| NBC/WSJ/Marist | October 30–November 1, 2016 | 707 LV | ± 3.7% | 48% | 37% | 7% | 3% | 5% |
| NBC/WSJ/Marist | October 30–November 1, 2016 | 937 RV | ± 3.2% | 46% | 36% | 8% | 4% | 7% |
| SurveyMonkey | October 26–November 1, 2016 | 2,678 | ± 4.6% | 48% | 41% | 6% | — | 5% |
| Emerson College | October 29–31, 2016 | 650 | ± 3.8% | 48% | 40% | — | 5% | 7% |
| SurveyMonkey | October 25–31, 2016 | 2,665 | ± 4.6% | 50% | 41% | 5% | — | 4% |
| WXIA-TV Atlanta/SurveyUSA | October 25–27, 2016 | 594 | ± 4.1% | 50% | 38% | 5% | — | 8% |
| Quinnipiac University | October 20–26, 2016 | 707 | ± 3.7% | 54% | 40% | — | — | 6% |
| FOX 5 Atlanta/Opinion Savvy | October 20, 2016 | 570 | ± 4.1% | 51% | 42% | 3% | — | 4% |
| Google Consumer Surveys | October 18–20, 2016 | 439 | ± 4.2% | 58% | 36% | — | — | 6% |
| Atlanta Journal Constitution | October 17–20, 2016 | 839 | ± 4.3% | 47% | 32% | 11% | — | 7% |
| The Times-Picayune/Lucid | October 17–18, 2016 | 807 | ± 3.0% | 49% | 39% | — | — | 13% |
| Washington Post/SurveyMonkey | October 8–16, 2016 | 886 | ± 0.5% | 50% | 46% | — | — | 4% |
| WSB-TV/Landmark | October 11–12, 2016 | 1,400 | ± 2.7% | 50% | 37% | 5% | — | 8% |
| JMC Analytics (R) | September 20–22, 2016 | 600 | ± 4.0% | 41% | 28% | 4% | — | 27% |
| Quinnipiac University | September 13–21, 2016 | 638 | ± 3.9% | 55% | 34% | — | — | 10% |
| Monmouth University | September 15–18, 2016 | 401 | ± 4.9% | 50% | 34% | 5% | — | 10% |
| FOX 5 Atlanta/Opinion Savvy | September 14, 2016 | 568 | ± 4.1% | 47% | 34% | 6% | — | 13% |
| Emerson College | September 9–13, 2016 | 600 | ± 3.6% | 48% | 32% | — | — | 10% |
| NBC/WSJ/Marist | September 6–8, 2016 | 649 | ± 3.8% | 53% | 38% | — | — | 9% |
| JMC Analytics (R) | August 6–7, 2016 | 615 | ± 4.0% | 39% | 30% | 4% | — | 27% |
| Atlanta Journal Constitution | August 1–4, 2016 | 847 | ± 4.0% | 44% | 38% | 6% | — | 12% |
| Atlanta Journal Constitution | August 1–4, 2016 | 847 | ± 4.0% | 48% | 42% | — | — | 10% |
| WSB-TV/Landmark | July 31, 2016 | 787 | ± 4.0% | 46% | 41% | 5% | — | 8% |
| WXIA-TV Atlanta/SurveyUSA | July 29–31, 2016 | 570 | ± 4.2% | 48% | 39% | 5% | — | 8% |
| Public Policy Polling | May 27–30, 2016 | 724 | ± 3.6% | 47% | 35% | — | — | 18% |

=== Predictions ===
| Source | Ranking | As of |
|---|---|---|
| The Cook Political Report | Likely R | November 2, 2016 |
| Sabato's Crystal Ball | Safe R | November 7, 2016 |
| Rothenberg Political Report | Safe R | November 3, 2016 |
| Daily Kos | Safe R | November 8, 2016 |
| Real Clear Politics | Likely R | November 7, 2016 |

=== Results ===
State senate district results

United States Senate election in Georgia, 2016
| Party | Candidate | Votes | % | ±% |
|---|---|---|---|---|
| Republican | Johnny Isakson (incumbent) | 2,135,806 | 54.80% | −3.51% |
| Democratic | Jim Barksdale | 1,599,726 | 41.04% | +2.04% |
| Libertarian | Allen Buckley | 162,260 | 4.16% | +1.47% |
| Total votes | | 3,897,792 | 100.00% | N/A |
| Republican hold | | | | |

==== Counties that flipped from Republican to Democratic ====
- Chatham (largest municipality: Savannah)
- Douglas (largest town: Douglasville)

==== Counties that flipped from Democratic to Republican ====
- Quitman (largest city: Georgetown)
- Twiggs (largest city: Jeffersonville)
- Terrell (largest city: Dawson)
- Randolph (largest city: Cuthbert)

==== By congressional district ====
Isakson won ten of 14 congressional districts.

| District | Isakson | Barksdale | Representative |
|---|---|---|---|
| 1st | 60% | 36% | Buddy Carter |
| 2nd | 47% | 50% | Sanford Bishop |
| 3rd | 67% | 29% | Lynn Westmoreland |
| 3rd | 67% | 29% | Drew Ferguson |
| 4th | 26% | 70% | Hank Johnson |
| 5th | 20% | 76% | John Lewis |
| 6th | 58% | 37% | Tom Price |
| 7th | 56% | 39% | Rob Woodall |
| 8th | 66% | 31% | Austin Scott |
| 9th | 78% | 18% | Doug Collins |
| 10th | 64% | 32% | Jody Hice |
| 11th | 64% | 30% | Barry Loudermilk |
| 12th | 60% | 37% | Rick W. Allen |
| 13th | 30% | 66% | David Scott |
| 14th | 74% | 21% | Tom Graves |
