= 2007 Georgia's 24th state senate district special election =

A special election was held in Georgia's 24th state senate district on June 19, 2007, to replace State Senator Jim Whitehead, who resigned from the seat to run for US Congress in Georgia's 10th congressional district's special election. Four candidates qualified for the election. The election was won by Bill Jackson who received over 62% of the vote.

== Results ==
Georgia's 24th state senate district special election, 2007
Party	Candidate	Votes	%	±%
Republican	Bill Jackson	11,567	62.6%	
Republican	Brett McGuire	3,170	17.2%	
Democratic	Scott Nichols	3,063	16.6%	
Republican	Lee Benedict	682	3.7%	
