= 2008 United States House of Representatives elections in Georgia =

- November 4, 2008

All 13 Georgia seats to the United States House of Representatives
	Majority party	Minority party
Party	Republican	Democratic
Last election	7	6
Seats won	7	6
Seat change	Steady	Steady
Popular vote	1,883,633	1,858,090
Percentage	50.34%	49.66%
Swing	▼4.63%	▲4.63%

Republican
50–60%
60–70%
70–80%
80–90%
Democratic
50–60%
60–70%
70–80%
80–90%
>90%

The 2008 congressional elections in Georgia were held on November 4, 2008, to determine who would represent the state of Georgia in the United States House of Representatives, coinciding with the presidential and senatorial elections. Representatives are elected for two-year terms; those elected will serve in the 111th Congress from January 3, 2009, until January 3, 2011.

Georgia has thirteen seats in the House, apportioned according to the 2000 United States census. Its 2007–2008 congressional delegation consisted of seven Republicans and six Democrats. No districts changed party, although CQ Politics had forecasted districts 8, 12, and 13 to be at some risk for the incumbent party. The general primary was held July 15, 2008.

== Overview ==
United States House of Representatives elections in Georgia, 2008
Party	Votes	Percentage	Seats before	Seats after	+/–
Republican	1,883,633	50.34%	7	7	0
Democratic	1,858,090	49.66%	6	6	0
Others	309	0.0%	0	0	0
Valid votes	-	-%			
Invalid or blank votes	-	-%			
Totals	3,742,032	100.00%	13	13	—
Voter turnout	72.01%				

All information came from the Secretary of State of Georgia website.

=== Match-up summary ===
District	Incumbent	2008 status	Democratic	Republican	Write-in(s)
1	Jack Kingston	Re-election	Bill Gillespie	Jack Kingston	
2	Sanford Bishop	Re-election	Sanford Bishop	Lee Ferrell	
3	Lynn Westmoreland	Re-election	Stephen Camp	Lynn Westmoreland	Loretta VanPelt
4	Hank Johnson	Re-election	Hank Johnson		Loren Christopher Collins; Faye Coffield; Jacob Perasso
5	John Lewis	Re-election	John Lewis		Shira Kash; Jeanne Fitzmaurice
6	Tom Price	Re-election	Bill Jones	Tom Price	
7	John Linder	Re-election	Doug Heckman	John Linder	
8	Jim Marshall	Re-election	Jim Marshall	Rick Goddard	
9	Nathan Deal	Re-election	Jeff Scott	Nathan Deal	
10	Paul Broun	Re-election	Bobby Saxon	Paul Broun	
11	Phil Gingrey	Re-election	Bud Gammon	Phil Gingrey	
12	John Barrow	Re-election	John Barrow	John Stone	
13	David Scott	Re-election	David Scott	Deborah Honeycutt	

== District 1 ==
2008 Georgia's 1st congressional district election
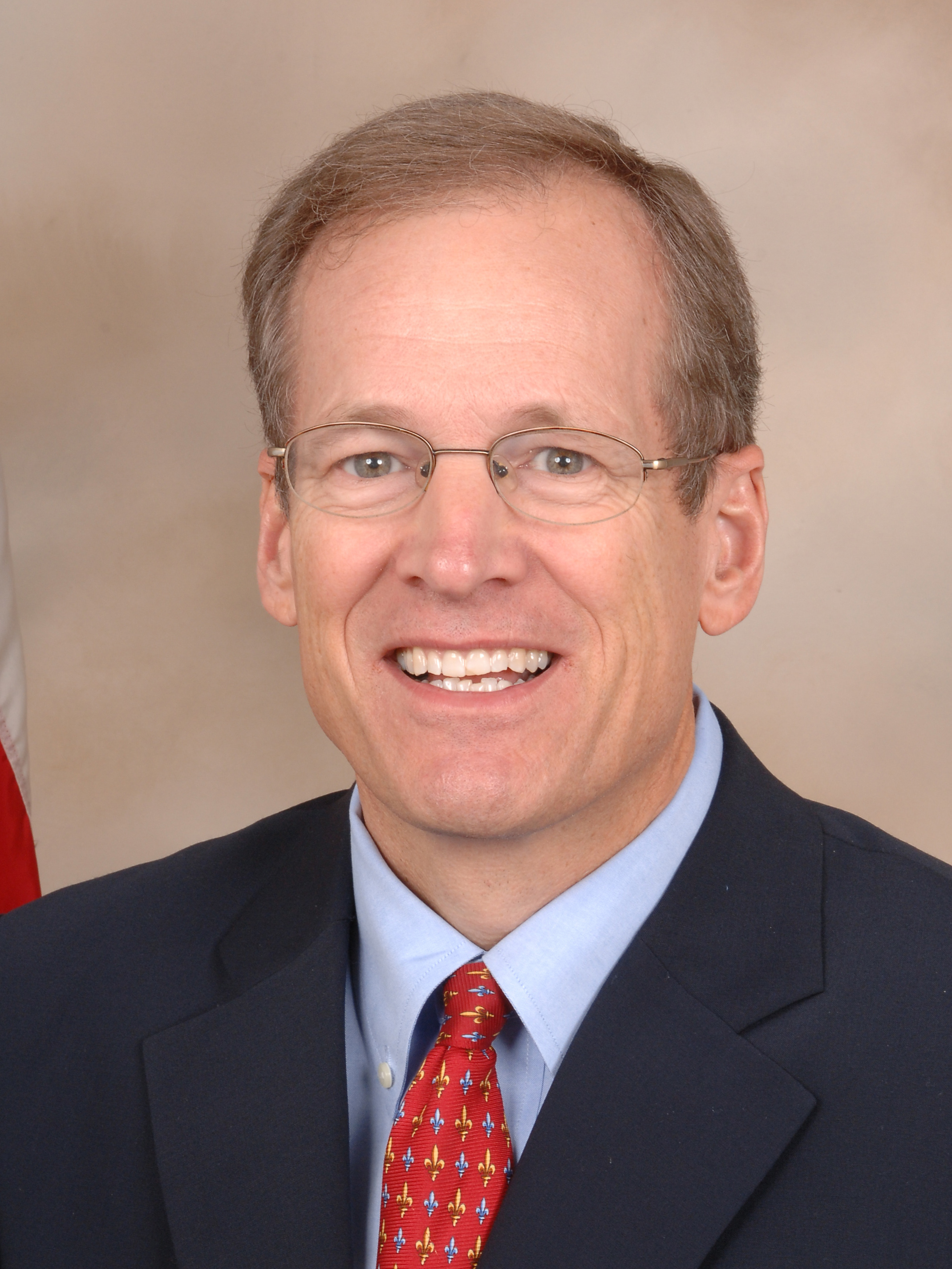

Nominee	Jack Kingston	Bill Gillespie
Party	Republican	Democratic
Popular vote	165,890	83,444
Percentage	66.5%	33.5%
- County results Carter: 50–60% 60–70% 70–80% 80–90% Hewitt: 50–60%
U.S. Representative before election
Jack Kingston
Republican
Elected U.S. Representative
Jack Kingston
Republican

Incumbent Republican Jack Kingston (campaign website) won against Democratic nominee Bill Gillespie (campaign website). CQ Politics forecasted the race as 'Safe Republican'.

- Race ranking and details from CQ Politics
- Campaign contributions from OpenSecrets

=== Predictions ===
Source	Ranking	As of
The Cook Political Report	Safe R	November 6, 2008
Rothenberg	Safe R	November 2, 2008
Sabato's Crystal Ball	Safe R	November 6, 2008
Real Clear Politics	Safe R	November 7, 2008
CQ Politics	Safe R	November 6, 2008

Georgia's 1st congressional district election, 2008
Party	Candidate	Votes	%
Republican	Jack Kingston (incumbent)	165,890	66.5
Democratic	Bill Gillespie	83,444	33.5
Total votes		249,334	100.00
Republican hold			

== District 2 ==
2008 Georgia's 2nd congressional district election
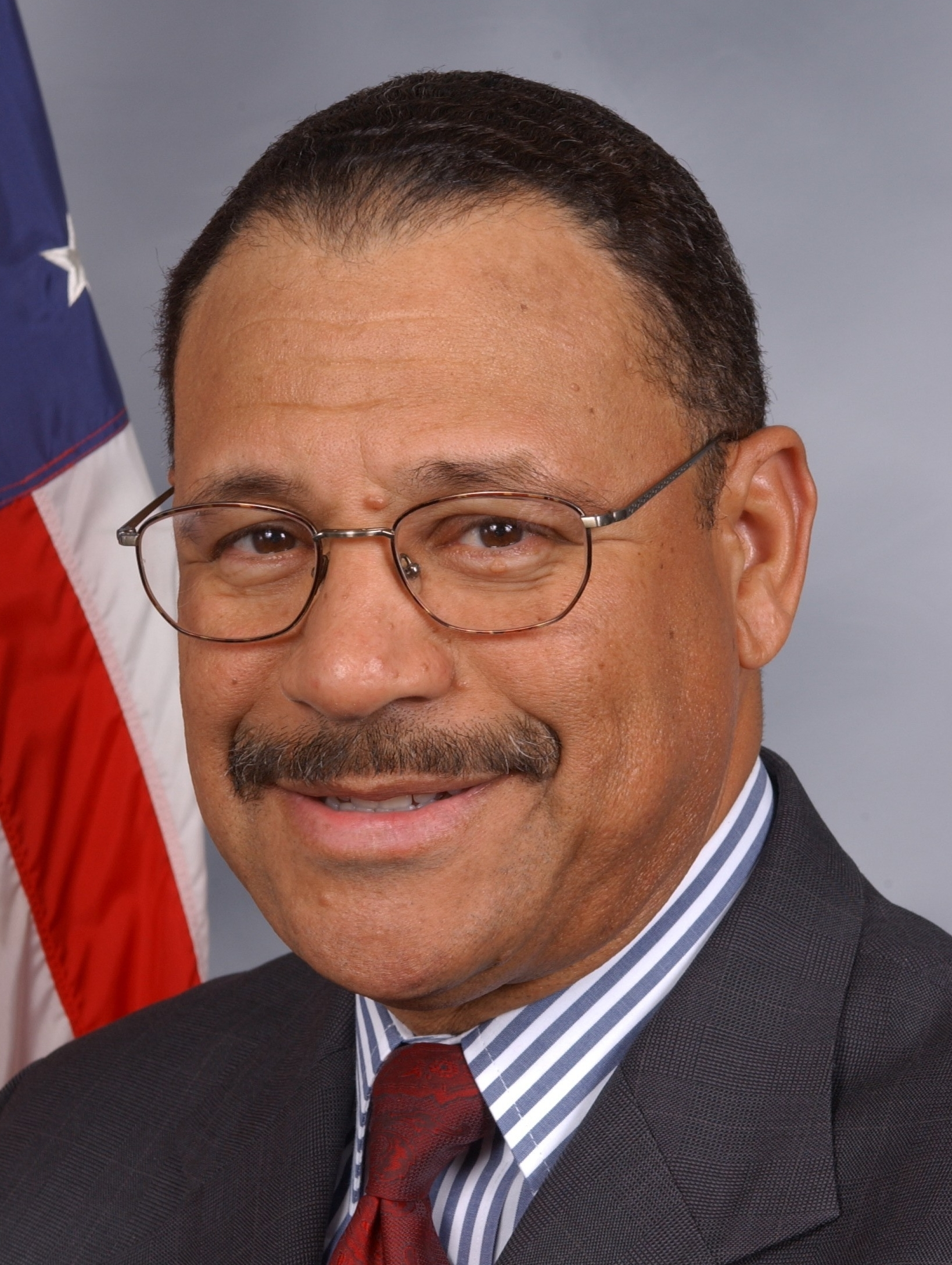

Nominee	Sanford Bishop	Lee Ferrell
Party	Democratic	Republican
Popular vote	158,435	71,351
Percentage	68.9%	31.1%
- County results Bishop: 50–60% 60–70% 70–80% 80–90% Ferrell: 50–60%
U.S. Representative before election
Sanford Bishop
Democratic
Elected U.S. Representative
Sanford Bishop
Democratic

Democratic incumbent Sanford Bishop (campaign website) won against Republican nominee Lee Ferrell (campaign website). CQ Politics forecasted the race as 'Safe Democrat'.

- Race ranking and details from CQ Politics
- Campaign contributions from OpenSecrets

=== Predictions ===
Source	Ranking	As of
The Cook Political Report	Safe D	November 6, 2008
Rothenberg	Safe D	November 2, 2008
Sabato's Crystal Ball	Safe D	November 6, 2008
Real Clear Politics	Safe D	November 7, 2008
CQ Politics	Safe D	November 6, 2008

Georgia's 2nd congressional district election, 2008
Party	Candidate	Votes	%
Democratic	Sanford Bishop (incumbent)	158,435	68.9
Republican	Lee Ferrell	71,351	31.1
Total votes		229,786	100.00
Democratic hold			

== District 3 ==
2008 Georgia's 3rd congressional district election
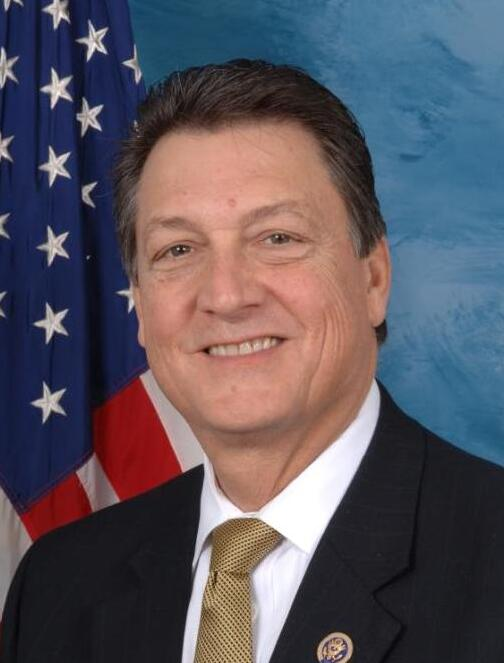

Nominee	Lynn Westmoreland	Stephen Camp
Party	Republican	Democratic
Popular vote	225,055	117,522
Percentage	65.7%	34.3%
- County results Westmoreland: 50–60% 60–70% 70–80%
U.S. Representative before election
Lynn Westmoreland
Republican
Elected U.S. Representative
Lynn Westmoreland
Republican

Republican incumbent Lynn Westmoreland (campaign website) won against Democratic nominee Stephen Camp (campaign website). CQ Politics forecasted the race as 'Safe Republican'.

- Race ranking and details from CQ Politics
- Campaign contributions from OpenSecrets

=== Predictions ===
Source	Ranking	As of
The Cook Political Report	Safe R	November 6, 2008
Rothenberg	Safe R	November 2, 2008
Sabato's Crystal Ball	Safe R	November 6, 2008
Real Clear Politics	Safe R	November 7, 2008
CQ Politics	Safe R	November 6, 2008

Georgia's 3rd congressional district election, 2008
Party	Candidate	Votes	%
Republican	Lynn Westmoreland (incumbent)	225,055	65.7
Democratic	Stephen Camp	117,522	34.3
Independent	Loretta VanPelt (write-in)	3	0.0
Total votes		342,580	100.00
Republican hold			

== District 4 ==
2008 Georgia's 4th congressional district election
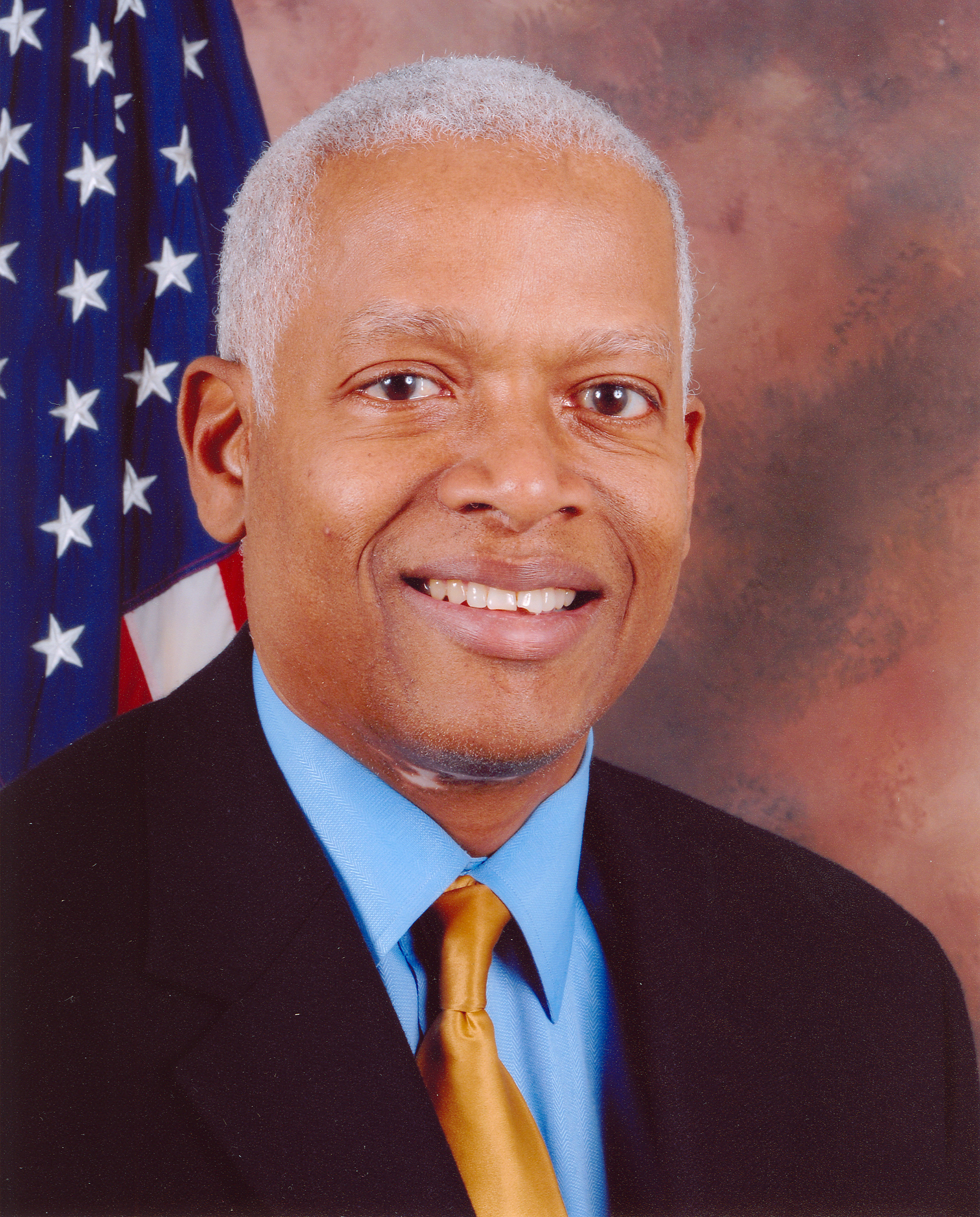
Nominee	Hank Johnson
Party	Democratic
Popular vote	224,494
Percentage	99.9%
U.S. Representative before election
Hank Johnson
Democratic
Elected U.S. Representative
Hank Johnson
Democratic

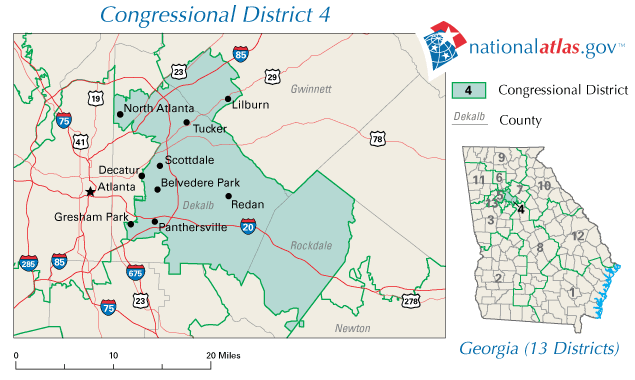

Freshman Democratic incumbent Hank Johnson (campaign website) was unopposed on the ballot and easily defeated three write-in challengers. CQ Politics forecasted the race as 'Safe Democrat'.

- Race ranking and details from CQ Politics
- Campaign contributions from OpenSecrets

=== Predictions ===
Source	Ranking	As of
The Cook Political Report	Safe D	November 6, 2008
Rothenberg	Safe D	November 2, 2008
Sabato's Crystal Ball	Safe D	November 6, 2008
Real Clear Politics	Safe D	November 7, 2008
CQ Politics	Safe D	November 6, 2008

Georgia's 4th congressional district election, 2008
Party	Candidate	Votes	%
Democratic	Hank Johnson (incumbent)	224,494	99.9
Independent	Loren Christopher Collins (write-in)	159	0.1
Independent	Faye Coffield (write-in)	35	0.0
Independent	Jacob Perasso (write-in)	6	0.0
Total votes		224,694	100.00
Democratic hold			

== District 5 ==
2008 Georgia's 5th congressional district election
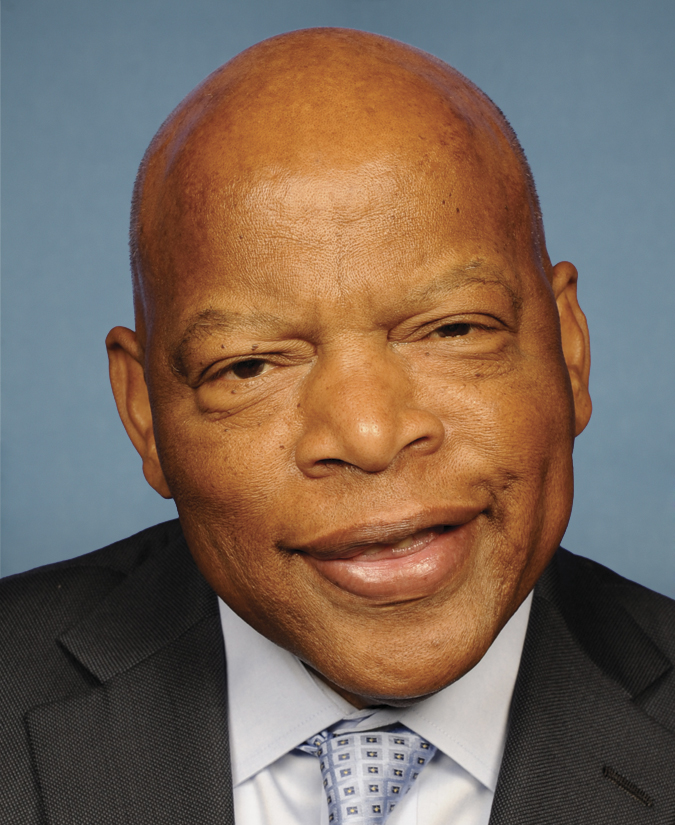

Nominee	John Lewis	Shira Kash
Party	Democratic	Independent
Popular vote	231,368	81
Percentage	100.0%	0.0%
- County results Lewis: 90–100% 100–100%
U.S. Representative before election
John Lewis
Democratic
Elected U.S. Representative
John Lewis
Democratic

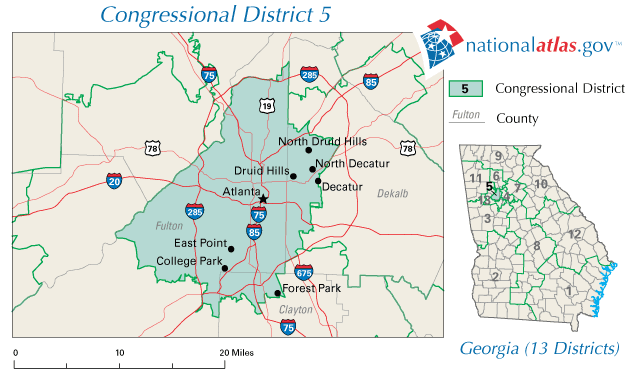

=== Democratic primary ===
==== Candidates ====
===== Nominee =====
- John Lewis, incumbent U.S. representative

===== Eliminated in primary =====
- Markel Hutchins, reverend
- Mable Thomas, state representative

==== Results ====
Democratic primary results
Party	Candidate	Votes	%
Democratic	John Lewis (incumbent)	36,713	69.0
Democratic	Markel Hutchins	8,287	15.6
Democratic	Mable Thomas	8,185	15.4
Total votes		53,185	

=== General election ===
==== Predictions ====
Source	Ranking	As of
The Cook Political Report	Safe D	November 6, 2008
Rothenberg	Safe D	November 2, 2008
Sabato's Crystal Ball	Safe D	November 6, 2008
Real Clear Politics	Safe D	November 7, 2008
CQ Politics	Safe D	November 6, 2008

==== Results ====
Georgia's 5th congressional district election, 2008
Party	Candidate	Votes	%
Democratic	John Lewis (incumbent)	231,368	100.0
Independent	Shira Kash	81	0.0
Independent	Jeanne Fitzmaurice	25	0.0
Total votes		231,474	
Democratic hold			

== District 6 ==
2008 Georgia's 6th congressional district election
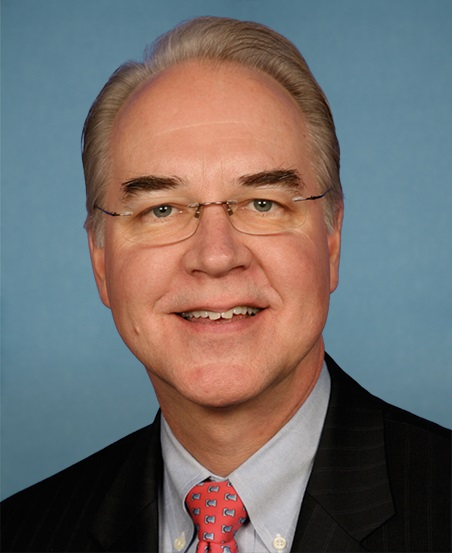

Nominee	Tom Price	Bill Jones
Party	Republican	Democratic
Popular vote	231,520	106,551
Percentage	68.5%	31.5%
- County results Price: 60–70% 70–80%
U.S. Representative before election
Tom Price
Republican
Elected U.S. Representative
Tom Price
Republican

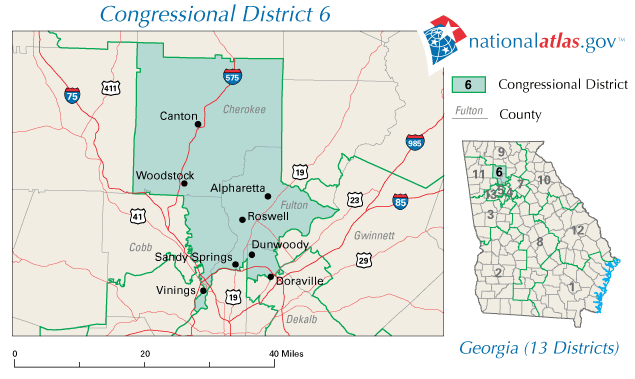

Republican incumbent Tom Price (campaign website) won against Democratic nominee Bill Jones (campaign website), an Air Force veteran and high-tech businessman. CQ Politics forecasted the race as 'Safe Republican'.

- Race ranking and details from CQ Politics
- Campaign contributions from OpenSecrets

=== Predictions ===
Source	Ranking	As of
The Cook Political Report	Safe R	November 6, 2008
Rothenberg	Safe R	November 2, 2008
Sabato's Crystal Ball	Safe R	November 6, 2008
Real Clear Politics	Safe R	November 7, 2008
CQ Politics	Safe R	November 6, 2008

Georgia's 6th congressional district election, 2008
Party	Candidate	Votes	%
Republican	Tom Price (incumbent)	231,520	68.5
Democratic	Bill Jones	106,551	31.5
Total votes		338,071	100.00
Republican hold			

== District 7 ==
2008 Georgia's 7th congressional district election
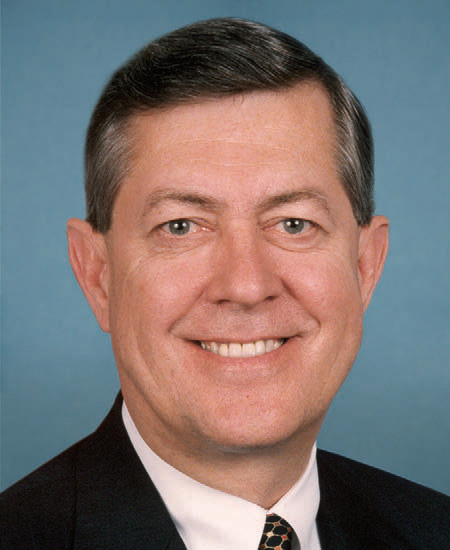

Nominee	John Linder	Doug Heckman
Party	Republican	Democratic
Popular vote	209,354	128,159
Percentage	62.0%	38.0%
- County results Linder: 50–60% 70–80% 80–90% Heckman: 50–60%
U.S. Representative before election
John Linder
Republican
Elected U.S. Representative
John Linder
Republican

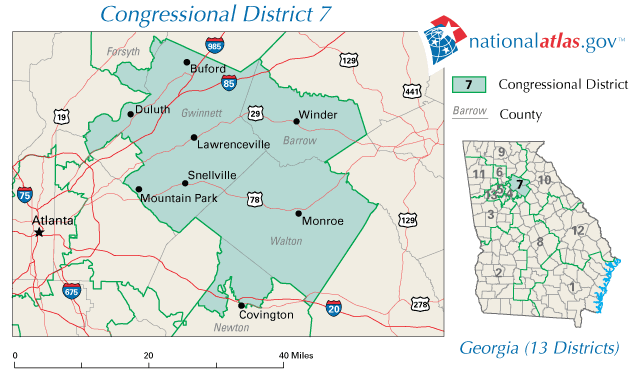

Republican incumbent John Linder (campaign website) won against Democratic nominee Doug Heckman (campaign website), a veteran of the wars in Afghanistan and Iraq. CQ Politics forecasted the race as 'Safe Republican'.

- Race ranking and details from CQ Politics
- Campaign contributions from OpenSecrets

=== Predictions ===
Source	Ranking	As of
The Cook Political Report	Safe R	November 6, 2008
Rothenberg	Safe R	November 2, 2008
Sabato's Crystal Ball	Safe R	November 6, 2008
Real Clear Politics	Safe R	November 7, 2008
CQ Politics	Safe R	November 6, 2008

Georgia's 7th congressional district election, 2008
Party	Candidate	Votes	%
Republican	John Linder (incumbent)	209,354	62.0
Democratic	Doug Heckman	128,159	38.0
Total votes		337,513	100.00
Republican hold			

== District 8 ==
2008 Georgia's 8th congressional district election
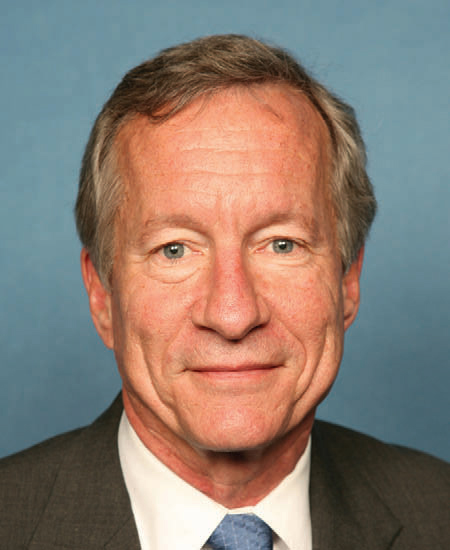

Nominee	Jim Marshall	Rick Goddard
Party	Democratic	Republican
Popular vote	157,241	117,446
Percentage	57.2%	42.8%
- County results Marshall: 50–60% 60–70% 70–80% Goddard: 50–60% 60–70%
U.S. Representative before election
Jim Marshall
Democratic
Elected U.S. Representative
Jim Marshall
Democratic

Democratic incumbent Jim Marshall (campaign website) won against Republican nominee and retired Major General Rick Goddard (campaign website).

Marshall survived a challenge from former Republican congressman Mac Collins in 2006 by 1,752 votes and was expected to face a tough re-election bid in 2008. Some thought this might prompt him to challenge U.S. Senator Saxby Chambliss in Georgia's Senate race, but he decided to stay in the House. Marshall won easily in the primary against music teacher Robert Nowak (campaign website).

On the Republican side, retired Air Force Major General Rick Goddard announced that he would run. His background may have great appeal in a district with a large number of veterans, though Marshall's own military background and well-established credibility on military issues may cancel this out. Other potential Republican candidates were state Senator Ross Tolleson, state Senator Cecil Staton and former congressman Mac Collins, but Goddard ran unopposed. The present district, which was implemented starting with the 2006 election, would have given George W. Bush 61% of the vote in 2004 (CPVI=R+8).

- Race ranking and details from CQ Politics
- Campaign contributions from OpenSecrets

=== Predictions ===
Source	Ranking	As of
The Cook Political Report	Lean D	November 6, 2008
Rothenberg	Tilt D	November 2, 2008
Sabato's Crystal Ball	Lean D	November 6, 2008
Real Clear Politics	Lean D	November 7, 2008
CQ Politics	Lean D	November 6, 2008

Georgia's 8th congressional district election, 2008
Party	Candidate	Votes	%
Democratic	Jim Marshall (incumbent)	157,241	57.2
Republican	Rick Goddard	117,446	42.8
Total votes		274,687	100.00
Democratic hold			

== District 9 ==
2008 Georgia's 9th congressional district election
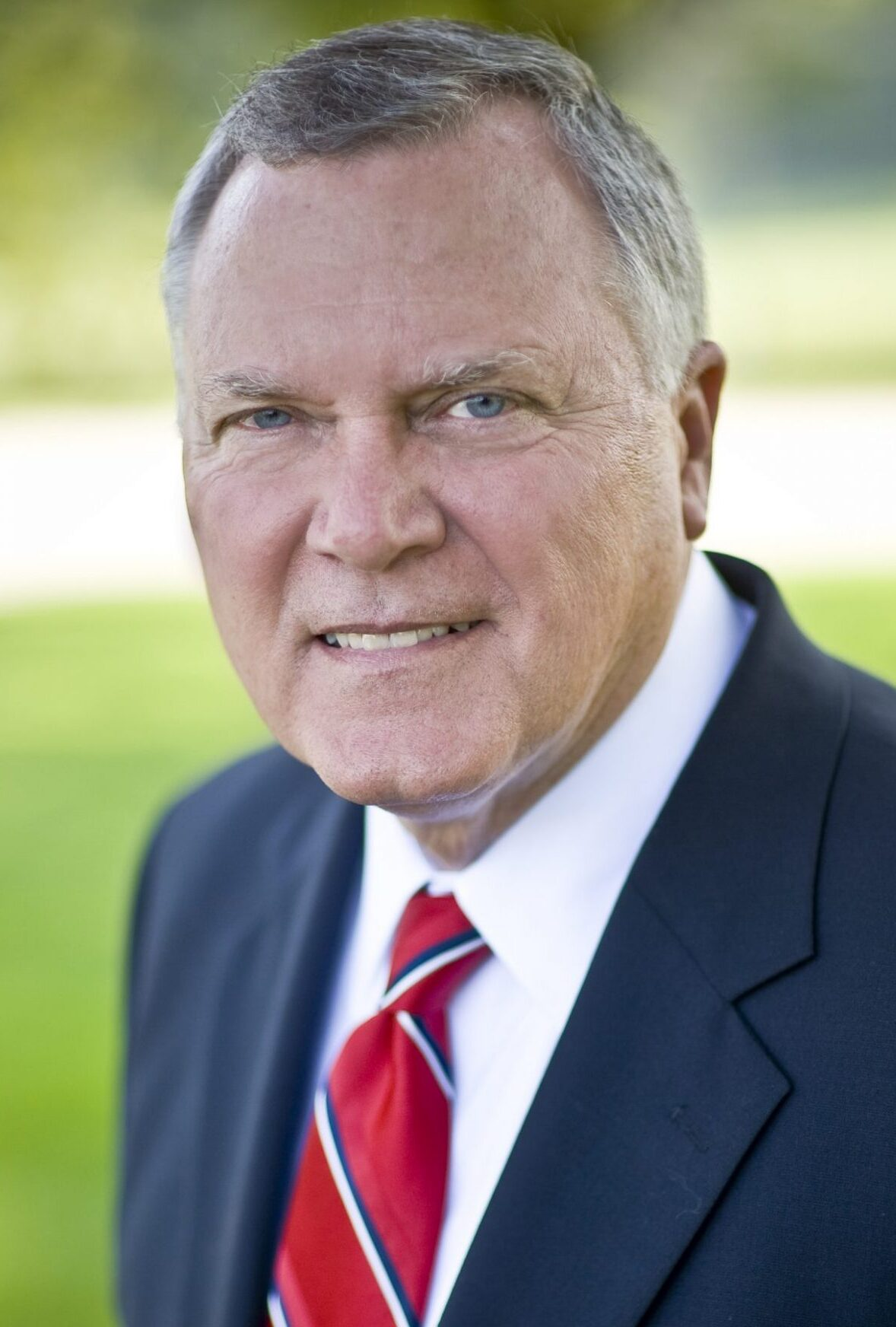

Nominee	Nathan Deal	Jeff Scott
Party	Republican	Democratic
Popular vote	217,493	70,537
Percentage	75.5%	24.5%
- County results Deal: 60–70% 70–80% 80–90%
U.S. Representative before election
Nathan Deal
Republican
Elected U.S. Representative
Nathan Deal
Republican

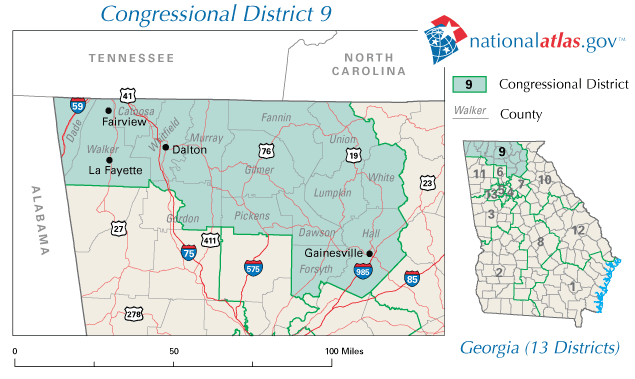

Republican incumbent Nathan Deal won against Democratic nominee Jeff Scott (campaign website). CQ Politics forecasted the race as 'Safe Republican'.

- Race ranking and details from CQ Politics
- Campaign contributions from OpenSecrets

=== Predictions ===
Source	Ranking	As of
The Cook Political Report	Safe R	November 6, 2008
Rothenberg	Safe R	November 2, 2008
Sabato's Crystal Ball	Safe R	November 6, 2008
Real Clear Politics	Safe R	November 7, 2008
CQ Politics	Safe R	November 6, 2008

Georgia's 9th congressional district election, 2008
Party	Candidate	Votes	%
Republican	Nathan Deal (incumbent)	217,493	75.5
Democratic	Jeff Scott	70,537	24.5
Total votes		288,030	100.00
Republican hold			

== District 10 ==
2008 Georgia's 10th congressional district election
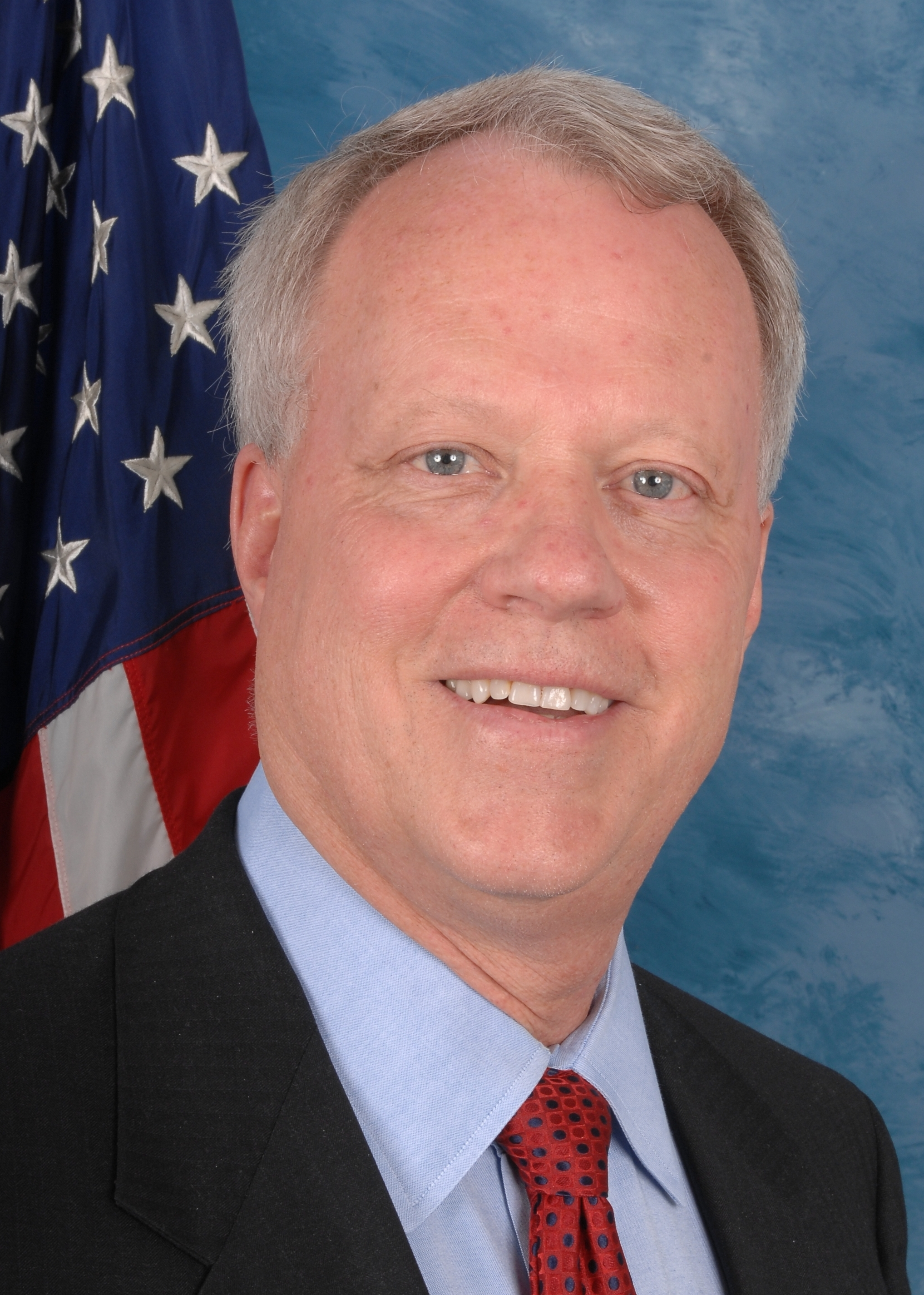

Nominee	Paul Broun	Bobby Saxon
Party	Republican	Democratic
Popular vote	177,265	114,638
Percentage	60.7%	39.3%
- County results Broun: 50–60% 60–70% 70–80% Saxon: 50–60% 60–70%
U.S. Representative before election
Paul Broun
Republican
Elected U.S. Representative
Paul Broun
Republican

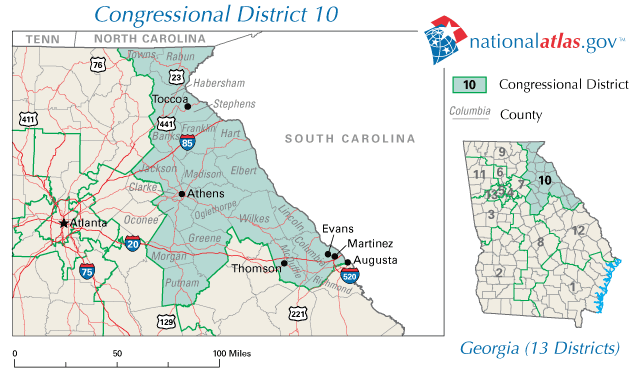

Republican incumbent Paul Broun (campaign website) won against Democratic nominee and Iraq War veteran Bobby Saxon (campaign website). CQ Politics forecasted the race as 'Safe Republican'.

In a 2007 special election, physician Paul Broun, a Republican with libertarian views, won a stunning upset in a non-partisan runoff. On July 15, Broun fended off his Republican primary challenger and state Representative Barry Fleming 71.0% to 29.0%.

- Race ranking and details from CQ Politics
- Campaign contributions from OpenSecrets

=== Predictions ===
Source	Ranking	As of
The Cook Political Report	Safe R	November 6, 2008
Rothenberg	Safe R	November 2, 2008
Sabato's Crystal Ball	Safe R	November 6, 2008
Real Clear Politics	Safe R	November 7, 2008
CQ Politics	Safe R	November 6, 2008

Georgia's 10th congressional district election, 2008
Party	Candidate	Votes	%
Republican	Paul Broun (incumbent)	177,265	60.7
Democratic	Bobby Saxon	114,638	39.3
Total votes		291,903	100.00
Republican hold			

== District 11 ==
2008 Georgia's 11th congressional district election
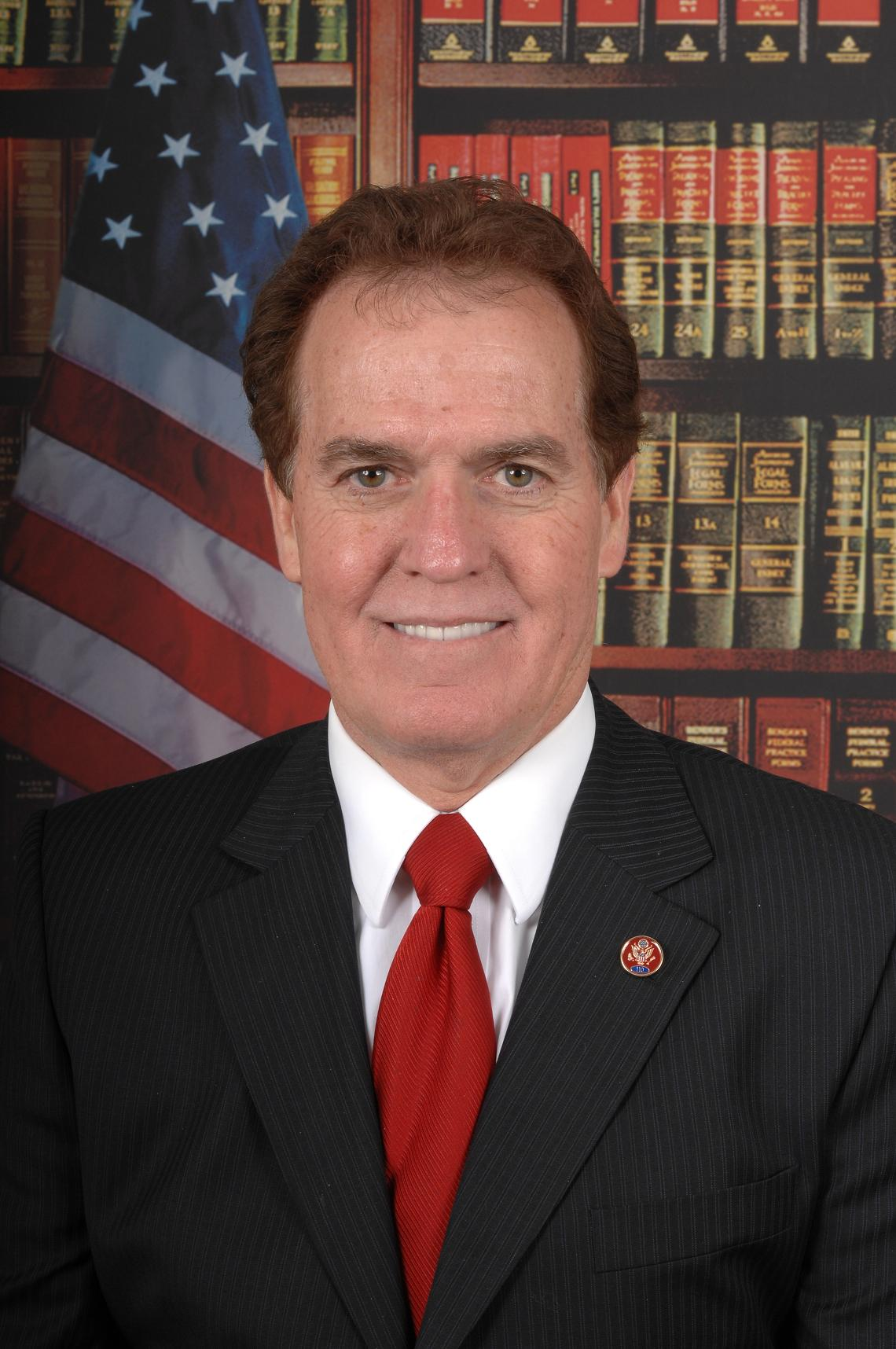

Nominee	Phil Gingrey	Bud Gammon
Party	Republican	Democratic
Popular vote	204,082	95,220
Percentage	68.2%	31.8%
- County results Gingrey: 60–70% 70–80%
U.S. Representative before election
Phil Gingrey
Republican
Elected U.S. Representative
Phil Gingrey
Republican

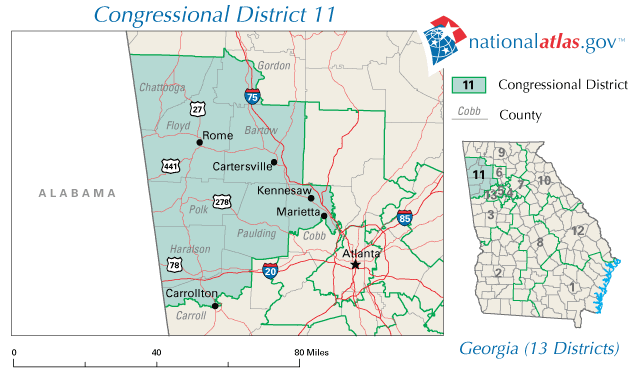

Republican incumbent Phil Gingrey (campaign website) won against Democratic nominee Bud Gammon (campaign website). CQ Politics forecasted the race as 'Safe Republican'.

- Race ranking and details from CQ Politics
- Campaign contributions from OpenSecrets

=== Predictions ===
Source	Ranking	As of
The Cook Political Report	Safe R	November 6, 2008
Rothenberg	Safe R	November 2, 2008
Sabato's Crystal Ball	Safe R	November 6, 2008
Real Clear Politics	Safe R	November 7, 2008
CQ Politics	Safe R	November 6, 2008

Georgia's 11th congressional district election, 2008
Party	Candidate	Votes	%
Republican	Phil Gingrey (incumbent)	204,082	68.2
Democratic	Bud Gammon	95,220	31.8
Total votes		299,302	100.00
Republican hold			

== District 12 ==
2008 Georgia's 12th congressional district election
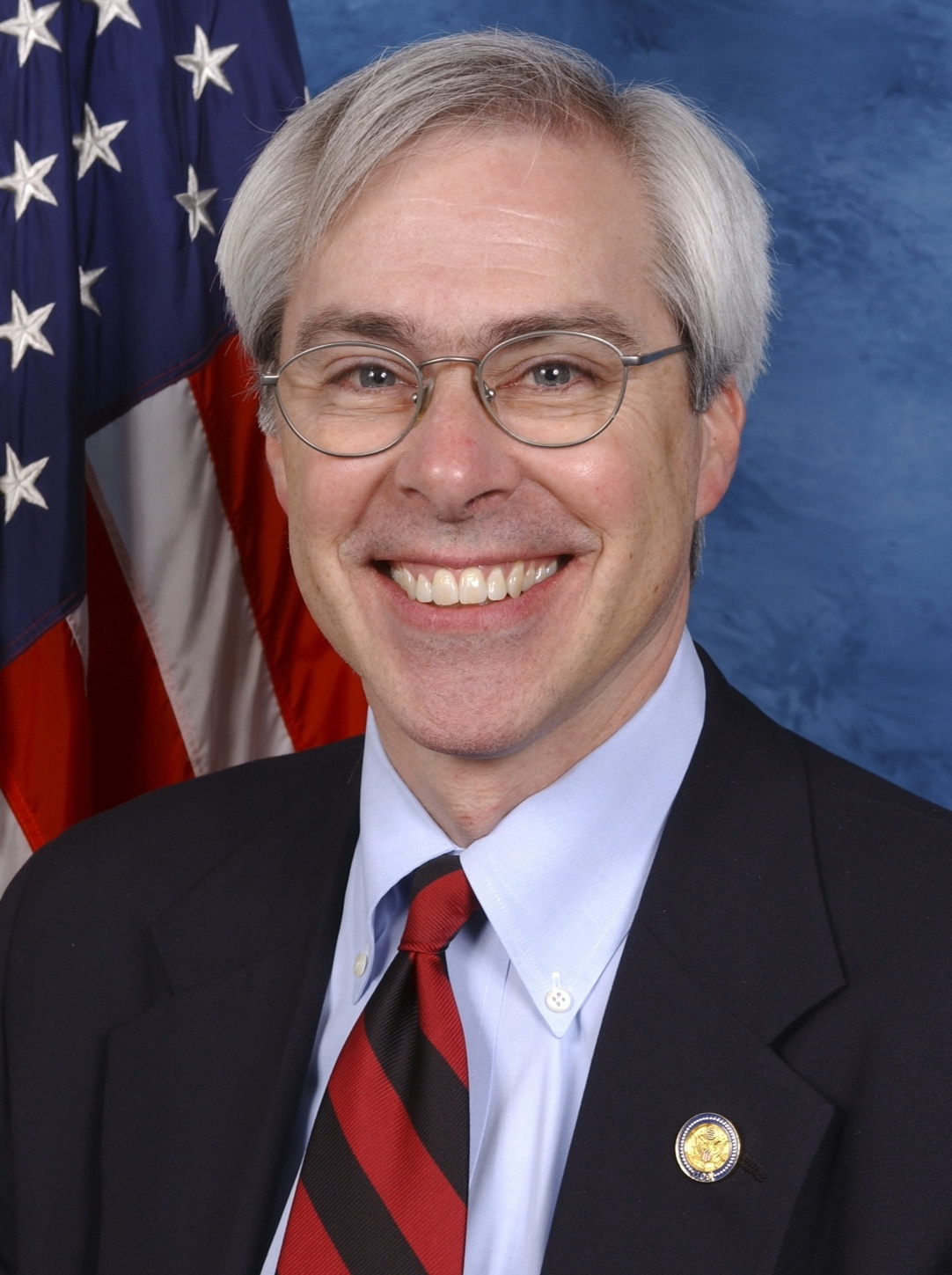

Nominee	John Barrow	John Stone
Party	Democratic	Republican
Popular vote	164,562	84,773
Percentage	66.0%	34.0%
- County results Barrow: 50–60% 60–70% 70–80% 80–90% Stone: 50–60%
U.S. Representative before election
John Barrow
Democratic
Elected U.S. Representative
John Barrow
Democratic

=== Democratic primary ===
==== Candidates ====
===== Nominee =====
- John Barrow, incumbent U.S. representative

===== Eliminated in primary =====
- Regina Thomas, state senator

==== Endorsements ====
John Barrow

U.S. senators

- Barack Obama, U.S. senator from Illinois

Organizations

- BIPAC

==== Results ====
Democratic primary results
Party	Candidate	Votes	%
Democratic	John Barrow (incumbent)	45,235	76.4
Democratic	Regina Thomas	13,955	23.6
Total votes		59,190	

=== General election ===
==== Endorsements ====
John Barrow

Organizations

- United States Chamber of Commerce

==== Predictions ====
Source	Ranking	As of
The Cook Political Report	Safe D	November 6, 2008
Rothenberg	Safe D	November 2, 2008
Sabato's Crystal Ball	Lean D	November 6, 2008
Real Clear Politics	Safe D	November 7, 2008
CQ Politics	Likely D	November 6, 2008

Georgia's 12th congressional district election, 2008
Party	Candidate	Votes	%
Democratic	John Barrow (incumbent)	164,562	66.0
Republican	John Stone	84,773	34.0
Total votes		249,335	100.00
Democratic hold			

== District 13 ==
2008 Georgia's 13th congressional district election
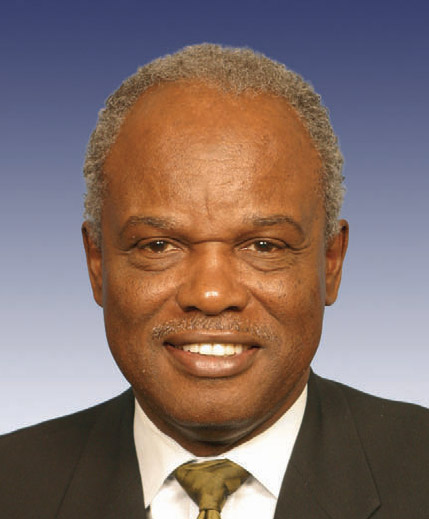

Nominee	David Scott	Deborah Honeycutt
Party	Democratic	Republican
Popular vote	205,919	92,320
Percentage	69.0%	31.0%
- County results Scott: 50–60% 70–80% 80–90% 90–100%
U.S. Representative before election
David Scott
Democratic
Elected U.S. Representative
David Scott
Democratic

=== Democratic primary ===
==== Candidates ====
===== Nominee =====
- David Scott, incumbent U.S. representative

===== Eliminated in primary =====
- Donzella James, former state senator

==== Results ====
Democratic primary results
Party	Candidate	Votes	%
Democratic	David Scott (incumbent)	30,719	63.7
Democratic	Donzella James	17,526	36.3
Total votes		48,245	

=== Republican primary ===
==== Nominee ====
- Deborah Honeycutt, physician

==== Results ====
Republican primary results
Party	Candidate	Votes	%
Republican	Deborah Honeycutt	11,478	100.0
Total votes		11,478	

=== General election ===
==== Predictions ====
Source	Ranking	As of
The Cook Political Report	Safe D	November 6, 2008
Rothenberg	Safe D	November 2, 2008
Sabato's Crystal Ball	Safe D	November 6, 2008
Real Clear Politics	Safe D	November 7, 2008
CQ Politics	Likely D	November 6, 2008

==== Results ====
Georgia's 13th congressional district election, 2008
Party	Candidate	Votes	%
Democratic	David Scott (incumbent)	205,919	69.0
Republican	Deborah Honeycutt	92,320	31.0
Total votes		298,239	
Democratic hold			

== See also ==
- 2008 United States House of Representatives elections

Preceded by 2006 elections	United States House elections in Georgia; 2008	Succeeded by 2010 elections
