= Federal Reserve Transparency Act of 2013 =

- Long title: To require a full audit of the Board of Governors of the Federal Reserve System and the Federal reserve banks by the Comptroller General of the United States, and for other purposes.
- Announced in: the 113th United States Congress
- Sponsored by: Rep. Paul C. Broun (R, GA-10)
- Number of co-sponsors: 0

Codification
- U.S.C. sections affected: 31 U.S.C. § 714
- Agencies affected: Government Accountability Office, United States House of Representatives, United States Congress, United States Senate, Federal Reserve Board of Governors

Legislative history
- Introduced in the House as H.R. 24 by Rep. Paul C. Broun (R, GA-10) on January 3, 2013; Committee consideration by United States House Committee on Oversight and Government Reform, United States House Committee on Financial Services; Passed the House on September 17, 2014 (Roll Call Vote 504: 333-92)

The Federal Reserve Transparency Act of 2013 (H.R. 24) is a bill that would direct the Government Accountability Office (GAO) to prepare, within 12 months of enactment, an audit of the Board of Governors of the Federal Reserve System and the Federal Reserve Banks.

The bill was introduced into the United States House of Representatives during the 113th United States Congress.

== Background ==
The Federal Reserve System (also known as the Federal Reserve, and informally as the Fed) is the central banking system of the United States. It was created on December 23, 1913, with the enactment of the Federal Reserve Act, largely in response to a series of financial panics, particularly a severe panic in 1907. Over time, the roles and responsibilities of the Federal Reserve System have expanded, and its structure has evolved. Events such as the Great Depression in the 1930s were major factors leading to changes in the system.

The U.S. Congress established three key objectives for monetary policy in the Federal Reserve Act: Maximum employment, stable prices, and moderate long-term interest rates. The first two objectives are sometimes referred to as the Federal Reserve's dual mandate. Its duties have expanded over the years, and today, according to official Federal Reserve documentation, include conducting the nation's monetary policy, supervising and regulating banking institutions, maintaining the stability of the financial system and providing financial services to depository institutions, the U.S. government, and foreign official institutions. The Fed also conducts research into the economy and releases numerous publications, such as the Beige Book.

The Federal Reserve System has faced various criticisms since its inception in 1913. These criticisms include the assertions that the Federal Reserve System violates the United States Constitution and that it impedes economic prosperity. Critic Miranda Fleschert contends that the twelve regional Federal Reserve banks (as opposed to the entire Federal Reserve System) consider themselves to be private corporations with private funding. The movement to audit the Federal Reserve System has gained national traction; a bill related to the movement was passed through the House of Representatives in 2012. Many critics see auditing the Federal Reserve System as a means of gaining insight into an institution they contend has historically had little to no transparency, that has acted without congressional approval or oversight, and that has the power to create and loan U.S. dollars based on a monetary policy determined by its own interests.

== Provisions of the bill ==
This summary is based largely on the summary provided by the Congressional Research Service, a public domain source.

The Federal Reserve Transparency Act of 2013 would direct the Comptroller General (GAO) to: (1) complete, within 12 months of enactment of this Act, the required audit of the Board of Governors of the Federal Reserve System (Board) and of the Federal Reserve Banks; and (2) submit to Congress, within 90 days of audit completion, a detailed report of audit findings and conclusions.

The bill would repeal certain limitations placed upon such audit.

The bill would instruct the Comptroller General to audit and report on the review of loan files of homeowners in foreclosure in 2009 or 2010, required as part of the enforcement actions taken by the Board against supervised financial institutions. Prescribes audit contents, including: (1) the guidance given by the Board to independent consultants retained by the supervised financial institutions regarding procedures to be followed in conducting the file reviews, (2) the factors considered by independent consultants when evaluating loan files and the results obtained pursuant to those reviews, and (3) the determinations made by such consultants regarding the nature and extent of financial injury sustained by each homeowner as well as the level and type of remediation offered.

== Congressional Budget Office report ==
This summary is based largely on the summary provided by the Congressional Budget Office, as ordered reported by the House Committee on Oversight and Government Reform on July 24, 2014. This is a public domain source.

H.R. 24 would amend federal law regarding audits of the Federal Reserve System. Specifically, the bill would direct the Government Accountability Office (GAO) to prepare, within 12 months of enactment, an audit of the Board of Governors of the Federal Reserve System and the Federal Reserve banks. The bill would also repeal prohibitions under current law that prevent GAO from auditing the Federal Reserve’s monetary policy and any of the Federal Reserve’s transactions involving a foreign central bank, the government of a foreign country, or a nonprivate international financing organization. The Congressional Budget Office (CBO) expects that the removal of those prohibitions would result in future requests from Members of Congress for GAO to conduct additional oversight and analysis of the Federal Reserve System on a periodic basis.

Based on information from GAO regarding the amount of effort required for its previous audit of the Federal Reserve, which was required by the Dodd-Frank Wall Street Reform and Consumer Protection Act (Pub. L. 111–203 (text) (PDF)), CBO estimates that implementing H.R. 24 would increase discretionary spending by $5 million over the 2015-2019 period, assuming appropriation of the necessary amounts. That cost would cover the full-time and part-time GAO employees plus administrative expenses necessary to prepare the audit required by the bill as well as future oversight and analysis that CBO expects would result from the enactment of the bill.

In addition, based on information provided by the Federal Reserve and on information provided by GAO regarding the likely costs of similar proposals regarding oversight of the Federal Reserve, CBO estimates that enacting H.R. 24 would increase costs of the Federal Reserve and thus decrease federal revenues by less than $500,000 in each year of the 2015-2024 period, and by $3 million in total over that period. That estimate of revenue reductions reflects higher costs of the Federal Reserve System associated with coordination of the initial audit and future GAO oversight and analysis. Because enacting H.R. 24 would affect revenues, pay-as-you-go procedures apply. CBO estimates that enacting H.R. 24 would not affect direct spending.

H.R. 24 contains no intergovernmental or private-sector mandates as defined in the Unfunded Mandates Reform Act and would not affect the budgets of state, local, or tribal governments.

== Procedural history ==
The Federal Reserve Transparency Act of 2013 was introduced into the United States House of Representatives on January 3, 2013 by Rep. Paul C. Broun (R, GA-10). The bill was referred to the United States House Committee on Oversight and Government Reform and the United States House Committee on Financial Services. The House voted on September 17, 2014 in Roll Call Vote 504 to pass the bill in a vote of 333-92.

== Debate and discussion ==
Rep. Broun, who introduced the bill, said that "this is a vital piece of legislation that will help to usher in a new era of transparency in this nation's monetary policy." Broun argued that because Congress created the Federal Reserve, "it must therefore be subject to the oversight and regulation of Congress."

Rep. Thomas Massie (R-KY) supported the bill, arguing that "since its inception, the Federal Reserve has always operated in the shadows, without sufficient scrutiny or oversight of its operations."

Rep. Elijah Cummings (D-MD) opposed the bill, arguing that "if enacted, this bill would severely curtail the independence that has been a hallmark for the Federal Reserve and has been essential to its ability to strengthen our country."

Federal Reserve Chairwoman Janet Yellen was opposed to the bill, arguing that the bill would be "interfering with the independence of monetary policy."

== See also ==
- List of bills in the 113th United States Congress
