= Bill Jackson (politician) =

American politician (born 1932)

Member of the Georgia Senate from the 24th district
- In office July 6, 2007 – January 9, 2017
- Preceded by: Jim Whitehead
- Succeeded by: Lee Anderson

Member of the Georgia House of Representatives from the 112th district
- In office 1979–1984
- In office 1987–1990
- In office 1997–2002

Personal details
- Born: December 30, 1932 (age 93) Asheville, North Carolina, U.S.
- Party: Republican

William S. Jackson (born December 30, 1932) is an American politician. He was a member of the Georgia State Senate from the 24th District, having served from 2007 to 2017. Jackson is a member of the Republican party. He also served in the Georgia House of Representatives from 1979 to 1984, 1987 to 1990 and 1997 to 2002.
