= Jim Whitehead (politician) =

American politician

James Whitehead (born 1942 in Augusta, Georgia) is a former Republican member of the Georgia State Senate. He was narrowly defeated in a June 2007 runoff election for the United States House of Representatives in Georgia's 10th congressional district's special election called to replace the late Representative Charlie Norwood.

== Personal life ==
Whitehead attended Richmond County public schools, and graduated from the Academy of Richmond County in 1960. As a standout athlete, he earned All-American honors as a football tackle. He also set the Academy track team record for the shot put.

Whitehead continued his athletic career as a Bulldog at the University of Georgia in Athens from 1960 to 1962 in football and track. He played as an offensive and defensive tackle with quarterback Fran Tarkenton and set a UGA shot put record which stood for six years.

Whitehead founded Jim Whitehead Tire Company in 1985, which has two locations in the Greater Augusta area. He is also President of Southeast Tire Group, Inc., a buying service for independent tire dealers.

In 1964, Whitehead married the former Peggy Ann Bond of DeKalb County. The couple lives in Evans. They have two sons and a daughter, all of whom are married.

== Political career ==
In 1994, Whitehead was elected to the Columbia County Commission, where he served until 2002, including a term as chairman. He was first elected to the Georgia Senate in 2004, and was re-elected in 2006. He currently serves as Chairman of the Georgia Board of Corrections, Chairman of the Senate Committee on Public Safety and Homeland Security, Vice Chairman of the Transportation Committee, a member of the Economic Development and Natural Resources Committees, and Deputy Whip for Senate Republicans.

Whitehead is a member of the board of directors of Doctors Hospital in Augusta, and an advisory board member of First Bank of Augusta. He has served as the chairman of the Augusta Red Cross, board member of the Georgia Tire Dealers Association, member of the Association of County Commissioners of Georgia, member of the Augusta Convention and Visitors Bureau, and a member of the Pastor-Parrish Relations Committee of Wesley United Methodist Church in Evans.

== U.S. Congress special election ==
In February 2007, Republican U.S. Congressman Charlie Norwood, of Georgia's 10th congressional district, died of cancer. There was a special election open primary in June 2007, where candidates of all parties participated in the primary. A candidate needed 50% to win outright, and there would be a run-off if no candidate earned it the first time. Ten candidates filed: six Republicans, three Democrats, and a Libertarian. Whitehead was the only elected politician to run, and was the front-runner. He won the endorsements of U.S. Congressman Saxby Chambliss.

In the primary, Whitehead finished first with 44% of the vote. Doctor Paul Broun qualified for the run-off, ranking second with 21% of the vote, with only 198 votes more than third-place finisher James Marlow, a Democrat. Broun won a plurality of just four counties: Oconee (47%), Jackson (42%), Oglethorpe (37%), and Morgan (31%).

In the runoff campaign, Whitehead angered some voters by failing to appear at a debate held in Athens and then by referring to his alma mater, the University of Georgia, as a "liberal bastion" that should be eliminated, save for the football team. In the July 17, 2007 election, Broun upset Whitehead by a margin of just 0.8%, a difference of just 394 votes. After the votes were certified, Whitehead declined to ask for a recount despite the narrow margin. Broun won the counties in the Northern part of the district, while Whitehead won the counties in the southern part. Broun's best two performing counties were Clarke (90%) and Oconee (88%).

Georgia State Senate
Preceded by Joey Brush	Member of the Georgia State Senate from the 24th district 2005–2007	Succeeded by Bill Jackson
