= 2007 Georgia's 10th congressional district special election =

- June 19, 2007
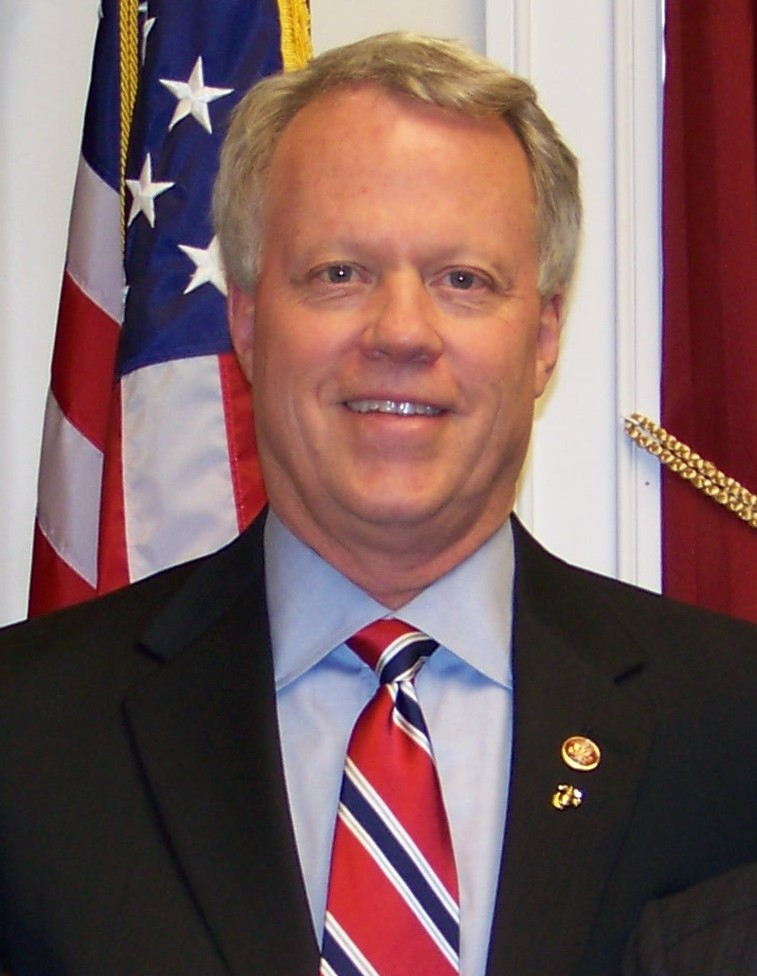

Nominee	Paul Broun	Jim Whitehead
Party	Republican	Republican
Popular vote	23,529	23,135
Percentage	50.4%	49.6%
- Runoff county results Broun: 50–60% 60–70% 70–80% 80–90% Whitehead: 50–60% 60–70% 70–80%
U.S. Representative before election
Charlie Norwood
Republican
Elected U.S. Representative
Paul Broun
Republican

On June 19, 2007, the U.S. state of Georgia held a special election to fill a vacancy in Georgia's 10th congressional district. A runoff was held on July 17 with Paul Broun defeating Jim Whitehead by less than 1%.

== History ==
The vacancy was created by the death of incumbent Republican Charlie Norwood. Norwood won reelection in 2006 with 67% of the vote.

Since this is a nonpartisan special election, all candidates for the election were listed alphabetically, though their party affiliations are noted on the ballot. According to Georgia law, to win outright, a candidate needed a majority vote; since no candidate won more than 50% of the vote, the top two finishers competed in a runoff election on July 17, 2007.

== Candidates ==
The following candidates were on the June 19 ballot. They are listed here alphabetically: first by party, then by name.

=== Democratic ===
- Denise Freeman – Baptist minister and 1998/2000 Democratic nominee
- James Marlow – Yahoo! Marketing executive
- Evita Paschall – Attorney

=== Libertarian ===
- Jim Sendelbach – Psychotherapist

=== Republican ===
- Paul Broun – Physician, nominee for GA-03 in 1990, candidate in 1992, and candidate for U.S. Senate in 1996
- William L. Greene – Conservative activist, American political science professor, and faithless elector (2016)
- Mark Myers – Realtor & previous candidate
- Nate Pulliam – Former soldier in the US Army & Realtor
- Erik Underwood – Former Congressional Aide & Political consultant
- Jim Whitehead – St. Senator, 2005–2007

== Results ==
No candidate received a majority in the June 19 election so a runoff between Republicans Jim Whitehead and Paul Broun was held on July 17. Democrat James Marlow, the third-place finisher, had the right to request a recount within 48 hours of the official certification of the election results on June 25, 2007, due to the very small difference in total votes for himself and Broun, but did not do so.

The official returns for the June 19 election and the July 17 run-off are:

Candidate	Party	General election		Run-off	
Candidate	Party	Votes	%	Votes	%
Jim Whitehead	Republican	23,555	43.51	23,135	49.58
Paul Broun	Republican	11,208	20.70	23,529	50.42
James Marlow	Democratic	11,010	20.34		
Denise Freeman	Democratic	2,574	4.76		
Evita Paschall	Democratic	1,778	3.28		
Bill Greene	Republican	1,635	3.02		
Nate Pulliam	Republican	913	1.69		
Jim Sendelbach	Libertarian	710	1.31		
Mark Myers	Republican	378	0.70		
Erik Underwood	Republican	376	0.70		

== See also ==
- List of special elections to the United States House of Representatives
