= Paul Broun =

American physician & politician (born 1946)

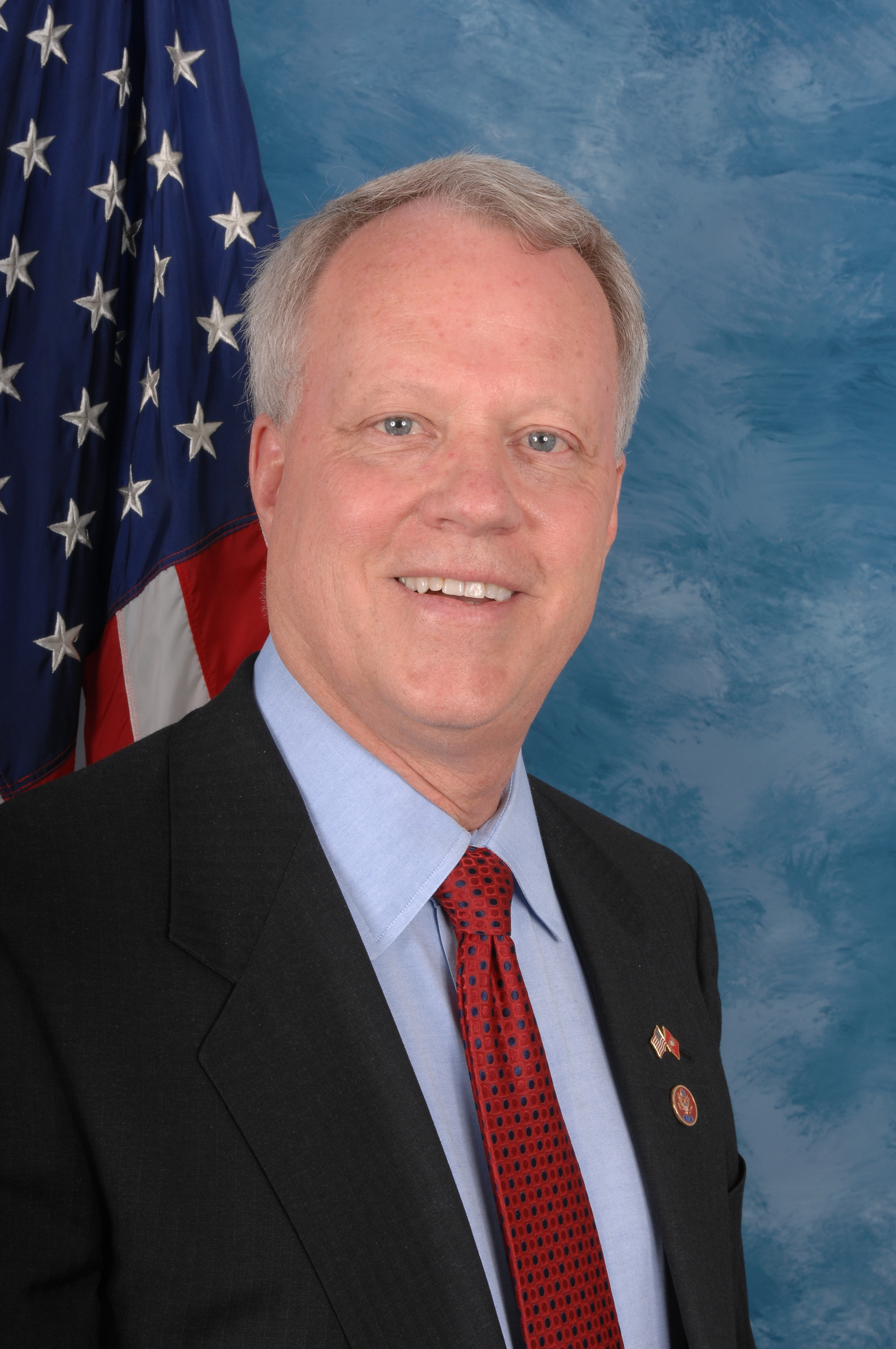
- Official portrait, 2007

Member of the U.S. House of Representatives from Georgia's 10th district
- In office July 17, 2007 – January 3, 2015 (Note: Broun's official service begins on the date of the special election, while he was not sworn in until July 25, 2007.)
- Preceded by: Charlie Norwood
- Succeeded by: Jody Hice

Personal details
- Born: Paul Collins Broun Jr. May 14, 1946 (age 80) Atlanta, Georgia, U.S.
- Party: Republican
- Spouse: Niki
- Children: 3
- Parent: Paul C. Broun Sr. (father)
- Education: University of Georgia (BS); Augusta University (MD)

Paul Collins Broun Jr. (born May 14, 1946) is an American physician and politician who served as the U.S. representative for Georgia's 10th congressional district from 2007 to 2015. He is a member of the Republican Party and was a member of the Tea Party Caucus.

Broun unsuccessfully sought the Republican nomination for the U.S. Senate seat vacated by Saxby Chambliss in the 2014 election. In 2020, he unsuccessfully sought the Republican nomination to represent Georgia's 9th congressional district – a seat he contested once before in 2016 – coming in fourth.

== Early life and education ==
Broun was born in Atlanta, Georgia, the son of Gertrude Margaret (née Beasley) and Democratic Georgia state senator Paul C. Broun (1916–2005), who represented Athens and the surrounding area from 1963 to 2001. His paternal grandfather was a minister. Broun is a graduate of Clarke Central High School and the University of Georgia at Athens (B.S., Chemistry, 1967) and earned his Doctor of Medicine (1971) from the Medical College of Georgia in Augusta.

== Career ==
Broun completed his medical internship at Good Samaritan Hospital in Portland, Oregon and residency at UAB Hospital in Birmingham, Alabama. He then practiced general medicine; starting in 2002 he maintained a practice based solely on house calls.

Broun had been raised as a conservative Democrat like his father, but became a Republican sometime in the 1980s.

He first ran for public office in 1990, challenging Democratic U.S. Congressman Richard Ray, of Georgia's 3rd congressional district. Ray defeated him 63%–37%.

Broun ran again in 1992, but lost in the Republican primary to State Senator Mac Collins, 55%–45%. Broun won five of the district's seventeen counties. Collins went on to defeat Ray, 55%–44%.

In 1996, Democratic US Senator Sam Nunn decided to retired. Broun was one of six Republicans who ran for the Republican nomination in the race. Broun finished fourth, with 3% of the vote. Guy Millner, a businessman, finished first with 42% of the vote. He won the run-off election against state representative Johnny Isakson, who had received 35% of the vote in the primary, then lost the general election to Democrat Max Cleland by one percentage point.

== U.S. House of Representatives ==
=== Elections ===
==== 2007 ====
In February 2007, Republican U.S. Congressman Charlie Norwood, of Georgia's 10th congressional district, died of cancer. Broun had announced his candidacy before Norwood's death. There was a special election open primary in June 2007, where candidates of all parties participated in the primary. A candidate needed 50% to win outright, and there would be a run-off if no candidate earned it the first time. Ten candidates filed: six Republicans, three Democrats, and a Libertarian. State Senator Jim Whitehead was the only candidate with electoral experience, and was considered the frontrunner. He was endorsed by U.S. Senator Saxby Chambliss.

In the primary, Whitehead finished first with 44% of the vote. Broun qualified for the run-off, ranking second with 21% of the vote, with only 198 votes more than third-place finisher James Marlow, a Democrat. Broun won a plurality of just four counties: Oconee (47%), Jackson (42%), Oglethorpe (37%), and Morgan (31%).

In the runoff campaign, Whitehead angered some voters by failing to appear at a debate held in Athens and then by referring to his alma mater, the University of Georgia, as a "liberal bastion" that should be eliminated, save for the football team. In the July 17, 2007 election, Broun upset Whitehead by a margin of just 0.8%, a difference of just 394 votes. After the votes were certified, Whitehead declined to ask for a recount despite the narrow margin. Broun won the counties in the Northern part of the district, while Whitehead won the counties in the southern part. Broun's best two performing counties were Clarke (90%) and Oconee (88%).

==== 2008 ====
Broun was challenged by Republican state representative and House Majority Leader Barry Fleming, who had endorsed Whitehead in the 2007 election. Broun defeated Fleming in the July 2008 primary, 71%–29%. He won every county in the district. However, his weakest performance was in the Southeastern part. He won counties like Richmond with just 52% and Columbia with just 58%. He won the general election with 61% to 39% against Democrat Bobby Saxon.

==== 2010 ====
Broun won re-election to a second full term, defeating Democrat Russell Edwards, 67%–33%.

==== 2012 ====
In November 2011, Republican Mac Collins, who had represented much of the middle portion of Broun's redrawn district in Congress a decade earlier, said he was likely to challenge Broun in the 10th District. In May 2012, Collins decided he would not challenge Broun.

In July, Broun won the Republican primary, defeating retired Army officer Stephen Simpson. Broun faced no Democratic candidate in the November general election.

A leaked video of a speech given at Liberty Baptist Church Sportsman's Banquet on September 27, 2012, shows Broun telling supporters that, "All that stuff I was taught about evolution and embryology and the Big Bang Theory, all that is lies straight from the pit of Hell." In addition, Broun is a young earth creationist, and believes that the world is only a few thousand years old, and was created in six literal days. In response to these remarks, coupled with Broun being on the House Science Committee, libertarian radio talk show host Neal Boortz spearheaded a campaign to run the English naturalist and evolutionary theorist Charles Darwin against Broun, with the intention of drawing attention to these comments from the scientific community and having Broun removed from his post on the House Science Committee.

Broun won re-election on November 6, 2012, receiving 209,917 votes across the district. Charles Darwin received about 4000 write-in ballots in Athens-Clarke County as protest votes against Broun's views on evolution, while Broun received 16,980 votes in that county.

==== 2016 ====
In 2016, Broun announced his candidacy for Congress. By this time, he had moved to Gainesville, which is in the Georgia's 9th congressional district. At the time, Cook Political Report rated the 9th as the third most conservative district in the nation. He was running mostly in territory that he did not know and that did not know him, though he represented the district's share of Athens for much of his first stint in Congress.

Broun ran in a five-candidate Republican primary race with fellow Tea Party challengers Roger Fitzpatrick, Bernie Fontaine and Mike Scupin, against incumbent candidate Doug Collins, who held the 9th since 2012. In the May primary, Collins won with 52,943 votes (61.3 percent of the vote), over Broun's 18,761 votes (22 percent), Fitzpatrick's 8,942 votes (10.5 percent), Scupin's 2,854 votes (3.36 percent), and Fontaine's 2,338 votes (2.75 percent).

==== 2020 ====
Broun ran in the primary and was defeated

==== 2022 ====
Broun ran in the primary and was defeated

=== Tenure ===
On July 25, 2007, Broun was sworn in by House Speaker Nancy Pelosi. In January 2013, at the beginning of the 113th Congress, Broun was one of a handful of House Republicans to not vote to reelect John Boehner as Speaker of the United States House of Representatives; Broun instead voted for outspoken former U.S. Representative Allen West of Florida, even though West lost his bid for re-election in November 2012 and was no longer a member of Congress. According to Politico reporter Charlie Mahtesian, Broun has "a flair for the provocative."

Broun is part of the Christian right. In May 2009, Broun proposed a simple resolution that would have proclaimed 2010 "The Year Of The Bible." He also introduced a bill to ban the sale or rental of sexually explicit materials on U.S. military installations. In 2008, 2009, and 2011, Broun was the lead sponsor of the Federal Marriage Amendment, a proposed amendment to the United States Constitution to define marriage as "consisting only of the union of a man and a woman" and thus prohibit same-sex marriage in the United States. Broun also sponsored the proposed Balanced Budget Amendment in various congresses.

Broun received a 96% rating from the National Taxpayers Union.

Broun also voted against the American Recovery and Reinvestment Act of 2009 and decries the high cost of the bill. In 2008, Broun signed Americans for Prosperity's "No Climate Tax" pledge, promising to vote against any Global Warming legislation that would raise taxes.

Broun, in September 2008, voted against the Emergency Economic Stabilization Act of 2008 which created the Troubled Asset Relief Program, or "TARP". Broun voted against the Dodd-Frank Wall Street Reform and Consumer Protection Act of 2009.

Broun strongly opposed the Affordable Care Act ("ACA" or "Obamacare) and supported efforts to repeal and defund the health care reform legislation. Broun supported the October 2013 U.S. federal government shutdown, which was precipitated by a group of Republican members of Congress who sought to dismantle the ACA. In 2009, Broun proposed alternate health care legislation that would involve a 100% tax deduction of healthcare costs, allowing consumers to shop for health insurance across state lines, and the privatization of Medicare.

In 2013, Broun introduced the Federal Reserve Transparency Act of 2013 (the "audit the Fed" legislation), a bill that would direct the GAO to conduct an audit of the Board of Governors of the Federal Reserve System and the Federal Reserve Banks.

Broun has argued for continued U.S. support of Israel on both strategic and theological grounds, saying in 2014, "It's absolutely imperative that we support Israel—our brothers and sisters in the Middle East—not only because of the geopolitical reasons there, which are strong enough in themselves, but because of a promise God made to Abraham."

=== 2020 AR-15 campaign ad video controversy ===
A video released by Broun's campaign in 2020 showed Broun shooting a rifle, offering to give away an AR-15 rifle "to one lucky person who signs up for email updates" from his campaign website, and warning that during the COVID-19 pandemic that Americans might need an AR-15 to shoot "looting hordes from Atlanta." Broun lives in Gainesville, a white majority city about an hour outside the state capital Atlanta, which is a majority African American city. Broun denied that the ad or the reference to "looting hordes from Atlanta" had racial undertones or might concern African-Americans.

=== Committee assignments ===
- Committee on Homeland Security
  - Subcommittee on Border and Maritime Security
  - Subcommittee on Counterterrorism and Intelligence (Vice chair)
- Committee on Science and Technology
  - Subcommittee on Energy and Environment
  - Subcommittee on Investigations and Oversight (Chair)
- Republican Study Committee

=== Caucus memberships ===
- Congressional Constitution Caucus
- Tea Party Caucus

== 2014 U.S. Senate election ==
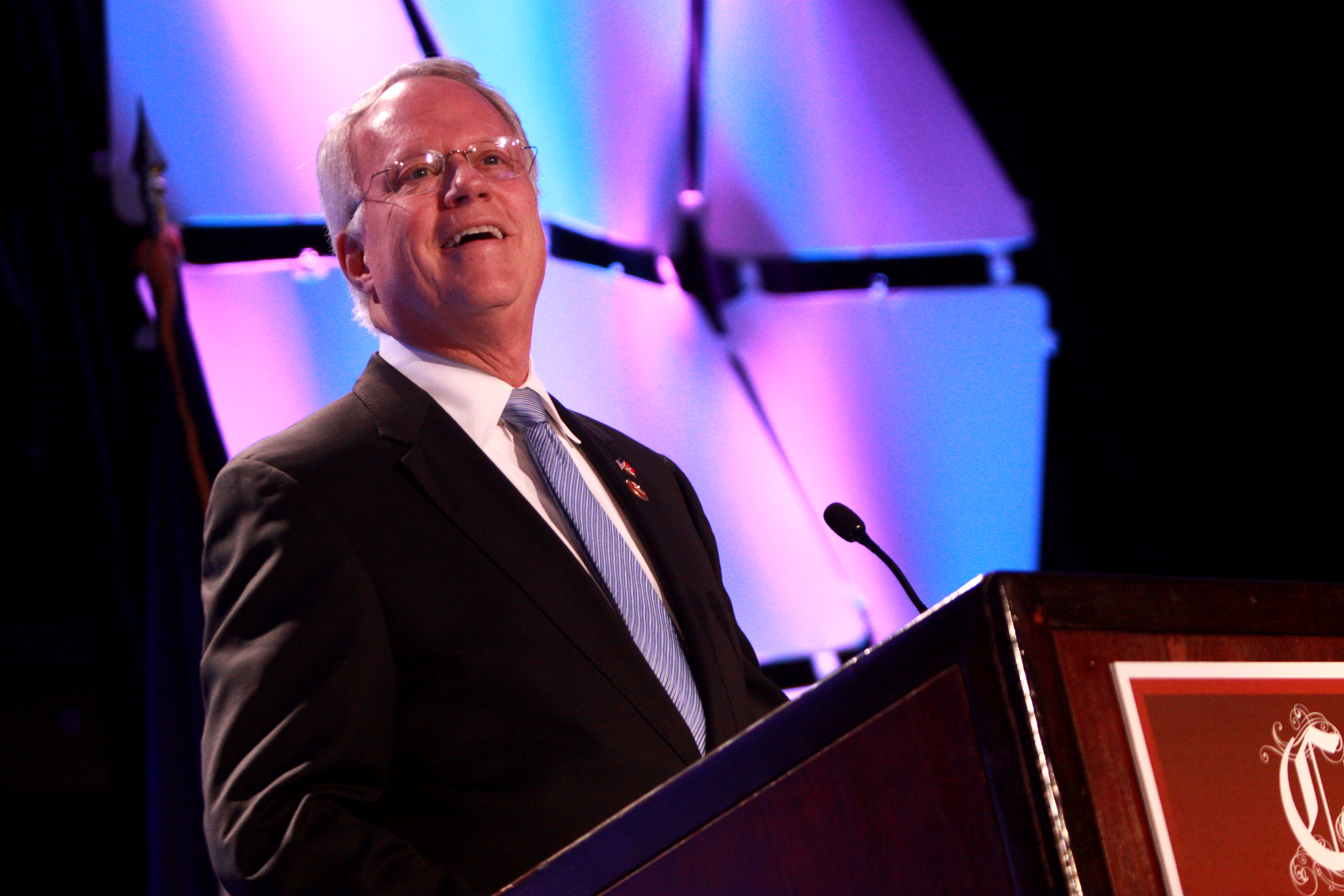
Broun in 2013

In February 2013, Broun officially announced he would leave his house seat to run for the open senate seat vacated by Republican U.S. Senator Saxby Chambliss. Broun finished fifth in the May Republican primary.

== Personal life ==
Broun has three children and two grandchildren.

== See also ==
- Physicians in US Congress

U.S. House of Representatives
Preceded by Charlie Norwood	Member of the U.S. House of Representatives from Georgia's 10th congressional district 2007–2015	Succeeded by Jody Hice
U.S. order of precedence (ceremonial)
Preceded by Jim Marshall as Former U.S. Representative	Order of precedence of the United States as Former U.S. Representative	Succeeded by Jody Hice as Former U.S. Representative
