= Thomas Taggart (disambiguation) =

Thomas Taggart (1856–1929) was an Irish-American politician in Indiana.

Thomas or Tom Taggart may also refer to:

- Thomas Taggart (rugby union) (1866–1945), Irish international rugby union player
- Tom Taggart (Canadian politician), member of the Nova Scotia House of Assembly
- Tom Taggart (Georgia politician) (born 1943), member of the Georgia House of Representatives
