= Bobby Phillips (Georgia politician) =

American politician

Member of the Georgia House of Representatives from the 125th district
- In office January 8, 1979 – January 7, 1985
- Preceded by: Tom Taggart
- Succeeded by: Jack Kingston

Personal details
- Born: Robert P. Phillips III; April 12, 1946 (age 80) Georgia, U.S.
- Party: Democratic
- Education: Mercer University (AB, JD)

Military service
- Branch/service: United States Army
- Years of service: 1970–1974

Robert P. Phillips III (born April 12, 1946) is an American politician. He previously served as a member of the Georgia House of Representatives from the 125th District from 1979 until 1985. In 1978, Phillips defeated incumbent State Representative, Tom Taggart, in the Democratic primary by 11 votes. In 1984, he lost his bid for reelection to Jack Kingston. In 2002, he was a candidate for a state court judgeship.

Phillips is an alumnus of Mercer University, earning his AB in 1968 and JD in 1970. He married Dianna Lynn Dubree and has two children. Phillips served in the United States Army from 1970 until 1974.
