= 2006 United States House of Representatives elections in Georgia =

- November 6, 2006

All 13 Georgia seats to the United States House of Representatives
	Majority party	Minority party
Party	Republican	Democratic
Last election	7	6
Seats won	7	6
Seat change	Steady	Steady
Popular vote	1,138,048	932,143
Percentage	54.97%	45.03%
Swing	▼6.49%	▲6.49%

Republican
50–60%
60–70%
70–80%
80–90%
Democratic
50–60%
60–70%
70–80%
80–90%
>90%

At the time of the election, Georgia had 13 congressional districts whose lines were redrawn in 2005 after Republicans took control of the state legislature and the previous maps were struck down by federal judges. Each district is home to approximately 630,000 Georgia residents. In 2006, seven seats were held by Republicans and six seats were held by Democrats. Results for write in candidates can be found here.

== Overview ==
United States House of Representatives elections in Georgia, 2006
Party	Votes	Percentage	Seats before	Seats after	+/–
Republican	1,138,048	54.97%	7	7	0
Democratic	932,143	45.03%	6	6	0
Others	0	0.0%	0	0	
Valid votes	-	-%			
Invalid or blank votes	-	-%			
Totals	2,070,191	100.00%	13	13	—
Voter turnout					

All information came from the Secretary of State of Georgia Website.

== District 1 ==
2006 Georgia's 1st congressional district election
- November 7, 2006

Nominee	Jack Kingston	Jim Nelson
Party	Republican	Democratic
Popular vote	94,961	43,668
Percentage	68.5%	31.5%
U.S. Representative before election
Jack Kingston
Republican
Elected U.S. Representative
Jack Kingston
Republican

=== Endorsements ===
Jim Nelson (D)

Individuals

- Wesley Clark, General, 2004 Democratic presidential candidate

==== Predictions ====
Source	Ranking	As of
The Cook Political Report	Safe R	November 6, 2006
Rothenberg	Safe R	November 6, 2006
Sabato's Crystal Ball	Safe R	November 6, 2006
Real Clear Politics	Safe R	November 7, 2006
CQ Politics	Safe R	November 7, 2006

=== General election results ===
Georgia's 1st congressional district election results, 2006
Party	Candidate	Votes	%	±%
Democratic	Jim Nelson	43,668	31.5%	
Republican	Jack Kingston (incumbent)	94,961	68.5%	
Republican hold		Swing		
Source: Georgia Secretary of State Archived June 14, 2007, at the Wayback Machine

== District 2 ==
2006 Georgia's 2nd congressional district election
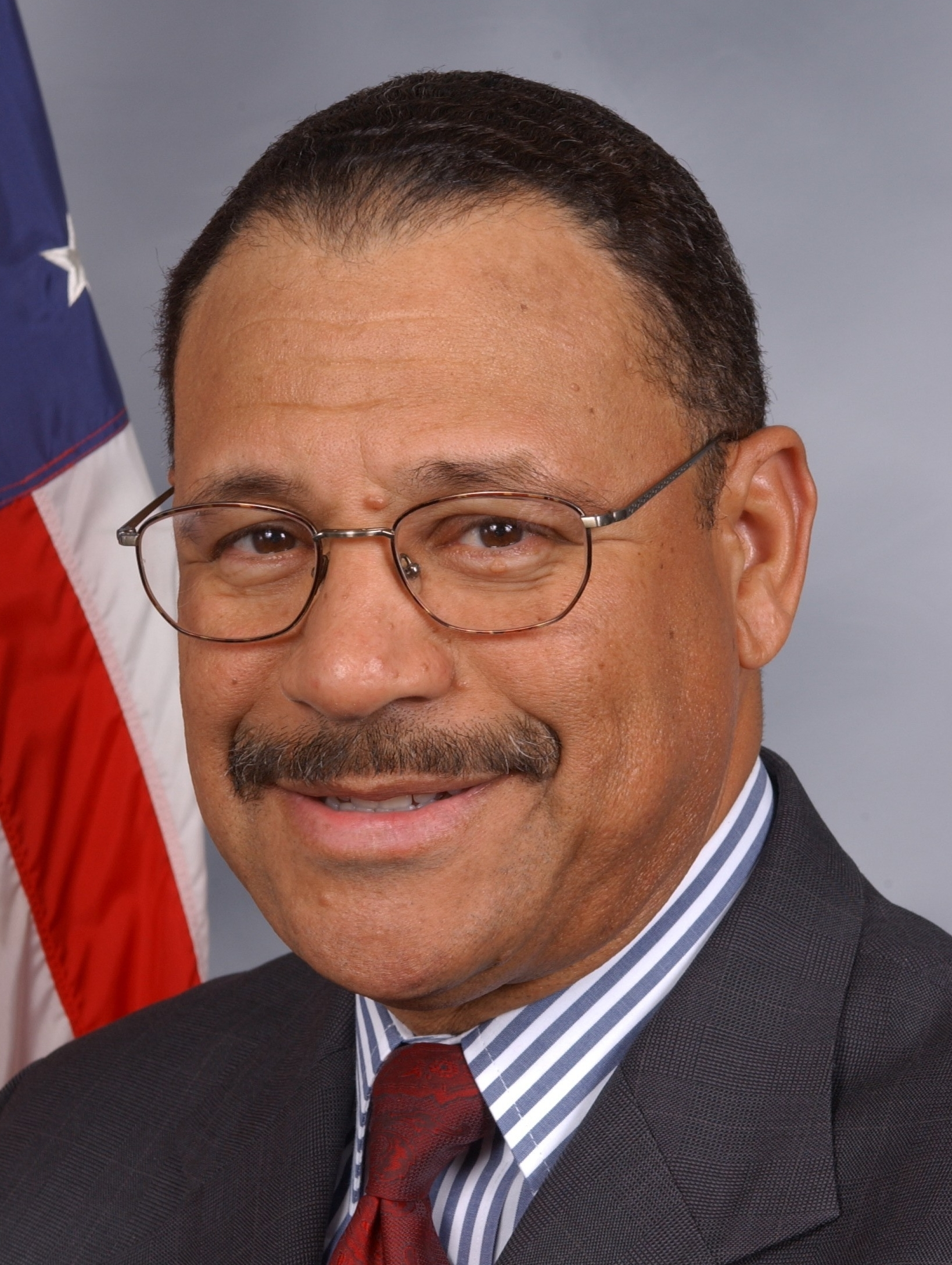

Nominee	Sanford Bishop	Bradley Hughes
Party	Democratic	Republican
Popular vote	88,662	41,967
Percentage	67.9%	32.1%
- County results Bishop 50–60% 60–70% 70–80% 80–90%
U.S. Representative before election
Sanford Bishop
Democratic
Elected U.S. Representative
Sanford Bishop
Democratic

=== Predictions ===
Source	Ranking	As of
The Cook Political Report	Safe D	November 6, 2006
Rothenberg	Safe D	November 6, 2006
Sabato's Crystal Ball	Safe D	November 6, 2006
Real Clear Politics	Safe D	November 7, 2006
CQ Politics	Safe D	November 7, 2006

=== General election results ===
Georgia's 2nd congressional district election results, 2006
Party	Candidate	Votes	%	±%
Democratic	Sanford Bishop (incumbent)	88,662	67.9%	
Republican	Bradley Hughes	41,967	32.1%	
Democratic hold		Swing		
Source: Georgia Secretary of State Archived June 14, 2007, at the Wayback Machine

== District 3 ==
2006 Georgia's 3rd congressional district election
- November 7, 2006
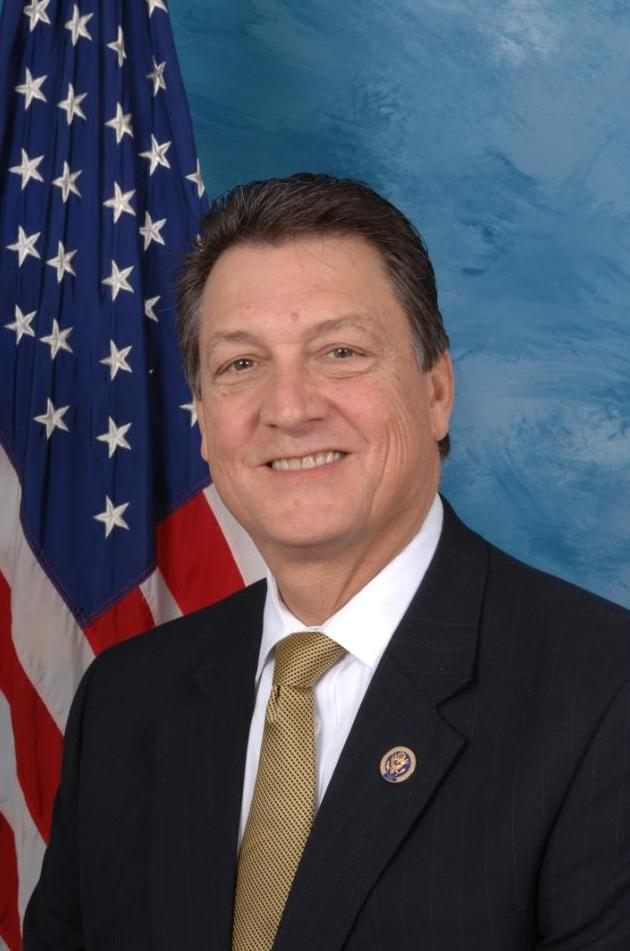

Nominee	Lynn Westmoreland	Mike McGraw
Party	Republican	Democratic
Popular vote	130,428	62,371
Percentage	67.6%	32.4%
U.S. Representative before election
Lynn Westmoreland
Republican
Elected U.S. Representative
Lynn Westmoreland
Republican

=== Predictions ===
Source	Ranking	As of
The Cook Political Report	Safe R	November 6, 2006
Rothenberg	Safe R	November 6, 2006
Sabato's Crystal Ball	Safe R	November 6, 2006
Real Clear Politics	Safe R	November 7, 2006
CQ Politics	Safe R	November 7, 2006

=== General election results ===
Georgia's 3rd congressional district election results, 2006
Party	Candidate	Votes	%	±%
Democratic	Mike McGraw	62,371	32.4%	
Republican	Lynn Westmoreland (incumbent)	130,428	67.6%	
Republican hold		Swing		
Source: Georgia Secretary of State Archived February 16, 2007, at the Wayback Machine

== District 4 ==
2006 Georgia's 4th congressional district election
- November 7, 2006

Nominee	Hank Johnson	Catherine Davis
Party	Democratic	Republican
Popular vote	106,352	34,778
Percentage	75.4%	24.6%
Elected U.S. Representative
Hank Johnson
Democratic

In the primary of July 18, incumbent Cynthia McKinney edged Johnson, a significant figure in DeKalb County politics, 47% to 45%. Johnson subsequently defeated McKinney 59% to 41% in the August 8 runoff election.

=== Predictions ===
Source	Ranking	As of
The Cook Political Report	Safe D	November 6, 2006
Rothenberg	Safe D	November 6, 2006
Sabato's Crystal Ball	Safe D	November 6, 2006
Real Clear Politics	Safe D	November 7, 2006
CQ Politics	Safe D	November 7, 2006

=== General election results ===
Georgia's 4th congressional district election results, 2006
Party	Candidate	Votes	%	±%
Democratic	Hank Johnson	106,352	75.4%	
Republican	Catherine Davis	34,778	24.6%	
Democratic hold		Swing		
Source: Georgia Secretary of State Archived 2007-06-14 at the Wayback Machine

== District 5 ==
2006 Georgia's 5th congressional district election
- November 7, 2006
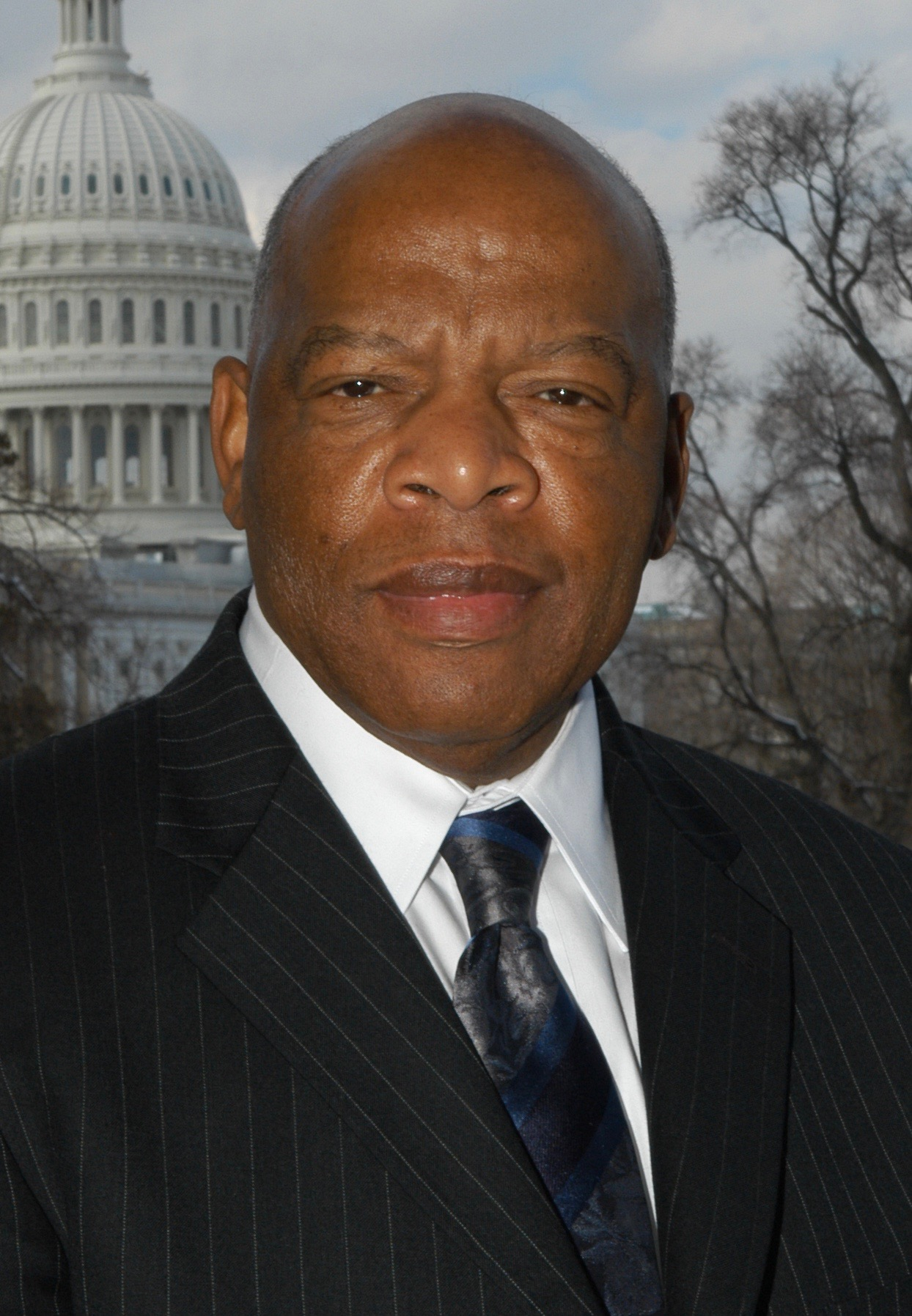
Nominee	John Lewis
Party	Democratic
Popular vote	122,380
Percentage	100.0%
U.S. Representative before election
John Lewis
Democratic
Elected U.S. Representative
John Lewis
Democratic

=== Predictions ===
Source	Ranking	As of
The Cook Political Report	Safe D	November 6, 2006
Rothenberg	Safe D	November 6, 2006
Sabato's Crystal Ball	Safe D	November 6, 2006
Real Clear Politics	Safe D	November 7, 2006
CQ Politics	Safe D	November 7, 2006

=== General election results ===
Georgia's 5th congressional district election results, 2006
Party	Candidate	Votes	%	±%
Democratic	John Lewis (incumbent)	122,380	100%	
Democratic hold		Swing		
Source: Georgia Secretary of State Archived February 16, 2007, at the Wayback Machine

== District 6 ==
2006 Georgia's 6th congressional district election
- November 7, 2006

Nominee	Tom Price	Steve Sinton
Party	Republican	Democratic
Popular vote	144,958	55,294
Percentage	72.4%	27.6%
U.S. Representative before election
Tom Price
Republican
Elected U.S. Representative
Tom Price
Republican

=== Predictions ===
Source	Ranking	As of
The Cook Political Report	Safe R	November 6, 2006
Rothenberg	Safe R	November 6, 2006
Sabato's Crystal Ball	Safe R	November 6, 2006
Real Clear Politics	Safe R	November 7, 2006
CQ Politics	Safe R	November 7, 2006

=== General election results ===
Georgia's 6th congressional district election results, 2006
Party	Candidate	Votes	%	±%
Democratic	Steve Sinton	55,294	27.6%	
Republican	Tom Price (incumbent)	144,958	72.4%	
Republican hold		Swing		
Source: Georgia Secretary of State Archived February 16, 2007, at the Wayback Machine

== District 7 ==
2006 Georgia's 7th congressional district election
- November 7, 2006
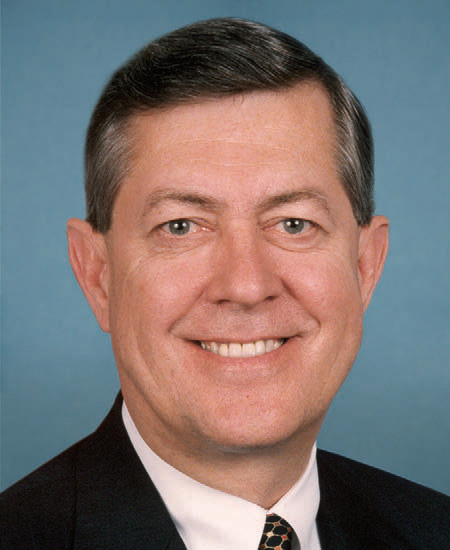

Nominee	John Linder	Allan Burns
Party	Republican	Democratic
Popular vote	130,561	53,553
Percentage	70.9%	29.1%
U.S. Representative before election
John Linder
Republican
Elected U.S. Representative
John Linder
Republican

=== Predictions ===
Source	Ranking	As of
The Cook Political Report	Safe R	November 6, 2006
Rothenberg	Safe R	November 6, 2006
Sabato's Crystal Ball	Safe R	November 6, 2006
Real Clear Politics	Safe R	November 7, 2006
CQ Politics	Safe R	November 7, 2006

=== General election results ===
Georgia's 7th congressional district election results, 2006
Party	Candidate	Votes	%	±%
Democratic	Allan Burns	53,553	29.1%	
Republican	John Linder (incumbent)	130,561	70.9%	
Republican hold		Swing		
Source: Georgia Secretary of State Archived 2007-02-16 at the Wayback Machine

== District 8 ==
A Republican mid-decade redistricting made this Macon-based district more compact and somewhat more Republican. Democratic incumbent Jim Marshall faced a very tough challenge by former Congressman Mac Collins, who represented an adjoining district from 1993 to 2005. Less than 60 percent of the population in Marshall's present 3rd District was retained in the new 8th District. The reconfigured 8th includes Butts County, the political base of his opponent, former Congressman Mac Collins, who once served as chairman of the county commission. On the other hand, the 8th also includes all of Macon, where Marshall served as mayor from 1995 to 1999. The race featured heavy spending, not only by the candidates themselves, but from independent groups. During the campaign, President George W. Bush attended a rally to try to help Collins. Marshall won reelection by some 1,700 votes.

Marshall was reelected with 63% in 2004, but in 2002 won by only 50.5% to 49.5%. This is one of the most competitive House races in the nation.

=== Predictions ===
Source	Ranking	As of
The Cook Political Report	Lean D	November 6, 2006
Rothenberg	Tilt D	November 6, 2006
Sabato's Crystal Ball	Lean D	November 6, 2006
Real Clear Politics	Tossup	November 7, 2006
CQ Politics	Lean D	November 7, 2006

=== General election results ===
2006 Georgia's 8th congressional district election
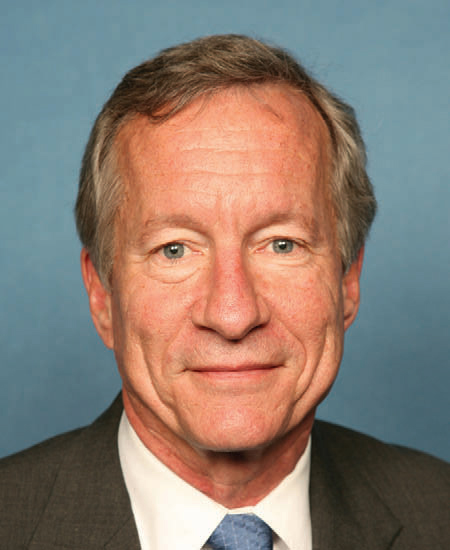

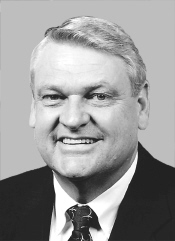
Nominee	Jim Marshall	Mac Collins
Party	Democratic	Republican
Popular vote	80,660	78,908
Percentage	50.5%	49.5%
- County results Marshall: 50–60% 60–70% Collins: 50–60% 60–70%
U.S. Representative before election
Jim Marshall
Democratic
Elected U.S. Representative
Jim Marshall
Democratic

Georgia's 8th congressional district election results, 2006
Party	Candidate	Votes	%	±%
Democratic	Jim Marshall (incumbent)	80,660	50.5%	
Republican	Mac Collins	78,908	49.5%	
Democratic hold		Swing		
Source: Georgia Secretary of State Archived February 16, 2007, at the Wayback Machine

== District 9 ==
2006 Georgia's 9th congressional district election
- November 7, 2006
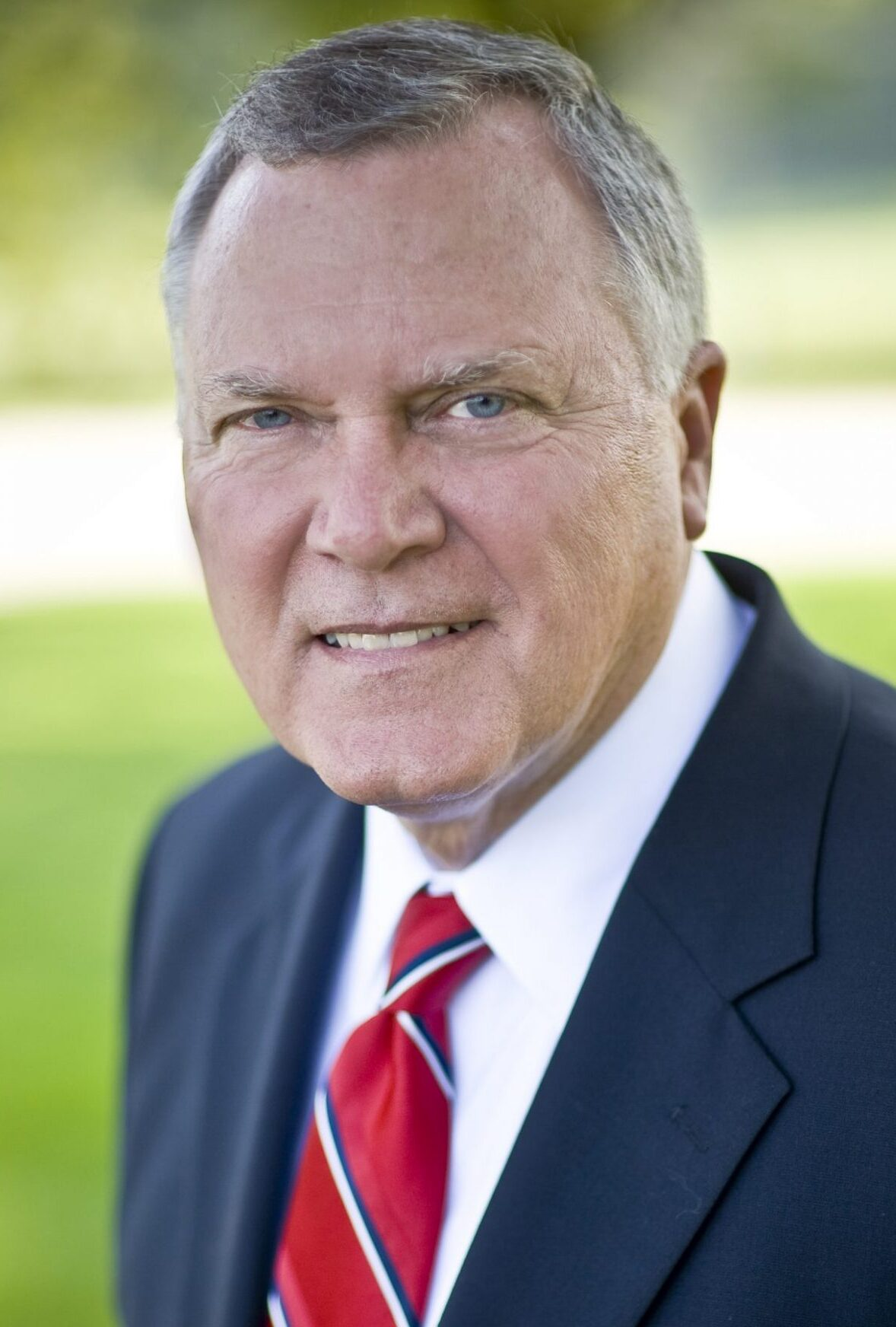

Nominee	Nathan Deal	John D. Bradbury
Party	Republican	Democratic
Popular vote	128,685	39,240
Percentage	76.6%	23.4%
U.S. Representative before election
Nathan Deal
Republican
Elected U.S. Representative
Nathan Deal
Republican

=== Predictions ===
Source	Ranking	As of
The Cook Political Report	Safe R	November 6, 2006
Rothenberg	Safe R	November 6, 2006
Sabato's Crystal Ball	Safe R	November 6, 2006
Real Clear Politics	Safe R	November 7, 2006
CQ Politics	Safe R	November 7, 2006

=== General election results ===
Georgia's 9th congressional district election results, 2006
Party	Candidate	Votes	%	±%
Democratic	John Bradbury	39,240	23.4%	
Republican	Nathan Deal (incumbent)	128,685	76.6%	
Republican hold		Swing		
Source: Georgia Secretary of State Archived February 16, 2007, at the Wayback Machine

== District 10 ==
2006 Georgia's 10th congressional district election
- November 7, 2006
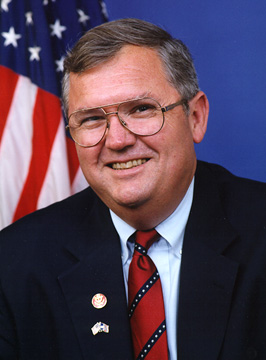

Nominee	Charlie Norwood	Terry Holley
Party	Republican	Democratic
Popular vote	117,721	57,032
Percentage	67.4%	32.6%
U.S. Representative before election
Charlie Norwood
Republican
Elected U.S. Representative
Charlie Norwood
Republican

=== Predictions ===
Source	Ranking	As of
The Cook Political Report	Safe R	November 6, 2006
Rothenberg	Safe R	November 6, 2006
Sabato's Crystal Ball	Safe R	November 6, 2006
Real Clear Politics	Safe R	November 7, 2006
CQ Politics	Safe R	November 7, 2006

=== General election results ===
Georgia's 10th congressional district election results, 2006
Party	Candidate	Votes	%	±%
Democratic	Terry Holley	57,032	32.6%	
Republican	Charlie Norwood (incumbent)	117,721	67.4%	
Republican hold		Swing		
Source: Georgia Secretary of State Archived June 14, 2007, at the Wayback Machine

== District 11 ==
2006 Georgia's 11th congressional district election
- November 7, 2006
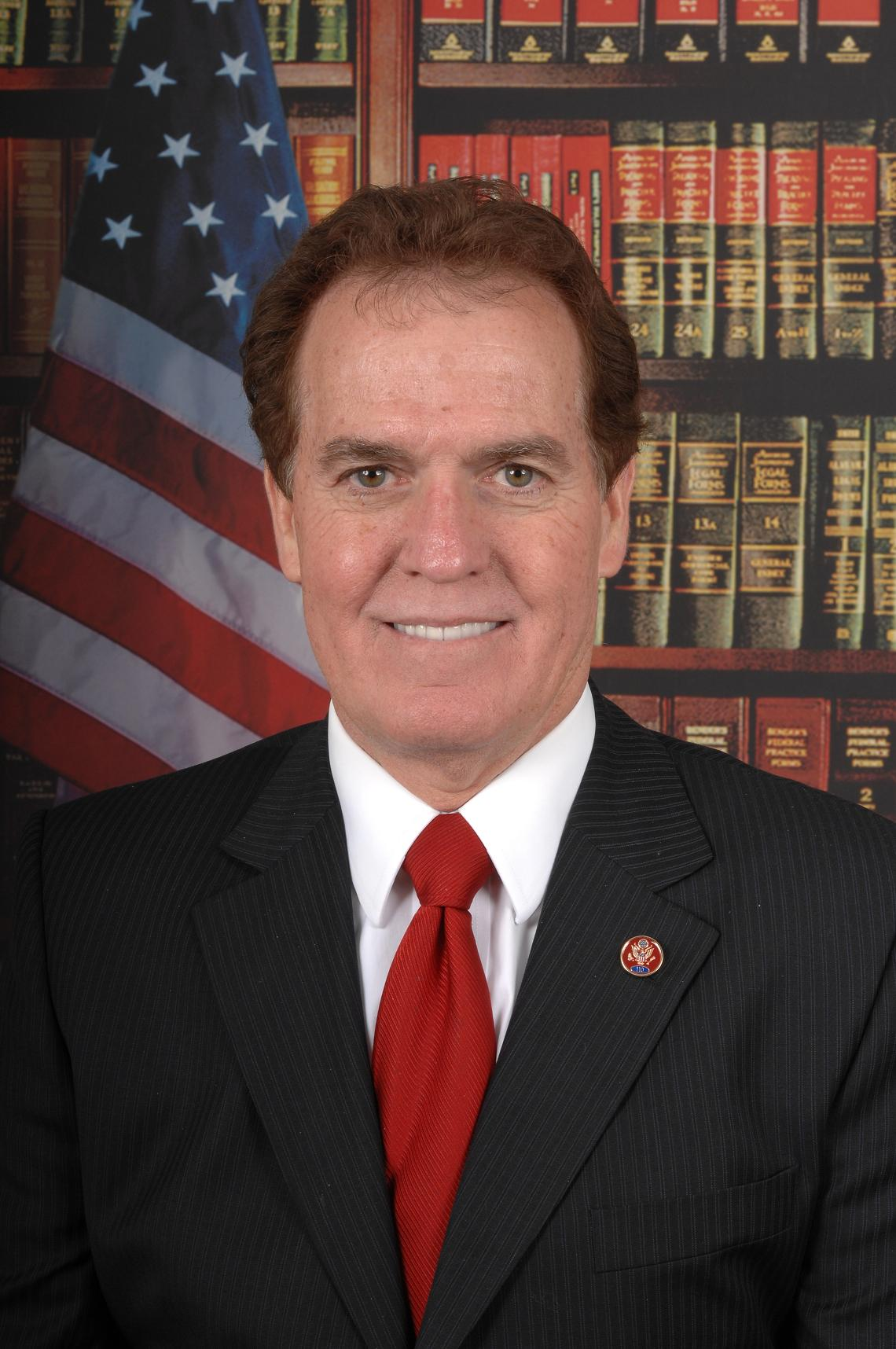

Nominee	Phil Gingrey	Patrick Samuel Pillion
Party	Republican	Democratic
Popular vote	118,524	48,261
Percentage	71.1%	28.9%
U.S. Representative before election
Phil Gingrey
Republican
Elected U.S. Representative
Phil Gingrey
Republican

=== Predictions ===
Source	Ranking	As of
The Cook Political Report	Safe R	November 6, 2006
Rothenberg	Safe R	November 6, 2006
Sabato's Crystal Ball	Safe R	November 6, 2006
Real Clear Politics	Safe R	November 7, 2006
CQ Politics	Safe R	November 7, 2006

=== General election results ===
Georgia's 11th congressional district election results, 2006
Party	Candidate	Votes	%	±%
Democratic	Patrick Pillion	48,261	28.9%	
Republican	Phil Gingrey (incumbent)	118,524	71.1%	
Republican hold		Swing		
Source: Georgia Secretary of State Archived June 14, 2007, at the Wayback Machine

== District 12 ==
Democrat John Barrow unseated first-term Republican Max Burns by 52% to 48% in a Democratic-leaning district which Burns won over a scandal-tainted opponent in 2002. This year, Burns sought a rematch. Recent redistricting made this southern Georgia district more mixed, but the balance still favored Democrats. Burns ran a tough campaign and made the race extremely close. In the end, however, Burns lost by 864 votes and ruled out a recount challenge to the certified results. This failure to win the seat by the GOP sealed the unprecedented gains of the Democrats, in which they did not lose a single House seat, Senate Seat or Governorship they held going into the election.

2006 Georgia's 12th congressional district election
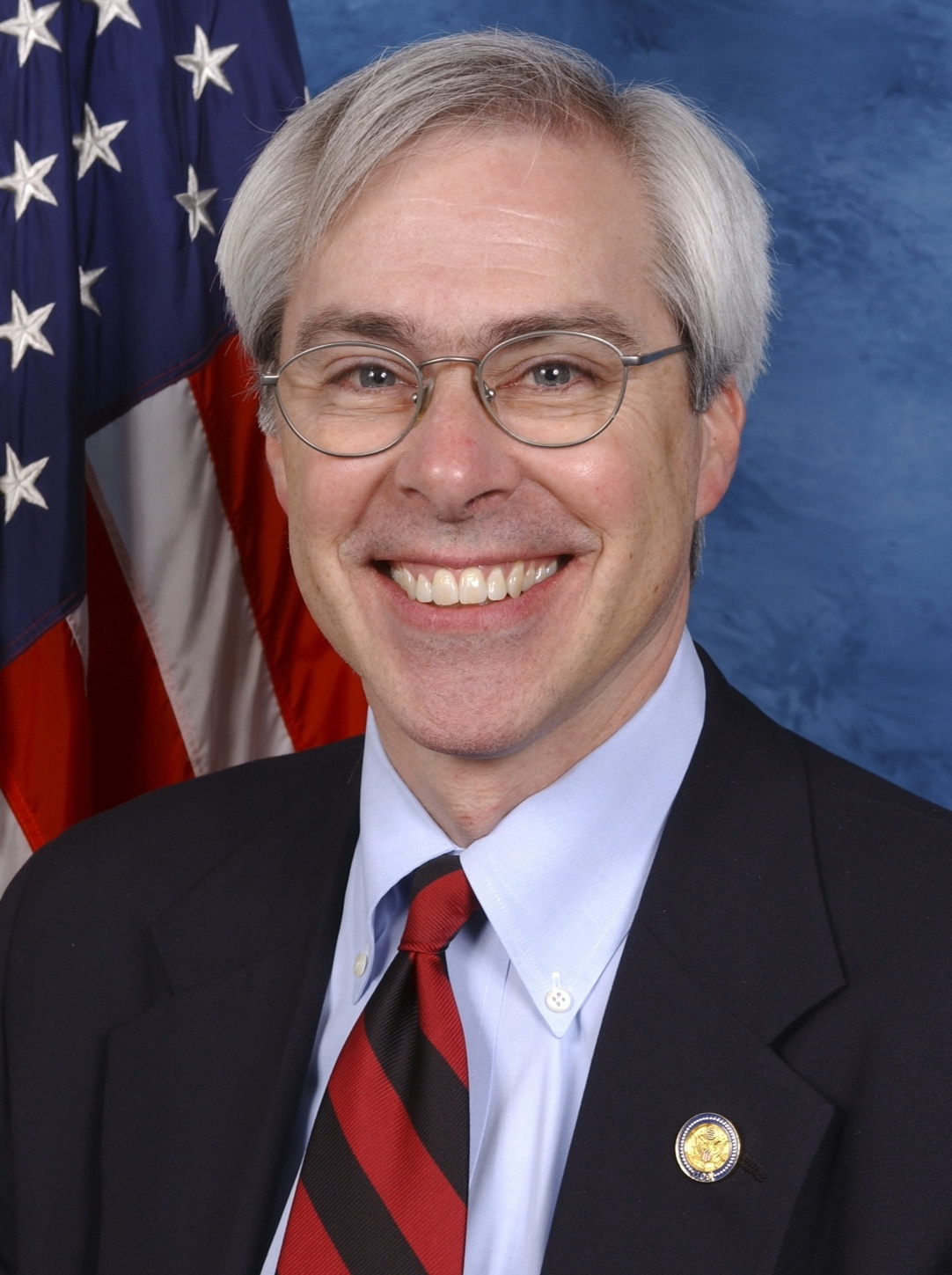

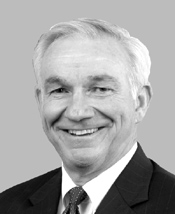
Nominee	John Barrow	Max Burns
Party	Democratic	Republican
Popular vote	71,651	70,787
Percentage	50.3%	49.7%
- County results Barrow: 50–60% 60–70% 70–80% Burns: 50–60% 60–70% 70–80%
U.S. Representative before election
John Barrow
Democratic
Elected U.S. Representative
John Barrow
Democratic

=== Predictions ===
Source	Ranking	As of
The Cook Political Report	Likely D	November 6, 2006
Rothenberg	Tilt D	November 6, 2006
Sabato's Crystal Ball	Tilt D	November 6, 2006
Real Clear Politics	Tossup	November 7, 2006
CQ Politics	Lean D	November 7, 2006

=== General election results ===
Georgia's 12th congressional district election results, 2006
Party	Candidate	Votes	%	±%
Democratic	John Barrow (incumbent)	71,651	50.3%	
Republican	Max Burns	70,787	49.7%	
Democratic hold		Swing		
Source: Georgia Secretary of State Archived June 14, 2007, at the Wayback Machine

== District 13 ==
2006 Georgia's 13th congressional district election
- November 7, 2006
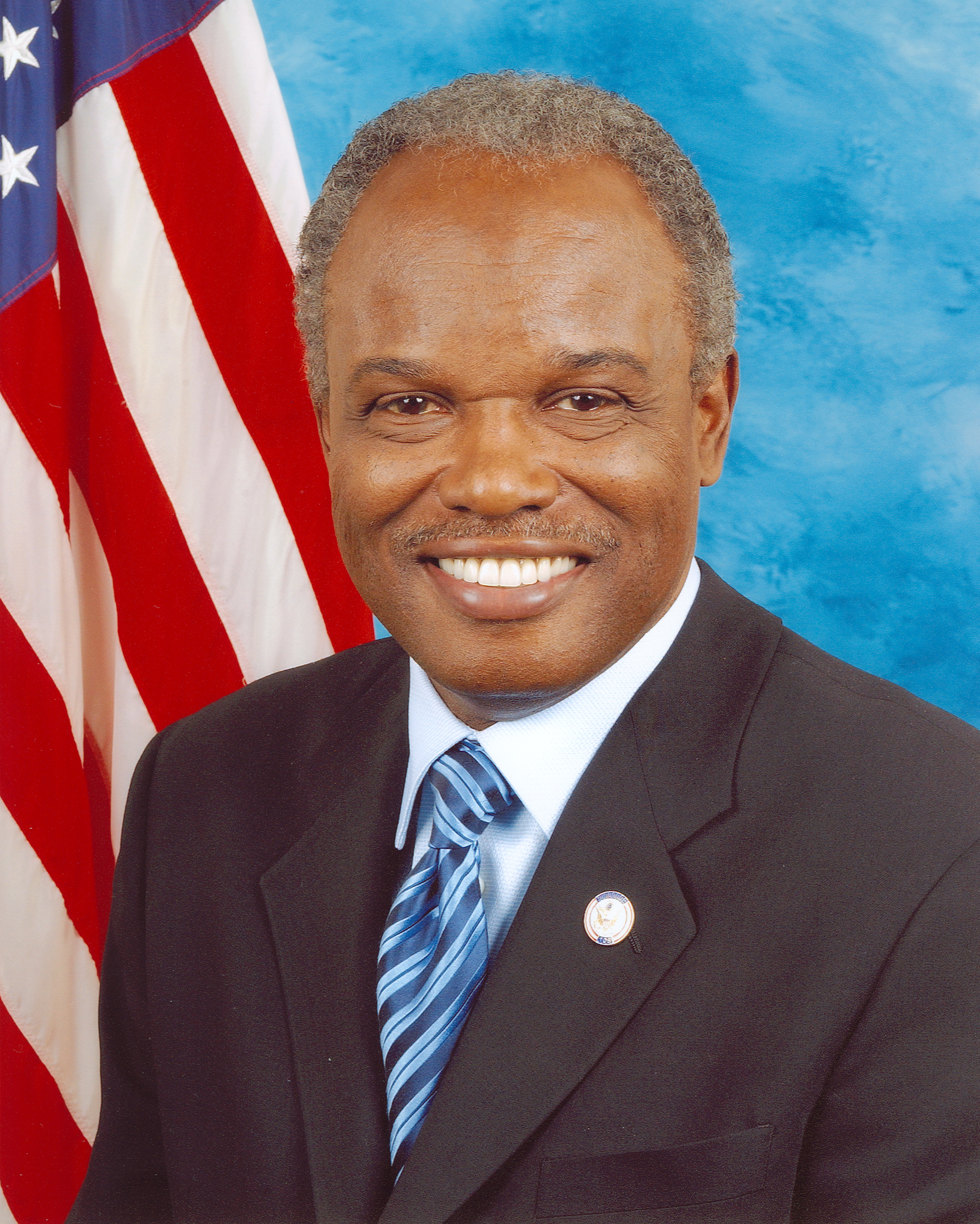

Nominee	David Scott	Deborah Travis Honeycutt
Party	Democratic	Republican
Popular vote	103,019	45,770
Percentage	69.2%	30.8%
U.S. Representative before election
David Scott
Democratic
Elected U.S. Representative
David Scott
Democratic

=== Predictions ===
Source	Ranking	As of
The Cook Political Report	Safe D	November 6, 2006
Rothenberg	Safe D	November 6, 2006
Sabato's Crystal Ball	Safe D	November 6, 2006
Real Clear Politics	Safe D	November 7, 2006
CQ Politics	Safe D	November 7, 2006

=== General election results ===
Georgia's 13th congressional district election results, 2006
Party	Candidate	Votes	%	±%
Democratic	David Scott (incumbent)	103,019	69.2%	
Republican	Deborah Honeycutt	45,770	30.8%	
Democratic hold		Swing		
Source: Georgia Secretary of State Archived June 14, 2007, at the Wayback Machine
