= Charlie Norwood =

American politician (1941–2007)

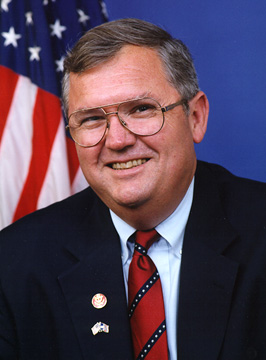

Member of the U.S. House of Representatives from Georgia
- In office January 3, 1995 – February 13, 2007
- Preceded by: Don Johnson
- Succeeded by: Paul Broun
- Constituency: 10th district (1995–2003); 9th district (2003–2007); 10th district (2007)

Personal details
- Born: Charles Whitlow Norwood Jr. July 27, 1941 Valdosta, Georgia, U.S.
- Died: February 13, 2007 (aged 65) Augusta, Georgia, U.S.
- Resting place: Westover Memorial Park; Augusta, Georgia, U.S.
- Party: Republican
- Spouse: Gloria Norwood
- Education: Baylor School; Georgia Southern University (BA); Georgetown University (DDS)
- Occupation: Dentist

Military service
- Branch/service: United States Army
- Years of service: 1967–1969
- Rank: Captain
- Battles/wars: Vietnam War

Charles Whitlow Norwood Jr. (July 27, 1941 – February 13, 2007) was an American politician who served as a Republican member of the United States House of Representatives from 1995 until his death in 2007. At the time of his death, Norwood was the representative of the 10th district of Georgia.

== Early life and education ==
Born in Valdosta, Georgia, Norwood graduated from Baylor School, then a military academy, in Chattanooga, Tennessee. He then attended Georgia Southern University in Statesboro, Georgia and Georgetown University in Washington, D.C. Before entering the House, Norwood operated a successful dentistry practice in Augusta.

He married his wife, Gloria, in 1962. They had two sons, Charles and Carlton, and lived in Evans, Georgia; a suburb of Augusta. Norwood was a Methodist.

== Military service ==
Norwood served as a captain in the United States Army from 1967 to 1969, beginning with an assignment to the U.S. Army Dental Corps at Sandia Army Base in Albuquerque, New Mexico. In 1968 he was transferred to the Medical Company (Company B-Med) of the 173rd Airborne Brigade in South Vietnam, and served a combat tour at Qui Nhon, An Khe and LZ English. During his tour, he participated in experimental military dental practices that are now standard procedure for the armed forces. Norwood was one of the first participants in the Army's outreach program that delivered dentists to forward firebases in lieu of transferring patients to rear treatment areas. He provided some of the first field-based dental treatment of military guard dogs, and assisted in non-dental trauma care in Mobile Army Surgical Hospitals.

In recognition of his service under combat conditions, Norwood was awarded the Combat Medical Badge and two Bronze Stars. After Vietnam, Norwood was assigned to the Dental Corps at Fort Gordon, Georgia, where he served until his discharge in 1969. He remained a member of the American Legion, the Veterans of Foreign Wars, and the Military Order of the World Wars until his death.

== Congressional campaigns ==
In late 1993, Norwood sold his dental practice to run for Congress in the 1994 elections as a Republican in the Augusta-based 10th District. In that election, he routed freshman Democratic incumbent Clete Donald Johnson Jr. by 31-point margin—one of the largest margins of defeat of the 1994 election cycle. He became the first Republican to represent his northeastern Georgia district since Reconstruction.

Norwood was nearly defeated in 1996, winning by only four points. He easily turned back spirited challenges in 1998 and 2000. However, in the 2000s round of redistricting, the Democratic-controlled state legislature crafted a congressional map designed to elect seven Democrats and six Republicans; at the time Georgia's congressional delegation consisted of eight Republicans and five Democrats. In the process, the legislature renumbered Norwood's district as the 9th District and shifted most of Augusta—which had been the heart of the district and its predecessors for over a century—to the newly created 12th District. To make up for the loss in population, Norwood's district picked up some more Republican territory in the North Georgia mountains. Norwood was reelected from this now heavily Republican district with 73 percent of the vote.

In 2004, Norwood received 74 percent of the vote against Democrat Bob Ellis. In 2006, his district was renumbered the 10th once again, and was pushed slightly to the west, absorbing Athens in the process. Athens was home to Democratic 12th District Congressman John Barrow, and Barrow was forced to move to Savannah rather than face certain defeat. Norwood was handily reelected, taking 68 percent of the vote against Democrat Terry Holley.

=== Potential bids for higher office ===
While Norwood was speculated as a potential candidate for Governor of Georgia in 2002 and United States Senate in 2004, he declined to run in either race, citing his health issues.

== Congressional career ==
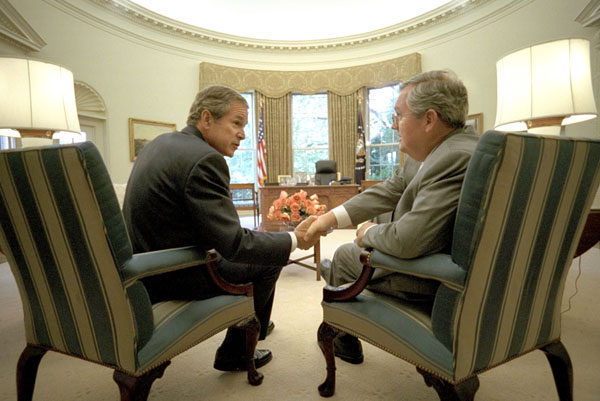
Norwood with President George W. Bush in 2001

Norwood was a staunch supporter of tight immigration control, and "called for putting nearly 40,000 troops on the U.S.-Mexico border. He co-wrote a provision to the recent Deficit Reduction Act that bars illegal aliens from getting Medicaid."

The Washington Post wrote the following in a summary of his career:

Rep. Norwood worked throughout much of his career to pass a patients' bill of rights, aimed at giving people better access to health care and greater ability to sue insurers. Over a decade, the bill passed through the House twice, but it failed after compromises needed to avoid a presidential veto caused Rep. Norwood to lose support in Congress. He reintroduced the bill before leaving Washington [in February 2007]. He criticized government intrusion into personal and business practices and was one of 33 House members who voted against renewing the Voting Rights Act [in 2006], arguing that it discriminates against Southern states over long-past racial transgressions.

Norwood regarded the preclearance provision of the Voting Rights Act of 1965, which requires certain jurisdictions to obtain federal approval before enacting changes to their election laws, as "blatant discrimination" against the targeted states. He opposed changing Georgia's state flag to one with less overt Confederate imagery.

== Illness and death ==
In 1998, Norwood was diagnosed with idiopathic pulmonary fibrosis, something he initially kept secret. In October 2004, he underwent a single lung transplant due to the condition. A year after the transplant, a cancerous tumor was found on Norwood's non-transplanted lung, and he underwent chemotherapy. By December 2006, the cancer had spread to his liver. The disease was believed to be caused by the immunosuppressants Norwood had to take due to the lung transplant. After the reconvening of Congress in January 2007, Norwood missed most of the sessions due to weakness from the chemotherapy. During the State of the Union address on January 23, 2007, President George W. Bush noted Congressman Norwood's absence from the Hall of the House and extended his thoughts for a speedy recovery.

On February 7, Norwood's office announced that he was forgoing further treatment for his cancer, and would be returning to Augusta in order to receive in-home hospice care.

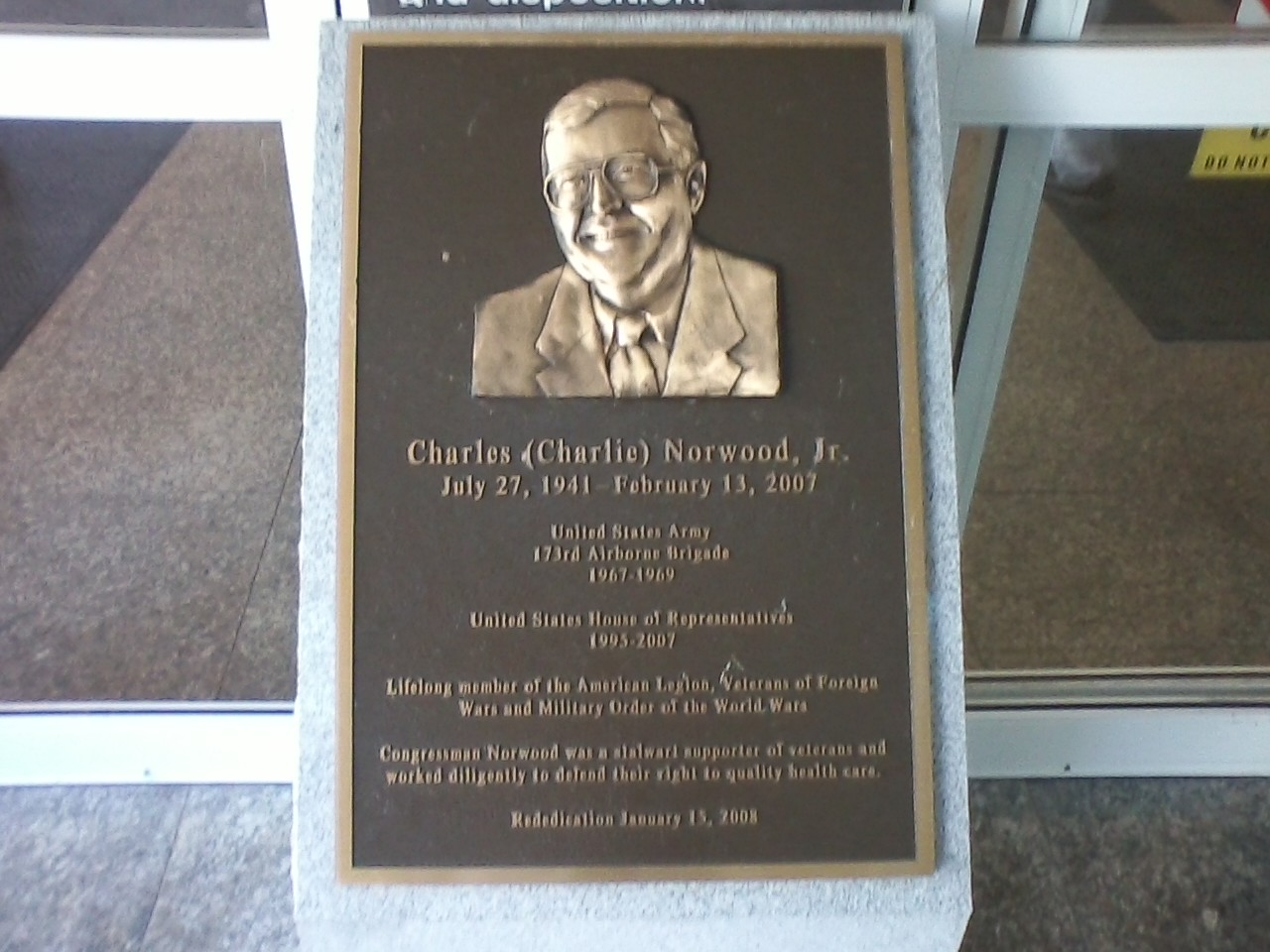
This plaque commemorates the re-dedication of the Charlie Norwood VA Medical Center and sits at the main entrance of the "uptown" facility.

Norwood died nearly one week later, on February 13. At approximately 2:02 PM Eastern time on the day of his death, a few moments of silence were observed for Norwood on the House floor. This moment of silence was repeated at 2:21 PM, at the behest of a delegation of Congressmen from Georgia. Norwood was survived by his wife, 2 children, and 4 grandchildren. President Bush said that he and his wife Laura were saddened by Norwood's death. "Charlie was a good friend and a strong, spirited legislator who always stuck to his principles, remembering that his duty was to represent the best interests of the citizens of his district," the President said in a written statement released by the White House.

In tribute to his life and service, The Veterans Affairs Medical Center in Augusta, GA was rededicated to bear his name. On January 15, 2008, the center officially became known as the Charlie Norwood VA Medical Center.

== Electoral history ==
Georgia's 10th congressional district: Results 1992–2000, 2006; Georgia's 9th congressional district: Results 2002–2004
Year	District	Democrat	Votes	Pct	Republican	Votes	Pct
1994	10th	Clete Donald Johnson Jr.	51,192	35%	Charlie Norwood	96,099	65%
1996	10th	David Bell	88,054	48%	Charlie Norwood	96,723	52%
1998	10th	Marion Denise Spencer Freeman	60,004	40%	Charlie Norwood	88,527	60%
2000	10th	Marion Denise Spencer Freeman	71,309	37%	Charlie Norwood	122,590	63%
2002	9th	Barry Irwin	45,974	27%	Charlie Norwood	123,313	73%
2004	9th	Bob Ellis	68,462	26%	Charlie Norwood	197,869	74%
2006	10th	Terry Holley	57,032	33%	Charlie Norwood	117,721	67%

== See also ==
- List of members of the United States Congress who died in office (2000–present)#2000s

U.S. House of Representatives
Preceded by Clete Donald Johnson Jr.	Member of the U.S. House of Representatives from Georgia's 10th congressional district January 3, 1995 – January 3, 2003	Succeeded by Nathan Deal
Preceded by Nathan Deal	Member of the U.S. House of Representatives from Georgia's 9th congressional district January 3, 2003 – January 3, 2007	Succeeded by Nathan Deal
Preceded by Nathan Deal	Member of the U.S. House of Representatives from Georgia's 10th congressional district January 3, 2007 – February 13, 2007	Succeeded by Paul Broun
