= Doug Barnard Jr. =

American congressman (1922–2018)

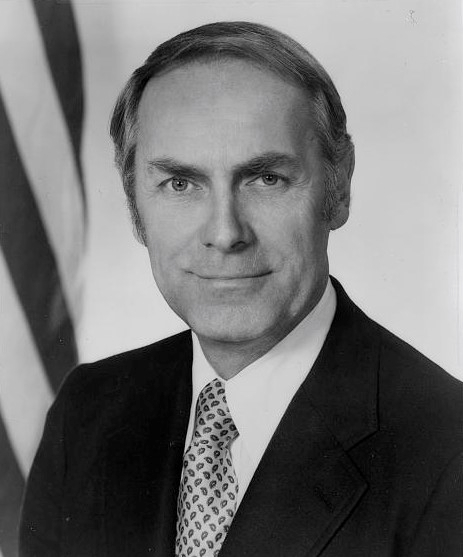

Member of the U.S. House of Representatives from Georgia's 10th district
- In office January 3, 1977 – January 3, 1993
- Preceded by: Robert G. Stephens Jr.
- Succeeded by: Don Johnson Jr.
House positions
Chair of the House Government Operations Subcommittee on Commerce, Consumer and Monetary Affairs
In office January 3, 1983 – January 3, 1993
Preceded by	Benjamin S. Rosenthal
Succeeded by	John M. Spratt

Board member of the Georgia Department of Transportation
- In office 1966–1976

Personal details
- Born: Druie Douglas Barnard Jr. March 20, 1922 Augusta, Georgia
- Died: January 11, 2018 (aged 95) Augusta, Georgia
- Party: Democratic
- Spouse: Naomi Holt "Nopi" Bernard
- Children: 3
- Education: Academy of Richmond County; Augusta College
- Alma mater: Mercer University (BA); Walter F. George School of Law (LLB)
- Profession: Attorney, banker

Military service
- Allegiance: United States
- Branch/service: United States Army
- Years of service: 1943 – 1945
- Unit: 57th Finance Disbursing Unit
- Battles/wars: World War II; European theatre of World War II

Druie Douglas Barnard Jr. (March 20, 1922 – January 11, 2018) was a United States congressman from the U.S. state of Georgia.

== Biography ==
Barnard attended the Richmond County public schools and graduated from the Academy of Richmond County (Augusta, Georgia) in 1939. He attended Augusta College from 1939 to 1940, then graduated in 1943 with a Bachelor of Arts from Mercer University in Macon, where he became a member of the Phi Delta Theta fraternity. He served in the United States Army during World War II from 1943 to 1945 and became a technician two. He served in the 57th Finance Disbursing Unit and was stationed at Fort Benjamin Harrison, Indianapolis, Indiana as well as in the European theatre of World War II in England, France and Belgium. After serving in the military, he returned to Georgia and earned a Bachelor of Laws from the Walter F. George School of Law at Mercer University in 1948.

From 1948 to 1962, Barnard engaged in the banking profession, primarily at the Georgia Railroad Bank, a former local Augusta banking institution. He was executive secretary to Georgia Governor Carl Sanders from 1963 to 1966, and a board member of the Georgia State Department of Transportation from 1966 to 1976. He was a Democrat.

Barnard was a delegate to the Georgia State Democratic convention in 1962 and a delegate to the 1964 Democratic National Convention. He served in the United States House of Representatives from 1977 to 1993. On March 22, 1980, he addressed a crowd estimated to be between 200 and 300 people where he unveiled the Georgia Guidestones monument in Elberton. He explained that the monument was to guide future generations and that it should make Americans try to ecologically preserve the environment.

Doug Barnard was an active member of First Baptist Church in Augusta. He was married to Naomi Holt "Nopi" Bernard, a poet. Barnard died on January 11, 2018, in Augusta, Georgia. He had two daughters, one son, and 7 grandchildren.

== Legacy ==
Georgia State Route 56 Spur, in Augusta, was named in his honor as the Doug Barnard Parkway.

== Electoral history ==
=== United States House of Representatives ===
United States House of Representatives elections, 1990
Party	Candidate	Votes	%	±%
Democratic	Doug Barnard Jr. (incumbent)	89,683	58.29	▼5.69
Republican	Sam Jones	64,184	41.71	
Total votes		153,867	100	
Democratic hold				

United States House of Representatives elections, 1988
Party	Candidate	Votes	%
Democratic	Doug Barnard Jr. (incumbent)	118,156	63.98
Republican	Mark Myers	66,521	36.02
Total votes		184,677	100
Democratic hold			

U.S. House of Representatives
Preceded by Robert Grier Stephens Jr.	Member of the U.S. House of Representatives from Georgia's 10th congressional district January 3, 1977 – January 3, 1993	Succeeded by Don Johnson Jr.
