= Don Johnson Jr. =

American politician (born 1948)

Don Johnson
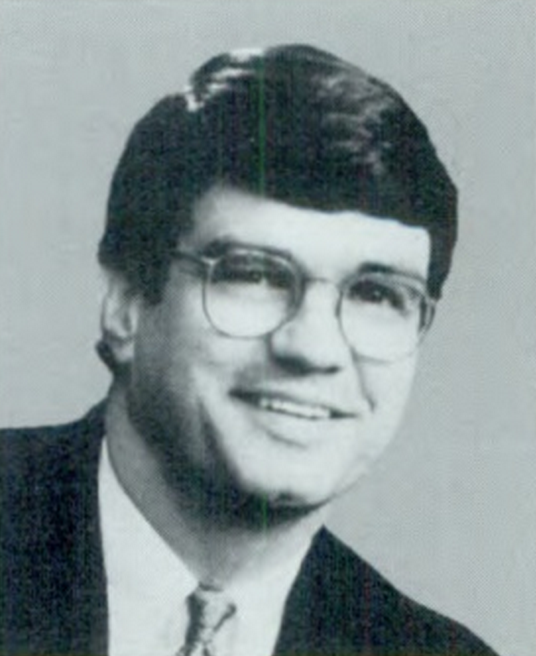

Member of the U.S. House of Representatives from Georgia's 10th district
- In office January 3, 1993 – January 3, 1995
- Preceded by: Doug Barnard Jr.
- Succeeded by: Charlie Norwood

Member of the Georgia State Senate from the 47th district
- In office 1987–1993
- Preceded by: Parks Brown
- Succeeded by: Eddie Madden

Personal details
- Born: Clete Donald Johnson Jr. January 30, 1948 (age 78) Atlanta, Georgia, U.S.
- Party: Democratic
- Spouse: Suzanne Spratlin
- Education: University of Georgia (BA, JD); London School of Economics (LLM)

Military service
- Branch/service: United States Air Force
- Years of service: 1973–1977
- Rank: Captain
- Unit: Air Force Judge Advocate General's Corps

Clete Donald Johnson Jr. (born January 30, 1948) is an American politician, diplomat, lawyer and academic from Georgia. From 1993 to 1995, he served one term in the U.S. House of Representatives.

== Early life and education ==
Johnson, born in Atlanta, was raised in Royston, Georgia where he has lived most of his life. He received his Bachelor of Arts degree from the University of Georgia in Athens in 1970. He earned his J.D. degree from the University of Georgia School of Law in 1973, where he served as articles editor for the Georgia Journal of International and Comparative Law. Upon graduation, he worked on the trade staff of the U.S. House Ways and Means Committee. He earned his Master of Laws degree from the London School of Economics in 1978. He also obtained a certificate in private and public international law from the Hague Academy of International Law in the Netherlands.

== Military service ==
Johnson served in the United States Air Force Judge Advocate General's Corps (JAG Corps) from 1973 to 1977. As a U.S. Air Force JAG Officer, Johnson was stationed for a year at Vandenberg Air Force Base in California, for two years at Incirlik Air Base in the Republic of Turkey, and for a final year at Lowry Air Force Base in Colorado. He was awarded the Air Force Commendation Medal as a military prosecutor and was honorably discharged with the rank of Captain.

== Georgia State Senate ==
After his military service, Johnson held a variety of positions. He practiced international banking law in the corporate counsel department of the Continental Illinois National Bank in Chicago and then as an associate at Powell, Goldstein, Frazer & Murphy LLP in Atlanta.

In 1982, he returned to Royston, Georgia to practice law with his father, former Solicitor General Clete D. Johnson. He was elected to the Georgia State Senate from the 47th District in 1987 to fill the unexpired term of the late Senator Parks Brown. The 47th District included Banks, Elbert, Franklin, Hart, Madison, and portions of Jackson counties. Johnson, a Democrat, served as chairman of the Appropriations Committee, vice-chairman of the Judiciary Committee, and served on the Committees on Agriculture, Transportation, Finance, Reapportionment, Public Utilities, and Rules. He served as Governor Joe Frank Harris’s assistant administration floor leader in the senate from 1989 until 1992. During his tenure as Georgia State Senator, Johnson was the original author of major legislation enacted to reform the state budget process, sovereign immunity, rural telecommunications, and the ethical standards of public officials.

== U.S. House of Representatives ==
Johnson won election in 1992 to the U.S. House of Representatives as a Democrat representing Georgia's 10th congressional district, succeeding 16-year incumbent Doug Barnard of Augusta. While in office, Johnson served on the House Armed Services Committee (HASC) and the House Committee on Science, Space and Technology and focused on national security and international economic policy. Johnson was also selected to serve as a member of Speaker Tom Foley's Working Group on Policy. He was a delegate to the North Atlantic Assembly (NATO's legislative advisory body) in Berlin and Copenhagen and monitored Russia's first parliamentary (Duma) election in Moscow in December 1993.

=== Defeat ===
Johnson was defeated in his bid for reelection in 1994, losing to Republican Charlie Norwood by a 31-point margin — the largest margin of defeat for a Democratic incumbent during the gigantic Republican landslide of that year. He was one of several moderate Southern Democrats who went down to defeat in that election. Johnson was tied to Bill Clinton largely because of his support for President Clinton's 1993 budget. Although extremely contentious at the time, this 1993 budget plan was credited as a contributing factor to the economic recovery from the recession of the early 1990s.

== U.S. Trade Representative ==
In 1998, President Bill Clinton appointed Johnson to the rank of ambassador at the Office of the United States Trade Representative and he served for two and a half years as chief textile negotiator and principal adviser to both the President of the United States and the United States Trade Representative on all textile and apparel trade matters. Among the significant negotiations concluded during Johnson's tenure in office were the U.S.-China World Trade Organization Accession Agreement and the U.S.-Cambodia Textile Agreement. The latter agreement, which Ambassador Johnson negotiated with the Cambodian Commerce Minister, is considered a landmark in that it included, for the first time, labor provisions linked to trade benefits. He also led the U.S. in WTO dispute cases involving textiles against the European Union and Pakistan and resolved other disputes through negotiations. Johnson was substantially involved with the development of trade legislation during this period, including the Trade Act of 2000 which incorporated the Caribbean Basin Initiative and African Growth and Opportunity Act.

== Career after politics ==
Johnson spent time as a partner at the law firm Patton Boggs LLP, and then was vice-chairman of Fleishman-Hillard Government Relations, Inc. In 2004, he moved to the Dean Rusk Center for International Law & Policy at the University of Georgia School of Law; he retired in 2015 and now is director emeritus.

On July 27, 2011, he contributed an op-ed article to The Atlanta Journal-Constitution, entitled "Show some courage on debt crisis - children are watching," in which he shares his personal story of how national interests should always outweigh narrow political interests.

=== Archives ===
Johnson's official papers are housed at the Richard B. Russell Library for Political Research and Studies at the University of Georgia.

== Personal life ==
Currently, Johnson resides on his family cattle farm outside of Royston, Georgia with his wife Suzanne Spratlin Johnson. Together, they have three children and two grandchildren.

U.S. House of Representatives
Preceded by Doug Barnard Jr.	Member of the U.S. House of Representatives from Georgia's 10th congressional district 1993–1995	Succeeded by Charlie Norwood
U.S. order of precedence (ceremonial)
Preceded by Michael Pappas as Former U.S. Representative	Order of precedence of the United States as Former U.S. Representative	Succeeded by Max Burns as Former U.S. Representative
