= Tom Taggart (Georgia politician) =

American politician

Member of the Georgia House of Representatives from the 125th district
- In office January 13, 1975 – January 8, 1979
- Preceded by: Ottis Sweat, Jr.
- Succeeded by: Bobby Phillips

Personal details
- Born: Thomas Robert Taggart; February 3, 1943 (age 83) Brooklyn, New York City, U.S.
- Party: Democratic
- Spouse: Helen
- Children: 1
- Education: Armstrong State College (BA); University of Georgia (JD)

Thomas Robert Taggart (born February 3, 1943) is an American politician. He served two terms in the Georgia House of Representatives. He won his first election to the State House in 1974. He lost his bid for renomination in 1978 by 11 votes to Bobby Phillips.

Taggart is an alumnus of Armstrong State College and University of Georgia School of Law. He married Helen McKenzie and has one daughter.
