= Thomas Taggart (rugby union) =

Rugby union player from Northern Ireland

- Born: 13 October 1866 Bushmills, County Antrim, Ireland
- Died: 18 February 1945 (aged 78) Portrush, County Antrim, Northern Ireland
- University: Trinity College Dublin
- Occupation: Solicitor

Rugby union career
- Position: Forward
International career
Years	Team	Apps	(Points)
1887	Ireland	1	(0)

Thomas Taggart (13 October 1866 — 18 February 1945) was an Irish international rugby union player.

Taggart was born in Bushmills, County Antrim, and educated Trinity College Dublin.

A forward, Taggart played with Dublin University and was capped once for Ireland, playing against Wales at Blackheath during the 1887 Home Nations Championship.

Taggart practised as a solicitor in Ballymoney.

== See also ==
- List of Ireland national rugby union players
